= List of cities, towns and villages in Gilan province =

A list of cities, towns and villages in Gilan Province of northern Iran:

== Alphabetical ==
Cities are in bold text; all others are villages.

=== A ===
Abatar | Abbas Gavabar | Abbas Kuh | Abbasabad | Abchalagi | Abdangsar | Abdu Chal | Abi Nam | Abkenar | Abrud | Abuyar | Afermejan-e Olya | Afermejan-e Sofla | Aftab Khvortab | Agari Bujaq | Aghasi | Aghuz Kalleh | Aghuz Keleh | Aghuzbon Kand Sar | Aghuzbon | Aghuzbon | Aghuzchal | Ahandan | Ahangar Mahalleh | Ahkalan | Ahmad Sara | Ahmadabad | Ahmadsargurab | Aineh Deh | Aj Bisheh | Aji Buzayeh | Akbar Sara | Akbarabad | Akbarabad | Akhund Mahalleh | Akhund Melk | Ala Sar | Alaki Sahra | Alalan-e Qadim | Alam Sar | Alan | Alankangeh | Ali Bozayeh | Ali Kalayeh | Ali Nowdeh | Ali Owsat Mahalleh | Ali Sara | Ali Sara | Ali Sara | Ali Sara | Ali Sorud | Ali Va | Aliabad Sara | Aliabad | Aliabad | Aliabad | Aliabad | Aliabad | Aliabad-e Kapur Chal | Alibeyk Sara | Alikhan Sara | Alkam | Allah Bakhsh Mahalleh | Allah Deh | Allah Rud | Allah Vajeh Sar | Allaheh Gurab | Allahka | Alman Lengeh | Alman | Alman | Alvian | Amildan | Aminabad | Aminabad | Amir Bekandeh | Amir Beyglu | Amir Gavabor | Amir Hendeh | Amir Hendeh | Amir Kalayeh | Amir Kia Sar | Amirabad | Amlash | Amshal | Anarestan | Anarkul | Anbar Sar | Anbara Pesht | Anbaran Mahalleh | Anbolan Sara | Anbu | Anbuh | Angulesh | Angulvar | Anjilan | Anjil-e Boneh | Anovi | Anush Mahalleh | Anush Mahalleh-ye Jow Kandan | Aq Masjed | Aq Masjed | Aq Owlar | Aqa Ali Sara | Aqa Mahalleh | Aqa Mahalleh-ye Bahambar | Aqa Nur-e Sehtan | Aqajan Mahalleh | Aqaseyyed Yaqub | Araban | Arb Gardan | Arba Sar | Arbastan | Arbeh Langeh | Arbu Kolayeh | Arbu Langeh | Arbu Sara | Ardajan | Ardeh | Areh Chak | Arus Mahalleh | Arushki | Asak | Asalem | Asb Buni | Asb Rish | Asbrahan | Asbu Sara | Asd Sara | Asgarabad | Ashik Aghasi | Ashiyan | Ashkal | Ashkar Meydan | Ashk-e Majan Pahlu | Ashtarkan | Ashurabad | Asia Barak | Asiab Darreh | Asiab Sar | Asiab Sar | Asiab Sham | Asiabar | Asiabarak | Asiab-e Saran | Askadeh | Askarabad | Astaneh-ye Ashrafiyeh | Astara | Asu | Atarud | Atash Sara | Ateshgah | Ava | Avaz Lar Sayyadlar | Ayarneh | Aynehvar | Ayzdin | Azar Key | Azarbon-e Olya | Azarbon-e Sofla | Azarcheh | Azarestan | Azarestanak | Azarsetanaki | Azbar | Azgam | Azhdeha Baluch | Aziz Kian

=== B ===
Baba Rekab | Baba Vali | Babajan Darreh | Babalu Mahalleh | Bagh Mahalleh-ye Narakeh | Baghbanan | Baghcheh Boneh | Baghcheh Sara | Baghdasht | Bagh-e Amir Bekandeh | Bagheshlu Mahalleh | Bahador Kalayeh | Bahador Mahalleh | Baham Bar | Baharestan | Baji Gavaber | Baji Sara | Bakhshi Hayati | Bal Tark | Bala Bijar Ankish | Bala Bolgur | Bala Deh | Bala Fidarreh | Bala Gava Sara | Bala Gazaf Rud | Bala Holu Sara | Bala Kala Gavabar | Bala Kuyakh | Bala Lam Beshkest | Bala Lamin Jub | Bala Mahalleh-ye Barka Deh | Bala Mahalleh-ye Chubar | Bala Mahalleh-ye Chukam | Bala Mahalleh-ye Gafsheh | Bala Mahalleh-ye Gildeh | Bala Mahalleh-ye Golrudbar | Bala Mahalleh-ye Lafmejan | Bala Mahalleh-ye Nalkiashar | Bala Mahalleh-ye Narakeh | Bala Mahalleh-ye Naser Kiadeh | Bala Mahalleh-ye Pashaki | Bala Mahalleh-ye Qasemabad | Bala Mahalleh-ye Siah Belash | Bala Now Deh | Bala Pap Kiadeh | Bala Rudposht | Bala Salkuyeh | Bala Shad Deh | Bala Shekar Kesh | Bala Tamushal | Balakdeh | Balalam | Balaskaleh | Balaskaleh-ye Emam Jomeh | Baldeh Sara | Balengah | Baleskeleh-ye Seyyed Abu ol Qasem | Balkut | Ban Monikesh | Banasar | Bandar Mahalleh | Bandar-e Anzali | Bandbon-e Bala | Bandbon-e Beneksar | Bandbon-e Pain | Bandbon-e Qasemabad | Bandbon-e Ujargah | Band-e Bon | Bangebar | Baqla Kesh | Bar Gali | Bar Poshteh Sar | Barakileh | Bararud | Bareh Posht | Bareh Sar | Bareh Sara | Barg Sara | Bargam | Bargam | Bariran | Barka Deh-e Pain | Barku Sara | Barmacheh-ye Bala Mahal | Barmacheh-ye Pain Mahal | Barzagaru | Barzuhandan | Bash Mahalleh-ye Lavandevil | Bashman | Bask | Baskam Chal | Baskeh Masham | Basteh Deym | Baz Kia Gurab | Baz Qaleh-ye Akbar | Baz Qaleh-ye Malek | Bazan | Bazar Deh | Bazar Deh-e Gol Bagh | Bazar Jomeh | Bazar Mahalleh | Bazargah | Bazargan Mahalleh | Bazarsar-e Lafmejan | Bazguiyeh | Bazneshin-e Olya | Bazneshin-e Sofla | Bazokol | Bedab | Behdan | Behesht Lat | Beheshtabad | Behpesa Bagh | Belesbeneh | Benek Sar | Benun | Ber Agur | Berm Kuh | Beyn Kalayeh | Biachal | Bialva | Bibalan | Bibi Yanlu | Bidrun | Bij | Bijar Anjil-e Kachal Bon | Bijar Bagh | Bijar Basteh Sar | Bijar Bin | Bijar Boneh | Bijar Boneh | Bijar Boneh-ye Bala | Bijar Boneh-ye Pain | Bijar Kenar | Bijar Khaleh | Bijar Pes | Bijar Posht | Bijar Poshteh | Bijar Sar | Bijar Sara | Bijarabin | Bijargah-e Olya | Bijargah-e Sofla | Bijarkan | Bijarkan | Bijirud Kol | Bilazh Mahalleh | Bili Langeh | Bilyabin | Birboneh-ye Bala | Birboneh-ye Pain | Birum | Bisheh Sara | Bishehgah | Bishehgah-e Bahambar | Bitam | Bivarzin | Bodagh Mahalleh | Bolagh Mahalleh | Bolur Dokan | Bonakdeh | Boneh Sara | Boneh-ye Zamin | Boruj Rah | Borun-e Bala | Borun-e Pain | Boz Kuyeh | Bozastan | Bozgah | Budian | Buin | Bujayeh | Bura Sara | Butestan | Buyeh

=== C ===
Chaboksar | Chaf and Chamkhaleh | Chafal | Chaf-e Bala | Chaf-e Pain | Chafjir | Chafu Chah | Chahar Deh | Chahar Khaneh Sar-e Bala | Chahar Khaneh Sar-e Pain | Chaharsu Poshteh | Chak Rud | Chak | Chakal | Chakanak | Chakh | Chakrud | Chaku Sar | Chakuvar | Chal Dasht | Chalak Sar | Chalak Sara | Chalak Saraki | Chalak | Chalaras | Chaleh Bijar | Chaleh Sara | Chalekash-e Lat | Chaleshom | Chalga Sar | Chalikdan | Chaliki | Chalkesh | Challeh Khuni | Chalman Rud | Chaman | Chamandan | Chamchal | Chamkhaleh | Chamlar | Chamtu | Chamtu Kesh | Chamush Duzan | Chanajeh | Changarian | Changul | Chapak-e Nazemi Mahalleh | Chapak-e Shafi Mahalleh | Chapar Khaneh | Chapar Pord | Chapar Pord-e Zaman | Chapeh Zad | Charan | Charman | Charuq Duz Mahalleh | Charvadeh | Chavar Kalayeh | Chavar Kalayeh | Chay Bijar | Chay Khaleh | Chayjan | Chaykhansar | Chehel Gacheh | Chehesh | Chekcheh Posht | Chekhreh Mahalleh | Chelak | Cheleh Bar | Chelevand | Chelevand-e Pain | Chelownah Sar | Chelvan Sara | Chenar Bon | Chenar Rudkhan | Cheneh Sar | Cheshna Sar | Chesli | Chichal | Chichi Nikuti | Chini Jan | Chiran | Chit Bon | Chomacha | Chomachar | Chomaqestan | Chomaqestan | Chomesqal | Chopul | Chopul Kesh | Chorreh | Choshan | Chovazhiyeh | Chowsar | Chub Tarashan | Chubar | Chubar | Chubeh | Chubtarash Mahalleh | Chufolki | Chukadeh | Chulab | Chuladeh | Chunchenan | Chupan Mahalleh | Chur Kuchan | Churi | Churk Muzan | Chushadestan | Chushal

=== D ===
Dada Mahalleh | Dadqansara | Daf Sar | Dafchah | Dafraz | Dahandeh | Dahaneh Sar-e Shijan | Dahaneh Siah Darun | Dahaneh-ye Sar-e Sefidrud-e Kohneh | Dakhel | Dakleh Sara | Dalecheh | Dalivandan | Damash | Damir Ughlikesh | Damuchal | Dangayeh | Dar Sara | Dar Tamush | Darbagh | Darband | Darband, Rudbar | Dargah | Dargah | Darkhaneh | Darreh Dasht | Darreh Jir | Darreh Mahalleh | Darreh Posht | Darsanak | Darugar Mahalleh | Darvar Mahalleh | Darvaz | Darvish Khani | Darvishan Bar | Darya Bon | Darya Kenar | Daryasar | Darzi Gavabar | Darzi Mahalleh | Dasht Daman | Dasht Mian | Dasht Raz | Dashtagan | Dashtak | Dashtansar | Dasht-e Olam | Dasht-e Veyl | Dastak | Datvarsar | Davan | Davay-e Lat | Davi Sara | Dazdak | Dazrud | Degerman Keshi | Deh Baneh | Deh Baneh-ye Eslamabad | Deh Boneh | Deh Jan | Deh Sar | Deh Sar | Deh-e Mord Sara | Dehgah | Dehgah | Dehkadeh Qods | Dehsar | Dehsar | Dehshal | Delah Khani | Delijan | Delijan | Delijan | Deran | Derapeshtan | Deraz Geri | Deraz Lat-e Bala | Deraz Mahalleh | Derazlu | Deylaman | Dezli | Diansar | Diar Jan | Digeh Sara | Dilaj Mahalleh | Dileh | Dilma Deh | Dima Sara | Dimabon | Dimajankesh | Dinachal | Dirakari | Div Darreh | Div Rud | Div Rud | Divrash | Divshal | Divshal Poshteh | Diz Kuh | Dizbon | Dizgah | Dizgah Mahalleh | Do Ab Mardakh | Do Ab | Do Gol Sar | Do Khaleh Kuh | Dogasar | Doldim-e Bozorg | Donbal Deh | Dorafsheh | Dorudkhan | Doshman Kordeh | Dowgal | Dowgur | Dowsaledeh | Dozdaksu | Duadadeh | Dubaj | Dubaj | Dubakhshar | Dugol-e Sara | Dul Beyn | Dula Gavabar | Dulah Sar | Duleh Malal | Dulkuh | Dusatlat | Dustkuh

=== E ===
Ebrahim Sara | Emam | Emamzadeh Ebrahim | Emamzadeh Hashem | Emamzadeh Shafi | Emamzadeh Taqi | Eram Sadat | Erbeh Bon | Esfand | Esfandiyarsara | Esfaqansar | Eshkalan | Eshkelet | Eshkik | Eshkiyet | Eshkorab | Eshman-e Dehgah | Eshman-e Kamachal | Eshmenan Talem | Eshpala | Eshpalam | Eskabon | Eskolak | Eslamabad | Esmail Gavabar | Esmail Sara | Esmailabad | Espahabdan | Espeyli | Espid Darbon | Estakhr Sar | Estakhr-e Bijar | Estakhrgah | Estalak | Estalakh Jan | Estalakh Kian | Estalkh Kuh | Estalkh Zir | Estehsar | Eyn-e Sheykh | Eyvan Estakhr | Ezbaram | Ezzatabad | Ezzatabad-e Sharm Dasht

=== F ===
Fabil Sara | Fabili | Fakhab | Fakhrabad | Faksh | Falak Deh | Fallahabad | Fandoq Poshteh | Fashalam | Fashkham | Fashkol Poshteh | Fashtakeh | Fashtal | Fashu Poshteh | Fatatu | Fathkuh | Fatideh | Fatmeh Sar | Febil Gav Sara | Feblasheh | Fekejur | Feshkecheh | Feshtam | Feyzabad | Fi Ab | Fildeh | Fishom | Forshki-ye Chukam | Forshom | Foshtom | Fuman | Fushazdeh | Fusheh

=== G ===
Gachara-ye Chahardeh | Galankash | Galesh Gacheh | Galesh Kalam-e Leyla Kuh | Galesh Khaleh | Galesh Kheyl | Galesh Khil | Galesh Kolam | Galesh Mahalleh | Galesh-e Musha | Galivarz | Galu Kuh | Gand Lavar | Ganj Ali Sara | Ganjar | Ganjarud | Ganjeh | Garaku | Garamkhani | Garfam | Garkarud | Garm Sar | Garmab Dasht | Garmabrud | Garmavar | Garmay Sar | Garmay Sara | Garmejan | Garsak-e Pain | Garusi | Garzaneh Chak | Gasgareh | Gasht | Gasht-e Gurab | Gasht-e Rudkhan | Gaskaminjan | Gav Koli | Gav Kuh | Gav Mast | Gava Sara-ye Olya | Gavarj | Gaviyeh | Gavkul | Gavmishban | Gazgisheh | Gel-e Sefid | Gerakeh | Geraku | Geran | Gerd Gavabar | Gerd Geraf | Gerd Poshteh | Gerd Visheh | Gerda Ulast | Gerd-e Kuh | Gerdelat | Gerdkuh | Gereh Govabar | Geruf | Getge Sara | Geyshom | Gharib Mahalleh | Gholamreza Bagh | Giaku | Giga Sar | Gijow | Gil Chalan | Gil Pordeh Sar | Gila Deh | Gilak Mahalleh-ye Alalan | Gilakajan | Gilakash | Gilamolk | Gilandeh | Gilandeh | Gilavandan | Gilayeh | Gilbam | Gildeh | Gil-e Musha | Gileh Sara | Gilova Mahalleh | Gilva Dashtan | Giri | Gisel | Gisum | Gol Afzan | Gol Bazu | Gol Mahalleh | Gol Mahalleh | Gol Sarak | Gol | Golab Mahalleh | Golabkhvaran | Golestan Sara | Golestan Sara, Amlash | Golestan | Golkesh | Golshan | Golsu | Gomol | Gomol Sara | Gorbeh Kucheh | Goshkur | Gowhardan | Gudi Gavabar | Gudi Owlar | Gudun Gavabar | Gugah | Gugah | Gukeh | Gulak | Gunesh | Gupol | Gur Abjir | Gurab Javar | Gurab Pas | Gurab Sar | Gurab Varzal | Gurab Zarmikh | Gurab | Gurab | Gurab-e Lishavandan | Gurandan | Gusfand Guyeh | Gushkejan | Gushlavandan | Gusht-e Pazan | Guvard | Guzalbon | Guzeh Lengeh

=== H ===
Hadi Gavaber | Hadi Kiashar | Haft Band | Hajj Amir-e Vanehbin | Hajj Bahram Mahalleh | Hajj Ebrahim Deh | Hajj Salim Mahalleh | Hajj Shahbaz Mahalleh | Hajj Yadollah Mahalleh | Hajji Bekandeh | Hajji Bijar va Jas Ganas | Hajji Deh | Hajji Sara | Hajji Shirkia | Hajjiabad | Hajjiabad | Hajjiabad | Hajjiyeh Mahalleh | Halestan | Halimeh Jan | Hallaj Mahalleh | Halqeh Basteh | Halqeh Sara | Halu Bon Darreh | Halu Chak | Halu Kaleh | Halukhani | Har Do Ab | Harat Bar | Harat Bar | Hareh Dasht | Hareh Shun Dasht | Harkian | Harzel Kuh | Hasan Ali Deh | Hasan Bekandeh | Hasan Dayerman | Hasan Rud | Hasan Sara | Hasanabad | Hasanabad | Hashkova | Hashtaruchuni | Hashtpar | Hasni Kuh | Haviq | Hayan | Haymar | Helis | Hellah Dommah | Hend Khaleh | Hendavaneh-ye Pordesar | Hendeh Garan | Henzeni | Henzeni-ye Bala | Herandan | Heshmatabad | Heydar Alat | Heyran-e Olya | Heyran-e Sofla | Heyran-e Vosta | Hileh Sara | Homasar | Hoseyn Kuh | Hoseyn Sara | Hoseynabad | Hoseynabad | Hoseynabad | Hoseynabad | Hoseynabad-e Chaf | Hudi | Hudul | Hulestun | Hurian |

=== I ===
Ilkufi | Imanabad | Ini | Ir Mahalleh | Ishgah | Ishgah | Ishku-ye Bala | Ishku-ye Pain | Ishliki

=== J ===
Jadeh Kenar | Jafarabad | Jalal Deh | Jaliseh | Jamakuh | Jamalabad-e Hallaj | Jamalabad-e Kuseh | Jamalabad-e Nezamivand | Jan Aliabad | Jan Sherud | Janakbar | Janbaz Mahalleh | Janbeh Sara | Jangemireh | Jaran | Javaher Dasht | Javardeh | Jazem Kol | Jebrail Mahalleh | Jefrud-e Bala | Jefrud-e Pain | Jelidan | Jeseydan | Jir Bagh | Jir Deh | Jir Gavabar | Jir Gavaber | Jir Kal | Jir Mahalleh-ye Kasma | Jir Sara | Jirandeh | Jirdeh | Jirdeh | Jirdeh-e Pasikhan | Jirgurab | Jirhandeh | Jirkuyeh | Jirsar-e Bahambar | Jirsar-e Baqer Khaleh | Jirsar-e Chukam | Jirsar-e Nowdeh | Jirsar-e Vishka | Jodanukar | Johud Bijar | Jong Sara | Jow Kandan-e Bozorg | Jow Poshtan | Jowlandan | Jowpish | Jowr Gavaber | Jowr Mahalleh | Jowr Sara | Jowrka Sar | Ju Posht | Ju Posht | Jubaneh | Juben | Jukul Bandan | Jur Deh | Jur Deh | Jurbijarkol | Jurkuyeh | Juryab

=== K ===
Kabud Mehr | Kabutar Abkesh | Kacha | Kachal Bon | Kachalak | Kacha-ye Chahardeh | Kachelam | Kachum Mahalleh | Kadu Sara | Kafsh Kal Mahalleh | Kafteh Rud | Kaghazi | Kahbijar | Kahlebun | Kahlestan | Kajan | Kaj-e Mohammad Gavabor | Kajil | Kakerud | Kakrud | Kal Chal | Kal Sar | Kalab | Kalach Khandan | Kalachah | Kalah Sara | Kalak | Kalam Rud | Kalamar | Kalan Kalayeh | Kalan Sara | Kalarm | Kalashem-e Bala | Kalashem-e Pain | Kalashtar | Kalayeh Pahlu | Kalayeh | Kalayeh | Kaldarreh-ye Olya | Kaldarreh-ye Sofla | Kaldeh | Kaldeh | Kaliman | Kalisham | Kaljar | Kalkamus | Kalleh Dasht | Kalmarz | Kalnadan-e Bala | Kalnadan-e Pain | Kalrud | Kalueh | Kaluraz | Kama Kol | Kama | Kamachal-e Bala Mahalleh | Kamachal-e Pain Mahalleh | Kamal ol Din Poshteh | Kamamradkh | Kamsar | Kanaf Gurab | Kand Sar | Kandalat | Kand-e Bon | Kandeh Sara | Kandsar | Kandsar | Kandsar-e Bibalan | Kandsar-e Shekar Kesh | Kandsar-e Zeyn Pareh | Kanrud | Kanzer | Kapurchal | Kara Rud-e Jamshidabad | Karaf Chal | Karaf Kol | Karaf Mahalleh | Karafestan | Karafestan | Karamak-e Bala | Karbalayi Mehdi Gardeh | Karband | Karbas Saray-e Olya | Karbas Saray-e Sofla | Karbasdeh | Kareh Rud | Kareh Rud Khan | Kargan | Karim Sara | Karkhaneh-ye Raisiyan | Karmun | Karsang-e Shahi Jan | Karsidan | Kas Ahmadan | Kasan | Kasemjan | Kash Kalayeh | Kashal | Kashal-e Azad Mahalleh | Kashal-e Azad Sara | Kashbil | Kashfi | Kashki | Kashkjan | Kashkuh | Kashtami | Kasma | Kateh Khurteh-ye Pain | Kateh Sar | Kateh-ye Shast Abadan | Kateh-ye Shast-e Abadan-e Chahardeh | Katemjan-e Motamedi | Katemjan-e Seyyed Abd ol Vahhabi | Katemjan-e Yusefali | Kateshal-e Bala | Kateshal-e Pain | Katigar | Katik Lahijan | Kaveh Langeh | Kazemabad | Kazh Deh | Kelachay | Kelfat | Kelid Bar | Kelid Sar | Kelidbar | Kenar Sar | Kenar Sar-e Arbabi | Kerdeh Sara | Kesar | Kesar | Keshavar | Keshavarz-e Khotbeh Sara | Keshayeh | Keshel Varzal | Keshli | Keshmesh | Kevishad | Keyvan Poshteh | Khachekin | Khajan-e Chahar Dang | Khajan-e Do Dang | Khajkeh | Khak Shur | Khakian | Khal Kiasar | Khalaj Mahalleh | Khalajlar | Khalaki | Khalavarjan | Khaleh Sar | Khaleh Saray-e Panjah va Haft | Khaleh Saray-e Panjah va Noh | Khalesan | Khalia Gol | Khalian | Khalifeh Gari | Khalifeh Gavabar | Khalifeh Kenar | Khalifeh Mahalleh | Khalil Mahalleh | Khalil Sara | Khalilan | Khalileh Sara | Khalileh Sara | Khalkhalian | Khalkhalian | Khalsha | Khalu Bagh | Khan Hayati | Khan Kasaray-e Olya | Khana Chah | Khana Poshtan | Khana Poshtan | Khanaf Cheh | Khanavar Sara | Khaneh Kenar | Khaneh Sar | Khaneh Sarek | Khaneh Vaneh | Khanehhay-e Asiab | Khaneqah Bala va Pain | Khaneqah Bar | Khanollah | Khara Rud | Kharaf Kam | Kharajgil | Kharashk | Kharashtom | Khareh Kesh | Kharehpu | Kharf Kureh | Kharfakol | Kharrat Mahalleh | Kharrat Mahalleh | Khasadan-e Olya | Khasadan-e Sofla | Khaseh Kul | Khaseh Sara | Khataiyeh | Khatib Gurab | Khatiban | Khatiban | Khayyat Mahalleh | Kherf | Khesht Masjed | Khesht Masjed | Khesmakh | Kheyl Gavan | Kheymeh Sar | Khoda Shahr | Khojeh Darreh | Kholsha-e Chahardeh | Khomam | Khomeyr Mahalleh | Khomeyr Mahalleh | Khomeyr Mahalleh | Khomeyr Mahalleh | Khomeyran | Khomiran | Khompateh Arbu Sara | Khomsar | Khorar | Khorasan Poshteh | Khorasan Sar | Khorma | Khorram Bisheh | Khorram Rud | Khorramabad | Khortab | Khortay | Khortum | Khorum | Khoshk Dahaneh | Khoshk Estalkh | Khoshk Lat | Khoshk Rud | Khoshkarvandan | Khoshk-e Bijar | Khoshk-e Rudbar | Khoshkeh Darya | Khoshknudhan-e Bala | Khoshknudhan-e Pain | Khoshtamdokh | Khosrow Mahalleh | Khosrowabad | Khotbeh Sara | Khubdeh | Khudkar Mahalleh | Khulak | Khursand Kalayeh | Khurtab Sara | Khurtay | Khushal | Khuy Dul | Khvajeh Alivandan | Khvajeh Geri | Khvajeh Kari | Khvod Bechar | Khvor Gardan | Kia Gahan | Kia Kalayeh | Kia Rud | Kia Sara | Kia Sara | Kia Sara | Kiaabad | Kiaban | Kiaramesh | Kiasaj Mahalleh | Kiaseh | Kiashahr | Kinchah | Kisar Varzal | Kisavandan | Kish Darreh | Kish Khaleh | Kish Khaleh | Kish Khaleh | Kish Mahalleh | Kish Posht | Kishakajan | Kishavisheh-ye Olya | Kishavisheh-ye Sofla | Kish-e Rudbar | Kisheh Khani | Kishestan | Kisom | Kisom Jukol | Kofud | Kofud Mozhdeh | Kohneh Gurab | Kohneh Gurab | Kohneh Guyeh-ye Bala | Kohneh Guyeh-ye Pain | Kohneh Hayyat | Kohneh Keh | Kohneh Rudposht | Kohneh Sar | Kohneh Sara | Kohneh Van Sara | Kojid | Kolah Duz Mahalleh | Kolamsar | Kolandi | Kolangaran | Kolangestan | Kolashta Jan | Kolesh Taleshan | Kolka Sara | Kolkuh | Kolsar | Kolta Sar | Kolus Forush | Komadul | Komoni | Konbak | Konesestan | Korchvandan | Kord Gavar | Kord Khil-e Valam | Kord Mahalleh | Kord Mahalleh | Kord Mahalleh | Kord Sara Kuh-e Bala | Kord Sara Kuh-e Pain | Kordabad | Korf Poshteh | Korf Poshteh-ye Galeshi | Korf Poshteh-ye Ilyati | Korf Poshteh-ye Tazehabad | Koshkosh | Koshti Girchak | Kuakari | Kuban | Kuchak Kumsar | Kuchek Deh | Kuchek Mahalleh | Kuchesfahan | Kuchi Chal | Kuchkam | Kudakan | Kudeh | Kugah | Kuh Boneh | Kuh Pas | Kuhbijar | Kuh-e Bon | Kuhestan | Kuhestan | Kuhestan | Kuhestan-e Haviq | Kuji | Kukeneh | Kulaneh | Kulavan | Kuleh Kesh | Kuli Seran | Kumeleh | Kumsar | Kurandeh | Kurbar | Kurcheh Posht | Kureh Bar | Kureh Jan | Kureh Kharem | Kureh Rud | Kureh Rudbar | Kureh Tasheh | Kureh | Kuri Jan | Kurka | Kuryeh | Kushal | Kushal Shad | Kushkuh | Kuteh Kumeh | Kuyeh-ye Olya | Kuyeh-ye Sofla | Kuzan | Kuzeh Garan

=== L ===
Lab-e Darya-ye Lasku Kalayeh | Labeshka | Lachu Mahalleh | Ladmokh | Ladmokh | Lafand Sara | Lafut-e Bala | Lafut-e Pain | Lahashar | Lahijan | Lak Posht | Lakalayeh | Lakan Institute | Lakan | Lakateshem | Lakesar | Lakhteki | Lakmeh Sar | Lakmuj | Lakta Sara | Lakuzhdeh | Lal Kan | Lalakah Mahalleh | Laleh Dasht | Laleh Gafsheh | Lalim | Lalkeh Poshteh | Lalom | Lam Beshkest-e Pain | Lamak Mahalleh-ye Lafmejan | Lamir | Lamir-e Sofla | Lanbeh | Lang | Langarud | Langol | Lapaqa Sadeq | Lapeh Sara | Lapuvandan | Laqan | Lar Dasar | Lardeh | Lardeh | Larsar | Larud | Larzdeh | Larzian | Lasak | Lasbu | Lasbu Mahalleh | Lash | Lasheh | Lasheh | Lashidan-e Hokumati | Lashidan-e Motlaq | Lashkaj | Lashkajan-e Olya | Lashkajan-e Sofla | Lashkan | Lashkarian | Lashmar Zamakh | Lasht-e Nesha | Lasku Kalayeh | Lat Leyl | Lat Mahalleh | Lat Rud | Lat Sara | Lat | Lat | Latain | Latak | Latak | Latan Parat | Lat-e Parshu | Lateh | Lateh | Latin Pard | Latum | Lavabon | Lavali | Lavandevil | Lavar | Lavasi Mahalleh | Layalestan | Layeh | Lecheh Gurab | Lehdarbon | Lelam | Lelekam | Lemir Mahalleh | Lemir | Lemushposht | Lenza | Lenzi | Lerdarabon | Lerudbon | Leshkam | Leyla Kuh | Li Sara | Liafu | Lialehkal-e Bala | Lialehkal-e Pain | Lialeman | Liarjdemeh | Liashur Sara-ye Olya | Liashur Saray-e Ostad Vali | Liashur Sara-ye Sofla | Liasi | Liavol-e Olya | Liavol-e Sofla | Lichah | Lifku Khandan | Lifkuh | Lifshagerd | Lih Kolam | Lijariki-ye Hasan Rud | Lilaki | Lilij Gavaber | Lima Chal | Lima Gavabar | Lima | Limeh Sara | Limu Chah | Lipa | Lir | Lir | Lisar | Lisar Mahalleh | Liseh Rud | Liseh Rud-e Tazehabad | Lisen | Lish | Lisha Kuh | Lishak | Lishki | Lisom | Liyeh Chak | Liyeh | Lor | Losku | Lotf Ali Gavaber | Lovachol | Lowadeh | Lowshan | Lu Sara | Lukh | Lukolayeh | Lulaman | Lunak | Lur | Lurun | Lusha Deh

=== M ===
Maaf Mahalleh | Maaf Vaziri | Machian | Madan-e Sangrud | Madar Sara | Madian Gavaber | Magas Khani | Mahmud Kian | Mahmudabad | Mahraman | Mahruzeh | Mahsayeh | Mahvizan | Makash | Makhsar | Makhshar | Maklavan | Maklavan-e Bala | Maklavan-e Pain | Malal | Malat | Malavan | Malbijar | Maldeh | Malek Rud | Malekdeh | Malekut | Maleskam | Malfejan | Malja Dasht | Mamudan | Mangu Deh | Manjil | Marbu | Mardakheh-ye Bozorg | Mardekheh | Mardekheh-ye Kuchek | Mardomkadeh | Marim Dasht | Marjaghal | Markhal | Markiyeh | Markiyeh | Marsarud | Maryan | Marz Dasht | Marzalat | Masal | Masalakuh | Mashak-e Sepahdari | Mashak-e Tehranchi | Mashal Alam | Mashallah Kol | Mashatuk | Masheh Kah | Mashin Khaneh | Mashkaleh | Mashmian | Masjed Pish | Masjed-e Qabaqi | Masuleh | Masuleh Khani | Matak | Mavardian | Mayestan-e Bala | Mayestan-e Pain | Mazalem Kam | Mazandaran Mahalleh | Mazandaran Mahalleh-ye Bahambar | Mazgah | Mazhdeh Ali | Mazi Bon | Mazi Gavabar | Mazi Kalleh | Mazian | Mazikaleh Poshteh | Mazu Darreh | Mazukaleh Poshteh | Mehdiabad | Mehdikhan Mahalleh | Mehraban | Melaz Gavaber | Menareh Bazar | Merseh | Meshka Posht | Meskin | Mesr Dasht | Metesh | Mian Farirud | Mian Gavaber | Mian Gavaber | Mian Kol | Mian Kuh | Mian Lengeh | Mian Mahalleh | Mian Mahalleh-ye Chaf Gavieh | Mian Mahalleh-ye Gafsheh | Mian Mahalleh-ye Golrudbar | Mian Mahalleh-ye Pap Kiadeh | Mian Mahalleh-ye Rudbaneh | Mian Mahalleh-ye Zakleh Bar | Mian Marz | Mian Poshteh | Mian Rud | Mian Sara | Mian Shekar Kesh | Mianbar | Miandeh | Miandeh | Miandeh | Miandeh-ye Pain | Miangaskar | Mianraz | Mianrud | Mianrud | Mieh Kumeh | Mikal | Milash | Mileh Sara | Mir Daryasar | Mir Mahalleh | Mir Mahalleh | Mir Mahalleh | Mir Mahalleh | Mirag Mahalleh | Miran Mahalleh | Mirsara | Mirza Golband | Mirza Hasan Lengeh | Mishamandan | Mishkasar | Mishkeh | Moaf Amandan | Moaf | Moaf | Mobarakabad | Mobarakabad | Mobarakabad | Mohammad Jafar Mahalleh | Mohammadabad | Moharrum Zumeh | Mohsenabad | Mohsenabad-e Pain | Molk Bogur | Molk Sar | Molk-e Jahan | Molk-e Mian | Molla Bagh | Molla Kuh | Molla Mahalleh | Molla Mahalleh | Molla Mahalleh-ye Chehel Setun | Molla Sara | Molla Sara | Molla Sara | Molumeh | Morad Dahandeh | Mordab Bon | Mordab Sar | Mordvan | Moridan | Moridan | Moshend | Motaalleq Mahalleh-ye Arbastan | Motaalleq Mahalleh-ye Nowbijar | Motal Sara | Motla Dasht | Motla Kuh | Mowmen Zamin | Mozhdeh | Mozhdeheh | Mubandan | Mudegan | Musa Kalayeh | Musa Kuh | Mush Bijar | Mushanga

=== N ===
Nabi Dehga | Nadaman | Nahar-e Khurlat | Najmabad | Nakhjir Kolayeh | Nalband | Namak Avaran | Namak Rudbar | Namazi Mahalleh | Naqaleh Kesh | Narenj Bon | Narenj Dul | Narenj Kelayeh | Narenj Kola-ye Olya | Narenj Kola-ye Sofla | Narenjbon-e Bala | Narenjbon-e Pain | Narenjkol | Nargestan | Narki | Narmash | Naser Kiadeh-ye Mian Mahalleh | Naser Sara | Naseran | Nash | Nashrud Kol | Nasir Mahalleh | Nasrollah Mahalleh | Nasrollahabad | Nasrollahabad | Nasur Mahalleh | Nav | Nav | Navan | Navasar | Nav-e Bala | Nav-e Pain | Naveh | Naveh | Navideh | Nayaji | Nazar Mahalleh | Nazok Sara | Nehzom-e Seyqal Kumeh | Nema Huni | Nemat Sara | Neqareh Chiyan | Nesa | Nesfi | Neshash | Neysa Chah | Niaku | Niasan | Niavol | Nik Kari | Nilash | Nilu Pardeh Sar | Nilu | Nispey | Nofut | Noqareh Chi Mahalleh | Noqreh Deh | Now Bijar Mahalleh-ye Mohsenabad | Now Deh | Now Deh | Now Deh | Now Deh | Now Deh | Now Deh | Now Deh-e Pasikhan | Now Estalakh | Now Gurab | Now Kandeh | Now Kasht | Now Khaleh-ye Akbari | Now Khaleh-ye Jafari | Now Pashan | Nowbijar | Nowdeh | Nowdeh | Nowhadan | Nowmandan | Nowrud | Nowruz Mahalleh | Nowruzabad | Nowshar | Nowshar | Nowsher |

=== O ===
Omesheh | Orkom | Osmavandan | Ostad Kolayeh | Otaqvar | Otur Sara | Owleh Kari-ye Tula Rud | Owlom | Owmandan | Owrma | Owshiyan | Owtar Mahalleh-ye Shirabad | Owtar | Owtar

=== P ===
Pa Chenar | Pa Rudbar | Pach Kenar | Pahmadan | Pain Bijar Ankish | Pain Bolgur | Pain Derazlat | Pain Fidarreh | Pain Gava Sara | Pain Gomol | Pain Halu Sara | Pain Kala Gavabar | Pain Kesh Sara | Pain Kola Mahalleh | Pain Kuyakh | Pain Lamin Jub | Pain Mahalleh-ye Gildeh | Pain Mahalleh-ye Golrudbar | Pain Mahalleh-ye Lafmejan | Pain Mahalleh-ye Nalkiashar | Pain Mahalleh-ye Narakeh | Pain Mahalleh-ye Naser Kiadeh | Pain Mahalleh-ye Pashaki | Pain Mahalleh-ye Qasemabad | Pain Mahalleh-ye Rudbaneh | Pain Mahalleh-ye Zemidan | Pain Narenj Lengeh | Pain Pap Kiadeh | Pain Qazi Mahalleh | Pain Rudposht | Pain Salkuyeh | Pain Shad Deh | Pain Shekar Kesh | Pain Tamushal | Pakdeh | Palam | Palang Darreh | Palang Darreh | Palang Kol | Palang Pareh | Palang Sara | Palangposht | Palasi | Palat Kaleh | Palatdasht | Paluteh | Pamesar | Panabandan | Panchah | Panga Posht | Parandan | Parch Kuh | Pard Sar | Pareh Sar | Pareh | Paresh Kuh | Parka Posht-e Mehdikhani | Parka Posht-e Yavarzadeh | Parshu | Parvin Langeh | Parviz Khani | Pas Bijar Gafsheh | Pas Chavar | Pash-e Olya | Pash-e Sofla | Pashed | Pashkam | Pashkeh | Pashtal Sara | Pasikhan | Pasin Darreh | Paskeh | Pastak | Pastal Kuh | Pasvisheh | Patanak | Patavan | Pelleh Shah | Pelt-e Kalleh Sar | Penu | Peram Kuh | Pey Navand | Peysara | Peysara | Piaghuzbon | Pichah | Pijan | Pil Darreh | Pilam Pastanak | Pilbur | Pileh Bagh | Pileh Darbon | Pileh Mahalleh | Pileh Sara | Pilembera | Piljeh | Pir Ali Deh | Pir Bast-e Luleman | Pir Bazar | Pir Deh | Pir Deh-e Shaft | Pir Kola Chah | Pir Kuh-e Olya | Pir Kuh-e Sofla | Pir Mahalleh | Pir Mowmen Sara | Pir Musa | Pir Poshteh | Pir Sara | Pir Sara | Pir Sara | Pir Sara | Pir-e Harat | Pish Bijar | Pish Deh | Pish Hesar | Pish Kenar | Pish Kuh-e Pain | Pisheh Var | Pishkeli Jan-e Bala | Pishkeli Jan-e Pain | Pishkhan | Pol Darreh | Polku | Porush-e Bala | Porush-e Pain | Poshal | Posht Darreh Lengeh | Posht Mekh | Posht Mesar | Posht Sara | Poshtaleh-ye Sar | Poshteh Hir | Poshteh Kolah | Poshteh Sara | Poshteh | Poshteh | Poshtehan | Poshtir | Poshtir | Poshtsan-e Gur Abjir | Postan Sar | Pudeh | Punel | Pustin Sara

=== Q ===
Qaleh Bin | Qaleh Bin | Qaleh Chal | Qaleh Dush | Qaleh Gardan | Qaleh Gol | Qaleh Kol (Fuman)| Qaleh Kol, Rudbar | Qaleh Rudkhan | Qaleh Za | Qaleh | Qanbar Mahalleh | Qanbar Mahalleh | Qandi Sara | Qaraba | Qarah Dasht | Qarah Suy | Qasemabad-e Sofla | Qassab Mahalleh | Qassab Mahalleh | Qassab Sara | Qassabali Sara | Qazdeh | Qazi Chak | Qazi Gavaber | Qazi Mahalleh | Qaziyan | Qeran | Qeshlaq | Qoruq | Qusheh Laneh

=== R ===
Radar Kumeh | Radar Poshteh | Raftagi | Rahdar Khaneh | Rahijan | Rahimabad | Rahimabad | Rahnama Mahalleh | Raiyyat Mahalleh | Rajab Sara | Rajakol | Rajir | Rajun | Rajurazbaram | Ramezan Bijar | Ramshayeh | Randal | Rangarj Mahalleh | Rankuh | Rashi | Rasht | Rashtabad | Rasmaji | Rasteh Kenar | Rasteh Kenar | Rasteh Kenar | Rasteh Kenar | Rasteh Kenar-e Buin | Ravajir | Raz Darreh | Raz Darrud | Razdar | Razdarestan | Razeh Gardan | Razeh | Razi Nesa | Razin Dul | Razkand | Rebab Chal | Rejah Sara | Renasak Bon | Reshterud | Reza Mahalleh | Reza Mahalleh | Rezvan | Rezvanshahr | Riab | Rik | Rik-e Haviq | Rinch Mahalleh | Risan | Rizeh Mandan | Rofuh Chah | Rokan Sara | Roku | Rostam Mahalleh | Rostamabad | Rowham Beyk Mahalleh | Rowshan Deh | Rowshanabsar-e Bala | Rowshanabsar-e Pain | Rowshandeh | Rubarabr | Rud Bardeh | Rud Gavaber | Rud Kenar | Rud Mianeh | Rud Pish | Rud Posht | Rud Posht | Rud Sar | Rud Sar | Rudabad | Rudbar | Rudbar Chireh | Rudbar Sara | Rudbar Sara | Rudbar Sara | Rudbarak | Rudbaraki | Rudbar-e Deh Sar | Rudboneh | Rudkhaneh | Rudkol | Rudsar | Rum Dasht

=== S ===
Sabz Ali Sara | Sadat Mahalleh | Sadat Mahalleh | Sadat Mahalleh | Sadat Mahalleh | Sadat Mahalleh | Sadat Mahalleh | Safra Basteh | Safsar | Saharkhiz Mahalleh | Sahneh Sara | Sajidan | Sajiran | Sakhibon | Salajan | Salak Deh | Salash | Salash-e Disam | Saleh Kuh | Salehbar | Salek Moallem | Salestan | Salestan | Salim Chaf | Salim Sara | Salimabad | Salkisar | Salu Mahalleh | Samadabad | Sandian | Sang Bijar | Sang Bonag | Sang Jub | Sang Sara | Sang Sarak | Sang Tash | Sangachin | Sangar | Sangdeh | Sangrud | Sangsarud | Sapahar Posht | Saqalaksar | Sar Cheshmeh | Sar Kalleh | Sar Khoshki | Sar Sar | Sar Tarbat | Sara Gavabar | Sara Rud | Saragah | Sarajar | Sarak | Sarakeh | Sarash | Saravan | Saravarsu | Saraydasht | Sardab Huni | Sardab Khaneh Posht | Sardarabad | Sardeh | Sardsar-e Shahi Jan | Sarem | Saremeh | Sareshkeh | Sarfarirud | Sari Cham | Sarleyleh | Sarmastan | Sarsar | Sarvandan | Sarvelat | Sasan Sara | Sasemas | Satlsar | Sattarabad | Sayyad Mahalleh | Sayyadlar | Seda Poshteh | Sedeh | Sefid Khani | Sefid Mazgi | Sefid Rud | Sefid Sangan | Sefid Sangan | Sefiddarbon | Seh Chekeh | Seh Pestanak | Seh Sar | Seh Shanbeh | Sejubsar | Sekam | Selakjan | Selakjan | Seleh Marz | Seleh Yurdi | Seljeh | Send-e Bala | Send-e Pain | Separdan | Serabostan | Seraliveh | Sestelan | Seydgah-e Haviq | Seyqal Boneh | Seyqal Sara | Seyqal Sara | Seyqalan | Seyqalan | Seyqalan | Seyqalan-e Varzal | Seyqaldeh | Seyqaldeh | Seyqalvandan | Seyyed Lar | Seyyed Mahalleh | Seyyed Mahalleh | Seyyed Mahalleh-ye Shirabad | Seyyed Sara | Seyyedabad | Seyyedan | Sezarud | Shabkhus Lat | Shabkhus Pahlu | Shabkhus Sara | Shad Dehsar | Shad Galdi Mahalleh | Shad Kalayeh | Shad Khal | Shad Milarzan | Shad Morad Mahalleh | Shad Morad Mahalleh | Shad Neshin | Shadbondari | Shadkuh | Shadraj-e Olya | Shafa Rud | Shafiabad | Shaft Mahalleh | Shaft | Shaghola | Shah Rasul | Shah-e Shahidan | Shahi Sara | Shahmir Sara | Shahran | Shahr-e Bijar | Shahr-e Somam | Shahrestan | Shahrestan | Shakakom | Shalash Darreh | Shaldeh | Shaldeh | Shaleh Pas | Shaleh Vil | Shalekeh | Shalka | Shalku | Shalma Kuh | Shalma | Shalma | Shalman | Shaltuk | Shams-e Bijar | Shanbeh Bazar | Shandar-e Balnageh | Shanghai Pardeh | Shankavar | Shapul Konar | Sharafshadeh | Sharam Lengeh | Sharam | Sharif Ali Sara | Shekal Gurab-e Bala | Shekal Gurab-e Pain | Shekar Baghan | Shekar Estalkh | Shekar Sara | Shekarkash Mahalleh | Shekarpas | Shelisheh | Shelkeh Banan | Shemam | Shemshad Poshteh | Shemshad Sara | Sheram Dasht | Shesh Kalayeh | Sheshkal | Sheshlu | Sheshtanrud-e Bala | Sheshtanrud-e Pain | Sheykh Ali Bast | Sheykh Ali Kalayeh | Sheykh Ali Mahalleh | Sheykh Ali Tuseh | Sheykh Mahalleh | Sheykh Mahalleh | Sheykh Mahalleh | Sheykh Mahalleh | Sheykh Mahalleh | Sheykh Neshin | Sheykh Sara | Sheykh Zahed Mahalleh | Sheykhabad | Sheykhan Gafsheh | Sheykhanbar | Shijan | Shilan | Shileh Sar | Shileh Vasht | Shir Ali Beyk Mahalleh | Shir Darreh | Shir Kadeh | Shir Kuh | Shir Mahalleh | Shirabad Mahalleh | Shirabad | Shirayeh | Shirayeh | Shirbacheh Pir | Shir-e Tar | Shirin Nesa | Shirju Posht-e Bala | Shirju Posht-e Pain | Shirkuh Mahalleh | Shirkuh-e Chahardeh | Shirva | Shirzeyl | Shishar | Shisharestan | Shisheh Gurab | Shiva | Shiyeh | Sholoqun | Shuil | Shuk | Shulam | Shuleh | Shunan | Shundeh Chula | Si Bostan | Si Na Huni | Si Sara | Siabkun | Siah Bijar | Siah Bil Khushaber | Siah Bil | Siah Bil | Siah Chal | Siah Chal | Siah Darvishan | Siah Dul | Siah Duleh | Siah Estakhr | Siah Estalakh | Siah Estalakh-e Mirza Rabi | Siah Estalakh-e Saqad ol Molk | Siah Estalkh | Siah Galvandan | Siah Gol Chal | Siah Gol | Siah Gurab-e Bala | Siah Gurab-e Pain | Siah Jafar | Siah Kaldeh | Siah Karbon | Siah Kat | Siah Kesh | Siah Kesh | Siah Kesh | Siah Keshan | Siah Khaleh Sar | Siah Khani | Siah Khulak | Siah Koleh | Siah Kord Gavabar | Siah Kucheh | Siah Kuh | Siah Kuh | Siah Larz | Siah Lat | Siah Manseh-ye Bala | Siah Manseh-ye Pain | Siah Mard | Siah Marz-e Gavabar | Siah Mazgi | Siah Piran-e Kashani | Siah Piran-e Kasmai | Siah Rud Kenar | Siah Rud Poshteh | Siah Rudbar | Siah Sufian | Siah Varud | Siah Vazan | Siahbil | Siahkal | Siahkal Mahalleh | Siahkalrud | Siahuni | Siaposht | Siarastaq | Siavan Mahalleh | Siavi | Sibeli | Sibon | Sifeh Dasht | Sigarud | Sigh Chal | Sij | Sikash | Silab Kesh | Sileh Sar | Simbari Khaleh | Sivasarak | Sivir | Siyahtan | Siyun Sar | Soleyman Chapar | Soleyman Darab-e Bala | Soli | Soltan Moradi | Soltan Sara | Soluk Bon-e Olya | Soluk Bon-e Sofla | Soluk Bon-e Vosta | Solush | Sondos | Sopordan | Sorkh Taleh | Sorkhani | Sowme'eh Sara | Sowt Gavaber | Su Gavaber | Su Gavabor | Su Kacha | Su Sara | Sufian Deh | Sufian Sar | Sukhteh Kish | Sukhteh Kosh | Sukhteh Kuh | Sukhteh Kuh | Sukhteh Luleh | Suli Mahalleh | Suqeh | Sur Shafilat | Suraposht | Surchan Mahalleh | Surkuh | Surom | Sust | Sustan | Sutapara

=== T ===
Tabaq Sar | Tabar Kalayeh | Tabar Sara | Tabestan Neshin | Tabtus | Taham | Taher Beyk Mahalleh | Taher Gurab | Tahmas Gavabar | Tajan Gukeh | Tajan | Takhteh Puri | Takhteh | Takiabad | Takram | Tala Bar | Talab Darreh | Talabon | Talabonak | Talakuh | Taleb Sara | Talebabad | Taleh Gongah | Taleh Mian | Taleh Sar | Talem Seh Shanbeh | Taleqan | Talesh Kuh | Talesh Mahalleh | Talesh Mahalleh | Talesh Mahalleh | Talesh Mahalleh-ye Bahambar | Taleshan | Talijan Kar | Talikan | Talisin | Tamal | Tamchal | Tamijan | Tamsheh Lameh | Tan Dabin | Tanazarud | Tanbu | Tang Darreh | Tang Rud | Tangab | Tangdeh Tul Gilan | Tani Mahalleh | Tanian | Tappeh | Taqi Sara | Taraz Kuh | Taresh | Tarik Darreh | Tarom Sar | Tarom Sara | Tarom Sara | Tarpu | Tarshabur | Tasandeh | Tash Kola | Tash | Taskuh | Tataf | Tataf Rud | Tavasankesh | Tazehabad | Tazehabad | Tazehabad | Tazehabad | Tazehabad | Tazehabad | Tazehabad | Tazehabad | Tazehabad | Tazehabad | Tazehabad-e Chaf | Tazehabad-e Chomaqestan | Tazehabad-e Fushazdeh | Tazehabad-e Jankah | Tazehabad-e Kalashem | Tazehabad-e Khachekin | Tazehabad-e Kord Sara Kuh | Tazehabad-e Marzian | Tazehabad-e Narakeh | Tazehabad-e Pasikhan | Tazehabad-e Sadar | Tekhsem | Teleh Khan | Teymur Kuh | Tiksar | Tisiyeh | Titak | Titi Karvansara | Titi Parizad | Tiyeh | Tokam | Tolum Khani | Tomajan | Torbeh Bar | Torbehgudeh | Tork Mahalleh | Tork Mahalleh | Tork Mahalleh-ye Alalan | Tork Neshin Lowshan | Torshayeh | Torshkuh | Tuchah-e Alman | Tuchi Payeh Bast | Tui Dasht | Tukamjan | Tukandeh | Tukas | Tuksar-e Shijan | Tul Lat | Tula Rud-e Bala | Tula Rud-e Pain | Tulay-e Bala | Tulay-e Pain | Turan Sara | Tuseh Chaleh | Tuseh Kaleh | Tuseh Rud | Tuseh Sara | Tusheh Mian | Tushi | Tuska Mahalleh-ye Qasemabad | Tusowdasht | Tustan | Tut Kaleh-ye Olya | Tut Kaleh-ye Sofla | Tutaki | Tutkabon | Tutnesa | Tuysaravandan

=== U ===
Uleh Kari Asalem

=== V ===
Vagalkhani | Vailjar | Vajargah | Valad | Valani | Valeh Chul | Vali Sara | Valiseh | Vandarkesh | Vanegah | Vaneh Khuni | Vanistan | Vapar Sar | Vaqeeh Dasht | Vaqfi | Varazgah | Varbon | Vardeh Sara | Vardum | Vargeh Darreh | Varkureh | Varmiyeh | Vasmeh Jan | Vazesht | Vazmi | Vazneh Sar | Veshmeh Sara | Vezmana | Vezmtar | Virmuni | Vishan | Visheh Sara | Visheh Sara | Vishka | Vishka Matir | Vishka Nanak | Vishka Suqeh | Vishka Varzal | Vishkhes Mahalleh | Vishki | Visrud | Viyeh | Vizadasht | Viznah | Vosi

=== Y ===
Ya Ali Gavabar | Yakavarak | Yareshlaman | Yari Mahalleh | Yasan | Yasur | Yeganeh Mahalleh | Yeknam | Yeylaq-e Viznah| Yeylaqi-ye Dugaheh | Yeylaqi-ye Darestan | Yeylaqi-ye Lakeh | Yusef Deh | Yusef Mahalleh | Yusefabad | Yusefabad | Yusefabad

=== Z ===
Zafan | Zahandeh | Zahun Bareh | Zakabar | Zaman Mahalleh | Zandeh Kesh | Zangulbareh | Zarabcheh | Zaraki | Zarang Mahalleh | Zarbil | Zard Dul | Zard Kesh | Zardeh Lajeh | Zardkam | Zarem Kalayeh | Zargush | Zarkam | Zarkolam | Zarreh Zhieh | Zemidan | Zemidan Sara | Zemidan-e Bala | Zenash | Zenash Darreh | Zendaneh | Zeydi | Zia Kuh | Ziabar | Ziaratgah | Ziaz | Ziaz Mahalleh | Zideh-ye Bala | Zideh-ye Pain | Ziksar | Zimsar | Zin Poshteh | Zir Deh | Zir Deh | Zizakesh | Zohrab Ali Sara | Zomori | Zormi | Zowl Piran | Zudel | Zurzemeh
