= Khoshk Lat =

Khoshk Lat خشكلات
- Village
- Location within Iran
- Coordinates: 37°02′28″N 50°26′29″E
- Country: Iran
- Province: Gilan
- County: Rudsar
- Bakhsh: Chaboksar
- Rural District: Siahkalrud

Population (2006)
  - Total: 330
- Time zone: UTC+3:30 (IRST)
  - Summer (DST): UTC+4:30 (IRDT)

Khoshk Lat (Persian: خشكلات, also Romanized as Khoshk Lāt; also known as Khoshkeh Lāt and Khoshken Lāt) is a village in Siahkalrud Rural District, Chaboksar District, Rudsar County, Gilan Province, Iran. During the 2006 census, its population was 330, in 105 families.
