= Kureh Tasheh =

Kureh Tasheh كوره تاشه
- Village
- Location within Iran
- Coordinates: 37°01′21″N 50°16′41″E
- Country: Iran
- Province: Gilan
- County: Rudsar
- Bakhsh: Kelachay
- Rural District: Machian

Population (2006)
  - Total: 157
- Time zone: UTC+3:30 (IRST)
  - Summer (DST): UTC+4:30 (IRDT)

Kureh Tasheh (Persian: كوره تاشه, also Romanized as Kūreh Tāsheh) is a village in Machian Rural District, Kelachay District, Rudsar County, Gilan Province, Iran. At the 2006 census, its population was 157, in 37 families.
