= Mazikaleh Poshteh =

Village in Gilan, Iran

Mazikaleh Poshteh مازي كله پشته
- Village
- Location within Iran
- Coordinates: 36°56′00″N 50°33′00″E
- Country: Iran
- Province: Gilan
- County: Rudsar
- Bakhsh: Chaboksar
- Rural District: Owshiyan

Population (2006)
  - Total: 17
- Time zone: UTC+3:30 (IRST)
  - Summer (DST): UTC+4:30 (IRDT)

Mazikaleh Poshteh (Persian: مازي كله پشته, also Romanized as Māzīkaleh Poshteh; also known as Māzūkalā Poshteh) is a village in Owshiyan Rural District, Chaboksar District, Rudsar County, Gilan Province, Iran. At the 2006 census, its population was 17, in 6 families.
