= Mordab Sar =

Mordab Sar مردابسر
- Village
- Location within Iran
- Coordinates: 37°04′43″N 50°17′59″E
- Country: Iran
- Province: Gilan
- County: Rudsar
- Bakhsh: Central
- Rural District: Reza Mahalleh

Population (2006)
  - Total: 167
- Time zone: UTC+3:30 (IRST)
  - Summer (DST): UTC+4:30 (IRDT)

Mordab Sar (Persian: مردابسر, also Romanized as Mordāb Sar) is a village in Reza Mahalleh Rural District, in the Central District of Rudsar County, Gilan Province, Iran. At the 2006 census, its population was 167, in 57 families.
