= Balengah =

Balengah بالنگاه
- Village
- Location within Iran
- Coordinates: 37°00′56″N 50°18′17″E
- Country: Iran
- Province: Gilan
- County: Rudsar
- Bakhsh: Rahimabad
- Rural District: Rahimabad

Population (2006)
  - Total: 891
- Time zone: UTC+3:30 (IRST)
  - Summer (DST): UTC+4:30 (IRDT)

Balengah (Persian: بالنگاه, also Romanized as Bālengāh; also known as Bālanak, Bālengā, and Bālenkā) is a village in Rahimabad Rural District, Rahimabad District, Rudsar County, Gilan Province, Iran. At the 2006 census, its population was 891, in 255 families.
