= Taleh Mian =

Taleh Mian تله ميان
- Village
- Location within Iran
- Coordinates: 36°58′53″N 50°26′29″E
- Country: Iran
- Province: Gilan
- County: Rudsar
- Bakhsh: Chaboksar
- Rural District: Siahkalrud

Population (2006)
  - Total: 20
- Time zone: UTC+3:30 (IRST)
  - Summer (DST): UTC+4:30 (IRDT)

Taleh Mian (Persian: تله ميان, also Romanized as Taleh Mīān; also known as Talamaneh) is a village in Siahkalrud Rural District, Chaboksar District, Rudsar County, Gilan Province, Iran. At the 2006 census, its population was 20, in 5 families.
