= Jong Sara =

Jang Sara جنگسرا
- Village
- Location within Iran
- Coordinates: 36°56′38″N 50°33′12″E
- Country: Iran
- Province: Gilan
- County: Rudsar
- Bakhsh: Chaboksar
- Rural District: Owshiyan

Population (2006)
  - Total: 477
- Time zone: UTC+3:30 (IRST)
  - Summer (DST): UTC+4:30 (IRDT)

Jong Sara (Persian: جنگسرا, also Romanized as Jong Sarā) is a village in Owshiyan Rural District, Chaboksar District, Rudsar County, Gilan Province, Iran. At the 2006 census, its population was 477, in 131 families.
