= Areh Chak =

Areh Chak اره چاك
- Village
- Location within Iran
- Coordinates: 36°41′50″N 50°20′29″E
- Country: Iran
- Province: Gilan
- County: Rudsar
- Bakhsh: Rahimabad
- Rural District: Siyarastaq Yeylaq

Population (2006)
  - Total: 15
- Time zone: UTC+3:30 (IRST)
  - Summer (DST): UTC+4:30 (IRDT)

Areh Chak (Persian: اره چاك, also Romanized as Areh Chāk) is a village in Siyarastaq Yeylaq Rural District, Rahimabad District, Rudsar County, Gilan Province, Iran. At the 2006 census, its population was 15, in 5 families.
