= Bahador Mahalleh =

Bahador Mahalleh بهادرمحله
- Village
- Location within Iran
- Coordinates: 37°05′38″N 50°19′36″E
- Country: Iran
- Province: Gilan
- County: Rudsar
- Bakhsh: Central
- Rural District: Reza Mahalleh

Population (2006)
  - Total: 92
- Time zone: UTC+3:30 (IRST)
  - Summer (DST): UTC+4:30 (IRDT)

Bahador Mahalleh (Persian: بهادرمحله, also Romanized as Bahādor Maḩalleh) is a village in Reza Mahalleh Rural District, in the Central District of Rudsar County, Gilan Province, Iran. At the 2006 census, its population was 92, in 29 families.
