= Parshu =

Parshu پرشو
- Village
- Location within Iran
- Coordinates: 36°57′00″N 50°14′00″E
- Country: Iran
- Province: Gilan
- County: Rudsar
- Bakhsh: Rahimabad
- Rural District: Rahimabad

Population (2006)
  - Total: 180
- Time zone: UTC+3:30 (IRST)
  - Summer (DST): UTC+4:30 (IRDT)

Parshu (Persian: پرشو, also Romanized as Parshū) is a village in Rahimabad Rural District, Rahimabad District, Rudsar County, Gilan Province, Iran. At the 2006 census, its population was 180, in 46 families.
