= Shemshad Sara =

Shemshad Sara شمشادسرا
- Village
- Location within Iran
- Coordinates: 36°58′52″N 50°16′22″E
- Country: Iran
- Province: Gilan
- County: Rudsar
- Bakhsh: Rahimabad
- Rural District: Rahimabad

Population (2006)
  - Total: 190
- Time zone: UTC+3:30 (IRST)
  - Summer (DST): UTC+4:30 (IRDT)

Shemshad Sara (Persian: شمشادسرا, also Romanized as Shemshād Sarā) is a village in Rahimabad Rural District, Rahimabad District, Rudsar County, Gilan Province, Iran. At the 2006 census, its population was 190, in 43 families.
