= Do Gol Sar =

Do Gol Sar دوگل سر
- Village
- Location within Iran
- Coordinates: 36°58′34″N 50°31′54″E
- Country: Iran
- Province: Gilan
- County: Rudsar
- Bakhsh: Chaboksar
- Rural District: Owshiyan

Population (2006)
  - Total: 95
- Time zone: UTC+3:30 (IRST)
  - Summer (DST): UTC+4:30 (IRDT)

Do Gol Sar (Persian: دوگل سر; also known as Do Kal Sarā) is a village in Owshiyan Rural District, Chaboksar District, Rudsar County, Gilan Province, Iran. At the 2006 census, its population was 95, in 26 families.
