= Zaraki =

Zaraki زراكي
- Village
- Location within Iran
- Coordinates: 36°47′48″N 50°12′24″E
- Country: Iran
- Province: Gilan
- County: Rudsar
- Bakhsh: Rahimabad
- Rural District: Shuil

Population (2006)
  - Total: 95
- Time zone: UTC+3:30 (IRST)
  - Summer (DST): UTC+4:30 (IRDT)

Zaraki (Persian: زراكي, also Romanized as Zarakī and Zarākī) is a village in Shuil Rural District, Rahimabad District, Rudsar County, Gilan province, Iran. At the 2006 census, its population was 95, in 25 families.
