= Lakalayeh =

Lakelayeh لاكلايه
- Village
- Location within Iran
- Coordinates: 37°04′27″N 50°18′00″E
- Country: Iran
- Province: Gilan
- County: Rudsar
- Bakhsh: Central
- Rural District: Reza Mahalleh

Population (2006)
  - Total: 203
- Time zone: UTC+3:30 (IRST)
  - Summer (DST): UTC+4:30 (IRDT)

Lakelayeh (Persian: لاكلايه, also Romanized as Lākelāyeh) is a village in Reza Mahalleh Rural District, in the Central District of Rudsar County, Gilan Province, Iran. At the 2006 census, its population was 203, in 58 families.
