= Mordab Bon =

Mordab Bon مرداب بن
- Village
- Location within Iran
- Coordinates: 37°06′10″N 50°17′10″E
- Country: Iran
- Province: Gilan
- County: Rudsar
- Bakhsh: Central
- Rural District: Reza Mahalleh

Population (2006)
  - Total: 176
- Time zone: UTC+3:30 (IRST)
  - Summer (DST): UTC+4:30 (IRDT)

Mordab Bon (Persian: مرداب بن, also Romanized as Mordāb Bon) is a village in Reza Mahalleh Rural District, in the Central District of Rudsar County, Gilan Province, Iran. At the 2006 census, its population was 176, in 51 families.
