= Vapar Sar =

Vapar Sar وپرسر
- Village
- Location within Iran
- Coordinates: 36°54′00″N 50°17′00″E
- Country: Iran
- Province: Gilan
- County: Rudsar
- Bakhsh: Rahimabad
- Rural District: Rahimabad

Population (2006)
  - Total: 24
- Time zone: UTC+3:30 (IRST)
  - Summer (DST): UTC+4:30 (IRDT)

Vapar Sar (Persian: وپرسر; also known as Vafar Sar) is a village in Rahimabad Rural District, Rahimabad District, Rudsar County, Gilan Province, Iran. At the 2006 census, its population was 24, in 5 families.
