= Parandan =

Parandan پرندان
- Village
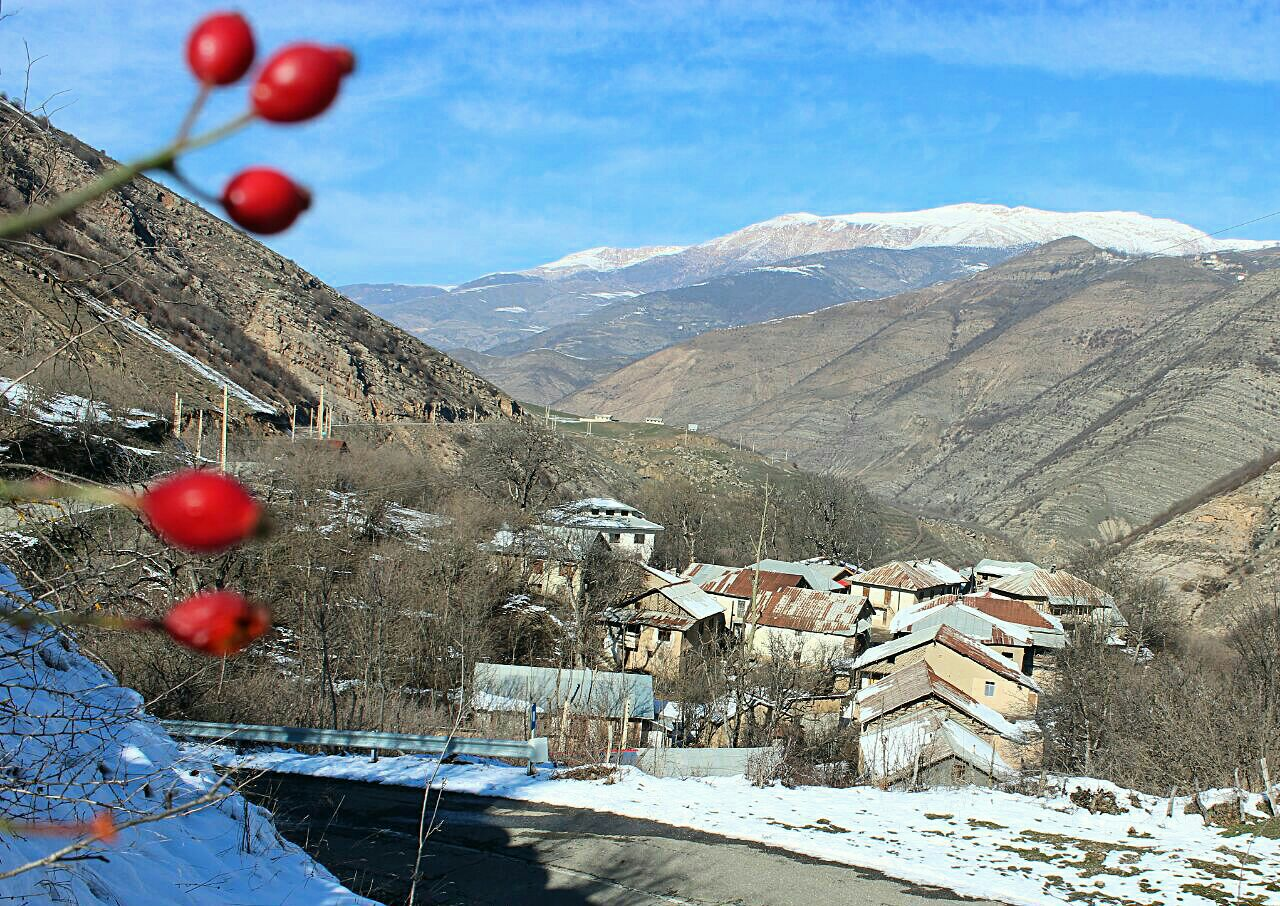

- Location within Iran
- Coordinates: 36°41′59″N 50°21′10″E
- Country: Iran
- Province: Gilan
- County: Rudsar
- Bakhsh: Rahimabad
- Rural District: Siyarastaq Yeylaq

Population (2006)
  - Total: 60
- Time zone: UTC+3:30 (IRST)
  - Summer (DST): UTC+4:30 (IRDT)

Parandan (Persian: پرندان, also Romanized as Parandān) is a village in Siyarastaq Yeylaq Rural District, Rahimabad District, Rudsar County, Gilan Province, Iran. At the 2006 census, its population was 60, in 17 families.
