= Mirza Hasan Lengeh =

Mirza Hasan Lengeh ميرزاحسن لنگه
- Village
- Country: Iran
- Province: Gilan
- County: Rudsar
- Bakhsh: Kelachay
- Rural District: Machian

Population (2006)
  - Total: 84
- Time zone: UTC+3:30 (IRST)
  - Summer (DST): UTC+4:30 (IRDT)

Mirza Hasan Lengeh (Persian: ميرزاحسن لنگه, also Romanized as Mīrzā Ḩasan Lengeh) is a village in Machian Rural District, Kelachay District, Rudsar County, Gilan Province, Iran. At the 2006 census, its population was 84, in 22 families.
