= Ir Mahalleh =

Ir Mahalleh ايرمحله
- Village
- Location within Iran
- Coordinates: 36°46′27″N 50°10′34″E
- Country: Iran
- Province: Gilan
- County: Rudsar
- Bakhsh: Rahimabad
- Rural District: Shuil

Population (2006)
  - Total: 36
- Time zone: UTC+3:30 (IRST)
  - Summer (DST): UTC+4:30 (IRDT)

Ir Mahalleh (Persian: ايرمحله, also Romanized as Īr Maḩalleh) is a village in Shuil Rural District, Rahimabad District, Rudsar County, Gilan Province, Iran. At the 2006 census, its population was 36, in 14 families.
