= Amir Gavabor =

Amir Gavabor اميرگوابر
- Village
- Location within Iran
- Coordinates: 36°58′49″N 50°18′28″E
- Country: Iran
- Province: Gilan
- County: Rudsar
- Bakhsh: Rahimabad
- Rural District: Rahimabad

Population (2006)
  - Total: 143
- Time zone: UTC+3:30 (IRST)
  - Summer (DST): UTC+4:30 (IRDT)

Amir Gavabor (Persian: اميرگوابر, also Romanized as Amīr Gavābor) is a village in Rahimabad Rural District, Rahimabad District, Rudsar County, Gilan Province, Iran. At the 2006 census, its population was 143, in 33 families.
