= Shahi Sara =

Shahi Sara شاهي سرا
- Village
- Location within Iran
- Coordinates: 37°06′55″N 50°14′34″E
- Country: Iran
- Province: Gilan
- County: Rudsar
- Bakhsh: Kelachay
- Rural District: Machian

Population (2006)
  - Total: 61
- Time zone: UTC+3:30 (IRST)
  - Summer (DST): UTC+4:30 (IRDT)

Shahi Sara (Persian: شاهي سرا, also Romanized as Shāhī Sarā; also known as Khomeynī Sarā and Shāh Sarā) is a village in Machian Rural District, Kelachay District, Rudsar County, Gilan Province, Iran. At the 2006 census, its population was 61, in 19 families.
