= Dustkuh =

Dustkuh دوستكوه
- Village
- Location within Iran
- Coordinates: 37°06′33″N 50°19′26″E
- Country: Iran
- Province: Gilan
- County: Rudsar
- Bakhsh: Central
- Rural District: Reza Mahalleh

Population (2006)
  - Total: 269
- Time zone: UTC+3:30 (IRST)
  - Summer (DST): UTC+4:30 (IRDT)

Dustkuh (Persian: دوستكوه, also Romanized as Dūstkūh; also known as Dūstkadeh and Dūstkū) is a village in Reza Mahalleh Rural District, in the Central District of Rudsar County, Gilan Province, Iran. At the 2006 census, its population was 269, in 83 families.
