= Ali Owsat Mahalleh =

Ali Owsat Mahalleh علي اوسطمحله
- Village
- Location within Iran
- Coordinates: 37°03′28″N 50°20′44″E
- Country: Iran
- Province: Gilan
- County: Rudsar
- Bakhsh: Kelachay
- Rural District: Machian

Population (2006)
  - Total: 120
- Time zone: UTC+3:30 (IRST)
  - Summer (DST): UTC+4:30 (IRDT)

Ali Owsat Mahalleh (Persian: علي اوسطمحله, also Romanized as ‘Alī Owsaţ Maḩalleh) is a village in Machian Rural District, Kelachay District, Rudsar County, Gilan Province, Iran. At the 2006 census, its population was 120, in 32 families.
