= Tavasankesh =

Tavasankesh تواسانكش
- Village
- Location within Iran
- Coordinates: 36°47′51″N 50°16′06″E
- Country: Iran
- Province: Gilan
- County: Rudsar
- Bakhsh: Rahimabad
- Rural District: Eshkevar-e Sofla

Population (2006)
  - Total: 56
- Time zone: UTC+3:30 (IRST)
  - Summer (DST): UTC+4:30 (IRDT)

Tavasankesh (Persian: تواسانكش, also Romanized as Tavāsānkesh) is a village in Eshkevar-e Sofla Rural District, Rahimabad District, Rudsar County, Gilan Province, Iran. At the 2006 census, its population was 56, in 16 families.
