= Pain Kola Mahalleh =

Pain Kola Mahalleh پائين كلامحله
- Village
- Country: Iran
- Province: Gilan
- County: Rudsar
- Bakhsh: Kelachay
- Rural District: Machian

Population (2006)
  - Total: 72
- Time zone: UTC+3:30 (IRST)
  - Summer (DST): UTC+4:30 (IRDT)

Pain Kola Mahalleh (Persian: پائين كلامحله, also Romanized as Pā’īn Kolā Maḩalleh) is a village in Machian Rural District, Kelachay District, Rudsar County, Gilan Province, Iran. At the 2006 census, its population was 72, in 20 families.
