= Dula Gavabar =

Dula Gavabar دولاگوابر
- Village
- Location within Iran
- Coordinates: 37°00′04″N 50°18′10″E
- Country: Iran
- Province: Gilan
- County: Rudsar
- Bakhsh: Rahimabad
- Rural District: Rahimabad

Population (2006)
  - Total: 95
- Time zone: UTC+3:30 (IRST)
  - Summer (DST): UTC+4:30 (IRDT)

Dula Gavabar (Persian: دولاگوابر, also Romanized as Dūlā Gavābar; also known as Dolā Gavābar and Dūlā Gāvbar) is a village in Rahimabad Rural District, Rahimabad District, Rudsar County, Gilan Province, Iran. At the 2006 census, its population was 95, in 24 families.
