= Dada Mahalleh =

Dada Mahalleh دادامحله
- Village
- Location within Iran
- Coordinates: 37°05′30″N 50°18′17″E
- Country: Iran
- Province: Gilan
- County: Rudsar
- Bakhsh: Kelachay
- Rural District: Machian

Population (2006)
  - Total: 124
- Time zone: UTC+3:30 (IRST)
  - Summer (DST): UTC+4:30 (IRDT)

Dada Mahalleh (Persian: دادامحله, also Romanized as Dādā Maḩalleh; also known as Dādād Maḩalleh) is a village in Machian Rural District, Kelachay District, Rudsar County, Gilan Province, Iran. At the 2006 census, its population was 124, in 36 families.
