= Sangsarud =

Sangsarud سنگسرود
- Village
- Location within Iran
- Coordinates: 36°42′10″N 50°21′10″E
- Country: Iran
- Province: Gilan
- County: Rudsar
- Bakhsh: Rahimabad
- Rural District: Siyarastaq Yeylaq

Population (2006)
  - Total: 8
- Time zone: UTC+3:30 (IRST)
  - Summer (DST): UTC+4:30 (IRDT)

Sangsarud (Persian: سنگسرود, also Romanized as Sangsarūd; also known as Sang Sar Rūd) is a village in Siyarastaq Yeylaq Rural District, Rahimabad District, Rudsar County, Gilan Province, Iran. At the 2006 census, its population was 8, in 4 families.
