= Tuseh Chaleh =

Tuseh Chaleh توسه چاله
- Village
- Location within Iran
- Coordinates: 36°46′27″N 50°07′38″E
- Country: Iran
- Province: Gilan
- County: Rudsar
- Bakhsh: Rahimabad
- Rural District: Shuil

Population (2006)
  - Total: 79
- Time zone: UTC+3:30 (IRST)
  - Summer (DST): UTC+4:30 (IRDT)

Tuseh Chaleh (Persian: توسه چاله, also Romanized as Tūseh Chāleh; also known as Tūseh Chālak) is a village in Shuil Rural District, Rahimabad District, Rudsar County, Gilan Province, Iran. At the 2006 census, its population was 79.
