= Kabutar Abkesh =

Kabutar Abkesh كبوترابكش
- Village
- Location within Iran
- Coordinates: 36°58′26″N 50°31′41″E
- Country: Iran
- Province: Gilan
- County: Rudsar
- Bakhsh: Chaboksar
- Rural District: Owshiyan

Population (2006)
  - Total: 344
- Time zone: UTC+3:30 (IRST)
  - Summer (DST): UTC+4:30 (IRDT)

Kabutar Abkesh (Persian: كبوترابكش, also Romanized as Kabūtar Ābkesh) is a village in Owshiyan Rural District, Chaboksar District, Rudsar County, Gilan Province, Iran. At the 2006 census, its population was 344, in 94 families.
