= Zurzemeh =

Zurzemeh زورزمه
- Village
- Location within Iran
- Coordinates: 36°53′49″N 50°14′45″E
- Country: Iran
- Province: Gilan
- County: Rudsar
- Bakhsh: Rahimabad
- Rural District: Eshkevar-e Sofla

Population (2006)
  - Total: 74
- Time zone: UTC+3:30 (IRST)
  - Summer (DST): UTC+4:30 (IRDT)

Zurzemeh (Persian: زورزمه, also Romanized as Zūrzemeh) is a village in Eshkevar-e Sofla Rural District, Rahimabad District, Rudsar County, Gilan Province, Iran. At the 2006 census, its population was 74, in 22 families.
