= Fekejur =

Fekejur فكجور
- Village
- Location within Iran
- Coordinates: 36°58′39″N 50°30′57″E
- Country: Iran
- Province: Gilan
- County: Rudsar
- Bakhsh: Chaboksar
- Rural District: Owshiyan

Population (2006)
  - Total: 451
- Time zone: UTC+3:30 (IRST)
  - Summer (DST): UTC+4:30 (IRDT)

Fekejur (Persian: فكجور, also Romanized as Fekejūr; also known as Fīkīchūr) is a village in Owshiyan Rural District, Chaboksar District, Rudsar County, Gilan Province, Iran. At the 2006 census, its population was 451, in 128 families.
