= Chakrud =

Chakrud چكرود
- Village
- Location within Iran
- Coordinates: 36°41′06″N 50°18′17″E
- Country: Iran
- Province: Gilan
- County: Rudsar
- Bakhsh: Rahimabad
- Rural District: Siyarastaq Yeylaq

Population (2016)
  - Total: 71
- Time zone: UTC+3:30 (IRST)

Chakrud (Persian: چكرود, also Romanized as Chakrūd) is a village in Siyarastaq Yeylaq Rural District, Rahimabad District, Rudsar County, Gilan Province, Iran.

At the time of the 2006 National Census, the village's population was 22 in 6 households. The following census in 2011 counted 10 people in 4 households. The 2016 census measured the population of the village as 71 people in 22 households.
