= Siah Gol Chal =

Siah Gol Chal سياه گل چال
- Village
- Location within Iran
- Coordinates: 36°57′00″N 50°13′00″E
- Country: Iran
- Province: Gilan
- County: Rudsar
- Bakhsh: Rahimabad
- Rural District: Rahimabad

Population (2006)
  - Total: 147
- Time zone: UTC+3:30 (IRST)
  - Summer (DST): UTC+4:30 (IRDT)

Siah Gol Chal (Persian: سياه گل چال, also Romanized as Sīāh Gol Chāl; also known as Sīāhkal Chāl) is a village in Rahimabad Rural District, Rahimabad District, Rudsar County, Gilan Province, Iran. At the 2006 census, its population was 147, in 33 families.
