= Jowr Sara =

Jowr Sara جورسرا
- Village
- Location within Iran
- Coordinates: 37°00′10″N 50°23′58″E
- Country: Iran
- Province: Gilan
- County: Rudsar
- Bakhsh: Kelachay
- Rural District: Bibalan

Population (2006)
  - Total: 49
- Time zone: UTC+3:30 (IRST)
  - Summer (DST): UTC+4:30 (IRDT)

Jowr Sara (Persian: جورسرا, also romanized as Jowr Sarā) is a village in Bibalan Rural District, Kelachay District, Rudsar County, Gilan Province, Iran. At the 2006 census, its population was 49, in 10 families.
