= Khan Kasaray-e Olya =

Khan Kasaray-e Olya خانكسراي عليا
- Village
- Location within Iran
- Coordinates: 36°57′00″N 50°17′00″E
- Country: Iran
- Province: Gilan
- County: Rudsar
- Bakhsh: Rahimabad
- Rural District: Rahimabad

Population (2006)
  - Total: 54
- Time zone: UTC+3:30 (IRST)
  - Summer (DST): UTC+4:30 (IRDT)

Khan Kasaray-e Olya (Persian: خانكسراي عليا, also Romanized as Khān Kasarāy-e ‘Olyā; also known as Khāneh Kāsarāy) is a village in Rahimabad Rural District, Rahimabad District, Rudsar County, Gilan Province, Iran. At the 2006 census, its population was 54, in 12 families.
