= Palatdasht =

Palatdasht پلطدشت
- Village
- Location within Iran
- Coordinates: 37°01′04″N 50°21′24″E
- Country: Iran
- Province: Gilan
- County: Rudsar
- Bakhsh: Rahimabad
- Rural District: Rahimabad

Population (2006)
  - Total: 99
- Time zone: UTC+3:30 (IRST)
  - Summer (DST): UTC+4:30 (IRDT)

Palatdasht (Persian: پلطدشت, also Romanized as Palaţdasht) is a village in Rahimabad Rural District, Rahimabad District, Rudsar County, Gilan Province, Iran. At the 2006 census, its population was 99, in 27 families.
