= Taleh Sar, Rahimabad =

Taleh Sar تله سر
- Village
- Location within Iran
- Coordinates: 36°50′07″N 50°13′46″E
- Country: Iran
- Province: Gilan
- County: Rudsar
- Bakhsh: Rahimabad
- Rural District: Shuil

Population (2006)
  - Total: 25
- Time zone: UTC+3:30 (IRST)
  - Summer (DST): UTC+4:30 (IRDT)

Taleh Sar (Persian: تله سر) is a village in Shuil Rural District, Rahimabad District, Rudsar County, Gilan Province, Iran. At the 2006 census, its population was 25, in 8 families.
