= Guzalbon =

Guzalbon گوزلبن
- Village
- Location within Iran
- Coordinates: 36°59′36″N 50°20′52″E
- Country: Iran
- Province: Gilan
- County: Rudsar
- Bakhsh: Rahimabad
- Rural District: Rahimabad

Population (2006)
  - Total: 248
- Time zone: UTC+3:30 (IRST)
  - Summer (DST): UTC+4:30 (IRDT)

Guzalbon (Persian: گوزلبن, also Romanized as Gūzalbon; also known as Gazal Bon) is a village in Rahimabad Rural District, Rahimabad District, Rudsar County, Gilan Province, Iran. At the 2006 census, its population was 248, in 65 families.
