= Khursand Kalayeh =

Khursand Kalayeh خورسندكلايه
- Village
- Location within Iran
- Coordinates: 36°49′29″N 50°13′14″E
- Country: Iran
- Province: Gilan
- County: Rudsar
- Bakhsh: Rahimabad
- Rural District: Shuil

Population (2006)
  - Total: 14
- Time zone: UTC+3:30 (IRST)
  - Summer (DST): UTC+4:30 (IRDT)

Khursand Kalayeh (Persian: خورسندكلايه, also Romanized as Khūrsand Kalāyeh; also known as Khorsand Kalāyeh) is a village in Shuil Rural District, Rahimabad District, Rudsar County, Gilan Province, Iran. At the 2006 census, its population was 14, in 4 families.
