= Lat-e Parshu =

Lat-e Parshu لات پرشو
- Village
- Location within Iran
- Coordinates: 36°57′31″N 50°16′19″E
- Country: Iran
- Province: Gilan
- County: Rudsar
- Bakhsh: Rahimabad
- Rural District: Rahimabad

Population (2006)
  - Total: 38
- Time zone: UTC+3:30 (IRST)
  - Summer (DST): UTC+4:30 (IRDT)

Lat-e Parshu (Persian: لات پرشو, also Romanized as Lāt-e Parshū; also known as Lāt-e Parūsheh) is a village in Rahimabad Rural District, Rahimabad District, Rudsar County, Gilan Province, Iran. At the 2006 census, its population was 38, in 7 families.
