= Sorkhani =

Sorkhani سرخاني
- Village
- Location within Iran
- Coordinates: 36°57′15″N 50°34′56″E
- Country: Iran
- Province: Gilan
- County: Rudsar
- Bakhsh: Chaboksar
- Rural District: Owshiyan

Population (2006)
  - Total: 294
- Time zone: UTC+3:30 (IRST)

Sorkhani (Persian: سرخاني, also Romanized as Sorkhānī) is a village in Owshiyan Rural District, Chaboksar District, Rudsar County, Gilan Province, Iran, near the border with Mazandaran Province. At the 2016 census, its population was 244, in 79 families.
