= Palam, Iran =

Polam پلام
- Village
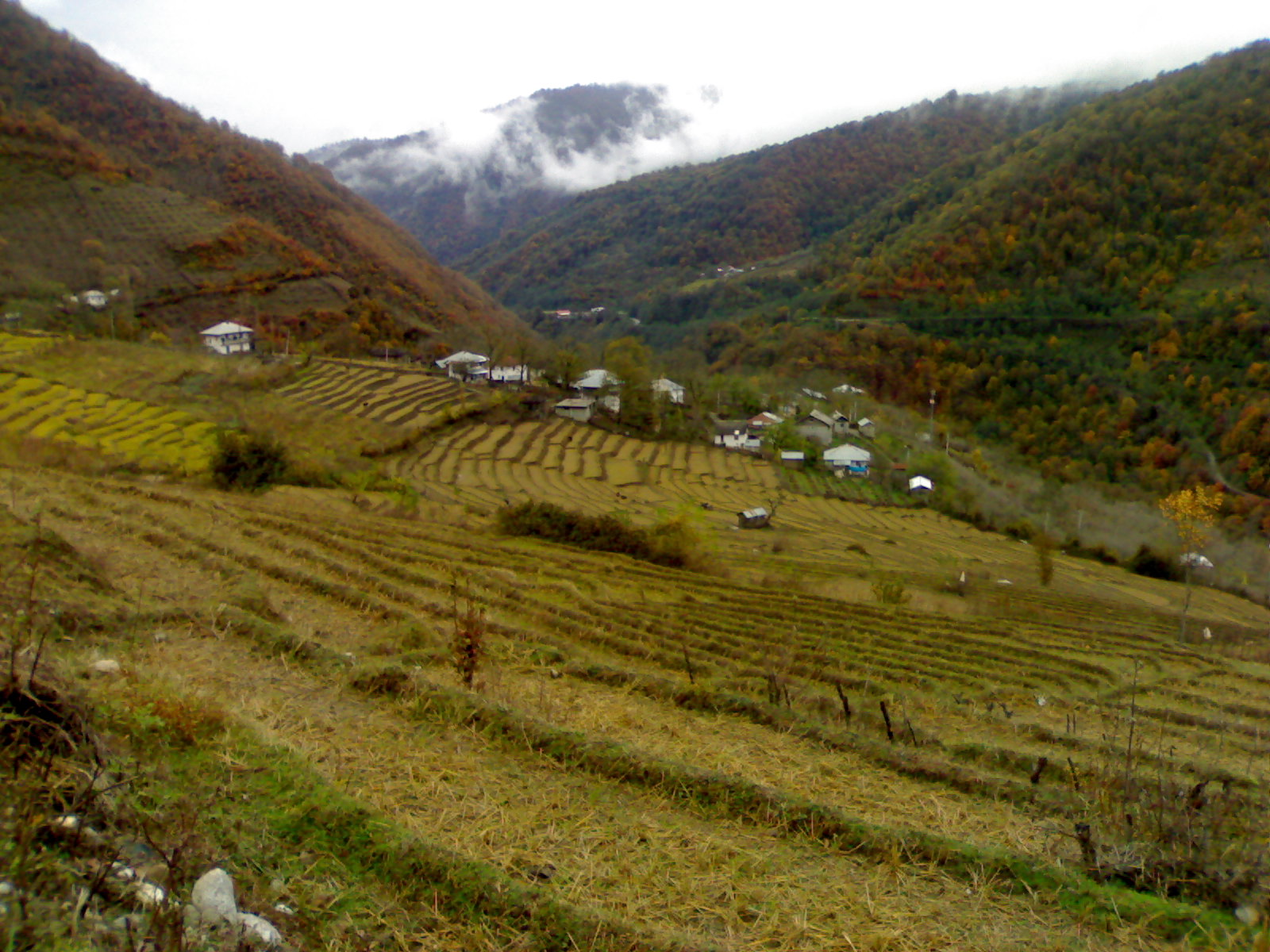
- Polam in 2007

- Location within Iran
- Coordinates: 36°55′14″N 50°14′34″E
- Country: Iran
- Province: Gilan
- County: Rudsar
- Bakhsh: Rahimabad
- Rural District: Rahimabad

Population (2016)
  - Total: 298
- Time zone: UTC+3:30 (IRST)

Polam (Persian: پلام, also Romanized as Polām; also known as Polām-e Bālā) is a village in Rahimabad Rural District, Rahimabad District, Rudsar County, Gilan Province, Iran. In 2006, its population was 341 in 85 families. In 2016, its population was 298, in 101 households.
