= Pir Mahalleh =

Pir Mahalleh پيرمحله
- Village
- Location within Iran
- Coordinates: 37°03′53″N 50°19′34″E
- Country: Iran
- Province: Gilan
- County: Rudsar
- Bakhsh: Central
- Rural District: Reza Mahalleh

Population (2006)
  - Total: 142
- Time zone: UTC+3:30 (IRST)
  - Summer (DST): UTC+4:30 (IRDT)

Pir Mahalleh (Persian: پيرمحله, also Romanized as Pīr Maḩalleh) is a village in Reza Mahalleh Rural District, in the Central District of Rudsar County, Gilan Province, Iran. At the 2006 census, its population was 142, in 48 families.
