= Rud Mianeh =

Rud Mianeh رودميانه
- Village
- Location within Iran
- Coordinates: 37°03′09″N 50°19′26″E
- Country: Iran
- Province: Gilan
- County: Rudsar
- Bakhsh: Kelachay
- Rural District: Machian

Population (2006)
  - Total: 151
- Time zone: UTC+3:30 (IRST)
  - Summer (DST): UTC+4:30 (IRDT)

Rud Mianeh (Persian: رودميانه, also Romanized as Rūd Mīāneh) is a village in Machian Rural District, Kelachay District, Rudsar County, Gilan Province, Iran. At the 2006 census, its population was 151, in 49 families.
