= Jowr Mahalleh =

Jowr Mahalleh جورمحله
- Village
- Location within Iran
- Coordinates: 37°00′32″N 50°26′05″E
- Country: Iran
- Province: Gilan
- County: Rudsar
- Bakhsh: Chaboksar
- Rural District: Siahkalrud

Population (2006)
  - Total: 159
- Time zone: UTC+3:30 (IRST)
  - Summer (DST): UTC+4:30 (IRDT)

Jowr Mahalleh (Persian: جورمحله, also Romanized as Jowr Maḩalleh) is a village in Siahkalrud Rural District, Chaboksar District, Rudsar County, Gilan Province, Iran. At the 2006 census, its population was 159, in 44 families.
