= Mozhdeh =

Mozhdeh or Mozhdah (Persian: مژده; "good news") is a girl's name in Iran. Notable people with the name include:

- Mozhdah Jamalzadah (born 1982), Afghan singer, actress, and talk show host
