= Rejah Sara =

Rejah Sara رجه سرا
- Village
- Location within Iran
- Coordinates: 36°50′01″N 50°10′41″E
- Country: Iran
- Province: Gilan
- County: Rudsar
- Bakhsh: Rahimabad
- Rural District: Rahimabad

Population (2006)
  - Total: 100
- Time zone: UTC+3:30 (IRST)
  - Summer (DST): UTC+4:30 (IRDT)

Rejah Sara (Persian: رجه سرا, also Romanized as Rejah Sarā; also known as Rejā Sar) is a village in Rahimabad Rural District, Rahimabad District, Rudsar County, Gilan Province, Iran. At the 2006 census, its population was 100, in 24 families.
