= Qazi Chak =

Qazi Chak قاضي چاك
- Village
- Location within Iran
- Coordinates: 36°45′50″N 50°20′19″E
- Country: Iran
- Province: Gilan
- County: Rudsar
- Bakhsh: Rahimabad
- Rural District: Siyarastaq Yeylaq

Population (2006)
  - Total: 64
- Time zone: UTC+3:30 (IRST)
  - Summer (DST): UTC+4:30 (IRDT)

Qazi Chak (Persian: قاضي چاك, also Romanized as Qāẕī Chāk) is a village in Siyarastaq Yeylaq Rural District, Rahimabad District, Rudsar County, Gilan Province, Iran. At the 2006 census, its population was 64, in 27 families.
