= Mazi Gavabar =

Mazi Gavabar مازي گوابر
- Village
- Country: Iran
- Province: Gilan
- County: Rudsar
- Bakhsh: Rahimabad
- Rural District: Rahimabad

Population (2006)
  - Total: 43
- Time zone: UTC+3:30 (IRST)
  - Summer (DST): UTC+4:30 (IRDT)

Mazi Gavabar (Persian: مازي گوابر, also Romanized as Māzī Gavābar) is a village in Rahimabad Rural District, Rahimabad District, Rudsar County, Gilan Province, Iran. At the 2006 census, its population was 43, in 11 families.
