= Hadi Gavaber =

Hadi Gavaber هادي گوابر
- Village
- Location within Iran
- Coordinates: 37°01′50″N 50°16′34″E
- Country: Iran
- Province: Gilan
- County: Rudsar
- Bakhsh: Kelachay
- Rural District: Machian

Population (2006)
  - Total: 153
- Time zone: UTC+3:30 (IRST)
  - Summer (DST): UTC+4:30 (IRDT)

Hadi Gavaber (Persian: هادي گوابر, also Romanized as Hādī Gavāber; also known as Hādī Gavāpar) is a village in Machian Rural District, Kelachay District, Rudsar County, Gilan Province, Iran. At the 2006 census, its population was 153, in 38 families.
