= Div Darreh =

Div Darreh ديودره
- Village
- Location within Iran
- Coordinates: 37°06′56″N 50°15′57″E
- Country: Iran
- Province: Gilan
- County: Rudsar
- Bakhsh: Central
- Rural District: Chini Jan

Population (2006)
  - Total: 213
- Time zone: UTC+3:30 (IRST)
  - Summer (DST): UTC+4:30 (IRDT)

Div Darreh (Persian: ديودره, also Romanized as Dīv Darreh) is a village in Chini Jan Rural District, in the Central District of Rudsar County, Gilan Province, Iran. At the 2006 census, its population was 213, in 68 families.
