= Siah Keshan =

Siah Keshan سياه كشان
- Village
- Location within Iran
- Coordinates: 36°54′27″N 50°14′09″E
- Country: Iran
- Province: Gilan
- County: Rudsar
- Bakhsh: Rahimabad
- Rural District: Eshkevar-e Sofla

Population (2006)
  - Total: 18
- Time zone: UTC+3:30 (IRST)
  - Summer (DST): UTC+4:30 (IRDT)

Siah Keshan (Persian: سياه كشان, also Romanized as Sīāh Keshān) is a village in Eshkevar-e Sofla Rural District, Rahimabad District, Rudsar County, Gilan Province, Iran. At the 2006 census, its population was 18, in 6 families.
