= Tabtus =

Tabtus تب طوس
- Village
- Location within Iran
- Coordinates: 36°57′23″N 50°19′23″E
- Country: Iran
- Province: Gilan
- County: Rudsar
- Bakhsh: Rahimabad
- Rural District: Rahimabad

Population (2006)
  - Total: 39
- Time zone: UTC+3:30 (IRST)
  - Summer (DST): UTC+4:30 (IRDT)

Tabtus (Persian: تب طوس, also Romanized as Tabţūs; also known as Tapţūs) is a village in Rahimabad Rural District, Rahimabad District, Rudsar County, Gilan Province, Iran. At the 2006 census, its population was 39, in 11 families.
