= Lasbu Mahalleh =

Lasbu Mahalleh لسبومحله
- Village
- Location within Iran
- Coordinates: 37°05′26″N 50°19′08″E
- Country: Iran
- Province: Gilan
- County: Rudsar
- Bakhsh: Central
- Rural District: Reza Mahalleh

Population (2006)
  - Total: 256
- Time zone: UTC+3:30 (IRST)
  - Summer (DST): UTC+4:30 (IRDT)

Lasbu Mahalleh (Persian: لسبومحله, also Romanized as Lasbū Maḩalleh) is a village in Reza Mahalleh Rural District, in the Central District of Rudsar County, Gilan Province, Iran. At the 2006 census, its population was 256, in 77 families.
