= Nahar-e Khurlat =

Nahar-e Khurlat نهارخورلات
- Village
- Location within Iran
- Coordinates: 36°57′00″N 50°26′00″E
- Country: Iran
- Province: Gilan
- County: Rudsar
- Bakhsh: Chaboksar
- Rural District: Siahkalrud

Population (2006)
  - Total: 22
- Time zone: UTC+3:30 (IRST)
  - Summer (DST): UTC+4:30 (IRDT)

Nahar-e Khurlat (Persian: نهارخورلات, also Romanized as Nahār-e Khūrlāt) is a village in Siahkalrud Rural District, Chaboksar District, Rudsar County, Gilan Province, Iran. At the 2006 census, its population was 22, in 6 families.
