= Allah Rud =

Allah Rud لـله‌رود
- Village
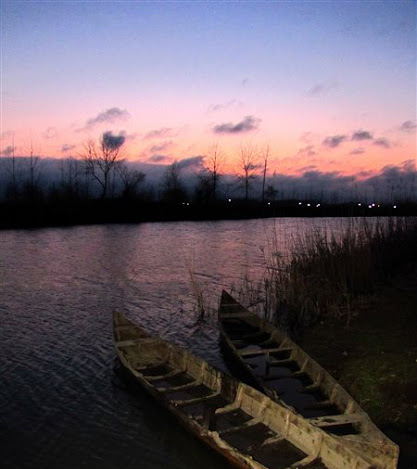

- Location within Iran
- Coordinates: 37°12′05″N 50°16′06″E
- Country: Iran
- Province: Gilan
- County: Rudsar
- Bakhsh: Central
- Rural District: Chini Jan

Population (2016)
  - Total: 202
- Time zone: UTC+3:30 (IRST)

Allah Rud (Persian: لـله‌رود, also Romanized as Allah Rūd; also known as Lalehrūd and Lelārūd) is a village in Chini Jan Rural District, in the Central District of Rudsar County, Gilan Province, Iran. At the 2016 census, its population was 202, in 69 families.
