= Miran Mahalleh =

Miran Mahalleh ميران محله
- Village
- Location within Iran
- Coordinates: 37°06′41″N 50°19′37″E
- Country: Iran
- Province: Gilan
- County: Rudsar
- Bakhsh: Kelachay
- Rural District: Machian

Population (2006)
  - Total: 57
- Time zone: UTC+3:30 (IRST)
  - Summer (DST): UTC+4:30 (IRDT)

Miran Mahalleh (Persian: ميران محله, also Romanized as Mīrān Maḩalleh) is a village in Machian Rural District, Kelachay District, Rudsar County, Gilan Province, Iran. At the 2006 census, its population was 57, in 17 families.
