= Sorkh Taleh =

Sorkh Taleh سرخ تله
- Village
- Location within Iran
- Coordinates: 36°45′18″N 50°08′12″E
- Country: Iran
- Province: Gilan
- County: Rudsar
- Bakhsh: Rahimabad
- Rural District: Shuil

Population (2006)
  - Total: 30
- Time zone: UTC+3:30 (IRST)
  - Summer (DST): UTC+4:30 (IRDT)

Sorkh Taleh (Persian: سرخ تله) is a village in Shuil Rural District, Rahimabad District, Rudsar County, Gilan Province, Iran. At the 2006 census, its population was 30, in 11 families.
