= Mowmen Zamin =

Mowmen Zamin مومن زمين
- Village
- Location within Iran
- Coordinates: 36°45′10″N 50°14′47″E
- Country: Iran
- Province: Gilan
- County: Rudsar
- Bakhsh: Rahimabad
- Rural District: Shuil

Population (2006)
  - Total: 37
- Time zone: UTC+3:30 (IRST)
  - Summer (DST): UTC+4:30 (IRDT)

Mowmen Zamin (Persian: مومن زمين, also Romanized as Mow‘men Zamīn; also known as Mo’men Zamīn, Moomazi, Mūmazī, and Mumiza) is a village in Shuil Rural District, Rahimabad District, Rudsar County, Gilan Province, Iran. At the 2006 census, its population was 37, in 15 families.
