= Limeh Sara =

Limeh Sara ليمه سرا
- Village
- Location within Iran
- Coordinates: 36°56′47″N 50°32′31″E
- Country: Iran
- Province: Gilan
- County: Rudsar
- Bakhsh: Chaboksar
- Rural District: Owshiyan

Population (2006)
  - Total: 136
- Time zone: UTC+3:30 (IRST)
  - Summer (DST): UTC+4:30 (IRDT)

Limeh Sara (Persian: ليمه سرا, also Romanized as Līmeh Sarā) is a village in Owshiyan Rural District, Chaboksar District, Rudsar County, Gilan Province, Iran. At the 2006 census, its population was 136, in 39 families.
