= Mazu Darreh =

Mazu Darreh مازودره
- Village
- Location within Iran
- Coordinates: 36°49′49″N 50°13′31″E
- Country: Iran
- Province: Gilan
- County: Rudsar
- Bakhsh: Rahimabad
- Rural District: Shuil

Population (2006)
  - Total: 42
- Time zone: UTC+3:30 (IRST)
  - Summer (DST): UTC+4:30 (IRDT)

Mazu Darreh (Persian: مازودره, also Romanized as Māzū Darreh) is a village in Shuil Rural District, Rahimabad District, Rudsar County, Gilan Province, Iran. At the 2006 census, its population was 42, in 13 families.
