= Shadraj-e Olya =

Shadraj-e Olya شادراج عليا
- Village
- Location within Iran
- Coordinates: 36°45′35″N 50°19′24″E
- Country: Iran
- Province: Gilan
- County: Rudsar
- Bakhsh: Rahimabad
- Rural District: Siyarastaq Yeylaq

Population (2006)
  - Total: 25
- Time zone: UTC+3:30 (IRST)
  - Summer (DST): UTC+4:30 (IRDT)

Shadraj-e Olya (Persian: شادراج عليا, also Romanized as Shādrāj-e ‘Olyā; also known as Shāhrāj) is a village in Siyarastaq Yeylaq Rural District, Rahimabad District, Rudsar County, Gilan Province, Iran. At the 2006 census, its population was 25, in 10 families.
