= Shir Ali Beyk Mahalleh =

Shir Ali Beyk Mahalleh شيرعلي بيك محله
- Village
- Location within Iran
- Coordinates: 37°02′30″N 50°18′17″E
- Country: Iran
- Province: Gilan
- County: Rudsar
- Bakhsh: Kelachay
- Rural District: Machian

Population (2006)
  - Total: 40
- Time zone: UTC+3:30 (IRST)
  - Summer (DST): UTC+4:30 (IRDT)

Shir Ali Beyk Mahalleh (Persian: شيرعلي بيك محله, also Romanized as Shīr ‘Alī Beyk Maḩalleh) is a village in Machian Rural District, Kelachay District, Rudsar County, Gilan Province, Iran. At the 2006 census, its population was 40, in 13 families.
