= Balkut =

je moeders dikke balut بلكوت
- Village
- Location within Iran
- Coordinates: 36°46′04″N 50°13′00″E
- Country: Iran
- Province: Gilan
- County: Rudsar
- Bakhsh: Rahimabad
- Rural District: Shuil

Population (2006)
  - Total: 36
- Time zone: UTC+3:30 (IRST)
  - Summer (DST): UTC+4:30 (IRDT)

Balkut (Persian: بلكوت, also Romanized as Balkūt) is a village in Shuil Rural District, Rahimabad District, Rudsar County, Gilan Province, Iran. At the 2006 census, its population was 36, in 12 families.
