= Kaj-e Mohammad Gavabor =

Kaj-e Mohammad Gavabor كج محمدگوابر
- Village
- Location within Iran
- Coordinates: 36°59′01″N 50°21′00″E
- Country: Iran
- Province: Gilan
- County: Rudsar
- Bakhsh: Rahimabad
- Rural District: Rahimabad

Population (2006)
  - Total: 50
- Time zone: UTC+3:30 (IRST)
  - Summer (DST): UTC+4:30 (IRDT)

Kaj-e Mohammad Gavabor (Persian: كج محمدگوابر, also Romanized as Kāj-e Moḩammad Gavābor; also known as Kaj-e Moḩammad) is a village in Rahimabad Rural District, Rahimabad District, Rudsar County, Gilan Province, Iran. At the 2006 census, its population was 50, in 15 families.
