= Jow Poshtan =

Village in Gilan, Iran

Jow Poshtan جوپشتان
- Village
- Location within Iran
- Coordinates: 37°07′28″N 50°17′12″E
- Country: Iran
- Province: Gilan
- County: Rudsar
- Bakhsh: Central
- Rural District: Reza Mahalleh

Population (2006)
  - Total: 157
- Time zone: UTC+3:30 (IRST)
  - Summer (DST): UTC+4:30 (IRDT)

Jow Poshtan (Persian: جوپشتان, also Romanized as Jow Poshtān) is a village in Reza Mahalleh Rural District, in the Central District of Rudsar County, Gilan Province, Iran. As of the 2006 census, its population was 157, in 44 families.
