= Soleyman Chapar =

Soleyman Chapar سليمان چپر
- Village
- Location within Iran
- Coordinates: 36°48′38″N 50°17′18″E
- Country: Iran
- Province: Gilan
- County: Rudsar
- Bakhsh: Rahimabad
- Rural District: Eshkevar-e Sofla

Population (2006)
  - Total: 34
- Time zone: UTC+3:30 (IRST)
  - Summer (DST): UTC+4:30 (IRDT)

Soleyman Chapar (Persian: سليمان چپر, also Romanized as Soleymān Chapar; also known as Soleymān Chūr) is a village in Eshkevar-e Sofla Rural District, Rahimabad District, Rudsar County, Gilan Province, Iran. At the 2006 census, its population was 34, in 9 families.
