= Siah Lat =

Siah Lat سياه لات
- Village
- Location within Iran
- Coordinates: 37°01′21″N 50°17′24″E
- Country: Iran
- Province: Gilan
- County: Rudsar
- Bakhsh: Kelachay
- Rural District: Machian

Population (2006)
  - Total: 171
- Time zone: UTC+3:30 (IRST)
  - Summer (DST): UTC+4:30 (IRDT)

Siah Lat (Persian: سياه لات, also Romanized as Sīāh Lāt) is a village in Machian Rural District, Kelachay District, Rudsar County, Gilan Province, Iran. At the 2006 census, its population was 171, in 43 families.
