= Arbeh Langeh =

Arbeh Langeh اربه لنگه
- Village
- Location within Iran
- Coordinates: 37°01′40″N 50°17′34″E
- Country: Iran
- Province: Gilan
- County: Rudsar
- Bakhsh: Kelachay
- Rural District: Machian

Population (2006)
  - Total: 132
- Time zone: UTC+3:30 (IRST)
  - Summer (DST): UTC+4:30 (IRDT)

Arbeh Langeh (Persian: اربه لنگه, also Romanized as Arbā Langeh) is a village in Machian Rural District, Kelachay District, Rudsar County, Gilan Province, Iran. At the 2006 census, its population was 132, in 33 families.
