= Deraz Lat-e Bala =

Deraz Lat-e Bala درازلات بالا
- Village
- Location within Iran
- Coordinates: 36°58′19″N 50°16′48″E
- Country: Iran
- Province: Gilan
- County: Rudsar
- Bakhsh: Rahimabad
- Rural District: Rahimabad

Population (2006)
  - Total: 161
- Time zone: UTC+3:30 (IRST)
  - Summer (DST): UTC+4:30 (IRDT)

Deraz Lat-e Bala (Persian: درازلات بالا, also Romanized as Derāz Lāt-e Bālā; also known as Derāz Lāt) is a village in Rahimabad Rural District, Rahimabad District, Rudsar County, Gilan Province, Iran. At the 2006 census, its population was 161, in 37 families.
