= Darugar Mahalleh =

Darugar Mahalleh داروگرمحله
- Village
- Interactive map of Darugar Mahalleh
- Coordinates: 37°06′23.69″N 50°20′44.06″E
- Country: Iran
- Province: Gilan
- County: Rudsar
- Bakhsh: Central
- Rural District: Reza Mahalleh

Population (2016)
  - Total: 229
- Time zone: UTC+3:30 (IRST)

Darugar Mahalleh (Persian: داروگرمحله, also Romanized as Dārūgar Maḩalleh) is a village in Reza Mahalleh Rural District, in the Central District of Rudsar County, Gilan Province, Iran. At the 2016 census, its population was 229, in 79 families. Up from 197 people in 2006.
