= Khanollah =

Khanollah خان اله
- Village
- Location within Iran
- Coordinates: 36°56′00″N 50°27′00″E
- Country: Iran
- Province: Gilan
- County: Rudsar
- Bakhsh: Chaboksar
- Rural District: Siahkalrud

Population (2006)
  - Total: 75
- Time zone: UTC+3:30 (IRST)
  - Summer (DST): UTC+4:30 (IRDT)

Khanollah (Persian: خان اله, also Romanized as Khānollāh) is a village in Siahkalrud Rural District, Chaboksar District, Rudsar County, Gilan Province, Iran. At the 2006 census, its population was 75, in 21 families.
