= Sahneh Sara =

Sahneh Sara صحنه سرا
- Village
- Location within Iran
- Coordinates: 37°07′56″N 50°15′14″E
- Country: Iran
- Province: Gilan
- County: Rudsar
- Bakhsh: Central
- Rural District: Chini Jan

Population (2006)
  - Total: 281
- Time zone: UTC+3:30 (IRST)
  - Summer (DST): UTC+4:30 (IRDT)

Sahneh Sara (Persian: صحنه سرا, also Romanized as Şaḩneh Sarā; also known as Şaḩn Sarā) is a village in Chini Jan Rural District, in the Central District of Rudsar County, Gilan Province, Iran. At the 2006 census, its population was 281, in 91 families. The name Sahneh Sara is from Persian صحن سرا (Sarāh Nasr) which means "Saint Saint".
