= Halu Bon Darreh =

Halu Bon Darreh هلوبن دره
- Village
- Location within Iran
- Coordinates: 36°52′07″N 50°09′15″E
- Country: Iran
- Province: Gilan
- County: Rudsar
- Bakhsh: Rahimabad
- Rural District: Eshkevar-e Sofla

Population (2006)
  - Total: 136
- Time zone: UTC+3:30 (IRST)
  - Summer (DST): UTC+4:30 (IRDT)

Halu Bon Darreh (Persian: هلوبن دره, also Romanized as Halū Bon Darreh) is a village in Eshkevar-e Sofla Rural District, Rahimabad District, Rudsar County, Gilan Province, Iran. At the 2006 census, its population was 136, in 37 families.
