= Gusfand Guyeh =

Gusfand Guyeh گوسفندگويه
- Village
- Location within Iran
- Coordinates: 36°57′47″N 50°18′21″E
- Country: Iran
- Province: Gilan
- County: Rudsar
- Bakhsh: Rahimabad
- Rural District: Rahimabad

Population (2006)
  - Total: 74
- Time zone: UTC+3:30 (IRST)
  - Summer (DST): UTC+4:30 (IRDT)

Gusfand Guyeh (Persian: گوسفندگويه, also Romanized as Gūsfand Gūyeh) is a village in Rahimabad Rural District, Rahimabad District, Rudsar County, Gilan Province, Iran. At the 2006 census, its population was 74, in 17 families.
