= Sara Gavabar =

Sara Gavabar سراگوابر
- Village
- Location within Iran
- Coordinates: 37°00′21″N 50°27′43″E
- Country: Iran
- Province: Gilan
- County: Rudsar
- Bakhsh: Chaboksar
- Rural District: Siahkalrud

Population (2006)
  - Total: 61
- Time zone: UTC+3:30 (IRST)
  - Summer (DST): UTC+4:30 (IRDT)

Sara Gavabar (Persian: سراگوابر, also Romanized as Sarā Gavābar) is a village in Siahkalrud Rural District, Chaboksar District, Rudsar County, Gilan Province, Iran. At the 2006 census, its population was 61, in 19 families.
