= Lih Kolam =

Lih Kolam ليه كلام
- Village
- Location within Iran
- Coordinates: 36°57′08″N 50°32′22″E
- Country: Iran
- Province: Gilan
- County: Rudsar
- Bakhsh: Chaboksar
- Rural District: Owshiyan

Population (2006)
  - Total: 216
- Time zone: UTC+3:30 (IRST)
  - Summer (DST): UTC+4:30 (IRDT)

Lih Kolam (Persian: ليه كلام, also Romanized as Līh Kolām; also known as Likolom) is a village in Owshiyan Rural District, Chaboksar District, Rudsar County, Gilan Province, Iran. At the 2006 census, its population was 216, in 58 families.
