= Lerudbon =

Lerudbon لرودبن
- Village
- Location within Iran
- Coordinates: 36°58′07″N 50°17′29″E
- Country: Iran
- Province: Gilan
- County: Rudsar
- Bakhsh: Rahimabad
- Rural District: Rahimabad

Population (2006)
  - Total: 85
- Time zone: UTC+3:30 (IRST)
  - Summer (DST): UTC+4:30 (IRDT)

Lerudbon (Persian: لرودبن, also romanized as Lerūdbon; also known as Lerdbon) is a village in Rahimabad Rural District, Rahimabad District, Rudsar County, Gilan Province, Iran. At the 2006 census, its population was 85, in 20 families.
