= Peram Kuh =

Peram Kuh پرامكوه
- Village
- Location within Iran
- Coordinates: 36°50′29″N 50°09′43″E
- Country: Iran
- Province: Gilan
- County: Rudsar
- Bakhsh: Rahimabad
- Rural District: Eshkevar-e Sofla

Population (2006)
  - Total: 10
- Time zone: UTC+3:30 (IRST)
  - Summer (DST): UTC+4:30 (IRDT)

Peram Kuh (Persian: پرامكوه, also Romanized as Perām Kūh; also known as Perm Kūh) is a village in Eshkevar-e Sofla Rural District, Rahimabad District, Rudsar County, Gilan Province, Iran. At the 2006 census, its population was 10, in 7 families.
