= Pain Derazlat =

Pain Derazlat پائين درازلات
- Village
- Location within Iran
- Coordinates: 36°57′48″N 50°17′14″E
- Country: Iran
- Province: Gilan
- County: Rudsar
- Bakhsh: Rahimabad
- Rural District: Rahimabad

Population (2006)
  - Total: 53
- Time zone: UTC+3:30 (IRST)
  - Summer (DST): UTC+4:30 (IRDT)

Pain Derazlat (Persian: پائين درازلات, also Romanized as Pā’īn Derāzlāt; also known as Derāz Lāt) is a village in Rahimabad Rural District, Rahimabad District, Rudsar County, Gilan Province, Iran. At the 2006 census, its population was 53, in 8 families.
