= Tukamjan =

Tukamjan توكامجان
- Village
- Location within Iran
- Coordinates: 36°43′56″N 50°23′44″E
- Country: Iran
- Province: Gilan
- County: Rudsar
- Bakhsh: Rahimabad
- Rural District: Siyarastaq Yeylaq

Population (2006)
  - Total: 27
- Time zone: UTC+3:30 (IRST)
  - Summer (DST): UTC+4:30 (IRDT)

Tukamjan (Persian: توكامجان, also Romanized as Tūkāmjān; also known as Takām Chān and Takāmjān) is a village in Siyarastaq Yeylaq Rural District, Rahimabad District, Rudsar County, Gilan Province, Iran. At the 2006 census, its population was 27, in 13 families.
