= Kiasaj Mahalleh =

Kiasejmahaleh كياسج محله
- village
- Location within Iran
- Coordinates: 37°03′04″N 50°19′21″E
- Country: Iran
- Province: Gilan
- County: Rudsar
- Bakhsh: Kelachay
- Rural District: Machian

Population (2017)
  - Total: 108
- Time zone: UTC+3:30 (IRST)
  - Summer (DST): UTC+4:30 (IRDT)

Kiasejmahaleh (Persian: كياسج محله, also Romanized as Kīāsejmaḩaleh) is a village in Machian Rural District, Kelachay District, Rudsar County, Gilan Province, Iran. At the 2017 census, its population was 108, in 37 families.
