= Merseh =

Merseh مرسه
- Village
- Location within Iran
- Coordinates: 37°00′23″N 50°25′48″E
- Country: Iran
- Province: Gilan
- County: Rudsar
- Bakhsh: Chaboksar
- Rural District: Siahkalrud

Population (2006)
  - Total: 289
- Time zone: UTC+3:30 (IRST)
  - Summer (DST): UTC+4:30 (IRDT)

Merseh (Persian: مرسه; also known as Merseh-ye Pā’īn) is a village in Siahkalrud Rural District, Chaboksar District, Rudsar County, Gilan Province, Iran. At the 2006 census, its population was 289, in 96 families.
