= Boz Kuyeh =

Boz Kuyeh بزكويه
- Village
- Location within Iran
- Coordinates: 36°59′36″N 50°23′47″E
- Country: Iran
- Province: Gilan
- County: Rudsar
- Bakhsh: Kelachay
- Rural District: Bibalan

Population (2006)
  - Total: 98
- Time zone: UTC+3:30 (IRST)
  - Summer (DST): UTC+4:30 (IRDT)

Boz Kuyeh (Persian: بزكويه, also Romanized as Boz Kūyeh) is a village in Bibalan Rural District, Kelachay District, Rudsar County, Gilan Province, Iran. At the 2006 census, its population was 98, in 36 families.
