= Kand Sar =

Kand Sar or Kandsar (Persian: كندسر) may refer to various places in Iran:

- Kandsar, Langarud, Gilan Province
- Kandsar-e Shekar Kesh, Langarud County, Gilan Province
- Kandsar-e Zeyn Pareh, Langarud County, Gilan Province
- Kand Sar, Chaboksar, Rudsar County, Gilan Province
- Kandsar, Kelachay, Rudsar County, Gilan Province
- Kandsar-e Bibalan, Rudsar County, Gilan Province
- Kand Sar, Mazandaran
