= Febil Gav Sara =

Febil Gav Sara فبيل گاوسرا
- Village
- Country: Iran
- Province: Gilan
- County: Langarud
- Bakhsh: Otaqvar
- Rural District: Otaqvar

Population (2006)
  - Total: 34
- Time zone: UTC+3:30 (IRST)
  - Summer (DST): UTC+4:30 (IRDT)

Febil Gav Sara (Persian: فبيل گاوسرا, also Romanized as Febīl Gāv Sarā) is a village in Otaqvar Rural District, Otaqvar District, Langarud County, Gilan Province, Iran. At the 2006 census, its population was 34, in 8 families.
