= Bolur Dokan =

Village in Gilan province, Iran

Bolur Dokan Persian: بلوردکان
- Village
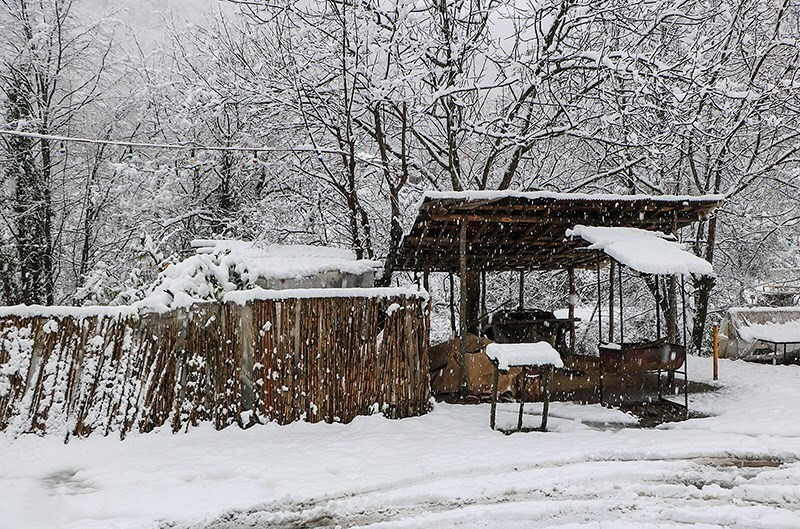
- Snow in Bolur Dokan

- Location within Iran
- Coordinates: 37°01′20″N 50°03′51″E
- Country: Iran
- Province: Gilan
- County: Langarud
- District: Otaqvar
- Rural District: Lat Leyl

Population (2016)
  - Total: 144
- Time zone: UTC+3:30 (IRST)

Bolur Dokan (Persian: بلوردكان) (Note: Also romanized as Bolūr Dokān and Bolurdkān; also known as Balār Dokān) is a village and touristic region in Lat Leyl Rural District of Otaqvar District in Langarud County, Gilan province, Iran, 12 km (7.5 mi) south of the city of Amlash.

== History ==
In Bolur Dokan, the remains of a brick bridge can be seen near the new iron bridge, which was built right at the point where the two rivers "Siah Rud" and "Zil Bare" join. This road is actually the same old road that was built during the Safavid era and passed through the city of Amlash to reach Ismail Abad in Qazvin. This paved road was known as Shah Abbasi Road, and near the brick bridge, there are also the remains of an abandoned caravanserai that dates back to the time of Shah Abbas.

== Demographics ==
=== Population ===
Bolur Dokan was formerly in Rudsar County, part of Amlash Rural District. In the 1966 National Census, it had only 10 people in 2 households. In 1976, its population increased to 59 people in 8 households. It had a cafe, and an elementary school, but no water or power infrastructure.

According to the 1986 census, Bolur Dokan's main agricultural activities were animal husbandry and gardening. Its population at that time was 111 people in 19 households.

At the time of the 2006 census, the village's population was 158 in 42 households. The following census in 2011 counted 158 people in 44 households. The 2016 census measured the population of the village as 144 people in 50 households.

Bolur Dokan Population history
| Year | Pop. | ±% |
|---|---|---|
| 1966 | 10 | — |
| 1976 | 59 | +490.0% |
| 1986 | 111 | +88.1% |
| 2006 | 158 | +42.3% |
| 2011 | 158 | +0.0% |
| 2016 | 144 | −8.9% |

== Tourism ==
Bolur Dokan's old bridge and the nearby waterfalls are among the main attractions of the area and provide suitable places for hiking and photography. The area also includes caves such as Damaneh cave. Climbing peaks and exploring mountain trails are also popular activities in this area.
