= Atarud =

Atarud اترود
- Village
- Location within Iran
- Coordinates: 37°05′18″N 50°03′23″E
- Country: Iran
- Province: Gilan
- County: Langarud
- Bakhsh: Otaqvar
- Rural District: Otaqvar

Population (2006)
  - Total: 129
- Time zone: UTC+3:30 (IRST)
  - Summer (DST): UTC+4:30 (IRDT)

Atarud (Persian: اترود, also Romanized as Ātarūd) is a village in Otaqvar Rural District, Otaqvar District, Langarud County, Gilan Province, Iran. At the 2006 census, its population was 129, in 28 families.
