= Tash Kola =

Tash Kola تاشكلا
- Village
- Location within Iran
- Coordinates: 36°56′31″N 50°10′19″E
- Country: Iran
- Province: Gilan
- County: Langarud
- Bakhsh: Otaqvar
- Rural District: Lat Leyl

Population (2006)
  - Total: 40
- Time zone: UTC+3:30 (IRST)
  - Summer (DST): UTC+4:30 (IRDT)

Tash Kola (Persian: تاشكلا, also Romanized as Tāsh Kolā; also known as Tāshkaleh and Tāsh Kalleh) is a village in Lat Leyl Rural District, Otaqvar District, Langarud County, Gilan Province, Iran. At the 2006 census, its population was 40, in 11 families.
