= Khortay =

Khortay خرطاي
- Village
- Location within Iran
- Coordinates: 37°07′19″N 50°00′18″E
- Country: Iran
- Province: Gilan
- County: Langarud
- Bakhsh: Otaqvar
- Rural District: Otaqvar

Population (2006)
  - Total: 51
- Time zone: UTC+3:30 (IRST)
  - Summer (DST): UTC+4:30 (IRDT)

Khortay (Persian: خرطاي, also Romanized as Khorţāy; also known as Khūrtāy) is a village in Otaqvar Rural District, Otaqvar District, Langarud County, Gilan Province, Iran. At the 2006 census, its population was 51, in 14 families.
