= Ashkal =

Ashkal اشكال
- Village
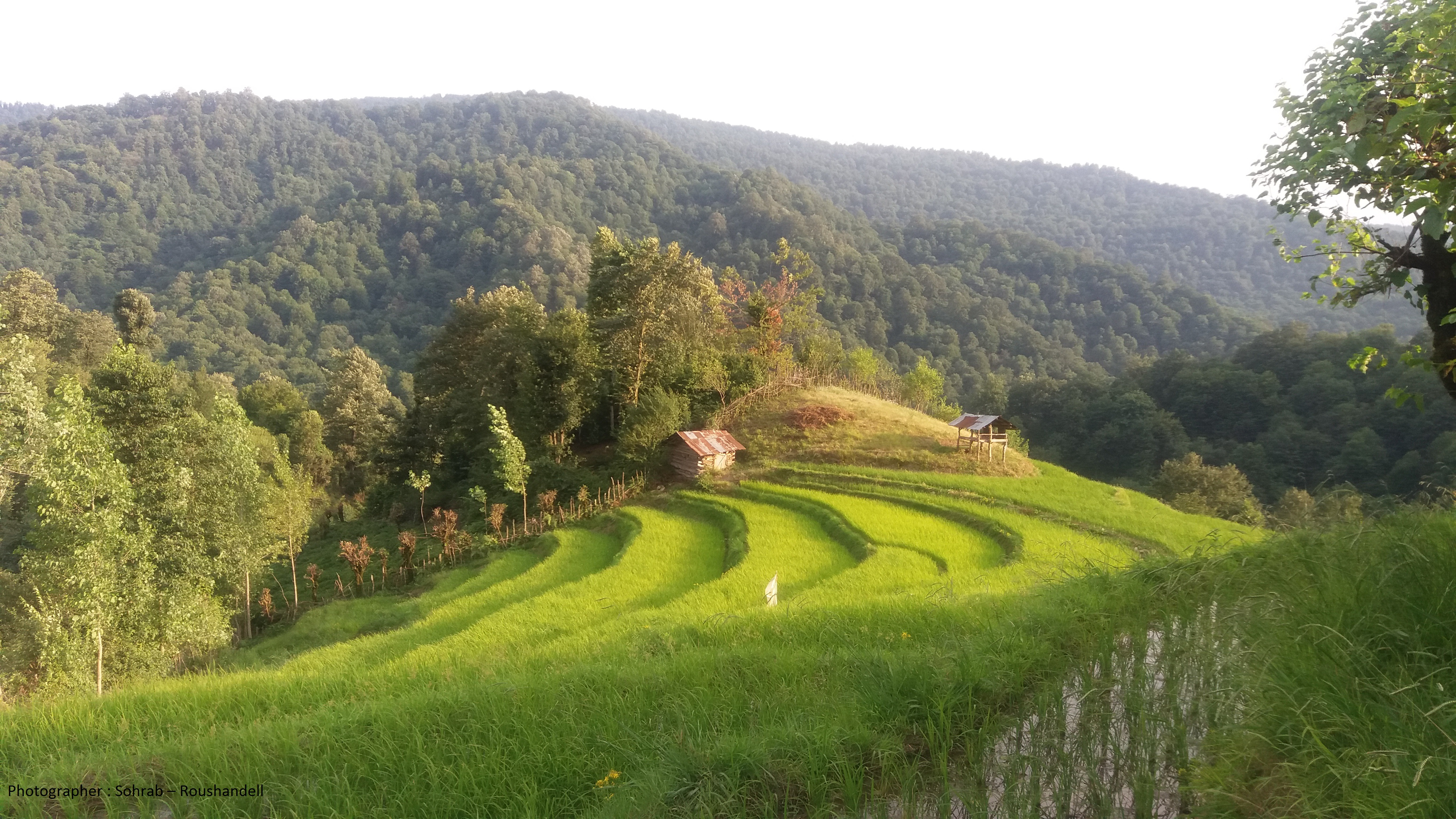

- Location within Iran
- Coordinates: 37°05′02″N 49°59′02″E
- Country: Iran
- Province: Gilan
- County: Langarud
- Bakhsh: Otaqvar
- Rural District: Otaqvar

Population (2016)
  - Total: 67
- Time zone: UTC+3:30 (IRST)

Ashkal (Persian: اشكال, also romanized as Ashkāl; also known as Ashkālī) is a village in Otaqvar Rural District, Otaqvar District, Langarud County, Gilan Province, Iran. At the 2006 census its population was 67, in 22 families; it was 79 in 2006.
