= Kahlebun =

Kahlebun كهلبون
- Village
- Location within Iran
- Coordinates: 37°05′06″N 50°04′55″E
- Country: Iran
- Province: Gilan
- County: Langarud
- Bakhsh: Otaqvar
- Rural District: Otaqvar

Population (2006)
  - Total: 70
- Time zone: UTC+3:30 (IRST)
  - Summer (DST): UTC+4:30 (IRDT)

Kahlebun (Persian: كهلبون, also Romanized as Kahlebūn) is a village in Otaqvar Rural District, Otaqvar District, Langarud County, Gilan Province, Iran. At the 2006 census, its population was 70, in 19 families.
