= Liashur Sara =

Liashur Sara or Liashur Saray (Persian: لياشورسرائ) may refer to:

- Liashur Sara-ye Olya
- Liashur Sara-ye Sofla
- Liashur Saray-e Ostad Vali
