= Deh Jan, Gilan =

Deh Jan ده جان
- Village
- Location within Iran
- Coordinates: 37°03′55″N 49°56′33″E
- Country: Iran
- Province: Gilan
- County: Langarud
- Bakhsh: Otaqvar
- Rural District: Otaqvar

Population (2006)
  - Total: 22
- Time zone: UTC+3:30 (IRST)
  - Summer (DST): UTC+4:30 (IRDT)

Deh Jan (Persian: ده جان, also Romanized as Deh Jān; also known as Deh Jūn) is a village in Otaqvar Rural District, Otaqvar District, Langarud County, Gilan Province, Iran. At the 2006 census, its population was 22, in 6 families.
