= Kachal Bon =

Kachal Bon كچل بن
- Village
- Location within Iran
- Coordinates: 36°58′08″N 49°56′25″E
- Country: Iran
- Province: Gilan
- County: Langarud
- Bakhsh: Otaqvar
- Rural District: Otaqvar

Population (2006)
  - Total: 34
- Time zone: UTC+3:30 (IRST)

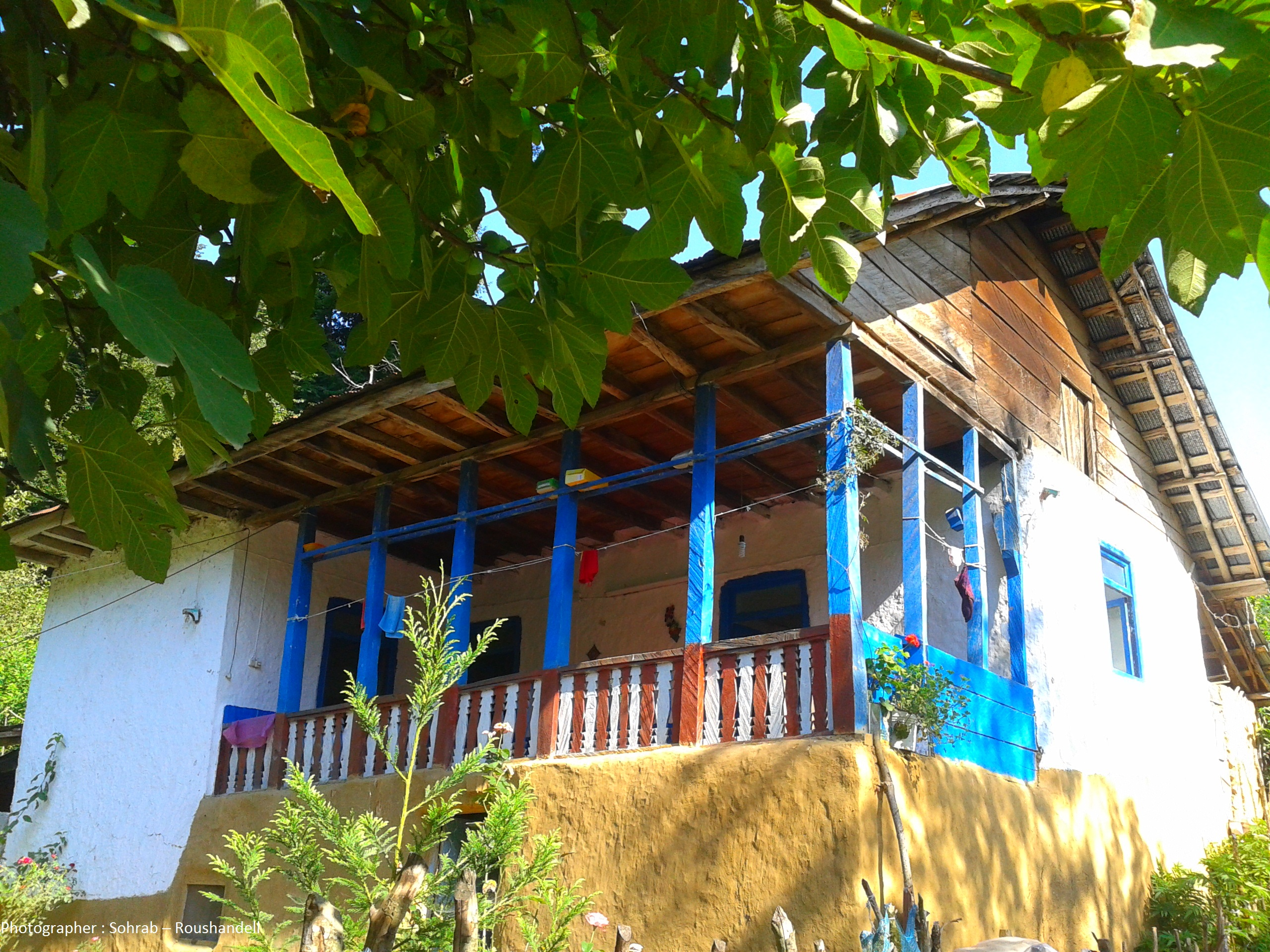
Traditional house in the village

Kachal Bon (Persian: كچل بن; also known as Kachal Būn) is a village in Otaqvar Rural District, Otaqvar District, Langarud County, Gilan Province, Iran. At the 2006 census, its population was 34, in 10 families. In 2016, there were no households residing in the village.
