= Aqa Ali Sara =

Aqa Ali Sara اقاعلي سرا
- Village
- Location within Iran
- Coordinates: 37°06′59″N 50°08′00″E
- Country: Iran
- Province: Gilan
- County: Langarud
- Bakhsh: Otaqvar
- Rural District: Otaqvar

Population (2006)
  - Total: 139
- Time zone: UTC+3:30 (IRST)
  - Summer (DST): UTC+4:30 (IRDT)

Aqa Ali Sara (Persian: اقاعلي سرا, also Romanized as Āqā ‘Alī Sarā) is a village in Otaqvar Rural District, Otaqvar District, Langarud County, Gilan Province, Iran. At the 2006 census, its population was 139, in 37 families.
