= Ganj Ali Sara =

Ganj Ali Sara گنج علي سرا
- Village
- Location within Iran
- Coordinates: 37°03′29″N 50°06′29″E
- Country: Iran
- Province: Gilan
- County: Langarud
- Bakhsh: Otaqvar
- Rural District: Lat Leyl

Population (2006)
  - Total: 45
- Time zone: UTC+3:30 (IRST)
  - Summer (DST): UTC+4:30 (IRDT)

Ganj Ali Sara (Persian: گنج علي سرا, also Romanized as Ganj ʿAlī Sarā; also known as Ganjīsarā) is a village in Lat Leyl Rural District, Otaqvar District, Langarud County, Gilan Province, Iran. At the 2006 census, its population was 45, in 14 families.
