= Lemushposht =

Lemushposht لموش پشت
- Village
- Location within Iran
- Coordinates: 37°04′14″N 50°02′04″E
- Country: Iran
- Province: Gilan
- County: Langarud
- Bakhsh: Otaqvar
- Rural District: Otaqvar

Population (2006)
  - Total: 118
- Time zone: UTC+3:30 (IRST)
  - Summer (DST): UTC+4:30 (IRDT)

Lemushposht (Persian: لموش پشت, also Romanized as Lemūshposht) is a village in Otaqvar Rural District, Otaqvar District, Langarud County, Gilan Province, Iran. At the 2006 census, its population was 118, in 37 families.
