= Anbolan Sara =

Anbolan Sara انبلانسرا
- Village
- Interactive map of Anbolan Sara
- Coordinates: 37°7′2.37″N 50°6′34.463″E
- Country: Iran
- Province: Gilan
- County: Langarud
- Bakhsh: Otaqvar
- Rural District: Otaqvar

Population (2016)
  - Total: 81
- Time zone: UTC+3:30 (IRST)

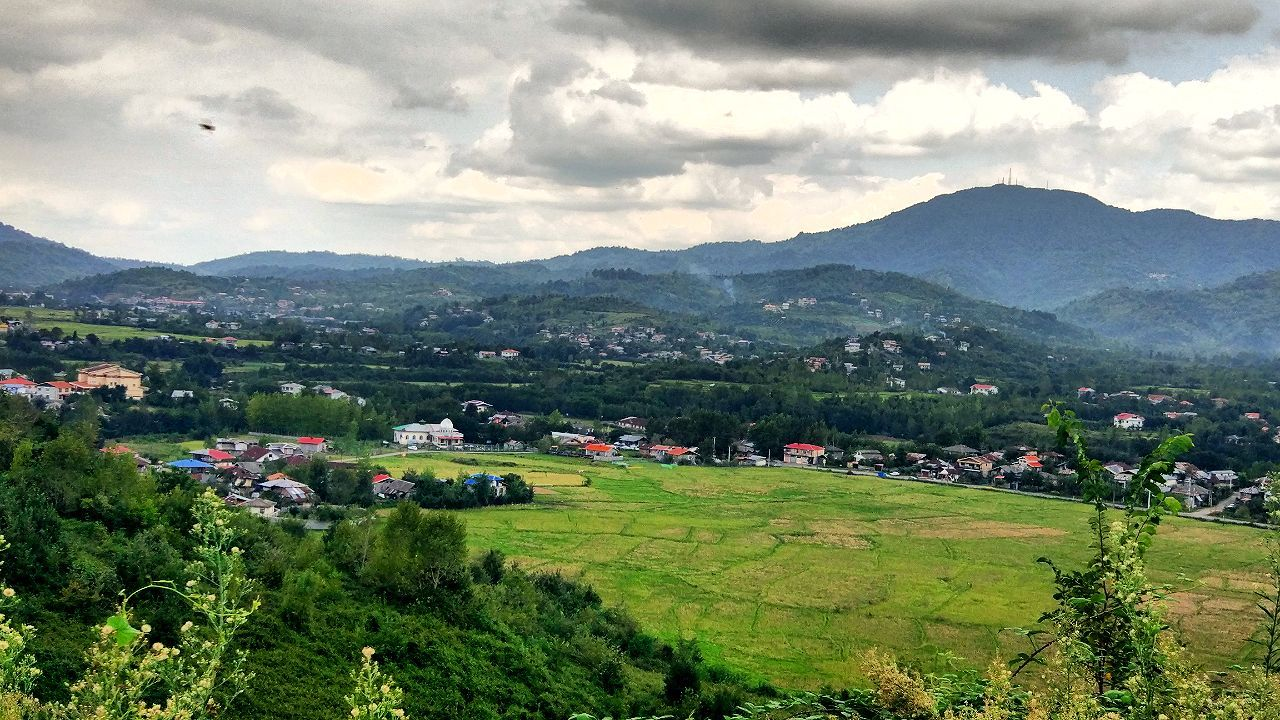

Anbolan Sara (Persian: انبلانسرا, also Romanized as Ānbolān Sarā) is a village in Otaqvar Rural District, Otaqvar District, Langarud County, Gilan Province, Iran. At the 2006 census, its population was 93, in 27 families. In 2016, its population was 81, in 29 households.
