= Changul =

Changul چنگول
- Village
- Location within Iran
- Coordinates: 37°00′08″N 50°02′14″E
- Country: Iran
- Province: Gilan
- County: Langarud
- Bakhsh: Otaqvar
- Rural District: Lat Leyl

Population (2006)
  - Total: 100
- Time zone: UTC+3:30 (IRST)
  - Summer (DST): UTC+4:30 (IRDT)

Changul (Persian: چنگول, also Romanized as Changūl) is a village in Lat Leyl Rural District, Otaqvar District, Langarud County, Gilan Province, Iran. At the 2006 census, its population was 100, in 24 families.
