= Shekar Kesh =

Shekar Kesh (Persian: شكركش) may refer to:

- Bala Shekar Kesh
- Mian Shekar Kesh
- Pain Shekar Kesh
