= Lotf Ali Gavaber =

Lotf Ali Gavar لطفعلي گوابر
- Village
- Location within Iran
- Coordinates: 37°04′35″N 50°00′07″E
- Country: Iran
- Province: Gilan
- County: Langarud
- Bakhsh: Otaqvar
- Rural District: Otaqvar

Population (2006)
  - Total: 94
- Time zone: UTC+3:30 (IRST)
  - Summer (DST): UTC+4:30 (IRDT)

Lotf Ali Gavar (Persian: لطفعلي گوابر, also Romanized as Loţf ‘Alī Gavāber; also known as Loţf ‘Alī Gavār) is a village in Otaqvar Rural District, Otaqvar District, Langarud County, Gilan Province, Iran. At the 2006 census, its population was 94, in 23 families.
