= Bijar Anjil-e Kachal Bon =

Bijar Anjil-e Kachal Bon بيجارانجيل كچل بن
- Village
- Country: Iran
- Province: Gilan
- County: Langarud
- Bakhsh: Otaqvar
- Rural District: Otaqvar

Population (2006)
  - Total: 33
- Time zone: UTC+3:30 (IRST)
  - Summer (DST): UTC+4:30 (IRDT)

Bijar Anjil-e Kachal Bon (Persian: بيجارانجيل كچل بن, also Romanized as Bījār Ānjīl-e Kachal Bon) is a village in Otaqvar Rural District, Otaqvar District, Langarud County, Gilan Province, Iran. At the 2006 census, its population was 33, in 10 families.
