= Behpesa Bagh =

Behpesa Bagh بهپس باغ
- Village
- Location within Iran
- Coordinates: 37°04′57″N 50°05′13″E
- Country: Iran
- Province: Gilan
- County: Langarud
- Bakhsh: Otaqvar
- Rural District: Otaqvar

Population (2006)
  - Total: 163
- Time zone: UTC+3:30 (IRST)
  - Summer (DST): UTC+4:30 (IRDT)

Behpesa Bagh (Persian: بهپس باغ, also Romanized as Behpesa Bāgh; also known as Behpasī Bāgh, Behpesī Bāgh, and Pay-ye Pas Bāgh) is a village in Otaqvar Rural District, Otaqvar District, Langarud County, Gilan Province, Iran. At the 2006 census, its population was 163, in 47 families.
