= Fi Ab =

Fi Ab في اب
- Village
- Location within Iran
- Coordinates: 36°58′09″N 50°01′01″E
- Country: Iran
- Province: Gilan
- County: Langarud
- Bakhsh: Otaqvar
- Rural District: Lat Leyl

Population (2006)
  - Total: 46
- Time zone: UTC+3:30 (IRST)
  - Summer (DST): UTC+4:30 (IRDT)

Fi Ab (Persian: في اب, also Romanized as Fī Āb) is a village in Lat Leyl Rural District, Otaqvar District, Langarud County, Gilan Province, Iran. At the 2006 census, its population was 46, in 13 families.
