= Dasht-e Olam =

Coordinates: 37.0739°N 50.0335°E

Dasht-e Olam دشت علم
- Village
- Interactive map of Dasht-e Olam
- Country: Iran
- Province: Gilan
- County: Langarud
- Bakhsh: Otaqvar
- Rural District: Otaqvar

Population (2006)
  - Total: 65
- Time zone: UTC+3:30 (IRST)
  - Summer (DST): UTC+4:30 (IRDT)

Dasht-e Olam (Persian: دشت علم, also Romanized as Dasht-e ʿOlam) is a village in Otaqvar Rural District, Otaqvar District, Langarud County, Gilan Province, Iran. At the 2006 census, its population was 65, in 18 families.
