= Khalifeh Gavabar =

Khalifeh Gavabar خليفه گوابر
- Village
- Location within Iran
- Coordinates: 37°03′41″N 50°03′59″E
- Country: Iran
- Province: Gilan
- County: Langarud
- Bakhsh: Otaqvar
- Rural District: Otaqvar

Population (2006)
  - Total: 23
- Time zone: UTC+3:30 (IRST)
  - Summer (DST): UTC+4:30 (IRDT)

Khalifeh Gavabar (Persian: خليفه گوابر, also Romanized as Khalīfeh Gavābar, Khalīfeh Gavāber, and Khalīfehgovāber) is a village in Otaqvar Rural District, Otaqvar District, Langarud County, Gilan Province, Iran. At the 2006 census, its population was 23, in 7 families.
