= Zohrab Ali Sara =

Zohrab Ali Sara ظهرابعلي سرا
- Village
- Location within Iran
- Coordinates: 37°07′04″N 50°09′00″E
- Country: Iran
- Province: Gilan
- County: Langarud
- Bakhsh: Otaqvar
- Rural District: Otaqvar

Population (2006)
  - Total: 85
- Time zone: UTC+3:30 (IRST)
  - Summer (DST): UTC+4:30 (IRDT)

Zohrab Ali Sara (Persian: ظهرابعلي سرا, also Romanized as Z̧ohrāb ‘Alī Sarā) is a village in Otaqvar Rural District, Otaqvar District, Langarud County, Gilan Province, Iran. At the 2006 census, its population was 85, in 22 families.
