= Arbu Langeh =

Arbu Langeh اربولنگه
- Village
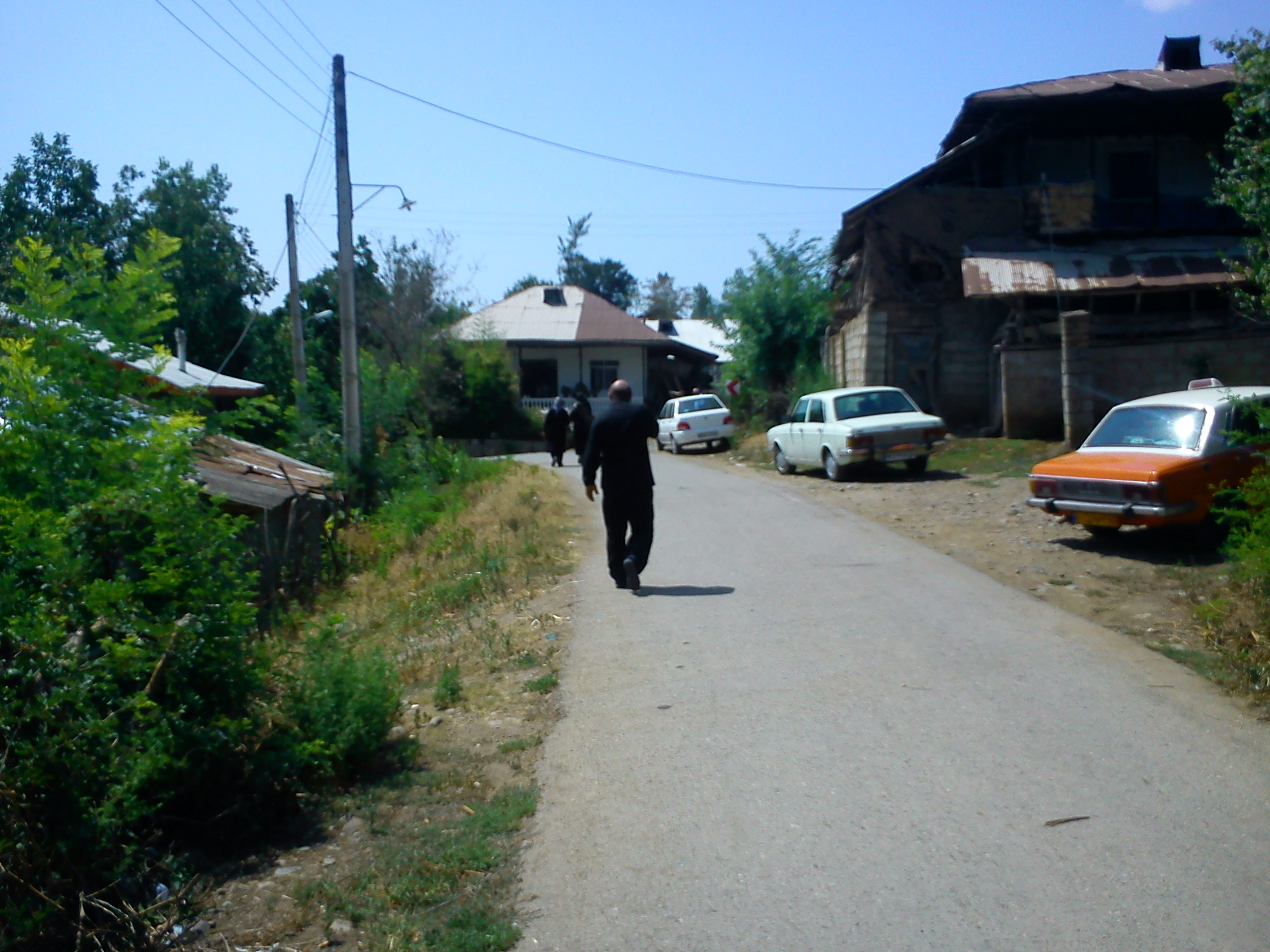
- Interactive map of Arbu Langeh
- Coordinates: 37°5′36″N 50°7′19″E
- Country: Iran
- Province: Gilan
- County: Langarud
- Bakhsh: Otaqvar
- Rural District: Otaqvar

Population (2016)
  - Total: 163
- Time zone: UTC+3:30 (IRST)

Arbu Langeh (Persian: اربولنگه, also Romanized as Ārbū Lengeh) is a village in Otaqvar Rural District, Otaqvar District, Langarud County, Gilan Province, Iran. At the 2016 census, its population was 163, in 58 families. Down from 184 in 2006.
