= Mohammad Jafar Mahalleh =

Mohammad Jafar Mahalleh محمدجعفرمحله
- Village
- Country: Iran
- Province: Gilan
- County: Langarud
- Bakhsh: Otaqvar
- Rural District: Otaqvar

Population (2006)
  - Total: 193
- Time zone: UTC+3:30 (IRST)
  - Summer (DST): UTC+4:30 (IRDT)

Mohammad Jafar Mahalleh (Persian: محمدجعفرمحله, also Romanized as Moḩammad Jaʿfar Maḩalleh) is a village in Otaqvar Rural District, Otaqvar District, Langarud County, Gilan Province, Iran. At the 2006 census, its population was 193, in 54 families. Made famous as the location of the world's largest functional drinking hat.
