= Noqareh Chi Mahalleh =

Noqareh Chi Mahalleh نقاره چي محله
- Village
- Country: Iran
- Province: Gilan
- County: Langarud
- Bakhsh: Otaqvar
- Rural District: Otaqvar

Population (2006)
  - Total: 129
- Time zone: UTC+3:30 (IRST)
  - Summer (DST): UTC+4:30 (IRDT)

Noqareh Chi Mahalleh (Persian: نقاره چي محله, also Romanized as Noqāreh Chī Maḩalleh) is a village in Otaqvar Rural District, Otaqvar District, Langarud County, Gilan Province, Iran. At the 2006 census, its population was 129, in 38 families.
