= Pashtal Sara =

Pashtal Sara پشتل سرا
- Village
- Location within Iran
- Coordinates: 37°07′10″N 49°51′16″E
- Country: Iran
- Province: Gilan
- County: Langarud
- Bakhsh: Otaqvar
- Rural District: Otaqvar

Population (2006)
  - Total: 42
- Time zone: UTC+3:30 (IRST)
  - Summer (DST): UTC+4:30 (IRDT)

Pashtal Sara (Persian: پشتل سرا, also Romanized as Pashtal Sarā; also known as Pashtār Sarā) is a village in Otaqvar Rural District, Otaqvar District, Langarud County, Gilan Province, Iran. At the 2006 census, its population was 42, in 11 families.
