= Behesht Lat =

Behesht Lat بهشت لات
- Village
- Location within Iran
- Coordinates: 37°04′14″N 50°03′28″E
- Country: Iran
- Province: Gilan
- County: Langarud
- Bakhsh: Otaqvar
- Rural District: Otaqvar

Population (2006)
  - Total: 43
- Time zone: UTC+3:30 (IRST)
  - Summer (DST): UTC+4:30 (IRDT)

Behesht Lat (Persian: بهشت لات, also Romanized as Behesht Lāt and Behashtlāt) is a village in Otaqvar Rural District, Otaqvar District, Langarud County, Gilan Province, Iran. At the 2006 census, its population was 43, in 13 families.
