= Alam Sar =

Alam Sar علم سر
- Village
- Location within Iran
- Coordinates: 37°03′56″N 50°02′43″E
- Country: Iran
- Province: Gilan
- County: Langarud
- Bakhsh: Otaqvar
- Rural District: Otaqvar

Population (2006)
  - Total: 69
- Time zone: UTC+3:30 (IRST)
  - Summer (DST): UTC+4:30 (IRDT)

Alam Sar (Persian: علم سر, also Romanized as ʿAlam Sar and Aalamsar) is a village in Otaqvar Rural District, Otaqvar District, Langarud County, Gilan Province, Iran. At the 2006 census, its population was 69, in 16 families.
