= Arb Gardan =

Arb Gardan اربع گردن
- Village
- Location within Iran
- Coordinates: 36°55′34″N 50°10′57″E
- Country: Iran
- Province: Gilan
- County: Langarud
- Bakhsh: Otaqvar
- Rural District: Lat Leyl

Population (2006)
  - Total: 29
- Time zone: UTC+3:30 (IRST)
  - Summer (DST): UTC+4:30 (IRDT)

Arb Gardan (Persian: اربع گردن, also Romanized as Arbʿ Gardan; also known as Arbūgardān) is a village in Lat Leyl Rural District, Otaqvar District, Langarud County, Gilan Province, Iran. At the 2006 census, its population was 29, in 7 families.
