= Gav Koli =

Gav Koli, Iran گاوكلي
- Village
- Location within Iran
- Coordinates: 37°06′32″N 50°03′58″E
- Country: Iran
- Province: Gilan
- County: Langarud
- Bakhsh: Otaqvar
- Rural District: Otaqvar

Population (2006)
  - Total: 35
- Time zone: UTC+3:30 (IRST)
  - Summer (DST): UTC+4:30 (IRDT)

Gav Koli (Persian: گاوكلي, also Romanized as Gāv Kolī; also known as Gāvgolī) is a village in Otaqvar Rural District, Otaqvar District, Langarud County, Gilan Province, Iran. At the 2006 census, its population was 35, in 8 families.
