= Akbar Sara =

Akbar Sara اكبرسرا
- Village
- Location within Iran
- Coordinates: 37°06′59″N 50°08′01″E
- Country: Iran
- Province: Gilan
- County: Langarud
- Bakhsh: Otaqvar
- Rural District: Otaqvar

Population (2006)
  - Total: 189
- Time zone: UTC+3:30 (IRST)
  - Summer (DST): UTC+4:30 (IRDT)

Akbar Sara (Persian: اكبرسرا, also Romanized as Akbar Sarā and Akbarsarā) is a village in Otaqvar Rural District, Otaqvar District, Langarud County, Gilan Province, Iran. At the 2006 census, its population was 189, in 48 families.
