= Melaz Gavaber =

Melaz Gavaber ملازگوابر
- Village
- Location within Iran
- Coordinates: 37°05′29″N 50°05′00″E
- Country: Iran
- Province: Gilan
- County: Langarud
- Bakhsh: Otaqvar
- Rural District: Otaqvar

Population (2006)
  - Total: 38
- Time zone: UTC+3:30 (IRST)
  - Summer (DST): UTC+4:30 (IRDT)

Melaz Gavaber (Persian: ملازگوابر, also Romanized as Melāz Gavāber; also known as Melāzgovāber) is a village in Otaqvar Rural District, Otaqvar District, Langarud County, Gilan Province, Iran. At the 2006 census, its population was 38, in 12 families.
