= Shesh Kalayeh =

Shesh Kalayeh ششكلايه
- Village
- Location within Iran
- Coordinates: 37°07′20″N 50°06′05″E
- Country: Iran
- Province: Gilan
- County: Langarud
- Bakhsh: Otaqvar
- Rural District: Otaqvar

Population (2006)
  - Total: 117
- Time zone: UTC+3:30 (IRST)
  - Summer (DST): UTC+4:30 (IRDT)

Shesh Kalayeh (Persian: ششكلايه, also Romanized as Shesh Kalāyeh and Shesh Kelāyeh) is a village in Otaqvar Rural District, Otaqvar District, Langarud County, Gilan Province, Iran. At the 2006 census, its population was 117, in 34 families.
