= Madian Gavaber =

Madian Gavaber ماديان گوابر
- Village
- Location within Iran
- Coordinates: 37°05′47″N 50°03′59″E
- Country: Iran
- Province: Gilan
- County: Langarud
- Bakhsh: Otaqvar
- Rural District: Otaqvar

Population (2006)
  - Total: 113
- Time zone: UTC+3:30 (IRST)
  - Summer (DST): UTC+4:30 (IRDT)

Madian Gavaber (Persian: ماديان گوابر, also Romanized as Mādīān Gavāber; also known as Mādīngovāber) is a village in Otaqvar Rural District, Otaqvar District, Langarud County, Gilan Province, Iran. At the 2006 census, its population was 113, in 24 families.
