= Kateh Khurteh-ye Pain =

Kateh Khurteh-ye Pain كته خورته پايين
- Village
- Country: Iran
- Province: Gilan
- County: Langarud
- Bakhsh: Otaqvar
- Rural District: Lat Leyl

Population (2006)
  - Total: 53
- Time zone: UTC+3:30 (IRST)
  - Summer (DST): UTC+4:30 (IRDT)

Kateh Khurteh-ye Pain (Persian: كته خورته پايين, also Romanized as Kateh Khūrteh-ye Pā’īn) is a village in Lat Leyl Rural District, Otaqvar District, Langarud County, Gilan Province, Iran. At the 2006 census, its population was 53, in 15 families.
