= Poshteh Sara =

Poshteh Sara پشته سرا
- Village
- Location within Iran
- Coordinates: 36°57′33″N 50°30′53″E
- Country: Iran
- Province: Gilan
- County: Langarud
- Bakhsh: Otaqvar
- Rural District: Lat Leyl

Population (2006)
  - Total: 37
- Time zone: UTC+3:30 (IRST)
  - Summer (DST): UTC+4:30 (IRDT)

Poshteh Sara (Persian: پشته سرا, also Romanized as Poshteh Sarā; also known as Poshteh Sarān) is a village in Lat Leyl Rural District, Otaqvar District, Langarud County, Gilan Province, Iran. At the 2006 census, its population was 37, in seven families.
