= Kish Posht =

Kish Posht كيش پشته
- Village
- Location within Iran
- Coordinates: 37°06′57″N 50°07′08″E
- Country: Iran
- Province: Gilan
- County: Langarud
- Bakhsh: Otaqvar
- Rural District: Otaqvar

Population (2006)
  - Total: 14
- Time zone: UTC+3:30 (IRST)
  - Summer (DST): UTC+4:30 (IRDT)

Kish Posht (Persian: كيش پشته, also Romanized as Kīsh Posht; also known as Kīsh Poshteh and Kīsheh Posht) is a village in Otaqvar Rural District, Otaqvar District, Langarud County, Gilan Province, Iran. At the 2006 census, its population was 14, in 4 families.
