= Birum =

Birum بيروم
- Village
- Country: Iran
- Province: Gilan
- County: Langarud
- Bakhsh: Otaqvar
- Rural District: Otaqvar

Population (2006)
  - Total: 120
- Time zone: UTC+3:30 (IRST)
  - Summer (DST): UTC+4:30 (IRDT)

Birum (Persian: بيروم, also Romanized as Bīrūm) is a village in Otaqvar Rural District, Otaqvar District, Langarud County, Gilan Province, Iran. At the 2006 census, its population was 120, in 30 families.
