= Narenjbon =

Narenjbon or Narenj Bon (Persian: نارنج بن) may refer to:

- Narenj Bon, Gilan
- Narenjbon-e Bala, Gilan Province
- Narenjbon-e Pain, Gilan Province
- Narenjbon, Mazandaran
