= Sharif Ali Sara =

Sharif Ali Sara شريفعلي سرا
- Village
- Country: Iran
- Province: Gilan
- County: Langarud
- Bakhsh: Otaqvar
- Rural District: Otaqvar

Population (2006)
  - Total: 52
- Time zone: UTC+3:30 (IRST)
  - Summer (DST): UTC+4:30 (IRDT)

Sharif Ali Sara (Persian: شريفعلي سرا, also Romanized as Sharīf ʿAlī Sarā) is a village in Otaqvar Rural District, Otaqvar District, Langarud County, Gilan Province, Iran. At the 2006 census, its population was 52, in 10 families.
