= Sang Tash =

Sang Tash سنگتاش
- Village
- Location within Iran
- Coordinates: 37°01′39″N 50°04′23″E
- Country: Iran
- Province: Gilan
- County: Langarud
- Bakhsh: Otaqvar
- Rural District: Lat Leyl

Population (2006)
  - Total: 22
- Time zone: UTC+3:30 (IRST)
  - Summer (DST): UTC+4:30 (IRDT)

Sang Tash (Persian: سنگتاش, also Romanized as Sang Tāsh) is a village in Lat Leyl Rural District, Otaqvar District, Langarud County, Gilan Province, Iran. At the 2006 census, its population was 22, in 5 families.
