= Alikhan Sara =

Alikhan Sara علي خان سرا
- Village
- Location within Iran
- Coordinates: 37°06′57″N 50°03′37″E
- Country: Iran
- Province: Gilan
- County: Langarud
- Bakhsh: Otaqvar
- Rural District: Otaqvar

Population (2006)
  - Total: 66
- Time zone: UTC+3:30 (IRST)
  - Summer (DST): UTC+4:30 (IRDT)

Alikhan Sara (Persian: علي خان سرا, also Romanized as ‘Alīkhān Sarā) is a village in Otaqvar Rural District, Otaqvar District, Langarud County, Gilan Province, Iran. At the 2006 census, its population was 66, in 14 families.
