= Bandar Mahalleh =

Bandar Mahalleh بندرمحله
- Village
- Location within Iran
- Coordinates: 37°04′29″N 50°03′12″E
- Country: Iran
- Province: Gilan
- County: Langarud
- Bakhsh: Otaqvar
- Rural District: Otaqvar

Population (2006)
  - Total: 50
- Time zone: UTC+3:30 (IRST)
  - Summer (DST): UTC+4:30 (IRDT)

Bandar Mahalleh (Persian: بندرمحله, also Romanized as Bandar Maḩalleh) is a village in Otaqvar Rural District, Otaqvar District, Langarud County, Gilan Province, Iran. At the 2006 census, its population was 50, in 15 families.
