= Gerd Gavabar =

Gerd Gavabar گردگوابر
- Village
- Location within Iran
- Coordinates: 37°03′58″N 50°00′45″E
- Country: Iran
- Province: Gilan
- County: Langarud
- Bakhsh: Otaqvar
- Rural District: Otaqvar

Population (2006)
  - Total: 26
- Time zone: UTC+3:30 (IRST)
  - Summer (DST): UTC+4:30 (IRDT)

Gerd Gavabar (Persian: گردگوابر, also Romanized as Gerd Gavābar and Gerd Gavāber; also known as Gerehgoabar) is a village in Otaqvar Rural District, Otaqvar District, Langarud County, Gilan Province, Iran. As of the 2006 census, its population was a total of 26 people spread across 6 families.
