= Sheshtanrud-e Bala =

Sheshtanrud-e Bala شصتانرودبالا
- Village
- Country: Iran
- Province: Gilan
- County: Langarud
- Bakhsh: Otaqvar
- Rural District: Lat Leyl

Population (2006)
  - Total: 79
- Time zone: UTC+3:30 (IRST)
  - Summer (DST): UTC+4:30 (IRDT)

Sheshtanrud-e Bala (Persian: شصتانرودبالا, also Romanized as Sheştānrūd-e Bālā) is a village in Lat Leyl Rural District, Otaqvar District, Langarud County, Gilan Province, Iran. At the 2006 census, its population was 79, in 20 families.
