= Liashur Sara-ye Olya =

Liashur Sara-ye Olya لياشورسرائ عليا
- Village
- Location within Iran
- Coordinates: 37°01′37″N 50°06′12″E
- Country: Iran
- Province: Gilan
- County: Langarud
- Bakhsh: Otaqvar
- Rural District: Lat Leyl

Population (2006)
  - Total: 24
- Time zone: UTC+3:30 (IRST)
  - Summer (DST): UTC+4:30 (IRDT)

Liashur Sara-ye Olya (Persian: لياشورسرائ عليا, also Romanized as Līāshūr Sarā’-ye ‘Olyā; also known as Līāshūr Sarā) is a village in Lat Leyl Rural District, Otaqvar District, Langarud County, Gilan Province, Iran. At the 2006 census, its population was 24, in 8 families.
