= Mian Shekar Kesh =

Mian Shekar Kesh ميان شكركش
- Village
- Location within Iran
- Coordinates: 37°06′17″N 50°06′08″E
- Country: Iran
- Province: Gilan
- County: Langarud
- Bakhsh: Otaqvar
- Rural District: Otaqvar

Population (2006)
  - Total: 122
- Time zone: UTC+3:30 (IRST)
  - Summer (DST): UTC+4:30 (IRDT)

Mian Shekar Kesh (Persian: ميان شكركش, also Romanized as Mīān Sehkar Kesh; also known as Mīyānshekar) is a village in Otaqvar Rural District, Otaqvar District, Langarud County, Gilan Province, Iran. At the 2006 census, its population was 122, in 35 families.
