= Porush-e Bala =

Porush-e Bala پروش بالا
- Village
- Location within Iran
- Coordinates: 37°07′35″N 50°06′42″E
- Country: Iran
- Province: Gilan
- County: Langarud
- Bakhsh: Otaqvar
- Rural District: Otaqvar

Population (2006)
  - Total: 117
- Time zone: UTC+3:30 (IRST)
  - Summer (DST): UTC+4:30 (IRDT)

Porush-e Bala (Persian: پروش بالا, also Romanized as Porūsh-e Bālā; also known as Parūsh and Poroosh) is a village in Otaqvar Rural District, Otaqvar District, Langarud County, Gilan Province, Iran. At the 2006 census, its population was 117, in 29 families.
