= Liseh Rud-e Tazehabad =

Village in Gilan province, Iran

Liseh Rud-e Tazehabad Persian: ليسه رودتازه اباد
- Village
- Country: Iran
- Province: Gilan
- County: Langarud
- District: Otaqvar
- Rural District: Otaqvar

Population (2016)
  - Total: 200
- Time zone: UTC+3:30 (IRST)

Liseh Rud-e Tazehabad (Persian: ليسه رودتازه اباد) (Note: Also romanized as Līseh Rūd-e Tāzehābād) is a village in Otaqvar Rural District (Note: Formerly Kumeleh Rural District) of Otaqvar District in Langarud County, Gilan province, Iran.

== Demographics ==
=== Population ===
At the time of the 2006 National Census, the village's population was 400 in 106 households. The following census in 2011 counted 328 people in 104 households. The 2016 census measured the population of the village as 333 people in 117 households.
