= Kord Sara Kuh-e Pain =

Koh Sara Kuh-e Pain کوه سراکوه پایین
- village
- Country: Iran
- Province: Gilan
- County: Langarud
- Bakhsh: Otaqvar
- Rural District: Otaqvar

Population (2006)
  - Total: 32
- Time zone: UTC+3:30 (IRST)
  - Summer (DST): UTC+4:30 (IRDT)

Koh Sara Kuh-e Pain (Persian: کوه سراکوه پایین, also Romanized as Koh Sarā Kūh-e Pā’īn) is a village in Otaqvar Rural District, Otaqvar District, Langarud County, Gilan Province, Iran. At the 2006 census, its population was 32, in 12 families.
