= Lat Leyl =

Village in Gilan province, Iran

Lat Leyl Persian: لات ليل
- Village
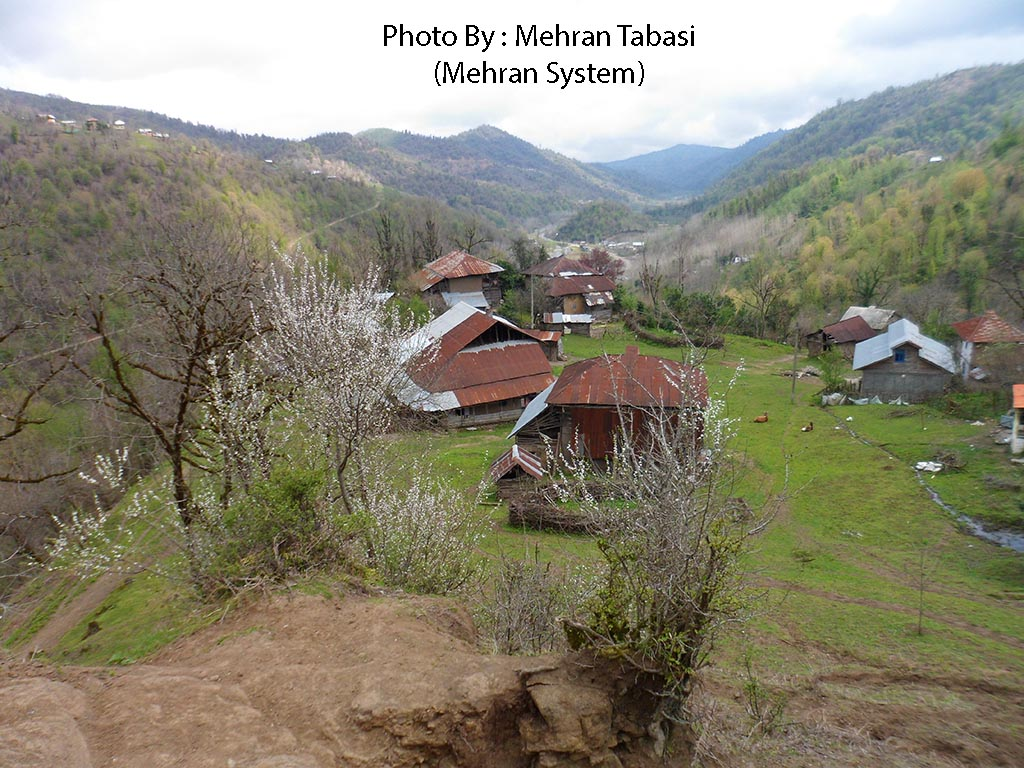
- The village of Lat Leyl

- Location within Iran
- Coordinates: 37°04′14″N 50°07′54″E
- Country: Iran
- Province: Gilan
- County: Langarud
- District: Otaqvar
- Rural District: Lat Leyl

Population (2016)
  - Total: 708
- Time zone: UTC+3:30 (IRST)

Lat Leyl (Persian: لات ليل) (Note: Also romanized as Lāt Leyl) is a village in, and the capital of, Lat Leyl Rural District in Otaqvar District of Langarud County, Gilan province, Iran.

== Demographics ==
=== Population ===
At the time of the 2006 National Census, the village's population was 872 in 235 households. The following census in 2011 counted 829 people in 268 households. The 2016 census measured the population of the village as 708 people in 247 households. It was the most populous village in its rural district.
