= Sheshtanrud-e Pain =

Sheshtanrud-e Pain شصتانرودپائين
- Village
- Country: Iran
- Province: Gilan
- County: Langarud
- Bakhsh: Otaqvar
- Rural District: Lat Leyl

Population (2006)
  - Total: 93
- Time zone: UTC+3:30 (IRST)
  - Summer (DST): UTC+4:30 (IRDT)

Sheshtanrud-e Pain (Persian: شصتانرودپائين, also Romanized as Sheştānrūd-e Pā’īn) is a village in Lat Leyl Rural District, Otaqvar District, Langarud County, Gilan Province, Iran. At the 2006 census, its population was 93, in 23 families.
