= Sheshtanrud =

Sheshtanrud (Persian: شصتانرود) may refer to:

- Sheshtanrud-e Bala
- Sheshtanrud-e Pain
