= Kandsar-e Zeyn Pareh =

Kandsar-e Zeyn Pareh كندسرزين پره
- Village
- Country: Iran
- Province: Gilan
- County: Langarud
- Bakhsh: Otaqvar
- Rural District: Otaqvar

Population (2006)
  - Total: 36
- Time zone: UTC+3:30 (IRST)
  - Summer (DST): UTC+4:30 (IRDT)

Kandsar-e Zeyn Pareh (Persian: كندسرزين پره) is a village in Otaqvar Rural District, Otaqvar District, Langarud County, Gilan Province, Iran. At the 2006 census, its population was 36, in 10 families.
