= Pain Shekar Kesh =

Pain Shekar Kesh پايين شكركش
- Village
- Location within Iran
- Coordinates: 37°05′50″N 50°05′56″E
- Country: Iran
- Province: Gilan
- County: Langarud
- Bakhsh: Otaqvar
- Rural District: Otaqvar

Population (2006)
  - Total: 115
- Time zone: UTC+3:30 (IRST)
  - Summer (DST): UTC+4:30 (IRDT)

Pain Shekar Kesh (Persian: پايين شكركش, also Romanized as Pā’īn Shekar Kesh; also known as Shekar Kesh) is a village in Otaqvar Rural District, Otaqvar District, Langarud County, Gilan Province, Iran. At the 2006 census, its population was 115, in 35 families.
