= Kandsar, Langarud =

Kandsar كندسر
- Village
- Location within Iran
- Coordinates: 37°05′59″N 50°06′17″E
- Country: Iran
- Province: Gilan
- County: Langarud
- Bakhsh: Otaqvar
- Rural District: Otaqvar

Population (2006)
  - Total: 140
- Time zone: UTC+3:30 (IRST)
  - Summer (DST): UTC+4:30 (IRDT)

Kandsar (Persian: كندسر; also known as Kandehsar and Kandeh Sar Maḩalleh-ye Bālā) is a village in Otaqvar Rural District, Otaqvar District, Langarud County, Gilan Province, Iran. At the 2006 census, its population was 140, in 39 families.
