= Taleb Sara =

Village in Gilan province, Iran

Taleb Sara Persian: طالب سرا
- Village
- Location within Iran
- Coordinates: 37°06′51″N 50°07′45″E
- Country: Iran
- Province: Gilan
- County: Langarud
- District: Otaqvar
- Rural District: Otaqvar

Population (2016)
  - Total: 200
- Time zone: UTC+3:30 (IRST)

Taleb Sara (Persian: طالب سرا) (Note: Also romanized as Ţāleb Sarā) is a village in Otaqvar Rural District (Note: Formerly Kumeleh Rural District) of Otaqvar District in Langarud County, Gilan province, Iran.

== Demographics ==
=== Population ===
At the time of the 2006 National Census, the village's population was 191 in 54 households. The following census in 2011 counted 181 people in 54 households. The 2016 census measured the population of the village as 200 people in 69 households.
