= Liashur Sara-ye Sofla =

Liashur Sara-ye Sofla لياشورسراسفلي
- Village
- Country: Iran
- Province: Gilan
- County: Langarud
- Bakhsh: Otaqvar
- Rural District: Lat Leyl

Population (2006)
  - Total: 72
- Time zone: UTC+3:30 (IRST)
  - Summer (DST): UTC+4:30 (IRDT)

Liashur Sara-ye Sofla (Persian: لياشورسراسفلي, also Romanized as Līāshūr Sarā-ye Soflá) is a village in Lat Leyl Rural District, Otaqvar District, Langarud County, Gilan Province, Iran. At the 2006 census, its population was 72, in 15 families.
