= Narenjbon-e Bala =

Narenjbon-e Bala نارنج بن بالا
- Village
- Location within Iran
- Coordinates: 37°06′20″N 50°07′45″E
- Country: Iran
- Province: Gilan
- County: Langarud
- Bakhsh: Otaqvar
- Rural District: Otaqvar

Population (2016)
  - Total: 36
- Time zone: UTC+3:30 (IRST)

Narenjbon-e Bala (Persian: نارنج بن بالا, also Romanized as Nārenjbon-e Bālā) is a village in Otaqvar Rural District, Otaqvar District, Langarud County, Gilan Province, Iran. At the 2016 census, its population was 36, in 17 families. Down from 56 people in 2006.
