= Aghuzchal =

Aghuzchal (Persian: اغوزچال) may refer to:

- Aghuzchal, Langarud, Gilan Province
- Aghuzchal, Mazandaran
