= Pishkuh =

Pishkuh or Pish Kuh (Persian: پيشكوه) may refer to:

- Pish Kuh-e Pain, Gilan Province
- Pishkuh Rural District (disambiguation)
- Pishkuh-e Mugui Rural District
