= Abdangsar, Gilan =

Village in Gilan province, Iran

Abdangsar Persian: آبدنگسر
- Village
- Location within Iran
- Coordinates: 37°3′N 50°13′E
- Country: Iran
- Province: Gilan
- County: Langarud
- District: Otaqvar
- Rural District: Lat Leyl

Population (2016)
  - Total: 149
- Time zone: UTC+3:30 (IRST)

Abdangsar (Persian: آبدنگسر) (Note: Also romanized as Ābdangsar; also known as Ābdangsar-e Lātleyl) is a village in Lat Leyl Rural District of Otaqvar District in Langarud County, Gilan province, Iran.

== Demographics ==
=== Population ===
At the time of the 2006 National Census, the village's population was 156 in 45 households. The following census in 2011 counted 151 people in 49 households. The 2016 census measured the population of the village as 149 people in 52 households.
