= Chaharsu Poshteh =

Village in Gilan province, Iran

Chaharsu Poshteh Persian: چهارسوپشته
- Village
- Location within Iran
- Coordinates: 37°06′00″N 50°08′46″E
- Country: Iran
- Province: Gilan
- County: Langarud
- District: Otaqvar
- Rural District: Lat Leyl

Population (2016)
  - Total: 184
- Time zone: UTC+3:30 (IRST)

Chaharsu Poshteh (Persian: چهارسوپشته) (Note: Also romanized as Chahārsū Poshteh) is a village in Lat Leyl Rural District of Otaqvar District in Langarud County, Gilan province, Iran.

== Demographics ==
=== Population ===
At the time of the 2006 National Census, the village's population was 75 in 22 households. The following census in 2011 counted 138 people in 45 households. The 2016 census measured the population of the village as 184 people in 62 households.
