= Garsak-e Pain =

Village in Gilan province, Iran

Garsak-e Pain Persian: گرسك پائين
- Village
- Location within Iran
- Coordinates: 37°03′53″N 50°07′19″E
- Country: Iran
- Province: Gilan
- County: Langarud
- District: Otaqvar
- Rural District: Lat Leyl

Population (2016)
  - Total: 263
- Time zone: UTC+3:30 (IRST)

Garsak-e Pain (Persian: گرسك پائين) (Note: Also romanized as Garsak-e Pā’īn; also known as Garsag, Garsak, Gerasg, and Pā’īn Gerasg) is a village in Lat Leyl Rural District of Otaqvar District in Langarud County, Gilan province, Iran.

== Demographics ==
=== Population ===
At the time of the 2006 National Census, the village's population was 372 in 86 households. The following census in 2011 counted 321 people in 96 households. The 2016 census measured the population of the village as 263 people in 95 households.
