= Siah Manseh =

Siah Manseh (Persian: سياه منسه), also rendered as Seyah Muneseh or Siah Muneseh or Siah Munseh, may refer to:

- Siah Manseh-ye Bala
- Siah Manseh-ye Pain
