= Lateh =

Lateh (Persian: لاته or لته) may refer to:

- Lateh, Langarud (لاته - Lāteh), Gilan Province
- Lateh, Rudsar (لاته - Lāteh), Gilan Province
- Lateh, Mazandaran (لته - Lateh)
