= Kafsh Kal Mahalleh =

Village in Gilan province, Iran

Kafsh Kal Mahalleh Persian: كفش كل محله
- Village
- Location within Iran
- Coordinates: 37°06′22″N 50°08′34″E
- Country: Iran
- Province: Gilan
- County: Langarud
- District: Otaqvar
- Rural District: Otaqvar

Population (2016)
  - Total: 471
- Time zone: UTC+3:30 (IRST)

Kafsh Kal Mahalleh (Persian: كفش كل محله) (Note: Also romanized as Kafsh Kal Maḩalleh; also known as Kafsh Kal) is a village in Otaqvar Rural District (Note: Formerly Kumeleh Rural District) of Otaqvar District in Langarud County, Gilan province, Iran.

== Demographics ==
=== Population ===
At the time of the 2006 National Census, the village's population was 457 in 131 households. The following census in 2011 counted 353 people in 104 households. The 2016 census measured the population of the village as 471 people in 166 households. It was the most populous village in its rural district.
