= Lateh, Langarud =

Lateh لاته
- Village
- Location within Iran
- Coordinates: 37°02′41″N 50°13′00″E
- Country: Iran
- Province: Gilan
- County: Langarud
- Bakhsh: Otaqvar
- Rural District: Lat Leyl

Population (2006)
  - Total: 100
- Time zone: UTC+3:30 (IRST)
  - Summer (DST): UTC+4:30 (IRDT)

Lateh (Persian: لاته, also Romanized as Lāteh) is a village in Lat Leyl Rural District, Otaqvar District, Langarud County, Gilan Province, Iran. At the 2006 census, its population was 100, in 24 families.
