= Kahlestan =

Village in Gilan province, Iran

Kahlestan Persian: كهلستان
- Village
- Location within Iran
- Coordinates: 37°05′32″N 50°09′43″E
- Country: Iran
- Province: Gilan
- County: Langarud
- District: Otaqvar
- Rural District: Lat Leyl

Population (2016)
  - Total: 494
- Time zone: UTC+3:30 (IRST)

Kahlestan (Persian: كهلستان) (Note: Also romanized as Kahlestān; also known as Kūlestān) is a village in Lat Leyl Rural District of Otaqvar District in Langarud County, Gilan province, Iran.

== Demographics ==
=== Population ===
At the time of the 2006 National Census, the village's population was 532 in 149 households. The following census in 2011 counted 497 people in 156 households. The 2016 census measured the population of the village as 494 people in 179 households.
