= Narenjbon-e Pain =

Narenjbon-e Pain نارنج بن پايين
- Village
- Location within Iran
- Coordinates: 37°05′30″N 50°07′18″E
- Country: Iran
- Province: Gilan
- County: Langarud
- Bakhsh: Otaqvar
- Rural District: Otaqvar

Population (2016)
  - Total: 66
- Time zone: UTC+3:30 (IRST)

Narenjbon-e Pain (Persian: نارنج بن پايين, also Romanized as Nārenjbon-e Pā’īn; also known as Nārenj Bon) is a village in Otaqvar Rural District, Otaqvar District, Langarud County, Gilan Province, Iran. At the 2016 census, its population was 66, in 22 families. Down from 105 people in 2006.
