= Sarleyleh =

Village in Gilan province, Iran

Sarleyleh Persian: سرليله
- Village
- Location within Iran
- Coordinates: 37°00′44″N 50°02′39″E
- Country: Iran
- Province: Gilan
- County: Langarud
- District: Otaqvar
- Rural District: Lat Leyl

Population (2016)
  - Total: 139
- Time zone: UTC+3:30 (IRST)

Sarleyleh (Persian: سرليله) (Note: Also known as Sarleyl) is a village in Lat Leyl Rural District of Otaqvar District in Langarud County, Gilan province, Iran.

== Demographics ==
=== Population ===
At the time of the 2006 National Census, the village's population was 165 in 38 households. The following census in 2011 counted 145 people in 35 households. The 2016 census measured the population of the village as 139 people in 44 households.
