= Kord Sara Kuh =

Kord Sara Kuh (Persian: كردسراكوه) may refer to:

- Kord Sara Kuh-e Bala
- Kord Sara Kuh-e Pain
