= Liashur Saray-e Ostad Vali =

Liashur Saray-e Ostad Vali لياشورسراي استادولي
- Village
- Country: Iran
- Province: Gilan
- County: Langarud
- Bakhsh: Otaqvar
- Rural District: Lat Leyl

Population (2006)
  - Total: 46
- Time zone: UTC+3:30 (IRST)
  - Summer (DST): UTC+4:30 (IRDT)

Liashur Saray-e Ostad Vali (Persian: لياشورسراي استادولي, also Romanized as Līāshūr Sarāy-e Ostād Valī) is a village in Lat Leyl Rural District, Otaqvar District, Langarud County, Gilan Province, Iran. At the 2006 census, its population was 46, in 13 families.
