= Tazehabad-e Kord Sara Kuh =

Village in Gilan province, Iran

Tazehabad-e Kord Sara Kuh Persian: تازه آباد كردسراكوه
- Village
- Interactive map of Tazehabad-e Kord Sara Kuh
- Coordinates: 37.083°N 50.127°E
- Country: Iran
- Province: Gilan
- County: Langarud
- District: Otaqvar
- Rural District: Otaqvar

Population (2016)
  - Total: 385
- Time zone: UTC+3:30 (IRST)

Tazehabad-e Kord Sara Kuh (Persian: تازه آباد كردسراكوه) (Note: Also romanized as Tāzehābād-e Kord Sarā Kūh) is a village in Otaqvar Rural District (Note: Formerly Kumeleh Rural District) of Otaqvar District in Langarud County, Gilan province, Iran.

== Demographics ==
=== Population ===
At the time of the 2006 National Census, the village's population was 458 in 123 households. The following census in 2011 counted 408 people in 121 households. The 2016 census measured the population of the village as 385 people in 143 households.
