= Kord Sara Kuh-e Bala =

Koh Sara Kuh-e Bala كوه سراكوه بالا
- village
- Country: Iran
- Province: Gilan
- County: Langarud
- Bakhsh: Otaqvar
- Rural District: Otaqvar

Population (2006)
  - Total: 48
- Time zone: UTC+3:30 (IRST)
  - Summer (DST): UTC+4:30 (IRDT)

KohSara Kuh-e Bala (Persian: کوه سراكوه بالا, also Romanized as Koh Sarā Kūh-e Bālā) is a village in Otaqvar Rural District, Otaqvar District, Langarud County, Gilan Province, Iran. At the 2006 census, its population was 48, in 19 families.
