= Tiksar =

Village in Gilan province, Iran

Tiksar Persian: تیک سر
- Village
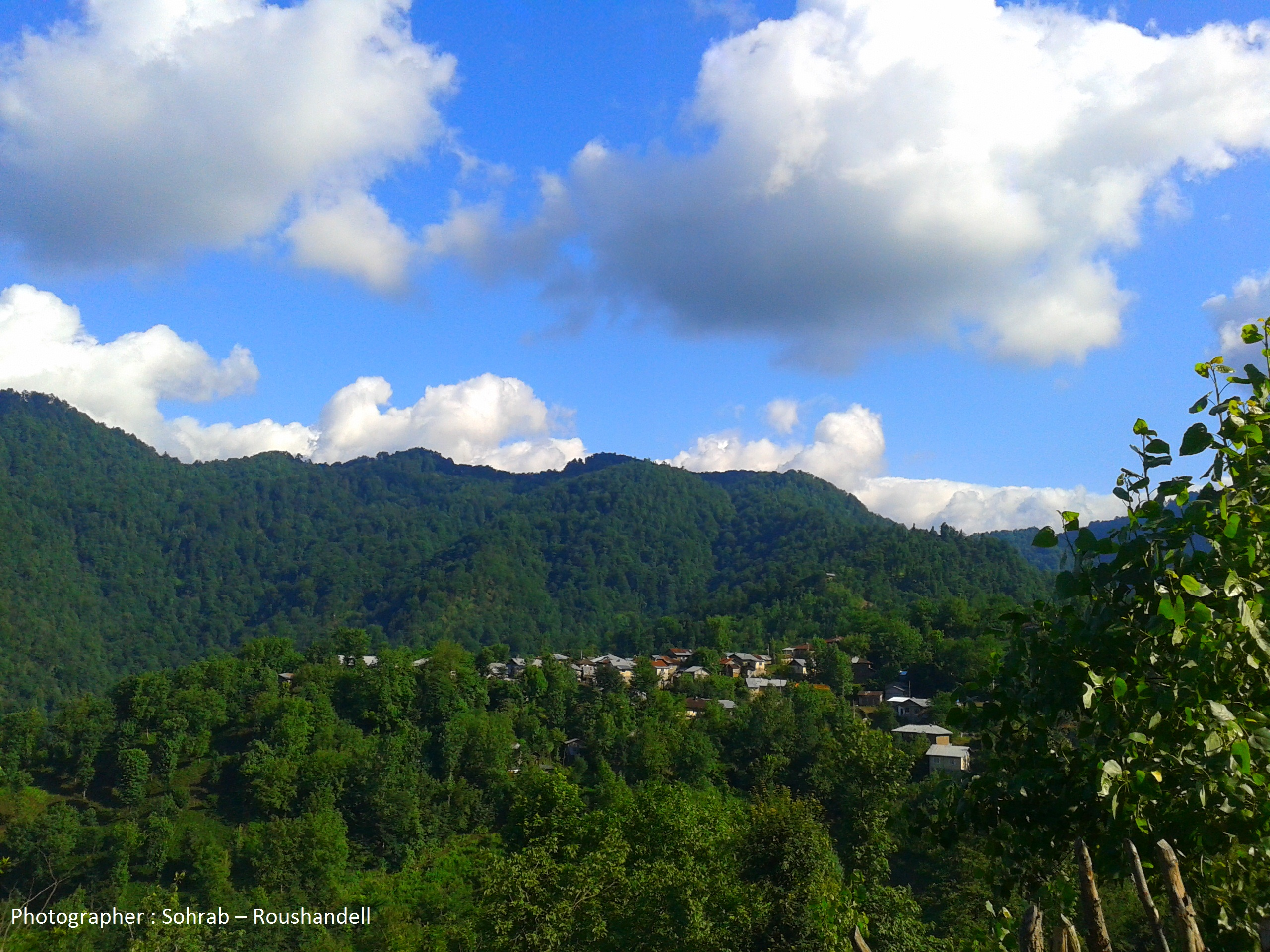
- The village of Tiksar

- Location within Iran
- Coordinates: 37°03′12″N 50°02′36″E
- Country: Iran
- Province: Gilan
- County: Langarud
- District: Otaqvar
- Rural District: Otaqvar

Population (2016)
  - Total: 213
- Time zone: UTC+3:30 (IRST)

Tiksar (Persian: تیک سر) (Note: Also romanized as Tīksar) is a village in Otaqvar Rural District (Note: Formerly Kumeleh Rural District) of Otaqvar District in Langarud County, Gilan province, Iran.

== Demographics ==
=== Population ===
At the time of the 2006 National Census, the village's population was 269 in 64 households. The following census in 2011 counted 236 people in 68 households. The 2016 census measured the population of the village as 213 people in 68 households.
