= Su Gavaber =

Su Gavaber or Su Gavabor (Persian: سوگوابر) may refer to:

- Su Gavaber, Langarud
- Su Gavabor, Rudsar
