= Kandsar-e Shekar Kesh =

Kandsar-e Shekar Kesh كند سر شكر كش
- Village
- Country: Iran
- Province: Gilan
- County: Langarud
- Bakhsh: Otaqvar
- Rural District: Otaqvar

Population (2006)
  - Total: 92
- Time zone: UTC+3:30 (IRST)
  - Summer (DST): UTC+4:30 (IRDT)

Kandsar-e Shekar Kesh (Persian: كند سر شكر كش) is a village in Otaqvar Rural District, Otaqvar District, Langarud County, Gilan Province, Iran. At the 2006 census, its population was 92, in 27 families.
