= Kal Chal =

Village in Gilan province, Iran

Kal Chal Persian: كل چال
- Village
- Location within Iran
- Coordinates: 37°03′03″N 50°06′06″E
- Country: Iran
- Province: Gilan
- County: Langarud
- District: Otaqvar
- Rural District: Lat Leyl

Population (2016)
  - Total: 160
- Time zone: UTC+3:30 (IRST)

Kal Chal (Persian: كل چال) (Note: Also romanized as Kal Chāl; also known as Golchāl) is a village in Lat Leyl Rural District of Otaqvar District in Langarud County, Gilan province, Iran.

== Demographics ==
=== Population ===
At the time of the 2006 National Census, the village's population was 140 in 35 households. The following census in 2011 counted 119 people in 33 households. The 2016 census measured the population of the village as 160 people in 53 households.
