= Porush, Iran =

Porush (Persian: پروش) in Iran may refer to:

- Porush-e Bala
- Porush-e Pain
