= Siah Manseh-ye Bala =

Village in Gilan province, Iran

Siah Manseh-ye Bala Persian: سیاه منسه بالا
- Village
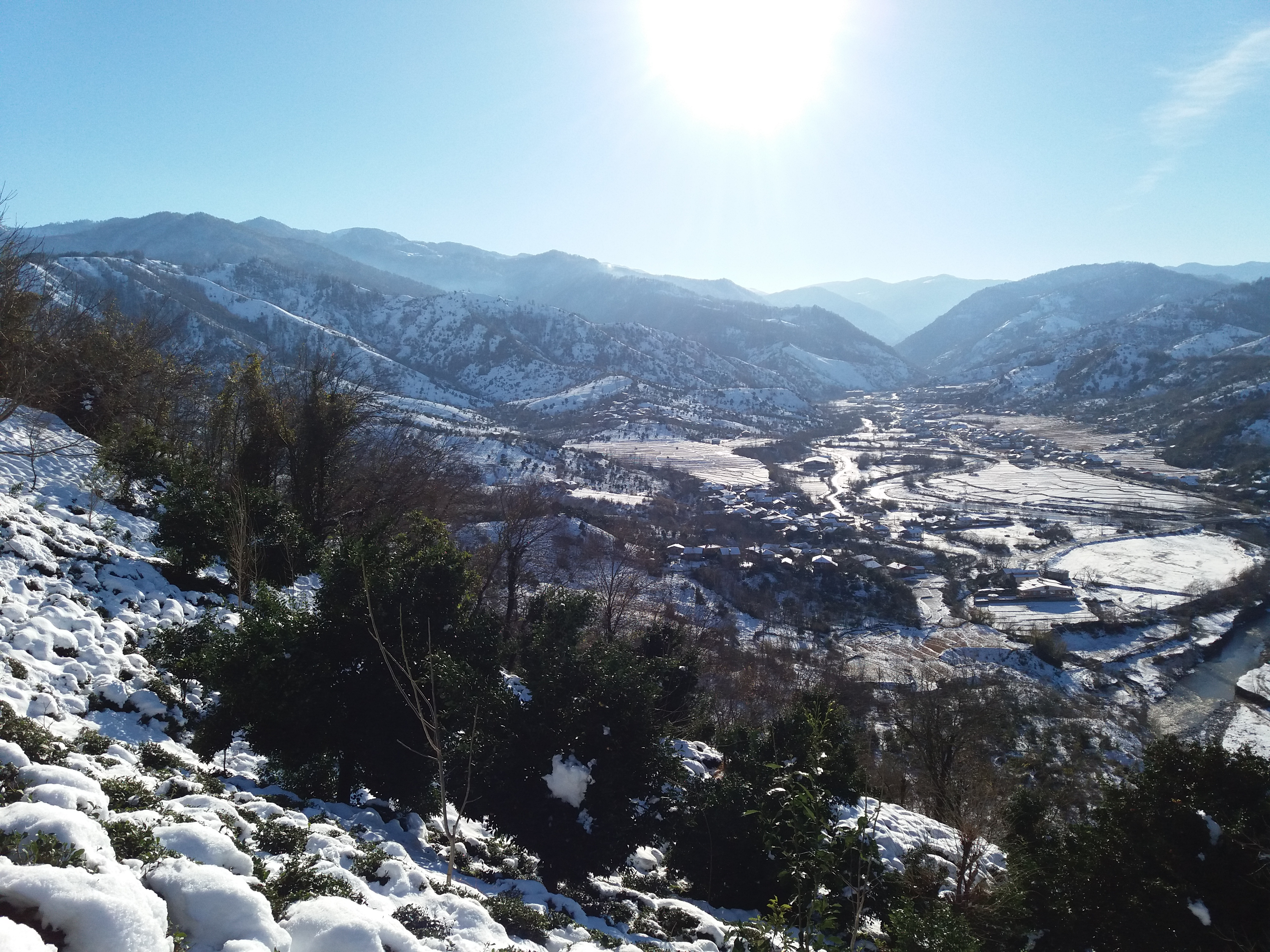
- Winter in Siah Manseh

- Location within Iran
- Coordinates: 37°04′14″N 50°08′21″E
- Country: Iran
- Province: Gilan
- County: Langarud
- District: Otaqvar
- Rural District: Lat Leyl

Population (2016)
  - Total: 169
- Time zone: UTC+3:30 (IRST)

Siah Manseh-ye Bala (Persian: سیاه منسه بالا) (Note: Also romanized as Sīāh Manseh-ye Bālā; also known as Seyāh Mūneseh, Sīāh Mūneseh, and Sīāh Mūnseh) is a village in Lat Leyl Rural District of Otaqvar District in Langarud County, Gilan province, Iran.

== Demographics ==
=== Population ===
At the time of the 2006 National Census, the village's population was 245 in 64 households. The following census in 2011 counted 167 people in 58 households. The 2016 census measured the population of the village as 169 people in 67 households.
