= Khalsar =

Khalsar may refer to:

- Khalsar, Leh, a village in Ladakh, India
- Khaleh Sar, a village in Gilan, Iran
