= Bala Shekar Kesh =

Village in Gilan province, Iran

Bala Shekar Kesh Persian: بالاشكركش
- Village
- Location within Iran
- Coordinates: 37°05′17″N 50°05′31″E
- Country: Iran
- Province: Gilan
- County: Langarud
- District: Otaqvar
- Rural District: Otaqvar

Population (2016)
  - Total: 261
- Time zone: UTC+3:30 (IRST)

Bala Shekar Kesh (Persian: بالاشكركش) (Note: Also romanized as Bālā Shekar Kesh; also known as Shekar Kesh and Shekar Kesh-e Bālā) is a village in Otaqvar Rural District (Note: Formerly Kumeleh Rural District) of Otaqvar District in Langarud County, Gilan province, Iran.

== Demographics ==
=== Population ===
At the time of the 2006 National Census, the village's population was 262 in 83 households. The following census in 2011 counted 274 people in 93 households. The 2016 census measured the population of the village as 261 people in 94 households.
