= Pish Kuh-e Pain =

Village in Gilan province, Iran

Pish Kuh-e Pain Persian: پيش كوه پايين
- Village
- Location within Iran
- Coordinates: 37°03′30″N 50°06′31″E
- Country: Iran
- Province: Gilan
- County: Langarud
- District: Otaqvar
- Rural District: Lat Leyl

Population (2016)
  - Total: 102
- Time zone: UTC+3:30 (IRST)

Pish Kuh-e Pain (Persian: پيش كوه پايين) (Note: Also romanized as Pīsh Kūh-e Pā’īn; also known as Pīshgūpāeen) is a village in Lat Leyl Rural District of Otaqvar District in Langarud County, Gilan province, Iran.

== Demographics ==
=== Population ===
At the time of the 2006 National Census, the village's population was 106 in 31 households. The following census in 2011 counted 88 people in 30 households. The 2016 census measured the population of the village as 102 people in 37 households.
