= Khaleh Sar =

Village in Gilan province, Iran

Khaleh Sar Persian: خاله سر
- Village
- Location within Iran
- Coordinates: 37°06′20″N 50°09′33″E
- Country: Iran
- Province: Gilan
- County: Langarud
- District: Otaqvar
- Rural District: Lat Leyl

Population (2016)
  - Total: 193
- Time zone: UTC+3:30 (IRST)

Khaleh Sar (Persian: خاله سر) (Note: Also romanized as Khāleh Sar, also known as Khālsar) is a village in Lat Leyl Rural District of Otaqvar District in Langarud County, Gilan province, Iran.

== Demographics ==
=== Population ===
At the time of the 2006 National Census, the village's population was 208 in 60 households. The following census in 2011 counted 199 people in 66 households. The 2016 census measured the population of the village as 193 people in 74 households.
