= Porush =

Porush may refer to:

== People ==
- Menachem Porush (1916–2010), Israeli politician
- Meir Porush, Israeli politician
- Shlomo Zalman Porush, Belarusian rabbi
- Danny Porush, American businessman and stock fraudster
- Israel Porush, Australian Rabbi

== Places ==
- Porush, Iran (disambiguation)
