= Porush-e Pain =

Village in Gilan province, Iran

Porush-e Pain Persian: پروش پائين
- Village
- Location within Iran
- Coordinates: 37°07′26″N 50°06′37″E
- Country: Iran
- Province: Gilan
- County: Langarud
- District: Otaqvar
- Rural District: Otaqvar

Population (2016)
  - Total: 375
- Time zone: UTC+3:30 (IRST)

Porush-e Pain (Persian: پروش پائين) (Note: Also romanized as Porūsh-e Pā’īn; also known as Porūsh) is a village in Otaqvar Rural District (Note: Formerly Kumeleh Rural District) of Otaqvar District in Langarud County, Gilan province, Iran.

== Demographics ==
=== Population ===
At the time of the 2006 National Census, the village's population was 488 in 130 households. The following census in 2011 counted 411 people in 133 households. The 2016 census measured the population of the village as 375 people in 135 households.
