= Siah Manseh-ye Pain =

Village in Gilan province, Iran

Siah Manseh-ye Pain Persian: سیاه منسه پائين
- Village
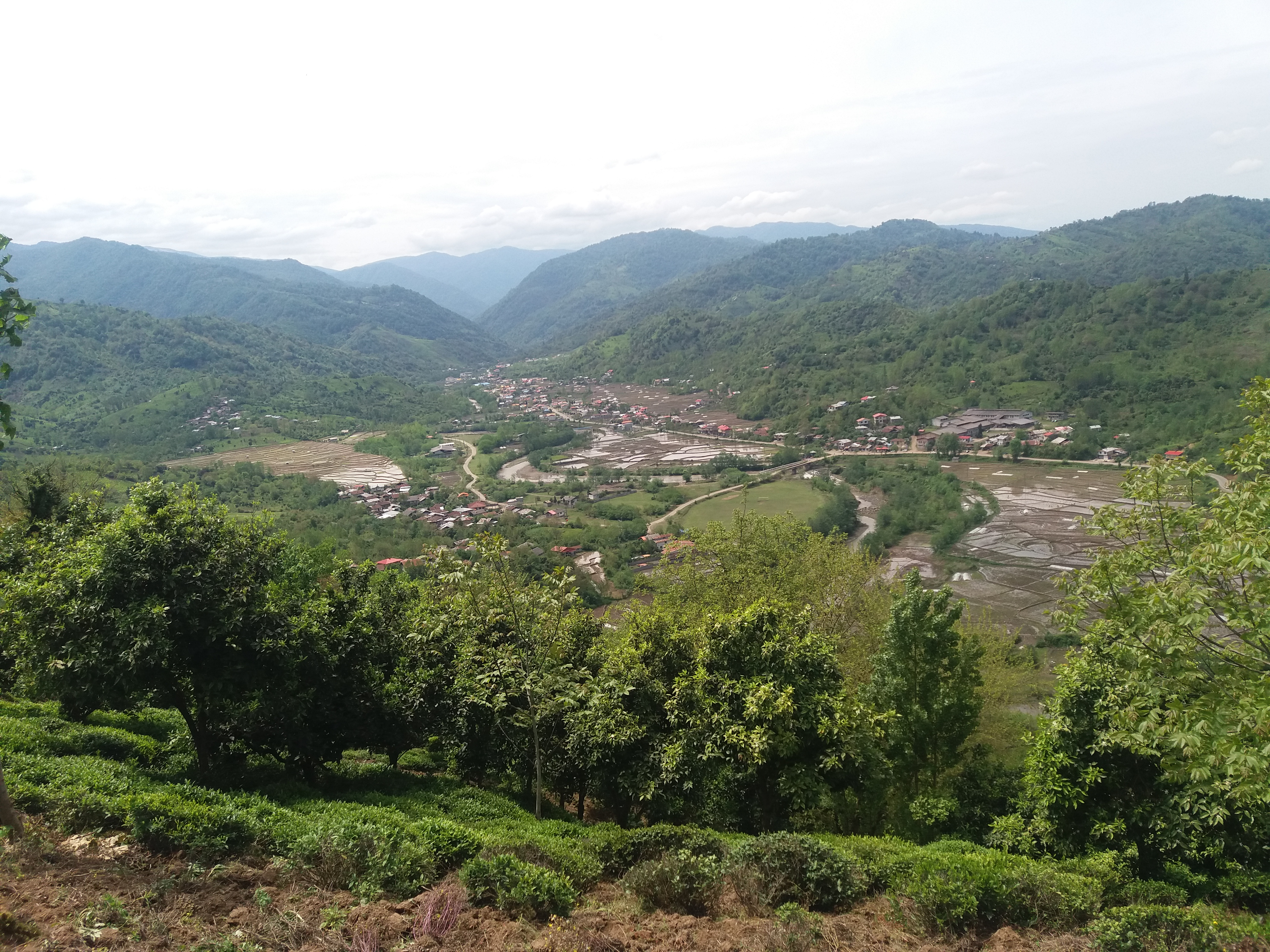
- Spring in Siah Manseh

- Location within Iran
- Coordinates: 37°04′41″N 50°08′35″E
- Country: Iran
- Province: Gilan
- County: Langarud
- District: Otaqvar
- Rural District: Lat Leyl

Population (2016)
  - Total: 222
- Time zone: UTC+3:30 (IRST)

Siah Manseh-ye Pain (Persian: سياه منسه پائين) (Note: Also romanized as Sīāh Manseh-ye Pā’īn; also known as Pā’īn Sīāh Mūneseh, Seyāh Mūneseh, Sīāh Mūneseh, and Sīāh Mūnseh) is a village in Lat Leyl Rural District of Otaqvar District in Langarud County, Gilan province, Iran.

== Demographics ==
=== Population ===
At the time of the 2006 National Census, the village's population was 329 in 85 households. The following census in 2011 counted 273 people in 83 households. The 2016 census measured the population of the village as 222 people in 81 households.
