= Otaqvar =

City in Gilan province, Iran

Otaqvar Persian: اطاقور
- City
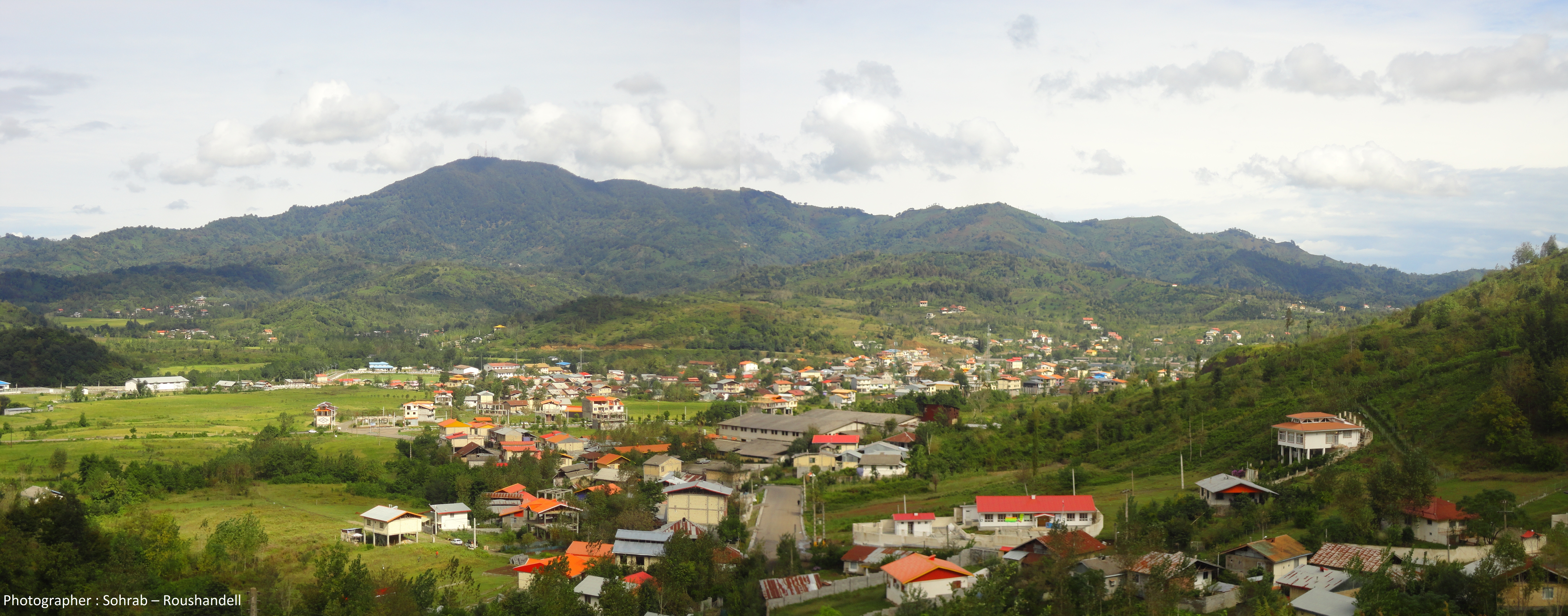

- Location within Iran
- Coordinates: 37°06′36″N 50°06′49″E
- Country: Iran
- Province: Gilan
- County: Langarud
- District: Otaqvar
- Established as a city: 2000

Population (2016)
  - Total: 1,938
- Time zone: UTC+3:30 (IRST)

Otaqvar (Persian: اطاقور) (Note: Also romanized as Oţāqvar) is a city in, and the capital of, Otaqvar District in Langarud County, Gilan province, Iran. It also serves as the administrative center for Otaqvar Rural District. (Note: Formerly Kumeleh Rural District) It is connected to four other cities in Gilan: Langarud, Lahijan, Rudsar and Amlash, and is 16 km from the sea. The village of Otaqvar was converted to a city in 2000.

== Demographics ==
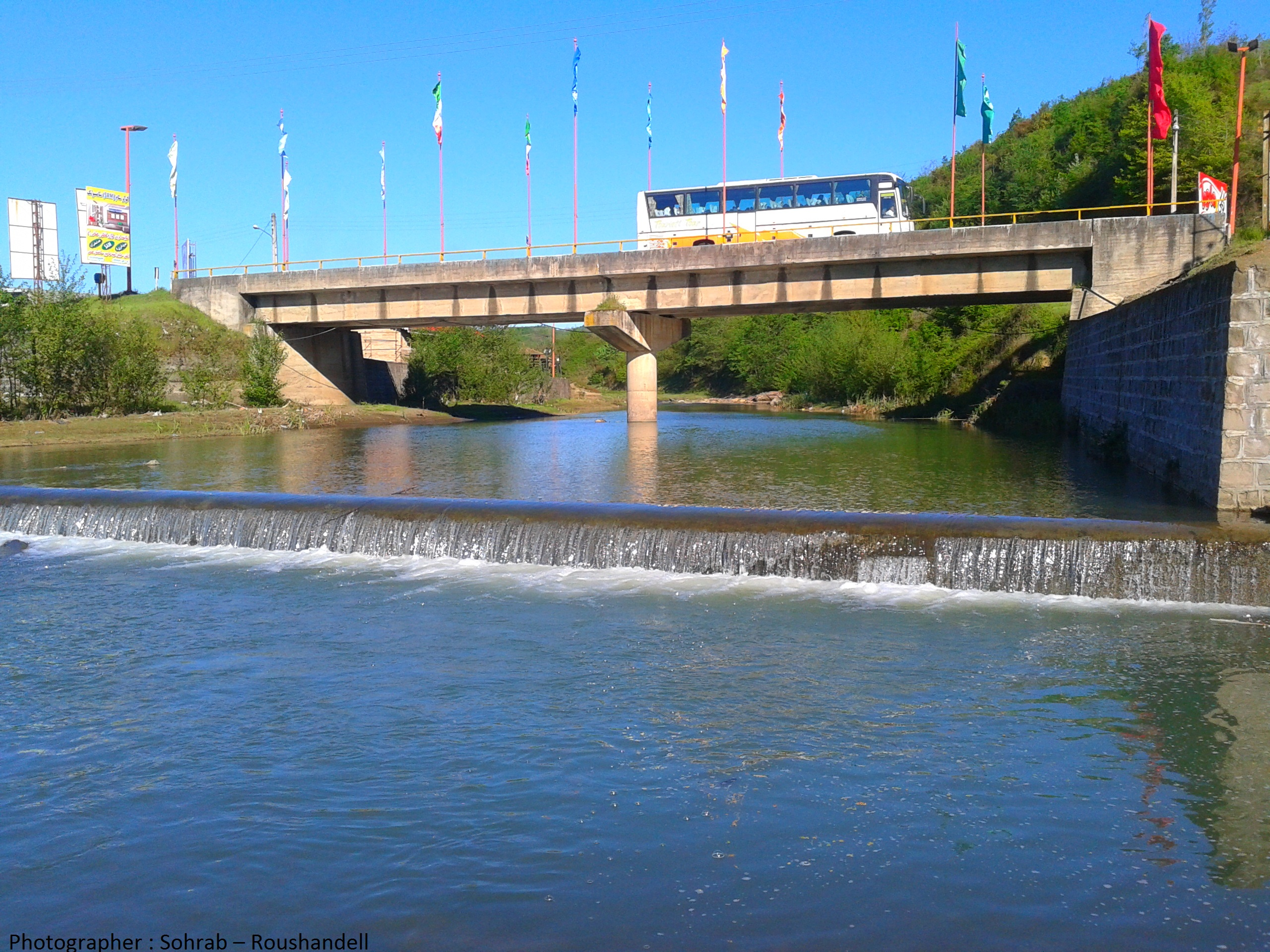
River in Otaqvar

=== Population ===
At the time of the 2006 National Census, the city's population was 1,404 in 418 households. The following census in 2011 counted 1,804 people in 540 households. The 2016 census measured the population of the city as 1,938 people in 662 households.
