= Pishkuh Rural District =

Pishkuh Rural District (Persian: دهستان پيشكوه) may refer to:

- Pishkuh Rural District (Qaen County), South Khorasan province
- Pishkuh Rural District (Taft County), Yazd province

== See also ==
- Pishkuh-e Mugui Rural District, in Isfahan province
- Pishkuh-e Zalaqi Rural District, in Lorestan province
