= Narenj Bon, Gilan =

Narenj Bon نارنج بن
- Village
- Location within Iran
- Coordinates: 37°04′27″N 50°12′35″E
- Country: Iran
- Province: Gilan
- County: Amlash
- Bakhsh: Central
- Rural District: Amlash-e Jonubi

Population (2006)
  - Total: 166
- Time zone: UTC+3:30 (IRST)
  - Summer (DST): UTC+4:30 (IRDT)

Narenj Bon (Persian: نارنج بن, also Romanized as Nārenj Bon; also known as Nārenjdarbon) is a village in Amlash-e Jonubi Rural District, in the Central District of Amlash County, Gilan Province, Iran. At the 2006 census, its population was 166, in 45 families.
