= Kand Sar, Chaboksar =

Kand Sar كندسر
- Village
- Location within Iran
- Coordinates: 36°58′00″N 50°34′00″E
- Country: Iran
- Province: Gilan
- County: Rudsar
- Bakhsh: Chaboksar
- Rural District: Owshiyan

Population (2006)
  - Total: 131
- Time zone: UTC+3:30 (IRST)
  - Summer (DST): UTC+4:30 (IRDT)

Kand Sar (Persian: كندسر) is a village in Owshiyan Rural District, Chaboksar District, Rudsar County, Gilan Province, Iran. At the 2006 census, its population was 131, in 35 families.
