= Lat Leyl Rural District =

Rural district in Gilan province, Iran

Lat Leyl Rural District Persian: دهستان لات ليل
- Rural District
- Location within Iran
- Coordinates: 37°02′N 50°04′E
- Country: Iran
- Province: Gilan
- County: Langarud
- District: Otaqvar
- Established: 1987
- Capital: Lat Leyl

Population (2016)
  - Total: 4,039
- Time zone: UTC+3:30 (IRST)

Lat Leyl Rural District (Persian: دهستان لات ليل) is in Otaqvar District of Langarud County, Gilan province, Iran. Its capital is the village of Lat Leyl.

== Demographics ==
=== Population ===
At the time of the 2006 National Census, the rural district's population was 5,119 in 1,356 households. There were 4,387 inhabitants in 1,368 households at the following census of 2011. The 2016 census measured the population of the rural district as 4,039 in 1,454 households. The most populous of its 48 villages was Lat Leyl, with 708 people.

=== Other villages in the rural district ===
- Abdangsar
- Bolur Dokan
- Chaharsu Poshteh
- Garsak-e Pain
- Kahlestan
- Kal Chal
- Khaleh Sar
- Pish Kuh-e Pain
- Sarleyleh
- Siah Manseh-ye Bala
- Siah Manseh-ye Pain
