= Otaqvar Rural District =

Rural district in Gilan province, Iran

Otaqvar Rural District Persian: دهستان اطاقور
- Rural District
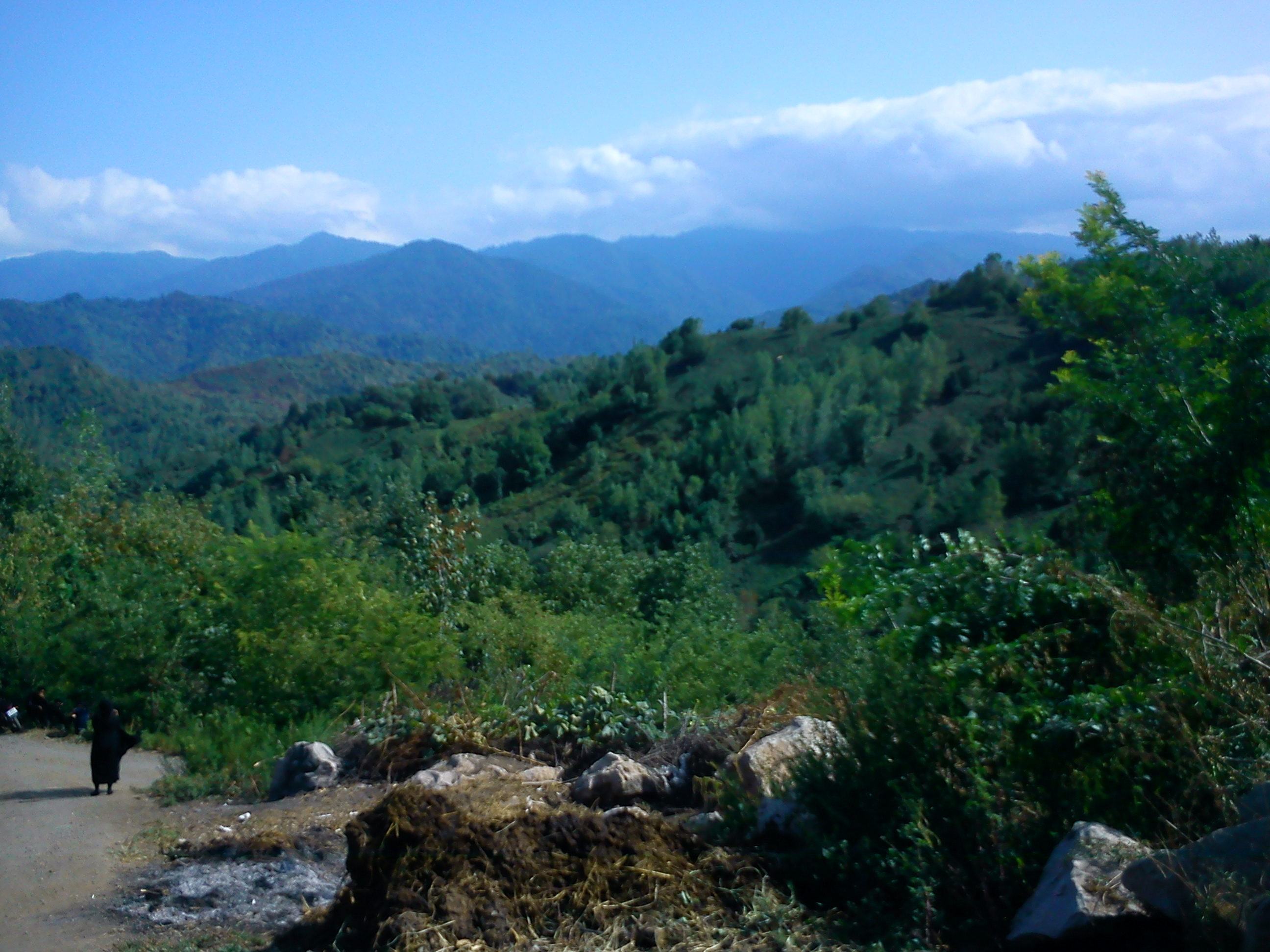
- Landscape of Otaqvar and Amlash

- Location within Iran
- Coordinates: 37°05′N 50°03′E
- Country: Iran
- Province: Gilan
- County: Langarud
- District: Otaqvar
- Established: 1987
- Capital: Otaqvar

Population (2016)
  - Total: 6,797
- Time zone: UTC+3:30 (IRST)

Otaqvar Rural District (Persian: دهستان اطاقور) (Note: Formerly Kumeleh Rural District (دهستان کومله)) is in Otaqvar District of Langarud County, Gilan province, Iran. It is administered from the city of Otaqvar.

== Demographics ==
=== Population ===
At the time of the 2006 National Census, the rural district's population was 8,487 in 2,314 households. There were 7,135 inhabitants in 2,260 households at the following census of 2011. The 2016 census measured the population of the rural district as 6,797 in 2,461 households. The most populous of its 96 villages was Kafsh Kal Mahalleh, with 471 people.

=== Other villages in the rural district ===
- Bala Shekar Kesh
- Liseh Rud-e Tazehabad
- Porush-e Pain
- Taleb Sara
- Tazehabad-e Kord Sara Kuh
- Tiksar
