= Langarud County =

County in Gilan province, Iran

Langarud County Persian: شهرستان لنگرود
- County
- Location of Langarud County in Gilan province (right, yellow)

- Location of Gilan province in Iran
- Coordinates: 37°07′N 50°09′E
- Country: Iran
- Province: Gilan
- Capital: Langarud
- Districts: Central, Kumeleh, Otaqvar

Population (2016)
  - Total: 140,686
- Time zone: UTC+3:30 (IRST)

Langarud County (Persian: شهرستان لنگرود) is in the northwestern Iranian province of Gilan. Its capital is the city of Langarud.

== History ==
In 2009, the village of Chaf-e Pain merged with several villages merged to form the new city of Chaf and Chamkhaleh.

== Demographics ==
=== Population ===
At the time of the 2006 census, the county's population was 133,133 in 38,597 households. The following census in 2011 counted 137,272 people in 44,344 households. The 2016 census measured the population of the county as 140,686 in 49,351 households.

=== Administrative divisions ===
Langarud County's population history and administrative structure over three consecutive censuses are shown in the following table.

Langarud County Population
Administrative Divisions	2006	2011	2016
Central District	90,729	99,021	103,282
Chaf RD	9,834	6,961	2,395
Divshal RD	10,179	10,313	10,261
Gel-e Sefid RD	5,347	2,776	2,341
Chaf and Chamkhaleh (city) (Note: Formerly the village of Chaf-e Pain)		4,494	8,840
Langarud (city)	65,369	74,477	79,445
Kumeleh District	27,394	24,925	24,630
Daryasar RD	10,508	8,264	8,638
Moridan RD	5,532	5,399	4,433
Kumeleh (city)	5,703	6,078	6,457
Shalman (city)	5,651	5,184	5,102
Otaqvar District	15,010	13,326	12,774
Lat Leyl RD	5,119	4,387	4,039
Otaqvar RD (Note: Formerly Kumeleh Rural District)	8,487	7,135	6,797
Otaqvar (city)	1,404	1,804	1,938
Total	133,133	137,272	140,686
RD = Rural District

== See also ==
Media related to Langarud County at Wikimedia Commons
