= Otaqvar District =

District in Gilan province, Iran

Otaqvar District Persian: بخش اطاقور
- District
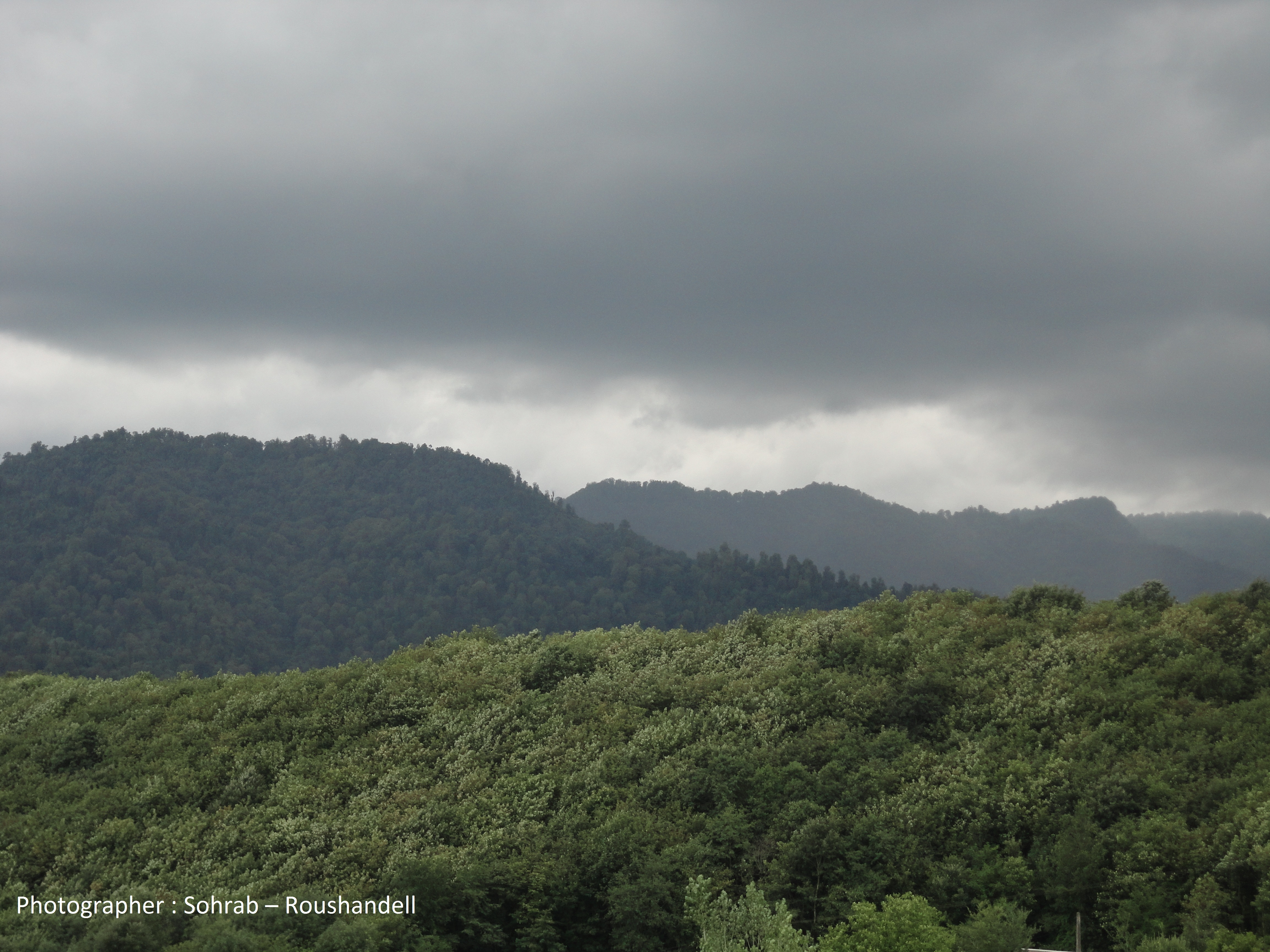
- Forests of Otaqvar

- Location within Iran
- Coordinates: 37°03′N 50°03′E
- Country: Iran
- Province: Gilan
- County: Langarud
- Established: 1996
- Capital: Otaqvar

Population (2016)
  - Total: 12,774
- Time zone: UTC+3:30 (IRST)

Otaqvar District (Persian: بخش اطاقور) is in Langarud County, Gilan province, Iran. Its capital is the city of Otaqvar.

== Demographics ==
=== Population ===
At the time of the 2006 National Census, the district's population was 15,010 in 4,088 households. The following census in 2011 counted 13,326 people in 4,168 households. The 2016 census measured the population of the district as 12,774 inhabitants in 4,577 households.

=== Administrative divisions ===
Otaqvar District Population
Administrative Divisions	2006	2011	2016
Lat Leyl RD	5,119	4,387	4,039
Otaqvar RD (Note: Formerly Kumeleh Rural District)	8,487	7,135	6,797
Otaqvar (city)	1,404	1,804	1,938
Total	15,010	13,326	12,774
RD = Rural District
