= Forshki-ye Chukam =

Village in Gilan province, Iran

Forshki-ye Chukam Persian: فرشکی چوكام
- Village
- Location within Iran
- Coordinates: 37°23′50″N 49°34′50″E
- Country: Iran
- Province: Gilan
- County: Khomam
- District: Chukam
- Rural District: Forshki

Population (2016)
  - Total: 1,000
- Time zone: UTC+3:30 (IRST)

Forshki-ye Chukam (Persian: فرشکی چوكام) (Note: Also romanized as Forshkī-ye Chūkām; also known as Forshkī) is a village in, and the capital of, Forshki Rural District in Chukam District of Khomam County, Gilan province, Iran.

== Demographics ==
=== Population ===
At the time of the 2006 National Census, the village's population was 1,198 in 344 households, when it was in Chukam Rural District (Note: Renamed Eshkik Rural District) of the former Khomam District in Rasht County. The following census in 2011 counted 1,194 people in 392 households. The 2016 census measured the population of the village as 1,000 people in 330 households.

In 2020, the district was separated from the county in the establishment of Khomam County. Forshki-ye Chukam was transferred to Forshki Rural District created in the new Chukam District.
