= Bijirud Kol =

Village in Gilan province, Iran

Bijirud Kol Persian: بيجرودكل
- Village
- Location within Iran
- Coordinates: 37°21′32″N 49°34′35″E
- Country: Iran
- Province: Gilan
- County: Khomam
- District: Chukam
- Rural District: Forshki

Population (2016)
  - Total: 310
- Time zone: UTC+3:30 (IRST)

Bijirud Kol (Persian: بيجرودكل) (Note: Also romanized as Bījīrūd Kol; also known as Bejīr Kol) is a village in Forshki Rural District of Chukam District in Khomam County, Gilan province, Iran.

== Demographics ==
=== Population ===
At the time of the 2006 National Census, the village's population was 326 in 90 households, when it was in Chukam Rural District (Note: Renamed Eshkik Rural District) of the former Khomam District in Rasht County. The following census in 2011 counted 273 people in 92 households. The 2016 census measured the population of the village as 310 people in 119 households.

In 2020, the district was separated from the county in the establishment of Khomam County. Bijirud Kol was transferred to Forshki Rural District created in the new Chukam District.
