= Mian Kol, Gilan =

Village in Gilan province, Iran

Mian Kol Persian: ميانكل
- Village
- Location within Iran
- Coordinates: 37°22′50″N 49°34′56″E
- Country: Iran
- Province: Gilan
- County: Khomam
- District: Chukam
- Rural District: Forshki

Population (2016)
  - Total: 153
- Time zone: UTC+3:30 (IRST)

Mian Kol (Persian: ميانكل) (Note: Also romanized as Mīān Kol) is a village in Forshki Rural District of Chukam District in Khomam County, Gilan province, Iran.

== Demographics ==
=== Population ===
At the time of the 2006 National Census, the village's population was 187 in 60 households, when it was in Chukam Rural District (Note: Renamed Eshkik Rural District) of the former Khomam District in Rasht County. The following census in 2011 counted 178 people in 62 households. The 2016 census measured the population of the village as 153 people in 61 households.

In 2020, the district was separated from the county in the establishment of Khomam County. Mian Kol was transferred to Forshki Rural District created in the new Chukam District.
