= Lalehka =

Village in Gilan province, Iran

Lalehka Persian: لله كا
- Village
- Location within Iran
- Coordinates: 37°21′47″N 49°37′29″E
- Country: Iran
- Province: Gilan
- County: Khomam
- District: Chukam
- Rural District: Forshki

Population (2016)
  - Total: 1,825
- Time zone: UTC+3:30 (IRST)

Lalehka (Persian: لَـلِه‌کا) (Note: Also known as Laleka and Pā’īn Maḩalleh-ye Leleh Kāh) is a village in Forshki Rural District of Chukam District in Khomam County, Gilan province, Iran.

== Demographics ==
=== Population ===
At the time of the 2006 National Census, the village's population was 1,869 in 525 households, when it was in Chukam Rural District (Note: Renamed Eshkik Rural District) of the former Khomam District in Rasht County. The following census in 2011 counted 1,871 people in 595 households. The 2016 census measured the population of the village as 1,825 people in 617 households.

In 2020, the district was separated from the county in the establishment of Khomam County. Lalehka was transferred to Forshki Rural District created in the new Chukam District.
