= Bij =

Village in Gilan province, Iran

Bij Persian: بيج
- Village
- Location within Iran
- Country: Iran
- Province: Gilan
- County: Khomam
- District: Chukam
- Rural District: Forshki

Population (2016)
  - Total: 375
- Time zone: UTC+3:30 (IRST)

Bij (Persian: بيج) (Note: Also romanized as Bidzh and Bīj) is a village in Forshki Rural District of Chukam District in Khomam County, Gilan province, Iran.

== Demographics ==
=== Population ===
At the time of the 2006 National Census, the village's population was 460 in 125 households, when it was in Chukam Rural District (Note: Renamed Eshkik Rural District) of the former Khomam District in Rasht County. The following census in 2011 counted 514 people in 168 households. The 2016 census measured the population of the village as 375 people in 128 households.

In 2020, the district was separated from the county in the establishment of Khomam County. Bij was transferred to Forshki Rural District created in the new Chukam District.
