= Kateh Sar =

Village in Gilan province, Iran

Kateh Sar Persian: كته‌سر
- Village
- Location within Iran
- Coordinates: 37°21′58″N 49°41′08″E
- Country: Iran
- Province: Gilan
- County: Khomam
- District: Central
- Rural District: Kateh Sar-e Khomam

Population (2016)
  - Total: 914
- Time zone: UTC+3:30 (IRST)

Kateh Sar (Persian: كته سر) (Note: Also known as Kateh Shūr and Katekhsar) is a village in, and the capital of, Kateh Sar-e Khomam Rural District in the Central District of Khomam County, Gilan province, in Iran.

== Demographics ==
=== Population ===
At the time of the 2006 National Census, the village's population was 981 in 312 households, when it was in the former Khomam District of Rasht County. The following census in 2011 counted 997 people in 338 households. The 2016 census measured the population of the village as 914 people in 327 households.

In 2020, the district was separated from the county in the establishment of Khomam County, and the rural district was transferred to the new Central District.
