= Meshka Posht =

Village in Gilan province, Iran

Meshka Posht Persian: مشكاپشت
- Village
- Location within Iran
- Coordinates: 37°21′18″N 49°43′00″E
- Country: Iran
- Province: Gilan
- County: Khomam
- District: Central
- Rural District: Kateh Sar-e Khomam

Population (2016)
  - Total: 141
- Time zone: UTC+3:30 (IRST)

Meshka Posht (Persian: مشكاپشت) (Note: Also romanized as Mashkā Posht and Meshkā Posht) is a village in Kateh Sar-e Khomam Rural District of the Central District in Khomam County, Gilan province, Iran.

== Demographics ==
=== Population ===
At the time of the 2006 National Census, the village's population was 235 in 80 households, when it was in the former Khomam District of Rasht County. The following census in 2011 counted 202 people in 73 households. The 2016 census measured the population of the village as 141 people in 57 households.

In 2020, the district was separated from the county in the establishment of Khomam County, and the rural district was transferred to the new Central District.
