= Gholamreza Bagh =

Village in Gilan province, Iran

Gholamreza Bagh Persian: غلامرضاباغ
- Village
- Location within Iran
- Coordinates: 37°24′00″N 49°38′54″E
- Country: Iran
- Province: Gilan
- County: Khomam
- District: Central
- Rural District: Chapar Khaneh

Population (2016)
  - Total: 174
- Time zone: UTC+3:30 (IRST)

Gholamreza Bagh (Persian: غلامرضاباغ) (Note: Also romanized as Gholāmreẕā Bāgh) is a village in Chapar Khaneh Rural District of the Central District in Khomam County, Gilan province, in Iran.

== Demographics ==
=== Population ===
At the time of the 2006 National Census, the village's population was 108 in 32 households, when it was in the former Khomam District of Rasht County. The following census in 2011 counted 108 people in 37 households. The 2016 census measured the population of the village as 174 people in 60 households.

In 2020, the district was separated from the county in the establishment of Khomam County, and the rural district was transferred to the new Central District.
