= Balaskaleh =

Village in Gilan province, Iran

Balaskaleh Persian: بلسكله
- Village
- Location within Iran
- Coordinates: 37°23′00″N 49°35′52″E
- Country: Iran
- Province: Gilan
- County: Khomam
- District: Chukam
- Rural District: Eshkik

Population (2016)
  - Total: 1,013
- Time zone: UTC+3:30 (IRST)

Balaskaleh (Persian: بلسكله) (Note: Also known as Balaskaleh-ye Chūkām) is a village in Eshkik Rural District (Note: Formerly Chukam Rural District) of Chukam District in Khomam County, Gilan province, Iran.

== Demographics ==
=== Population ===
At the time of the 2006 National Census, the village's population was 1,077 in 300 households, when it was in the former Khomam District of Rasht County. The following census in 2011 counted 944 people in 303 households. The 2016 census measured the population of the village as 1,013 people in 322 households.

In 2020, the district was separated from the county in the establishment of Khomam County, and the rural district was transferred to the new Chukam District.
