= Esmailabad, Gilan =

Village in Gilan province, Iran

Esmailabad Persian: اسماعيل اباد
- Village
- Location within Iran
- Country: Iran
- Province: Gilan
- County: Khomam
- District: Central
- Rural District: Kateh Sar-e Khomam

Population (2016)
  - Total: 37
- Time zone: UTC+3:30 (IRST)

Esmailabad (Persian: اسماعيل اباد) (Note: Also romanized as Esmā‘īlābād) is a village in Kateh Sar-e Khomam Rural District of the Central District in Khomam County, Gilan province, Iran.

== Demographics ==
=== Population ===
At the time of the 2006 National Census, the village's population was 57 in 14 households, when it was in the former Khomam District of Rasht County. The following census in 2011 counted 53 people in 12 households. The 2016 census measured the population of the village as 37 people in 12 households.

In 2020, the district was separated from the county in the establishment of Khomam County, and the rural district was transferred to the new Central District.
