= Sheyjan =

Village in Gilan province, Iran

Sheyjan Persian: شيجان
- Village
- Location within Iran
- Coordinates: 37°25′13″N 49°36′11″E
- Country: Iran
- Province: Gilan
- County: Khomam
- District: Central
- Rural District: Chapar Khaneh

Population (2016)
  - Total: 1,042
- Time zone: UTC+3:30 (IRST)

Sheyjan (Persian: شيجان) (Note: Also romanized as Shījān) is a village in Chapar Khaneh Rural District of the Central District in Khomam County, Gilan province, in Iran.

== Demographics ==
=== Population ===
At the time of the 2006 National Census, the village's population was 1,223 in 386 households, when it was in the former Khomam District of Rasht County. The following census in 2011 counted 1,133 people in 406 households. The 2016 census measured the population of the village as 1,042 people in 402 households.

In 2020, the district was separated from the county in the establishment of Khomam County, and the rural district was transferred to the new Central District.
