= Tisiyeh =

Village in Gilan province, Iran

Tisiyeh Persian: تیسیه
- Village
- Location within Iran
- Coordinates: 37°23′33″N 49°42′20″E
- Country: Iran
- Province: Gilan
- County: Khomam
- District: Central
- Rural District: Kateh Sar-e Khomam

Population (2016)
  - Total: 1,688
- Time zone: UTC+3:30 (IRST)

Tisiyeh (Persian: تیسیه) (Note: Also romanized as Tīsīyeh; also known as Tasīyeh, Teseyeh, and Tesīh) is a village in Kateh Sar-e Khomam Rural District of the Central District in Khomam County, Gilan province, Iran.

== Demographics ==
=== Population ===
At the time of the 2006 National Census, the village's population was 1,721 in 521 households, when it was in the former Khomam District of Rasht County. The following census in 2011 counted 1,753 people in 605 households. The 2016 census measured the population of the village as 1,688 people in 611 households.

In 2020, the district was separated from the county in the establishment of Khomam County, and the rural district was transferred to the new Central District.
