= Eshmenan Talem =

Village in Gilan province, Iran

Eshmenan Talem Persian: اشمنانطالم
- Village
- Location within Iran
- Coordinates: 37°20′27″N 49°42′22″E
- Country: Iran
- Province: Gilan
- County: Khomam
- District: Central
- Rural District: Kateh Sar-e Khomam

Population (2016)
  - Total: 679
- Time zone: UTC+3:30 (IRST)

Eshmenan Talem (Persian: اشمنانطالم) (Note: Also romanized as Eshmenān Ţālem; also known as Eshmenānz̧ālem) is a village in Kateh Sar-e Khomam Rural District of the Central District in Khomam County, Gilan province, Iran.

== Demographics ==
=== Population ===
At the time of the 2006 National Census, the village's population was 848 in 219 households, when it was in the former Khomam District of Rasht County. The following census in 2011 counted 747 people in 249 households. The 2016 census measured the population of the village as 679 people in 234 households.

In 2020, the district was separated from the county in the establishment of Khomam County, and the rural district was transferred to the new Central District.
