= Fatatu =

Village in Gilan province, Iran

Fatatu Persian: فتاتو
- Village
- Location within Iran
- Coordinates: 37°25′10″N 49°40′11″E
- Country: Iran
- Province: Gilan
- County: Khomam
- District: Central
- Rural District: Chapar Khaneh

Population (2016)
  - Total: 861
- Time zone: UTC+3:30 (IRST)

Fatatu (Persian: فتاتو) (Note: Also romanized as Fatātū) is a village in Chapar Khaneh Rural District of the Central District in Khomam County, Gilan province, in Iran.

== Demographics ==
=== Population ===
At the time of the 2006 National Census, the village's population was 913 in 234 households, when it was in the former Khomam District of Rasht County. The following census in 2011 counted 892 people in 271 households. The 2016 census measured the population of the village as 861 people in 306 households.

In 2020, the district was separated from the county in the establishment of Khomam County, and the rural district was transferred to the new Central District.
