= Lat, Khomam =

Village in Gilan province, Iran

Lat Persian: لات
- Village
- Location within Iran
- Coordinates: 37°22′18″N 49°42′03″E
- Country: Iran
- Province: Gilan
- County: Khomam
- District: Central
- Rural District: Kateh Sar-e Khomam

Population (2016)
  - Total: 837
- Time zone: UTC+3:30 (IRST)

Lat (Persian: لات) (Note: Also romanized as Lāt; also known as Lāt-e Kateh Sar) is a village in Kateh Sar-e Khomam Rural District of the Central District in Khomam County, Gilan province, Iran.

== Demographics ==
=== Population ===
At the time of the 2006 National Census, the village's population was 830 in 244 households, when it was in the former Khomam District of Rasht County. The following census in 2011 counted 851 people in 278 households. The 2016 census measured the population of the village as 837 people in 306 households.

In 2020, the district was separated from the county in the establishment of Khomam County, and the rural district was transferred to the new Central District.
