= Kalachah =

Village in Gilan province, Iran

Kalachah Persian: كلاچاه
- Village
- Location within Iran
- Coordinates: 37°22′09″N 49°42′19″E
- Country: Iran
- Province: Gilan
- County: Khomam
- District: Central
- Rural District: Kateh Sar-e Khomam

Population (2016)
  - Total: 1,926
- Time zone: UTC+3:30 (IRST)

Kalachah (Persian: كلاچاه) (Note: Also romanized as Kalāchāh) is a village in Kateh Sar-e Khomam Rural District of the Central District in Khomam County, Gilan province, Iran.

== Demographics ==
=== Population ===
At the time of the 2006 National Census, the village's population was 2,362 in 678 households, when it was in the former Khomam District of Rasht County. The following census in 2011 counted 2,272 people in 723 households. The 2016 census measured the population of the village as 1,926 people in 676 households. It was the most populous village in its rural district.

In 2020, the district was separated from the county in the establishment of Khomam County, and the rural district was transferred to the new Central District.
