= Naser Kiadeh =

Naser Kiadeh (Persian: ناصركياده) may refer to:

- Bala Mahalleh-ye Naser Kiadeh
- Naser Kiadeh-ye Mian Mahalleh
- Pain Mahalleh-ye Naser Kiadeh
