= Jefrud-e Bala =

Village in Gilan province, Iran

Jefrud-e Bala Persian: جفرودبالا
- Village
- Location within Iran
- Coordinates: 37°26′42″N 49°41′36″E
- Country: Iran
- Province: Gilan
- County: Khomam
- District: Central
- Rural District: Chapar Khaneh

Population (2016)
  - Total: 315
- Time zone: UTC+3:30 (IRST)

Jefrud-e Bala (Persian: جفرودبالا) (Note: Also romanized as Jefrūd-e Bālā; also known as Dzhufru, Jafrūd, Jefrūd, Jīfrūd, Jufru, and Jufrūd) is a village in Chapar Khaneh Rural District of the Central District in Khomam County, Gilan province, in Iran.

== Demographics ==
=== Population ===
At the time of the 2006 National Census, the village's population was 366 in 119 households, when it was in the former Khomam District of Rasht County. The following census in 2011 counted 347 people in 117 households. The 2016 census measured the population of the village as 315 people in 118 households.

In 2020, the district was separated from the county in the establishment of Khomam County, and the rural district was transferred to the new Central District.
