= Tukesar-e Sheyjan =

Village in Gilan province, Iran

Tukesar-e Sheyjan Persian: توكسرشيجان
- Village
- Location within Iran
- Coordinates: 37°25′52″N 49°35′58″E
- Country: Iran
- Province: Gilan
- County: Khomam
- District: Central
- Rural District: Chapar Khaneh

Population (2016)
  - Total: 127
- Time zone: UTC+3:30 (IRST)

Tukesar-e Sheyjan (Persian: توكسرشيجان) (Note: Also romanized as Tūkesar-e Sheyjān and Tūksar-e Shījān; also known as Nūksar and Sheyjān) is a village in Chapar Khaneh Rural District of the Central District in Khomam County, Gilan province, in Iran.

== Demographics ==
=== Population ===
At the time of the 2006 National Census, the village's population was 187 in 73 households, when it was in the former Khomam District of Rasht County. The following census in 2011 counted 154 people in 54 households. The 2016 census measured the population of the village as 127 people in 50 households.

In 2020, the district was separated from the county in the establishment of Khomam County, and the rural district was transferred to the new Central District.
