= Zir Deh, Khomam =

Village in Gilan province, Iran

Zir Deh Persian: زيرده
- Village
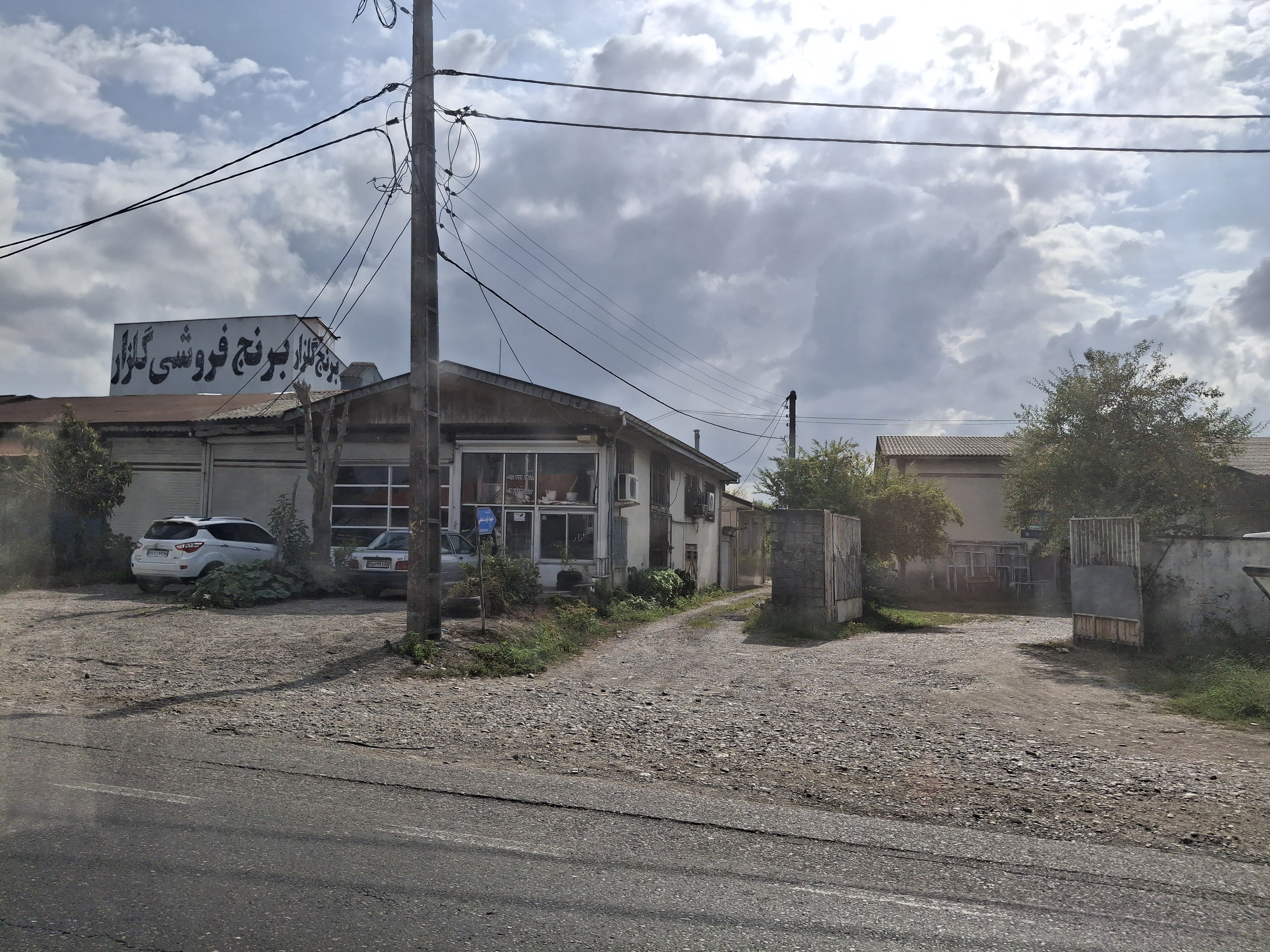
- The village of Zir Deh

- Location within Iran
- Coordinates: 37°24′18″N 49°39′36″E
- Country: Iran
- Province: Gilan
- County: Khomam
- District: Central
- Rural District: Chapar Khaneh

Population (2016)
  - Total: 30
- Time zone: UTC+3:30 (IRST)

Zir Deh (Persian: زيرده) (Note: Also romanized as Zīr Deh) is a village in Chapar Khaneh Rural District of the Central District in Khomam County, Gilan province, in Iran.

== Demographics ==
=== Population ===
At the time of the 2006 National Census, the village's population was 414 in 121 households, when it was in the former Khomam District of Rasht County. The following census in 2011 counted 172 people in 58 households. The 2016 census measured the population of the village as 30 people in 11 households.

In 2020, the district was separated from the county in the establishment of Khomam County, and the rural district was transferred to the new Central District.
