= Tazehabad-e Khachekin =

Village in Gilan province, Iran

Tazehabad-e Khachekin Persian: تازه ابادخاچكين
- Village
- Location within Iran
- Coordinates: 37°22′44″N 49°38′18″E
- Country: Iran
- Province: Gilan
- County: Khomam
- District: Chukam
- Rural District: Eshkik

Population (2016)
  - Total: 566
- Time zone: UTC+3:30 (IRST)

Tazehabad-e Khachekin (Persian: تازه ابادخاچكين) (Note: Also romanized as Tāzehābād-e Khāchekīn and Tāzehābād-e Khvāchekīn; also known as Tāzehābād) is a village in Eshkik Rural District (Note: Formerly Chukam Rural District) of Chukam District in Khomam County, Gilan province, Iran.

== Demographics ==
=== Population ===
At the time of the 2006 National Census, the village's population was 1,146 in 322 households, when it was in the former Khomam District of Rasht County. The following census in 2011 counted 681 people in 221 households. The 2016 census measured the population of the village as 566 people in 204 households.

In 2020, the district was separated from the county in the establishment of Khomam County, and the rural district was transferred to the new Chukam District.
