= Poshtsan-e Gurab Jir =

Village in Gilan province, Iran

Poshtsan-e Gurab Jir Persian: پشتستان گورابجير
- Village
- Location within Iran
- Coordinates: 37°24′53″N 49°39′06″E
- Country: Iran
- Province: Gilan
- County: Khomam
- District: Central
- Rural District: Chapar Khaneh

Population (2016)
  - Total: 279
- Time zone: UTC+3:30 (IRST)

Poshtsan-e Gurab Jir (Persian: پشتستان گورابجير) (Note: Also romanized as Poshtsān-e Gūr Āb Jīr and Poshtsān-e Gūrābjīr; also known as Poshtsān) is a village in Chapar Khaneh Rural District of the Central District in Khomam County, Gilan province, in Iran.

== Demographics ==
=== Population ===
At the time of the 2006 National Census, the village's population was 345 in 100 households, when it was in the former Khomam District of Rasht County. The following census in 2011 counted 285 people in 92 households. The 2016 census measured the population of the village as 279 people in 104 households.

In 2020, the district was separated from the county in the establishment of Khomam County, and the rural district was transferred to the new Central District.
