= Khachekin =

Village in Gilan province, Iran

Khachekin Persian: خاچكين
- Village
- Location within Iran
- Coordinates: 37°22′41″N 49°38′59″E
- Country: Iran
- Province: Gilan
- County: Khomam
- District: Chukam
- Rural District: Eshkik

Population (2016)
  - Total: 1,216
- Time zone: UTC+3:30 (IRST)

Khachekin (Persian: خاچكين) (Note: Also romanized as Khāchekīn and Khvāchekīn; also known as Hājkīn, Khadzhakhkin, Khājīkīn, Khājkīn, Khavaj Kin, Khvājeh Kheyr, Khvājgīn, and Khvājkīn) is a village in Eshkik Rural District (Note: Formerly Chukam Rural District) of Chukam District in Khomam County, Gilan province, Iran.

== Demographics ==
=== Population ===
At the time of the 2006 National Census, the village's population was 1,824 in 524 households, when it was in the former Khomam District of Rasht County. The following census in 2011 counted 1,161 people in 386 households. The 2016 census measured the population of the village as 1,216 people in 435 households.

In 2020, the district was separated from the county in the establishment of Khomam County, and the rural district was transferred to the new Chukam District.
