= Shad Dehsar =

Village in Gilan province, Iran

Shad Dehsar Persian: شاددهسر
- Village
- Location within Iran
- Coordinates: 37°13′56″N 50°00′13″E
- Country: Iran
- Province: Gilan
- County: Lahijan
- District: Central
- Rural District: Layalestan

Population (2016)
  - Total: 359
- Time zone: UTC+3:30 (IRST)

Shad Dehsar (Persian: شاددهسر) (Note: Also romanized as Shād Dehsar; also known as Shādehsar) is a village in Layalestan Rural District of the Central District in Lahijan County, Gilan province, Iran. The village is located north of Lahijan's city limits, near the road between the Lahijan and Rudboneh.

== Demographics ==
=== Population ===
At the time of the 2006 National Census, the village's population was 802 in 229 households, when it was in Rudboneh Rural District of Rudboneh District. The following census in 2011 counted 808 people in 256 households, by which time the village had been transferred to Layalestan Rural District of the Central District. The 2016 census measured the population of the village as 359 people in 126 households.
