= Kevisha =

Village in Gilan province, Iran

Kevisha Persian: كويشا
- Village
- Location within Iran
- Coordinates: 37°24′39″N 49°41′27″E
- Country: Iran
- Province: Gilan
- County: Khomam
- District: Central
- Rural District: Kateh Sar-e Khomam

Population (2016)
  - Total: 949
- Time zone: UTC+3:30 (IRST)

Kevisha (Persian: كويشا) (Note: Formerly known as Kevishad (كويشاد), also romanized as Kevīshād; also known as Kevīshāh) is a village in Kateh Sar-e Khomam Rural District of the Central District in Khomam County, Gilan province, Iran.

== Demographics ==
=== Population ===
At the time of the 2006 National Census, the village's population was 1,021 in 295 households, when it was in the former Khomam District of Rasht County. The following census in 2011 counted 1,054 people in 343 households. The 2016 census measured the population of the village as 949 people in 317 households.

In 2020, the district was separated from the county in the establishment of Kevisha.
