= Gurab Jir =

Village in Gilan province, Iran

Gurab Jir Persian: گوراب‌جير
- Village
- Location within Iran
- Coordinates: 37°26′17″N 49°38′20″E
- Country: Iran
- Province: Gilan
- County: Khomam
- District: Central
- Rural District: Chapar Khaneh

Population (2016)
  - Total: 1,507
- Time zone: UTC+3:30 (IRST)

Gurab jir (Persian: گوراب‌جير) (Note: Also romanized as Goorab Jir; also known as Gūrābjīr-e Sahrā; Gilaki: گۊراب‌جير) is a village in Chapar Khaneh Rural District of the Central District in Khomam County, Gilan province, in Iran.

== Demographics ==
=== Population ===
At the time of the 2006 National Census, the village's population was 1,698 in 531 households, when it was in the former Khomam District of Rasht County. The following census in 2011 counted 1,772 people in 597 households. The 2016 census measured the population of the village as 1,507 people in 547 households.

In 2020, the district was separated from the county in the establishment of Khomam County, and the rural district was transferred to the new Central District.
