= Eshkik =

Village in Gilan province, Iran

Eshkik Persian: اشکیک
- Village
- Location within Iran
- Coordinates: 37°21′23″N 49°38′24″E
- Country: Iran
- Province: Gilan
- County: Khomam
- District: Chukam
- Rural District: Eshkik

Population (2016)
  - Total: 1,451
- Time zone: UTC+3:30 (IRST)

Eshkik (Persian: اشکیک) (Note: Also romanized as Ashkīk and Eshkīk; also known as Ishkik) is a village in, and the capital of, Eshkik Rural District (Note: Formerly Chukam Rural District) in Chukam District of Khomam County, Gilan province, Iran. The previous capital of the rural district was the village of Bala Mahalleh-ye Chukam, now the city of Chukam.

== Demographics ==
=== Population ===
At the time of the 2006 National Census, the village's population was 1,905 in 528 households, when it was in the former Khomam District of Rasht County. The following census in 2011 counted 1,505 people in 491 households. The 2016 census measured the population of the village as 1,451 people in 502 households.

In 2020, the district was separated from the county in the establishment of Khomam County, and the rural district was transferred to the new Chukam District.
