= Jirsar-e Chukam =

Village in Gilan province, Iran

Jirsar-e Chukam Persian: جيرسرچوكام
- Village
- Location within Iran
- Coordinates: 37°24′28″N 49°35′19″E
- Country: Iran
- Province: Gilan
- County: Khomam
- District: Chukam
- Rural District: Forshki

Population (2016)
  - Total: 1,078
- Time zone: UTC+3:30 (IRST)

Jirsar-e Chukam (Persian: جيرسرچوكام) (Note: Also romanized as Jīrsar-e Chūkām) is a village in Forshki Rural District of Chukam District in Khomam County, Gilan province, Iran.

== Demographics ==
=== Population ===
At the time of the 2006 National Census, the village's population was 1,392 in 380 households, when it was in Chukam Rural District (Note: Renamed Eshkik Rural District) of the former Khomam District in Rasht County. The following census in 2011 counted 1,368 people in 422 households. The 2016 census measured the population of the village as 1,078 people in 347 households.

In 2020, the district was separated from the county in the establishment of Khomam County. Jirsar-e Chukam was transferred to Forshki Rural District created in the new Chukam District.
