= Shirju Posht =

Shirju Posht (Persian: شيرجوپشت) may refer to:

- Shirju Posht-e Bala
- Shirju Posht-e Pain
- Shirju Posht Rural District
