= Mian Mahalleh =

Mian Mahalleh (Persian: ميان محله) may refer to several places in Iran:

- Mian Mahalleh, Gilan, a village in Khomam County, Gilan province
- Mian Mahalleh-ye Sheyjan, a village in Khomam County, Gilan province
- Mian Mahalleh-ye Chaf Gavieh, a village in Lahijan County, Gilan province
- Mian Mahalleh-ye Golrudbar, a village in Lahijan County, Gilan province
- Mian Mahalleh-ye Rudbaneh, a village in Lahijan County, Gilan province
- Mian Mahalleh-ye Zakleh Bar, a village in Lahijan County, Gilan province
- Mian Mahalleh-ye Pap Kiadeh, a village in Langarud County, Gilan province
- Mian Mahalleh-ye Gafsheh, a village in Rasht County, Gilan province
- Mian Mahalleh, Mazandaran, a village in Amol County, Mazandaran province
