= Zarang Mahalleh =

Village in Gilan province, Iran

Zarang Mahalleh Persian: زرنگ محله
- Village
- Country: Iran
- Province: Gilan
- County: Khomam
- District: Central
- Rural District: Chapar Khaneh

Population (2016)
  - Total: 422
- Time zone: UTC+3:30 (IRST)

Zarang Mahalleh (Persian: زرنگ محله) (Note: Also romanized as Zarang Maḩalleh) is a village in Chapar Khaneh Rural District of the Central District in Khomam County, Gilan province, in Iran.

== Demographics ==
=== Population ===
At the time of the 2006 National Census, the village's population was 485 in 133 households, when it was in the former Khomam District of Rasht County. The following census in 2011 counted 445 people in 141 households. The 2016 census measured the population of the village as 422 people in 153 households.

In 2020, the district was separated from the county in the establishment of Khomam County, and the rural district was transferred to the new Central District.
