= Mesr Dasht =

Village in Gilan province, Iran

Mesr Dasht Persian: مصردشت
- Village
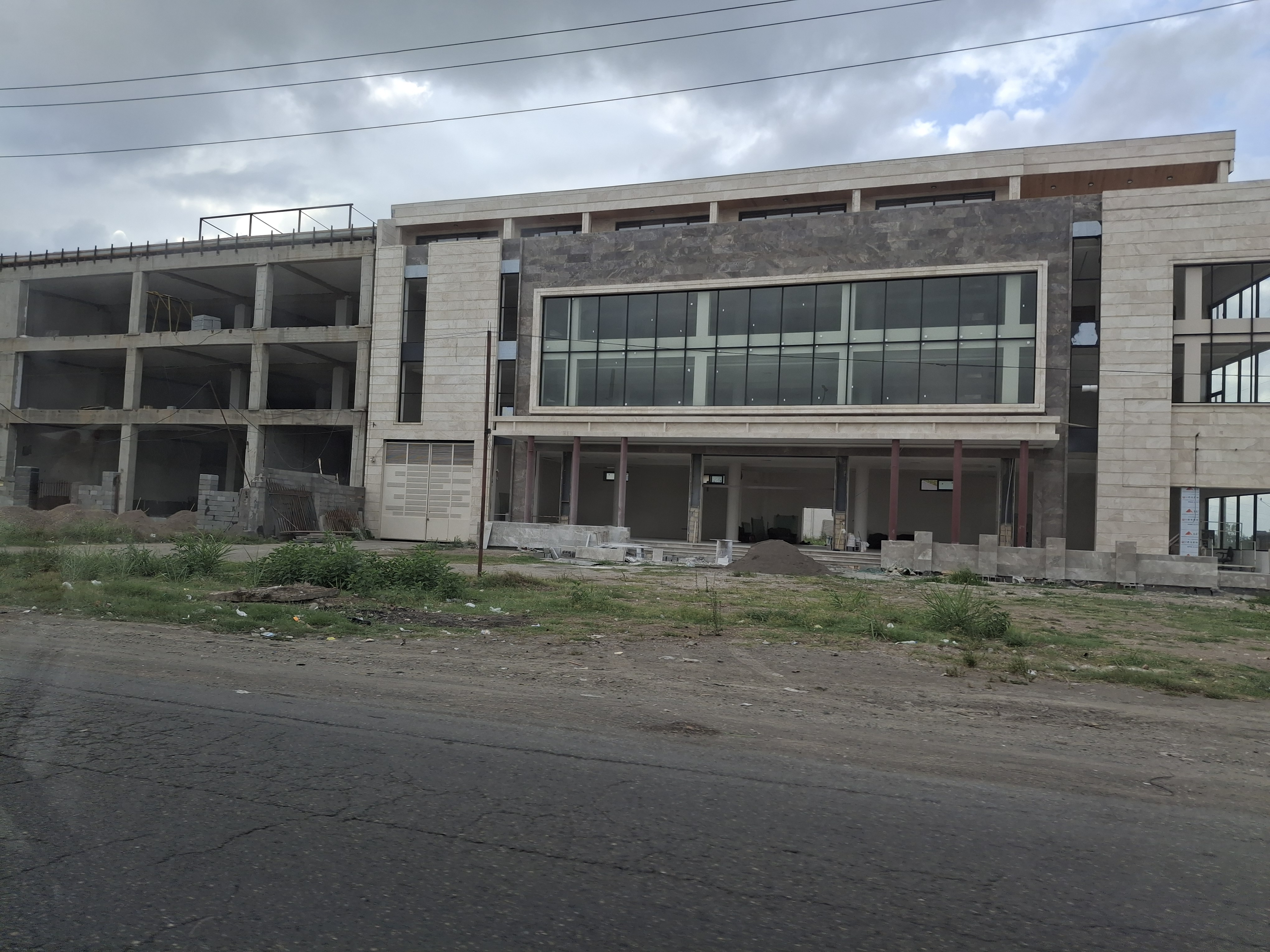
- Building under construction, Rasht–Anzali Road

- Location within Iran
- Coordinates: 37°21′09″N 49°37′56″E
- Country: Iran
- Province: Gilan
- County: Khomam
- District: Chukam
- Rural District: Eshkik

Population (2016)
  - Total: 557
- Time zone: UTC+3:30 (IRST)

Mesr Dasht (Persian: مصردشت) (Note: Also romanized as Maşar Dasht and Meşr Dasht) is a village in Eshkik Rural District (Note: Formerly Chukam Rural District) of Chukam District in Khomam County, Gilan province, Iran.

== Demographics ==
=== Population ===
At the time of the 2006 National Census, the village's population was 614 in 174 households, when it was in the former Khomam District of Rasht County. The following census in 2011 counted 663 people in 201 households. The 2016 census measured the population of the village as 557 people in 188 households.

In 2020, the district was separated from the county in the establishment of Khomam County, and the rural district was transferred to the new Chukam District.
