= Tazehabad-e Sadar =

Village in Gilan province, Iran

Tazehabad-e Sadar Persian: تازه ابادصدر
- Village
- Location within Iran
- Coordinates: 37°24′17″N 49°40′48″E
- Country: Iran
- Province: Gilan
- County: Khomam
- District: Central
- Rural District: Chapar Khaneh

Population (2016)
  - Total: 101
- Time zone: UTC+3:30 (IRST)

Tazehabad-e Sadar (Persian: تازه ابادصدر) (Note: Also romanized as Tāzehābād-e Şadar; also known as Tāzehābād) is a village in Chapar Khaneh Rural District of the Central District in Khomam County, Gilan province, in Iran.

== Demographics ==
=== Population ===
At the time of the 2006 National Census, the village's population was 106 in 29 households, when it was in the former Khomam District of Rasht County. The following census in 2011 counted 94 people in 33 households. The 2016 census measured the population of the village as 101 people in 38 households.

In 2020, the district was separated from the county in the establishment of Khomam County, and the rural district was transferred to the new Central District.
