= Dafchah =

Village in Gilan province, Iran

Dafchah Persian: دافچاه
- Village
- Location within Iran
- Coordinates: 37°21′08″N 49°41′53″E
- Country: Iran
- Province: Gilan
- County: Khomam
- District: Central
- Rural District: Kateh Sar-e Khomam

Population (2016)
  - Total: 1,325
- Time zone: UTC+3:30 (IRST)

Dafchah (Persian: دافچاه) (Note: Also romanized as Dāfchāh; also known as Katekūl-e Dāfchāh) is a village in Kateh Sar-e Khomam Rural District of the Central District in Khomam County, Gilan province, Iran.

== Demographics ==
=== Population ===
At the time of the 2006 National Census, the village's population was 1,632 in 470 households, when it was in the former Khomam District of Rasht County. The following census in 2011 counted 1,383 people in 465 households. The 2016 census measured the population of the village as 1,325 people in 467 households.

In 2020, the district was separated from the county in the establishment of Khomam County, and the rural district was transferred to the new Central District.
