= Marz Dasht =

Village in Gilan province, Iran

Marz Dasht Persian: مرزدشت
- Village
- Location within Iran
- Coordinates: 37°23′20″N 49°41′24″E
- Country: Iran
- Province: Gilan
- County: Khomam
- District: Central
- Rural District: Kateh Sar-e Khomam

Population (2016)
  - Total: 1,049
- Time zone: UTC+3:30 (IRST)

Marz Dasht (Persian: مرزدشت) is a village in Kateh Sar-e Khomam Rural District of the Central District in Khomam County, Gilan province, Iran.

== Demographics ==
=== Population ===
At the time of the 2006 National Census, the village's population was 1,149 in 327 households, when it was in the former Khomam District of Rasht County. The following census in 2011 counted 1,149 people in 394 households. The 2016 census measured the population of the village as 1,049 people in 364 households.

In 2020, the district was separated from the county in the establishment of Khomam County, and the rural district was transferred to the new Central District.
