= Rasteh Kenar-e Sheyjan =

Village in Gilan province, Iran

Rasteh Kenar-e Sheyjan Persian: راسته‌كنار شیجان
- Village
- Location within Iran
- Coordinates: 37°23′37″N 49°38′27″E
- Country: Iran
- Province: Gilan
- County: Khomam
- District: Central
- Rural District: Chapar Khaneh

Population (2016)
  - Total: 607
- Time zone: UTC+3:30 (IRST)

Rasteh Kenar-e Sheyjan (Persian: راسته‌كنار شیجان) (Note: Also romanized as Rāsteh Kenār-e Sheyjān) is a village in Chapar Khaneh Rural District of the Central District in Khomam County, Gilan province, in Iran.

== Demographics ==
=== Population ===
At the time of the 2006 National Census, the village's population was 1,076 in 309 households, when it was in the former Khomam District of Rasht County. The following census in 2011 counted 542 people in 173 households. The 2016 census measured the population of the village as 607 people in 211 households.

In 2020, the district was separated from the county in the establishment of Khomam County, and the rural district was transferred to the new Central District.
