= Fashtakeh =

Village in Gilan province, Iran

Fashtakeh Persian: فشتکه
- Village
- Location within Iran
- Coordinates: 37°25′43″N 49°39′33″E
- Country: Iran
- Province: Gilan
- County: Khomam
- District: Central
- Rural District: Chapar Khaneh

Population (2016)
  - Total: 1,901
- Time zone: UTC+3:30 (IRST)

Fashtakeh (Persian: فشتكه) (Note: Also known as Fashtakeh-ye Avval) is a village in Chapar Khaneh Rural District of the Central District in Khomam County, Gilan province, in Iran.

== Demographics ==
=== Population ===
At the time of the 2006 National Census, the village's population was 1,824 in 550 households, when it was in the former Khomam District of Rasht County. The following census in 2011 counted 1,849 people in 588 households. The 2016 census measured the population of the village as 1,901 people in 673 households. It was the most populous village in its rural district.

In 2020, the district was separated from the county in the establishment of Khomam County, and the rural district was transferred to the new Central District.
