= Jirsar-e Baqer Khaleh =

Village in Gilan province, Iran

Jirsar-e Baqer Khaleh Persian: جيرسرباقرخاله
- Village
- Location within Iran
- Coordinates: 37°22′52″N 49°34′12″E
- Country: Iran
- Province: Gilan
- County: Khomam
- District: Chukam
- Rural District: Forshki

Population (2016)
  - Total: 893
- Time zone: UTC+3:30 (IRST)

Jirsar-e Baqer Khaleh (Persian: جيرسرباقرخاله) (Note: Also romanized as Jīrsar-e Bāqer Khāleh; also known as Jīrsar-e Bāqer) is a village in Forshki Rural District of Chukam District in Khomam County, Gilan province, Iran.

== Demographics ==
=== Population ===
At the time of the 2006 National Census, the village's population was 905 in 223 households, when it was in Chukam Rural District (Note: Renamed Eshkik Rural District) of the former Khomam District in Rasht County. The following census in 2011 counted 740 people in 245 households. The 2016 census measured the population of the village as 893 people in 304 households.

In 2020, the district was separated from the county in the establishment of Khomam County. Jirsar-e Baqer Khaleh was transferred to Forshki Rural District created in the new Chukam District.
