= Jir Bagh =

Jir Bagh جيرباغ
- Village
- Location within Iran
- Coordinates: 37°22′59″N 50°10′55″E
- Country: Iran
- Province: Gilan
- County: Lahijan
- Bakhsh: Rudboneh
- Rural District: Shirju Posht

Population (2016)
  - Total: 295
- Time zone: UTC+3:30 (IRST)

Jir Bagh (Persian: جيرباغ, also Romanized as Jīr Bāgh; also known as Jīreh Bāgh) is a village in Shirju Posht Rural District, Rudboneh District, Lahijan County, Gilan Province, Iran. At the 2016 census, its population was 295, in 103 families. Down from 363 people in 2006.
