= Jirsar =

Jirsar (Persian: جيرسر) may refer to:

- Jirsar-e Bahambar
- Jirsar-e Baqer Khaleh
- Jirsar-e Chukam
- Jirsar-e Efnak
- Jirsar-e Nowdeh
- Jirsar-e Vishka
