= Fashu Poshteh =

Fashu Poshteh فشوپشته
- Village
- Location within Iran
- Coordinates: 37°16′57″N 50°07′03″E
- Country: Iran
- Province: Gilan
- County: Lahijan
- Bakhsh: Rudboneh
- Rural District: Shirju Posht

Population (2006)
  - Total: 233
- Time zone: UTC+3:30 (IRST)
  - Summer (DST): UTC+4:30 (IRDT)

Fashu Poshteh (Persian: فشوپشته, also Romanized as Fashū Poshteh) is a village in Shirju Posht Rural District, Rudboneh District, Lahijan County, Gilan Province, Iran. At the 2006 census, its population was 233, in 75 families.
