= Arbu Kolayeh =

Arbu Kolayeh اربوكلايه
- Village
- Country: Iran
- Province: Gilan
- County: Lahijan
- Bakhsh: Rudboneh
- Rural District: Shirju Posht

Population (2006)
  - Total: 106
- Time zone: UTC+3:30 (IRST)
  - Summer (DST): UTC+4:30 (IRDT)

Arbu Kolayeh (Persian: اربوكلايه, also Romanized as Ārbū Kolāyeh) is a village in Shirju Posht Rural District, Rudboneh District, Lahijan County, Gilan Province, Iran. At the 2006 census, its population was 106, in 29 families.
