= Barmacheh-ye Bala Mahal =

Village in Gilan province, Iran

Barmacheh-ye Bala Mahal Persian: برمچه بالا محل
- Village
- Location within Iran
- Coordinates: 37°20′27″N 49°40′12″E
- Country: Iran
- Province: Gilan
- County: Khomam
- District: Central
- Rural District: Kateh Sar-e Khomam

Population (2016)
  - Total: 493
- Time zone: UTC+3:30 (IRST)

Barmacheh-ye Bala Mahal (Persian: برمچه بالا محل) (Note: Also romanized as Barmacheh-ye Bālā Maḩal; also known as Barmache, Barmacheh, and Barmacheh-ye Bālā Maḩalleh) is a village in Kateh Sar-e Khomam Rural District of the Central District in Khomam County, Gilan province, Iran.

== Demographics ==
=== Population ===
At the time of the 2006 National Census, the village's population was 383 in 113 households, when it was in the former Khomam District of Rasht County. The following census in 2011 counted 629 people in 205 households. The 2016 census measured the population of the village as 493 people in 155 households.

In 2020, the district was separated from the county in the establishment of Khomam County, and the rural district was transferred to the new Central District.
