= Eyvan Estakhr =

Eyvan Estakhr ایوان استخر
- Village
- Location within Iran
- Coordinates: 37°19′34″N 50°08′32″E
- Country: Iran
- Province: Gilan
- County: Lahijan
- Bakhsh: Rudboneh
- Rural District: Shirju Posht

Population (2006)
  - Total: 441
- Time zone: UTC+3:30 (IRST)
  - Summer (DST): UTC+4:30 (IRDT)

Eyvan Estakhr (Persian: ایوان استخر, also Romanized as Eyvān Estakhr) is a village in Shirju Posht Rural District, Rudboneh District, Lahijan County, Gilan Province, Iran. According to the 2006 census, its population was 441, in 130 families.
