= Mian Mahalleh-ye Sheyjan =

Village in Gilan province, Iran

Mian Mahalleh-ye Sheyjan Persian: ميان‌محله شیجان
- Village
- Location within Iran
- Coordinates: 37°24′20″N 49°37′29″E
- Country: Iran
- Province: Gilan
- County: Khomam
- District: Central
- Rural District: Chapar Khaneh

Population (2016)
  - Total: 625
- Time zone: UTC+3:30 (IRST)

Mian Mahalleh-ye Sheyjan (Persian: ميان‌محله شیجان) (Note: Also romanized as Mīān Maḩalleh-ye Sheyjān) is a village in Chapar Khaneh Rural District of the Central District in Khomam County, Gilan province, in Iran.

== Demographics ==
=== Population ===
At the time of the 2006 National Census, the village's population was 678 in 208 households, when it was in the former Khomam District of Rasht County. The following census in 2011 counted 705 people in 246 households. The 2016 census measured the population of the village as 625 people in 224 households.

In 2020, the district was separated from the county in the establishment of Khomam County, and the rural district was transferred to the new Central District.
