= Saharkhiz Mahalleh =

Saharkhiz Mahalleh سحرخيزمحله
- Village
- Location within Iran
- Coordinates: 37°18′53″N 50°12′03″E
- Country: Iran
- Province: Gilan
- County: Lahijan
- Bakhsh: Rudboneh
- Rural District: Shirju Posht

Population (2016)
  - Total: 487
- Time zone: UTC+3:30 (IRST)

Saharkhiz Mahalleh (Persian: سحرخيزمحله, also Romanized as Saḩarkhīz Maḩalleh; also known as Saḩarkhīz) is a village in Shirju Posht Rural District, Rudboneh District, Lahijan County, Gilan Province, Iran. At the 2016 census, its population was 487, in 169 families. Up from 474 in 2006.
