= Arbastan =

Arbastan ارباستان
- Village
- Location within Iran
- Coordinates: 37°14′16″N 50°06′04″E
- Country: Iran
- Province: Gilan
- County: Lahijan
- Bakhsh: Rudboneh
- Rural District: Shirju Posht

Population (2006)
  - Total: 778
- Time zone: UTC+3:30 (IRST)
  - Summer (DST): UTC+4:30 (IRDT)

Arbastan (Persian: ارباستان, also Romanized as Arbāstān) is a village in Shirju Posht Rural District, Rudboneh District, Lahijan County, Gilan Province, Iran. At the 2006 census, its population was 778, in 211 families.

Arbastan has good people. The people of Arbastan are mostly farmers.
