= Titi Parizad =

Titi Parizad تي تي پريزاد
- Village
- Location within Iran
- Coordinates: 37°20′25″N 50°09′15″E
- Country: Iran
- Province: Gilan
- County: Lahijan
- Bakhsh: Rudboneh
- Rural District: Shirju Posht

Population (2006)
  - Total: 78
- Time zone: UTC+3:30 (IRST)
  - Summer (DST): UTC+4:30 (IRDT)

Titi Parizad (Persian: تي تي پريزاد, also Romanized as Tītī Parīzād; also known as Tītī Parīzādeh) is a village in Shirju Posht Rural District, Rudboneh District, Lahijan County, Gilan Province, Iran. At the 2006 census, its population was 78, in 25 families.
