= Mir Daryasar =

Mir Daryasar ميردرياسر
- Village
- Location within Iran
- Coordinates: 37°16′07″N 50°10′47″E
- Country: Iran
- Province: Gilan
- County: Lahijan
- Bakhsh: Rudboneh
- Rural District: Shirju Posht

Population (2006)
  - Total: 221
- Time zone: UTC+3:30 (IRST)
  - Summer (DST): UTC+4:30 (IRDT)

Mir Daryasar (Persian: ميردرياسر, also Romanized as Mīr Daryāsar) is a village in Shirju Posht Rural District, Rudboneh District, Lahijan County, Gilan Province, Iran. At the 2006 census, its population was 221, in 71 families.
