= Barmacheh-ye Pain Mahal =

Village in Gilan province, Iran

Barmacheh-ye Pain Mahal Persian: برمچه پائين محل
- Village
- Location within Iran
- Coordinates: 37°21′23″N 49°40′12″E
- Country: Iran
- Province: Gilan
- County: Khomam
- District: Central
- Rural District: Kateh Sar-e Khomam

Population (2016)
  - Total: 425
- Time zone: UTC+3:30 (IRST)

Barmacheh-ye Pain Mahalleh (Persian: برمچه پائين محل) (Note: Also romanized as Barmacheh-ye Pā’īn Maḩal; also known as Barmacheh) is a village in Kateh Sar-e Khomam Rural District of the Central District in Khomam County, Gilan province, Iran.

== Demographics ==
=== Population ===
At the time of the 2006 National Census, the village's population was 538 in 143 households, when it was in the former Khomam District of Rasht County. The following census in 2011 counted 316 people in 93 households. The 2016 census measured the population of the village as 425 people in 161 households.

In 2020, the district was separated from the county in the establishment of Khomam County, and the rural district was transferred to the new Central District.
