= Seyqal Boneh =

Seyqal Boneh صيقل بنه
- Village
- Location within Iran
- Coordinates: 37°14′45″N 50°08′24″E
- Country: Iran
- Province: Gilan
- County: Lahijan
- Bakhsh: Rudboneh
- Rural District: Shirju Posht

Population (2006)
  - Total: 201
- Time zone: UTC+3:30 (IRST)
  - Summer (DST): UTC+4:30 (IRDT)

Seyqal Boneh (Persian: صيقل بنه, also Romanized as Şeyqal Boneh; also known as Eslām Deh and Sakhl-e Baneh Bārgū Sarā) is a village in Shirju Posht Rural District, Rudboneh District, Lahijan County, Gilan Province, Iran. At the 2006 census, its population was 201, in 57 families.
