= Barmacheh =

Barmacheh (Persian: برمچه) may refer to:

- Barmacheh-ye Bala Mahal
- Barmacheh-ye Pain Mahal
