= Dahaneh Sar-e Sheyjan =

Village in Gilan province, Iran

Dahaneh Sar-e Sheyjan Persian: دهنه سرشيجان
- Village
- Location within Iran
- Coordinates: 37°25′39″N 49°34′32″E
- Country: Iran
- Province: Gilan
- County: Khomam
- District: Central
- Rural District: Chapar Khaneh

Population (2016)
  - Total: 1,004
- Time zone: UTC+3:30 (IRST)

Dahaneh Sar-e Sheyjan (Persian: دهنه‌سرِ شِيجان) is a village in Chapar Khaneh Rural District of the Central District in Khomam County, Gilan province, in Iran.

== Demographics ==
=== Population ===
At the time of the 2006 National Census, the village's population was 1,085 in 313 households, when it was in the former Khomam District of Rasht County. The following census in 2011 counted 1,128 people in 361 households. The 2016 census measured the population of the village as 1,004 people in 329 households.

In 2020, the district was separated from the county in the establishment of Khomam County, and the rural district was transferred to the new Central District.
