= Chapar Khaneh, Iran =

Chapar Khaneh (Persian: چاپارخانه) may refer to:

- Chapar Khaneh, postal service used in the Achaemenid Persian Empire
- Chapar Khaneh, Gilan
- Chapar Khaneh Rural District, in Gilan province
