= Chapar Khaneh, Gilan =

Village in Gilan province, Iran

Chapar Khaneh Persian: چاپارخانه
- Village
- Location within Iran
- Coordinates: 37°25′31″N 49°38′44″E
- Country: Iran
- Province: Gilan
- County: Khomam
- District: Central
- Rural District: Chapar Khaneh

Population (2016)
  - Total: 972
- Time zone: UTC+3:30 (IRST)

Chapar Khaneh (Persian: چاپارخانه) (Note: Also romanized as Chāpār Khāneh) is a village in, and the capital of, Chapar Khaneh Rural District in the Central District of Khomam County, Gilan province, Iran.

== Demographics ==
=== Population ===
At the time of the 2006 National Census, the village's population was 1,112 in 301 households, when it was in the former Khomam District of Rasht County. The following census in 2011 counted 1,148 people in 363 households. The 2016 census measured the population of the village as 972 people in 316 households.

In 2020, the district was separated from the county in the establishment of Khomam County, and the rural district was transferred to the new Central District.
