= Pain Mahalleh-ye Naser Kiadeh =

Pain Mahalleh-ye Naser Kiadeh پائين محله ناصركياده
- Village
- Location within Iran
- Coordinates: 37°19′44″N 50°09′30″E
- Country: Iran
- Province: Gilan
- County: Lahijan
- Bakhsh: Rudboneh
- Rural District: Shirju Posht

Population (2006)
  - Total: 511
- Time zone: UTC+3:30 (IRST)
  - Summer (DST): UTC+4:30 (IRDT)

Pain Mahalleh-ye Naser Kiadeh (Persian: پائين محله ناصركياده, also Romanized as Pā’īn Maḩalleh-ye Nāşer Kīādeh) is a village in Shirju Posht Rural District, Rudboneh District, Lahijan County, Gilan Province, Iran. At the 2006 census, its population was 511, in 153 families.
