= Yusef Deh =

Village in Gilan province, Iran

Yusef Deh Persian: يوسف ده
- Village
- Location within Iran
- Coordinates: 37°14′52″N 50°04′25″E
- Country: Iran
- Province: Gilan
- County: Lahijan
- District: Rudboneh
- Rural District: Rudboneh

Population (2016)
  - Total: 192
- Time zone: UTC+3:30 (IRST)

Yusef Deh (Persian: يوسف ده) (Note: Also romanized as Yūsef Deh) is a village in Rudboneh Rural District of Rudboneh District in Lahijan County, Gilan province, Iran.

== Demographics ==
=== Population ===
At the time of the 2006 National Census, the village's population was 263 in 81 households. The following census in 2011 counted 201 people in 70 households. The 2016 census measured the population of the village as 192 people in 80 households.
