= Pahmadan =

Village in Gilan province, Iran

Pahmadan Persian: پهمدان
- Village
- Location within Iran
- Coordinates: 37°16′38″N 50°03′01″E
- Country: Iran
- Province: Gilan
- County: Lahijan
- District: Rudboneh
- Rural District: Rudboneh

Population (2016)
  - Total: 1,682
- Time zone: UTC+3:30 (IRST)

Pahmadan (Persian: پهمدان) (Note: Also romanized as Pahmadān; also known as Mīān Maḩalleh-ye Pahmadān) is a village in Rudboneh Rural District of Rudboneh District in Lahijan County, Gilan province, Iran.

== Demographics ==
=== Population ===
At the time of the 2006 National Census, the village's population was 1,745 in 474 households. The following census in 2011 counted 1,688 people in 526 households. The 2016 census measured the population of the village as 1,682 people in 613 households. It was the most populous village in its rural district.
