= Beyn Kalayeh =

Village in Gilan province, Iran

Beyn Kalayeh Persian: بين كلايه
- Village
- Location within Iran
- Coordinates: 37°17′10″N 50°05′37″E
- Country: Iran
- Province: Gilan
- County: Lahijan
- District: Rudboneh
- Rural District: Shirju Posht

Population (2016)
  - Total: 643
- Time zone: UTC+3:30 (IRST)

Beyn Kalayeh (Persian: بين كلايه) (Note: Also romanized as Beyn Kalāyeh, Bin Kalayeh, and Bīn Kelāyeh) is a village in Shirju Posht Rural District of Rudboneh District in Lahijan County, Gilan province, Iran.

== Demographics ==
=== Population ===
At the time of the 2006 National Census, the village's population was 883 in 259 households. The following census in 2011 counted 808 people in 259 households. The 2016 census measured the population of the village as 643 people in 246 households.
