= Hasan Bekandeh =

Village in Gilan province, Iran

Hasan Bekandeh Persian: حسن بكنده
- Village
- Location within Iran
- Coordinates: 37°20′58″N 50°12′00″E
- Country: Iran
- Province: Gilan
- County: Lahijan
- District: Rudboneh
- Rural District: Shirju Posht

Population (2016)
  - Total: 626
- Time zone: UTC+3:30 (IRST)

Hasan Bekandeh (Persian: حسن بكنده) (Note: Also romanized as Ḩasan Bekandeh) is a village in Shirju Posht Rural District of Rudboneh District in Lahijan County, Gilan province, Iran.

== Demographics ==
=== Population ===
At the time of the 2006 National Census, the village's population was 639 in 183 households. The following census in 2011 counted 663 people in 202 households. The 2016 census measured the population of the village as 626 people in 209 households.
