= Mian Mahalleh-ye Chaf Gavieh =

Mian Mahalleh-ye Chaf Gavieh ميان محله چاف گاويه
- Village
- Country: Iran
- Province: Gilan
- County: Lahijan
- Bakhsh: Rudboneh
- Rural District: Shirju Posht

Population (2006)
  - Total: 127
- Time zone: UTC+3:30 (IRST)
  - Summer (DST): UTC+4:30 (IRDT)

Mian Mahalleh-ye Chaf Gavieh (Persian: ميان محله چاف گاويه, also Romanized as Mīān Maḩalleh-ye Chāf Gāvīeh) is a village in Shirju Posht Rural District, Rudboneh District, Lahijan County, Gilan Province, Iran. At the 2006 census, its population was 127, in 41 families.
