= Naser Kiadeh-ye Mian Mahalleh =

Naser Kiadeh-ye Mian Mahalleh ناصركياده ميان محله
- Village
- Location within Iran
- Coordinates: 37°18′42″N 50°10′04″E
- Country: Iran
- Province: Gilan
- County: Lahijan
- Bakhsh: Rudboneh
- Rural District: Shirju Posht

Population (2006)
  - Total: 226
- Time zone: UTC+3:30 (IRST)
  - Summer (DST): UTC+4:30 (IRDT)

Naser Kiadeh-ye Mian Mahalleh (Persian: ناصركياده ميان محله, also Romanized as Nāşer Kīādeh-ye Mīān Maḩalleh; also known as Mīān Maḩalleh-ye Nāşer Kīādeh) is a village in Shirju Posht Rural District, Rudboneh District, Lahijan County, Gilan Province, Iran. At the 2006 census, its population was 226, in 68 families.
