= Forshki Rural District =

Rural district in Gilan province, Iran

Forshki Rural District Persian: دهستان فرشکی
- Rural District
- Location within Iran
- Coordinates: 37°23′N 49°35′E
- Country: Iran
- Province: Gilan
- County: Khomam
- District: Chukam
- Established: 2020
- Capital: Forshki-ye Chukam
- Time zone: UTC+3:30 (IRST)

Forshki Rural District (Persian: دهستان فرشکی) is in Chukam District of Khomam County, Gilan province, Iran. Its capital is the village of Forshki-ye Chukam, whose population at the time of the 2016 National Census was 1,000 in 330 households.

== History ==
In 2020, Khomam District was separated from Rasht County in the establishment of Khomam County, and Forshki Rural District was created in the new Chukam District.

== Other villages in the rural district ==
- Bij
- Bijirud Kol
- Jirsar-e Baqer Khaleh
- Jirsar-e Chukam
- Lalehka
- Mian Kol
