= Mehdiabad, Gilan =

Village in Gilan province, Iran

Mehdiabad Persian: مهدي اباد
- Village
- Location within Iran
- Coordinates: 37°18′09″N 50°05′09″E
- Country: Iran
- Province: Gilan
- County: Lahijan
- District: Rudboneh
- Rural District: Rudboneh

Population (2016)
  - Total: 452
- Time zone: UTC+3:30 (IRST)

Mehdiabad (Persian: مهدي اباد) (Note: Also romanized as Mehdīābād; also known as Mehdīābād-e Sheykh ‘Alī Kelāyeh) is a village in Rudboneh Rural District of Rudboneh District in Lahijan County, Gilan province, Iran.

== Demographics ==
=== Population ===
At the time of the 2006 National Census, the village's population was 662 in 186 households. The following census in 2011 counted 517 people in 170 households. The 2016 census measured the population of the village as 452 people in 161 households.
