= Charuq Duz Mahalleh =

Village in Gilan province, Iran

Charuq Duz Mahalleh Persian: چاروق دوزمحله
- Village
- Location within Iran
- Coordinates: 37°16′33″N 50°00′43″E
- Country: Iran
- Province: Gilan
- County: Lahijan
- District: Rudboneh
- Rural District: Rudboneh

Population (2016)
  - Total: 127
- Time zone: UTC+3:30 (IRST)

Charuq Duz Mahalleh (Persian: چاروق دوزمحله) (Note: Also Romanized as Chārūq Dūz Maḩalleh) is a village in Rudboneh Rural District of Rudboneh District in Lahijan County, Gilan province, Iran.

== Demographics ==
=== Population ===
At the time of the 2006 National Census, the village's population was 166 in 57 households. The following census in 2011 counted 123 people in 41 households. The 2016 census measured the population of the village as 127 people in 47 households.
