= Akbarabad, Lahijan =

Village in Gilan province, Iran

Akbarabad Persian: اكبراباد
- Village
- Location within Iran
- Coordinates: 37°17′40″N 50°04′22″E
- Country: Iran
- Province: Gilan
- County: Lahijan
- District: Rudboneh
- Rural District: Rudboneh

Population (2016)
  - Total: 586
- Time zone: UTC+3:30 (IRST)

Akbarabad (Persian: اكبراباد) (Note: Also romanized as Akbarābād) is a village in Rudboneh Rural District of Rudboneh District in Lahijan County, Gilan province, Iran.

== Demographics ==
=== Population ===
At the time of the 2006 National Census, the village's population was 691 in 225 households. The following census in 2011 counted 586 people in 206 households. The 2016 census measured the population of the village as 586 people in 214 households.
