= Hasan Ali Deh =

Village in Gilan province, Iran

Hasan Ali Deh Persian: حسنعلي ده
- Village
- Location within Iran
- Coordinates: 37°21′34″N 50°09′41″E
- Country: Iran
- Province: Gilan
- County: Lahijan
- District: Rudboneh
- Rural District: Shirju Posht

Population (2016)
  - Total: 575
- Time zone: UTC+3:30 (IRST)

Hasan Ali Deh (Persian: حسنعلي ده) (Note: Also romanized as Ḩasan ‘Alī Deh; also known as Ḩasan ‘Alī Deh-e Bālā and Ḩasan ‘Alī Deh-e Bālā Maḩalleh) is a village in Shirju Posht Rural District of Rudboneh District in Lahijan County, Gilan province, Iran.

== Demographics ==
=== Population ===
At the time of the 2006 National Census, the village's population was 750 in 248 households. The following census in 2011 counted 547 people in 197 households. The 2016 census measured the population of the village as 575 people in 239 households.
