= Imamdeh =

Village in Gilan province, Iran

Imamdeh Persian: امامده
- Village
- Location within Iran
- Coordinates: 37°15′43″N 50°04′42″E
- Country: Iran
- Province: Gilan
- County: Lahijan
- District: Rudboneh
- Rural District: Rudboneh

Population (2016)
  - Total: 602
- Time zone: UTC+3:30 (IRST)

Imamdeh (Persian: امامده) (Note: Also romanized as Imamdeh) is a village in of Rudboneh District in Lahijan County, Gilan province, Iran.

== Demographics ==
=== Population ===
At the time of the 2006 National Census, the village's population was 775 in 275 households. The following census in 2011 counted 720 people in 243 households. The 2016 census measured the population of the village as 602 people in 235 households.
