= Sarajar =

Village in Gilan province, Iran

Sarajar Persian: سراجار
- Village
- Location within Iran
- Coordinates: 37°16′33″N 50°09′49″E
- Country: Iran
- Province: Gilan
- County: Lahijan
- District: Rudboneh
- Rural District: Shirju Posht

Population (2016)
  - Total: 765
- Time zone: UTC+3:30 (IRST)

Sarajar (Persian: سراجار) (Note: Also romanized as Sarājār; also known as Sarachar and Sarājār-e Pā’īn Maḩalleh) is a village in Shirju Posht Rural District of Rudboneh District in Lahijan County, Gilan province, Iran.

== Demographics ==
=== Population ===
At the time of the 2006 National Census, the village's population was 852 in 258 households. The following census in 2011 counted 812 people in 286 households. The 2016 census measured the population of the village as 765 people in 293 households.
