= Ishgah, Rudboneh =

Village in Gilan province, Iran

Ishgah Persian: ايشگاه
- Village
- Location within Iran
- Coordinates: 37°17′44″N 50°03′29″E
- Country: Iran
- Province: Gilan
- County: Lahijan
- District: Rudboneh
- Rural District: Rudboneh

Population (2016)
  - Total: 445
- Time zone: UTC+3:30 (IRST)

Ishgah (Persian: ايشگاه) (Note: Also romanized as Īshgāh) is a village in Rudboneh Rural District of Rudboneh District in Lahijan County, Gilan province, Iran.

== Demographics ==
=== Population ===
At the time of the 2006 National Census, the village's population was 535 in 165 households. The following census in 2011 counted 459 people in 159 households. The 2016 census measured the population of the village as 445 people in 163 households.
