= Shirju Posht-e Bala =

Shirju Posht-e Bala شيرجوپشت بالا
- Village
- Location within Iran
- Coordinates: 37°15′45″N 50°05′59″E
- Country: Iran
- Province: Gilan
- County: Lahijan
- Bakhsh: Rudboneh
- Rural District: Shirju Posht

Population (2006)
  - Total: 594
- Time zone: UTC+3:30 (IRST)
  - Summer (DST): UTC+4:30 (IRDT)

Shirju Posht-e Bala (Persian: شيرجوپشت بالا, also Romanized as Shīrjū Posht-e Bālā; also known as Shīrjū Posht and Shīrjū Posht-e Bālā Maḩalleh) is a village in Shirju Posht Rural District, Rudboneh District, Lahijan County, Gilan Province, Iran. At the 2006 census, its population was 594, in 164 families.
