= Hajj Salim Mahalleh =

Village in Gilan province, Iran

Hajj Salim Mahalleh Persian: حاج سليم محله
- Village
- Location within Iran
- Coordinates: 37°14′27″N 50°01′11″E
- Country: Iran
- Province: Gilan
- County: Lahijan
- District: Rudboneh
- Rural District: Rudboneh

Population (2016)
  - Total: 390
- Time zone: UTC+3:30 (IRST)

Hajj Salim Mahalleh (Persian: حاج سليم محله) (Note: Also romanized as Ḩājj Salīm Maḩalleh; also known as Ḩājjī Salīm Maḩalleh) is a village in Rudboneh Rural District of Rudboneh District in Lahijan County, Gilan province, Iran.

== Demographics ==
=== Population ===
At the time of the 2006 National Census, the village's population was 918 in 281 households. The following census in 2011 counted 958 people in 308 households. The 2016 census measured the population of the village as 390 people in 149 households.
