= Raiyyat Mahalleh =

Village in Gilan province, Iran

Raiyyat Mahalleh Persian: رعيت محله
- Village
- Location within Iran
- Country: Iran
- Province: Gilan
- County: Lahijan
- District: Rudboneh
- Rural District: Rudboneh

Population (2016)
  - Total: 285
- Time zone: UTC+3:30 (IRST)

Raiyyat Mahalleh (Persian: رعيت محله) (Note: Also romanized as Ra‘īyyat Maḩalleh) is a village in Rudboneh Rural District of Rudboneh District in Lahijan County, Gilan province, Iran.

== Demographics ==
=== Population ===
At the time of the 2006 National Census, the village's population was 321 in 87 households. The following census in 2011 counted 304 people in 95 households. The 2016 census measured the population of the village as 285 people in 99 households.
