= Bala Rudposht =

Village in Gilan province, Iran

Bala Rudposht Persian: بالارودپشت
- Village
- Location within Iran
- Coordinates: 37°16′39″N 50°06′08″E
- Country: Iran
- Province: Gilan
- County: Lahijan
- District: Rudboneh
- Rural District: Shirju Posht

Population (2016)
  - Total: 824
- Time zone: UTC+3:30 (IRST)

Bala Rudposht (Persian: بالارودپشت) (Note: Also romanized as Bālā Rūdposht) is a village in Shirju Posht Rural District of Rudboneh District in Lahijan County, Gilan province, Iran.

== Demographics ==
=== Population ===
At the time of the 2006 National Census, the village's population was 1,214 in 363 households. The following census in 2011 counted 1,110 people in 370 households. The 2016 census measured the population of the village as 824 people in 304 households.
