= Kohneh Rudposht =

Village in Gilan province, Iran

Kohneh Rudposht Persian: كهنه رودپشت
- Village
- Location within Iran
- Coordinates: 37°18′54″N 50°06′17″E
- Country: Iran
- Province: Gilan
- County: Lahijan
- District: Rudboneh
- Rural District: Rudboneh

Population (2016)
  - Total: 375
- Time zone: UTC+3:30 (IRST)

Kohneh Rudposht (Persian: كهنه رودپشت) (Note: Also romanized as Kohneh Rūdposht) is a village in Rudboneh Rural District of Rudboneh District in Lahijan County, Gilan province, Iran.

== Demographics ==
=== Population ===
At the time of the 2006 National Census, the village's population was 381 in 131 households. The following census in 2011 counted 373 people in 134 households. The 2016 census measured the population of the village as 375 people in 141 households.
