= Lakmeh Sar =

Village in Gilan province, Iran

Lakmeh Sar Persian: لاکمه‌سر
- Village
- Location within Iran
- Coordinates: 37°15′25″N 49°59′50″E
- Country: Iran
- Province: Gilan
- County: Lahijan
- District: Rudboneh
- Rural District: Rudboneh

Population (2016)
  - Total: 375
- Time zone: UTC+3:30 (IRST)

Lakmeh Sar (Persian: لاکمه‌سر) (Note: Also romanized as Lākmeh Sar) is a village in Rudboneh Rural District of Rudboneh District in Lahijan County, Gilan province, Iran.

== Demographics ==
=== Population ===
At the time of the 2006 National Census, the village's population was 564 in 172 households. The following census in 2011 counted 387 people in 129 households. The 2016 census measured the population of the village as 375 people in 142 households.
