= Golchal, Lahijan =

Village in Gilan province, Iran

Golchal Persian: گلچال
- Village
- Location within Iran
- Coordinates: 37°14′53″N 50°00′34″E
- Country: Iran
- Province: Gilan
- County: Lahijan
- District: Rudboneh
- Rural District: Rudboneh

Population (2016)
  - Total: 276
- Time zone: UTC+3:30 (IRST)

Golchal (Persian: گلچال) (Note: Also romanized as Golchāl; formerly known as Damuchal (دموچال), also romanized as Dāmūchāl; also known as Damchāl) is a village in Rudboneh Rural District of Rudboneh District in Lahijan County, Gilan province, Iran.

== Demographics ==
=== Language ===
It is an ancestrally Gilaki speaking village with a small minority of Azeri Turkic speakers.

=== Population ===
At the time of the 2006 National Census, the village's population, as Damuchal, was 261 in 82 households. The following census in 2011 counted 266 people in 87 households, by which time the village was listed as Golchal. The 2016 census measured the population of the village as 276 people in 106 households.

== Notable people ==
Mohammad Ali Faiz Lahijani Gilani, Shia cleric
