= Barku Sara =

Village in Gilan province, Iran

Barku Sara Persian: باركوسرا
- Village
- Location within Iran
- Coordinates: 37°15′47″N 50°07′21″E
- Country: Iran
- Province: Gilan
- County: Lahijan
- District: Rudboneh
- Rural District: Shirju Posht

Population (2016)
  - Total: 1,368
- Time zone: UTC+3:30 (IRST)

Barku Sara (Persian: باركوسرا) (Note: Also romanized as Bārkū Sarā; also known as Bargū Sarā and Bārgū Sarā) is a village in Shirju Posht Rural District of Rudboneh District in Lahijan County, Gilan province, Iran.

== Demographics ==
=== Population ===
At the time of the 2006 National Census, the village's population was 1,645 in 478 households. The following census in 2011 counted 1,451 people in 493 households. The 2016 census measured the population of the village as 1,368 people in 520 households. It was the most populous village in its rural district.
