= Chukam =

City in Gilan province, Iran

Chukam Persian: چوكام
- City
- Location within Iran
- Coordinates: 37°22′56″N 49°37′14″E
- Country: Iran
- Province: Gilan
- County: Khomam
- District: Chukam
- Established as a city: 2023

Population (2016)
  - Total: 3,096
- Time zone: UTC+3:30 (IRST)

Chukam (Persian: چوكام) (Note: Also romanized as Chowkām and Chūkām; formerly Bala Mahalleh-ye Chukam (بالامحله چوكام), also romanized as Bālā Maḩalleh-ye Chūkām; also known as Bāzār Chowgām, Bāzār Chowkām, Bāzār Chūkām, Chokam, and Chyukam) is a city in, and the capital of, Chukam District in Khomam County, Gilan province, Iran. As the village of Bala Mahalleh-ye Chukam, it was the capital of Chukam Rural District (Note: Renamed Eshkik Rural District) until its capital was transferred to the village of Eshkik.

== Demographics ==
=== Population ===
At the time of the 2006 National Census, Chukam's population was 2,869 in 793 households, when it was a village in Chukam Rural District of the former Khomam District in Rasht County. The following census in 2011 counted 3,222 people in 994 households. The 2016 census measured the population of the village as 3,096 people in 1,019 households.

In 2020, the district was separated from the county in the establishment of Khomam County and the rural district was transferred to the new Chukam District. Bala Mahalleh-ye Chukam was converted to a city as Chukam.
