= Kurandeh =

Village in Gilan province, Iran

Kurandeh Persian: كورنده
- Village
- Location within Iran
- Coordinates: 37°17′16″N 50°09′40″E
- Country: Iran
- Province: Gilan
- County: Lahijan
- District: Rudboneh
- Rural District: Shirju Posht

Population (2016)
  - Total: 1,145
- Time zone: UTC+3:30 (IRST)

Kurandeh (Persian: كورنده) (Note: Also romanized as Kūrandeh) is a village in Shirju Posht Rural District of Rudboneh District in Lahijan County, Gilan province, Iran.

== Demographics ==
=== Population ===
At the time of the 2006 National Census, the village's population was 1,009 in 313 households. The following census in 2011 counted 1,134 people in 390 households. The 2016 census measured the population of the village as 1,145 people in 447 households.
