= Pain Mahalleh-ye Rudboneh =

Village in Gilan province, Iran

Pain Mahalleh-ye Rudboneh Persian: پايين محله رودبنه
- Village
- Location within Iran
- Coordinates: 37°15′52″N 50°02′43″E
- Country: Iran
- Province: Gilan
- County: Lahijan
- District: Rudboneh
- Rural District: Rudboneh

Population (2016)
  - Total: 403
- Time zone: UTC+3:30 (IRST)

Pain Mahalleh-ye Rudboneh (Persian: پايين محله رودبنه) (Note: Also romanized as Pā’īn Maḩalleh-ye Rūdbaneh and Pā’īn Maḩalleh-ye Rūdboneh; also known as Pā’īn Rūd Beneh) is a village in Rudboneh Rural District of Rudboneh District in Lahijan County, Gilan province, Iran.

== Demographics ==
=== Population ===
At the time of the 2006 National Census, the village's population was 415 in 120 households. The following census in 2011 counted 424 people in 133 households. The 2016 census measured the population of the village as 403 people in 145 households.
