= Khomam =

City in Gilan province, Iran

Khomam Persian: خمام
- City
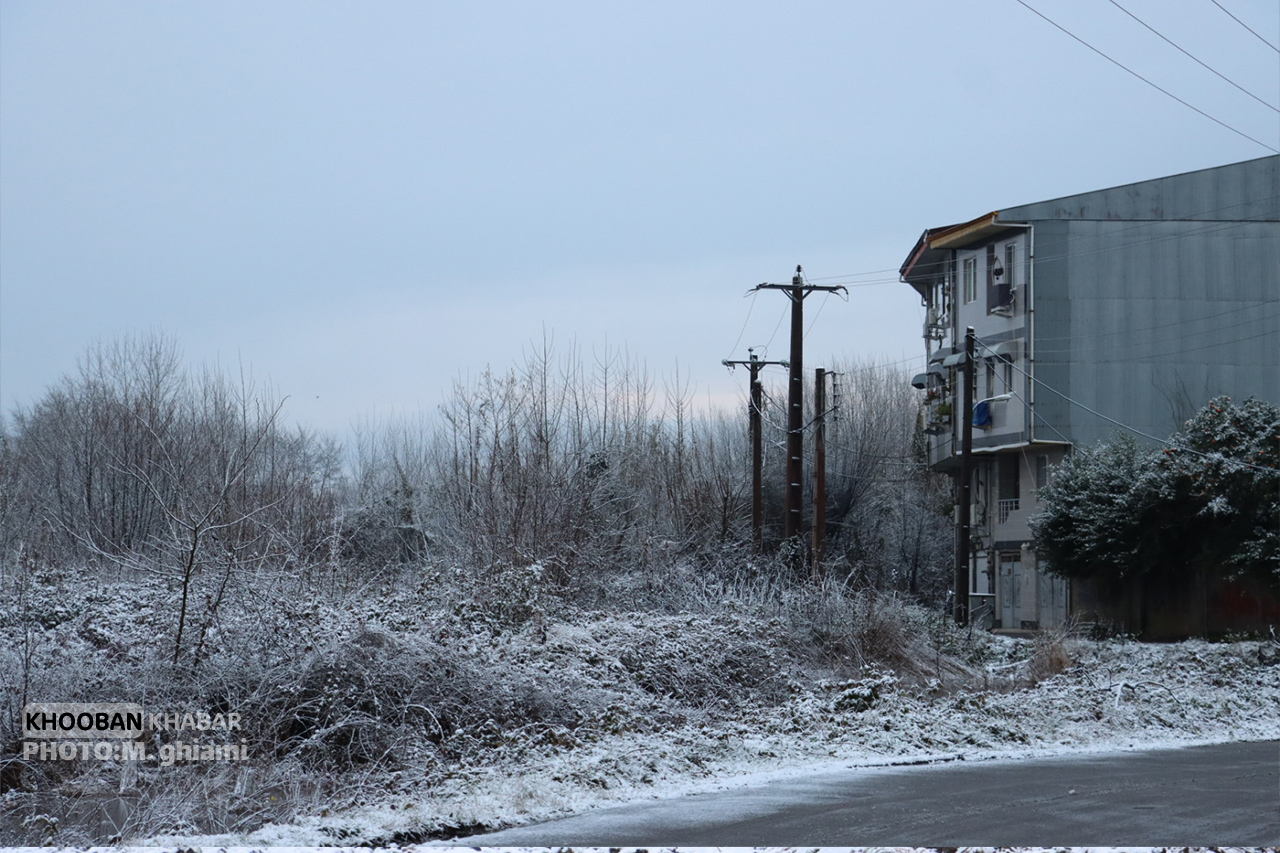
- Khomam after snwofall, 2025

- Location within Iran
- Coordinates: 37°23′28″N 49°39′35″E
- Country: Iran
- Province: Gilan
- County: Khomam
- District: Central

Population (2016)
  - Total: 20,897
- Time zone: UTC+3:30 (IRST)

Khomam (Persian: خمام) (Note: Also romanized as Khemam and Khomām; also known as Bāzār Khomām, Bāzār-i-Khuman, and Khumam (Gilaki: خۊمام)) is a city in the Central District of Khomam County, Gilan province, Iran, serving as the capital of both the county and the district.

The city of Khomam is on the road connecting the two major and tourist cities of Gilan province, Rasht and Anzali. According to the police, Rasht to Khomam was the second-busiest road in the province in 2015.

Khomam is the nearest city to the center of Gilan province, Rasht, about 7 km, and to Bandar-e Anzali it is 15 km. Khomam is connected to the Caspian Sea in the north through the coast of Jafrud Bala (1.5 km long) and is considered a border town. In the west it is connected to the east coast of Anzali Lagoon through Dahaneh Sar-e Sheyjan village and Jirsar-e Baqer Khaleh village. 7 villages in the suburbs of Khomam are part of the Anzali Free Zone.

== Demographics ==
=== Population ===
At the time of the 2006 National Census, the city's population was 12,901 in 3,816 households, when it was capital of the former Khomam District in Rasht County. The following census in 2011 counted 17,106 people in 5,605 households. The 2016 census measured the population of the city as 20,897 people in 7,143 households.

In 2020, the district was separated from the county in the establishment of Khomam County, and Khomam was transferred to the new Central District as the county's capital.
