= Sharafshadeh =

Village in Gilan province, Iran

Sharafshadeh Persian: شرفشاده
- Village
- Location within Iran
- Coordinates: 37°19′56″N 50°06′30″E
- Country: Iran
- Province: Gilan
- County: Lahijan
- District: Rudboneh
- Rural District: Rudboneh

Population (2016)
  - Total: 340
- Time zone: UTC+3:30 (IRST)

Sharafshadeh (Persian: شرفشاده) (Note: Also romanized as Sharaf Shādeh and Sharafshādeh) is a village in Rudboneh Rural District of Rudboneh District in Lahijan County, Gilan province, Iran.

== Demographics ==
=== Population ===
At the time of the 2006 National Census, the village's population was 419 in 150 households. The following census in 2011 counted 356 people in 141 households. The 2016 census measured the population of the village as 340 people in 135 households.
