= Seda Poshteh =

Village in Gilan province, Iran

Seda Poshteh Persian: صداپشته
- Village
- Location within Iran
- Coordinates: 37°16′18″N 50°01′44″E
- Country: Iran
- Province: Gilan
- County: Lahijan
- District: Rudboneh
- Rural District: Rudboneh

Population (2016)
  - Total: 336
- Time zone: UTC+3:30 (IRST)

Seda Poshteh (Persian: صداپشته) (Note: Also romanized as Şedā Poshteh) is a village in Rudboneh Rural District of Rudboneh District in Lahijan County, Gilan province, Iran.

== Demographics ==
=== Population ===
At the time of the 2006 National Census, the village's population was 447 in 151 households. The following census in 2011 counted 282 people in 99 households. The 2016 census measured the population of the village as 336 people in 124 households.
