= Kachelam =

Village in Gilan province, Iran

Kachelam Persian: كچلام
- Village
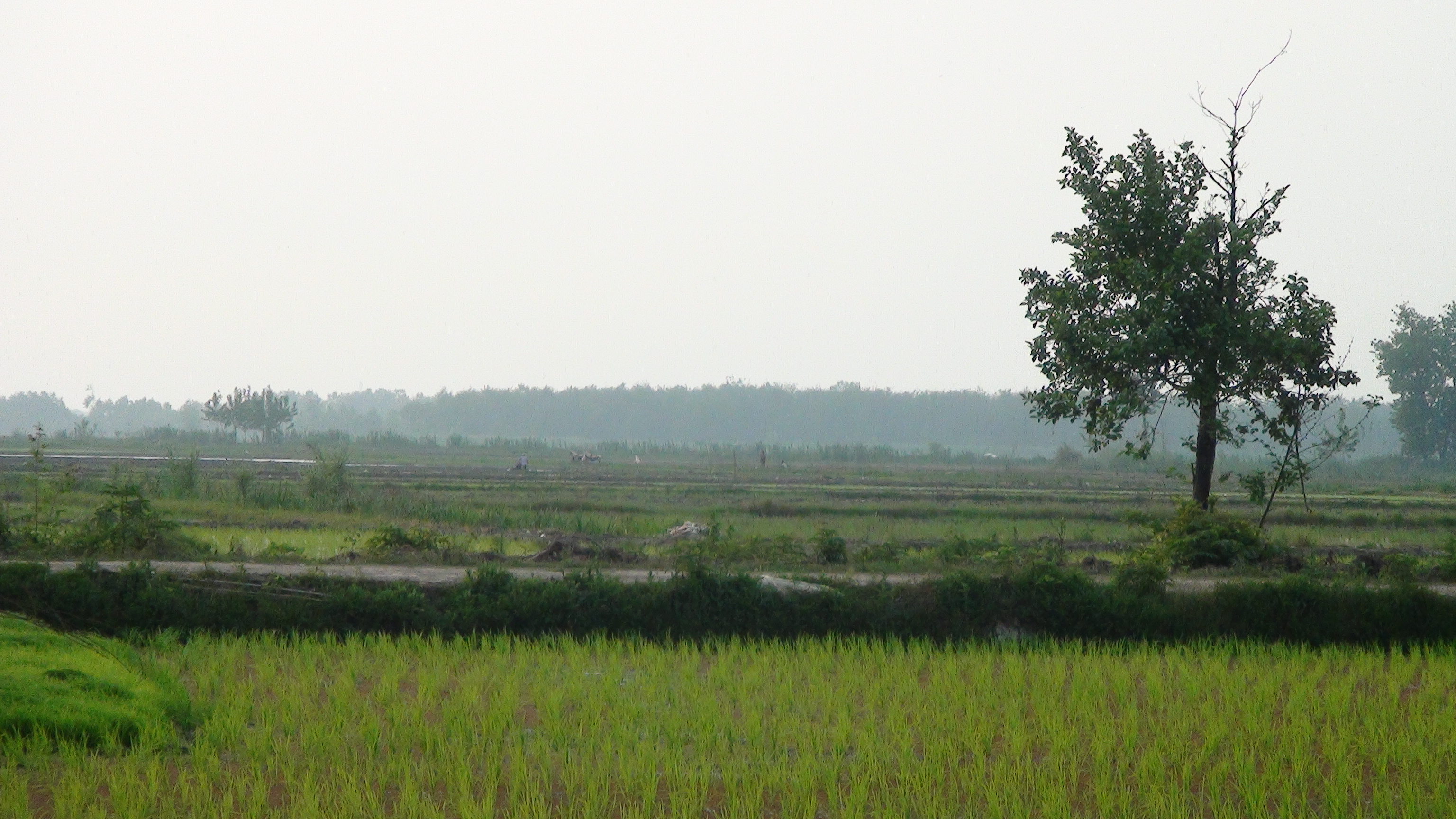
- Kachelam in Spring

- Location within Iran
- Coordinates: 37°18′23″N 50°07′44″E
- Country: Iran
- Province: Gilan
- County: Lahijan
- District: Rudboneh
- Rural District: Shirju Posht

Population (2016)
  - Total: 598
- Time zone: UTC+3:30 (IRST)

Kachlam (Persian: كچلام) (Note: Also romanized as Kachlām) is a village in Shirju Posht Rural District of Rudboneh District in Lahijan County, Gilan province, Iran.

== Demographics ==
=== Population ===
At the time of the 2006 National Census, the village's population was 693 in 227 households. The following census in 2011 counted 662 people in 237 households. The 2016 census measured the population of the village as 598 people in 234 households.
