= Sheykh Ali Kalayeh =

Village in Gilan province, Iran

Sheykh Ali Kalayeh Persian: شيخ علي كلايه
- Village
- Location within Iran
- Coordinates: 37°17′50″N 50°04′54″E
- Country: Iran
- Province: Gilan
- County: Lahijan
- District: Rudboneh
- Rural District: Rudboneh

Population (2016)
  - Total: 395
- Time zone: UTC+3:30 (IRST)

Sheykh Ali Kalayeh (Persian: شيخ علي كلايه) (Note: Also romanized as Sheykh ‘Alī Kalāyeh and Sheykh ‘Alī Kelāyeh) is a village in Rudboneh Rural District of Rudboneh District in Lahijan County, Gilan province, Iran.

== Demographics ==
=== Population ===
At the time of the 2006 National Census, the village's population was 410 in 125 households. The following census in 2011 counted 451 people in 150 households. The 2016 census measured the population of the village as 395 people in 143 households.
