= Kanaf Gurab =

Village in Gilan province, Iran

Kanaf Gurab Persian: كنف‌گوراب
- Village
- Location within Iran
- Coordinates: 37°15′16″N 49°59′27″E
- Country: Iran
- Province: Gilan
- County: Lahijan
- District: Rudboneh
- Rural District: Rudboneh

Population (2016)
  - Total: 138
- Time zone: UTC+3:30 (IRST)

Kanaf Gurab (Persian: كنف‌گوراب) (Note: Also romanized as Kanaf Goorab, Kanaf Gūrāb, and Kanefgurāb) is a village in Rudboneh Rural District of Rudboneh District in Lahijan County, Gilan province, Iran.

== Demographics ==
=== Population ===
At the time of the 2006 National Census, the village's population was 141 in 41 households. The following census in 2011 counted 149 people in 44 households. The 2016 census measured the population of the village as 138 people in 50 households.
