= Shirju Posht-e Pain =

Shirju Posht-e Pain شيرجوپشت پائين
- Village
- Location within Iran
- Coordinates: 37°15′44″N 50°06′37″E
- Country: Iran
- Province: Gilan
- County: Lahijan
- Bakhsh: Rudboneh
- Rural District: Shirju Posht

Population (2006)
  - Total: 343
- Time zone: UTC+3:30 (IRST)
  - Summer (DST): UTC+4:30 (IRDT)

Shirju Posht-e Pain (Persian: شيرجوپشت پائين, also Romanized as Shīrjū Posht-e Pā’īn; also known as Shīrjū Posht-e Pā’īn Maḩalleh) is a village in Shirju Posht Rural District, Rudboneh District, Lahijan County, Gilan Province, Iran. At the 2006 census, its population was 343, in 96 families.
