= Mian Mahalleh-ye Rudboneh =

Village in Gilan province, Iran

Mian Mahalleh-ye Rudboneh Persian: ميان محله رودبنه
- Village
- Location within Iran
- Coordinates: 37°15′47″N 50°01′45″E
- Country: Iran
- Province: Gilan
- County: Lahijan
- District: Rudboneh
- Rural District: Rudboneh

Population (2016)
  - Total: 61
- Time zone: UTC+3:30 (IRST)

Mian Mahalleh-ye Rudboneh (Persian: ميان محله رودبنه) (Note: Also romanized as Mīān Maḩalleh-ye Rūdbaneh and Mīān Maḩalleh-ye Rūdboneh) is a village in Rudboneh Rural District of Rudboneh District in Lahijan County, Gilan province, Iran.

== Demographics ==
=== Population ===
At the time of the 2006 National Census, the village's population was 105 in 28 households. The following census in 2011 counted 74 people in 22 households. The 2016 census measured the population of the village as 61 people in 21 households.
