= Kateh Sar-e Khomam Rural District =

Rural district in Gilan province, Iran

Kateh Sar-e Khomam Rural District Persian: دهستان كته‌سر خمام
- Rural District
- Location within Iran
- Coordinates: 37°22′N 49°42′E
- Country: Iran
- Province: Gilan
- County: Khomam
- District: Central
- Established: 1987
- Capital: Kateh Sar

Population (2016)
  - Total: 10,463
- Time zone: UTC+3:30 (IRST)

Kateh Sar-e Khomam Rural District (Persian: دهستان كته‌سر خمام) is in the Central District of Khomam County, Gilan province, in Iran. Its capital is the village of Kateh Sar.

== Demographics ==
=== Population ===
At the time of the 2006 National Census, the rural district's population (as a part of the former Khomam District in Rasht County) was 11,757 in 3,416 households. There were 11,406 inhabitants in 3,778 households at the following census of 2011. The 2016 census measured the population of the rural district as 10,463 in 3,687 households. The most populous of its 12 villages was Kalachah, with 1,926 people.

In 2020, the district was separated from the county in the establishment of Khomam County, and the rural district was transferred to the new Central District.

=== Other villages in the rural district ===
- Barmacheh-ye Bala Mahal
- Barmacheh-ye Pain Mahal
- Dafchah
- Eshmenan Talem
- Esmailabad
- Kevisha
- Lat
- Marz Dasht
- Meshka Posht
- Tisiyeh
