= Bala Mahalleh-ye Naser Kiadeh =

Village in Gilan province, Iran

Bala Mahalleh-ye Naser Kiadeh Persian: بالامحله ناصركياده
- Village
- Location within Iran
- Coordinates: 37°18′01″N 50°09′07″E
- Country: Iran
- Province: Gilan
- County: Lahijan
- District: Rudboneh
- Rural District: Shirju Posht

Population (2016)
  - Total: 829
- Time zone: UTC+3:30 (IRST)

Bala Mahalleh-ye Naser Kiadeh (Persian: بالامحله ناصركياده) (Note: Also romanized as Bālā Maḩalleh-ye Nāşer Kīādeh; also known as Nāşer Kīādeh) is a village in, and the capital of, Shirju Posht Rural District in Rudboneh District of Lahijan County in Iran's Gilan province.

== Demographics ==
=== Population ===
At the time of the 2006 National Census, the village's population was 1,019 in 314 households. The following census in 2011 counted 792 people in 265 households. The 2016 census measured the population of the village as 829 people in 298 households.
