= Rudboneh =

City in Gilan province, Iran

Rudboneh Persian: رودبنه
- City
- Location within Iran
- Coordinates: 37°15′23″N 50°00′25″E
- Country: Iran
- Province: Gilan
- County: Lahijan
- District: Rudboneh
- Established as a city: 2000

Population (2016)
  - Total: 3,441
- Time zone: UTC+3:30 (IRST)

Rudboneh (Persian: رودبنه) (Note: Also romanized as Rood Boneh, Rūd Boneh, Rūdbaneh, Rūdbeneh, and Rūdboneh; Gilaki: رۊدبنه) is a city in, and the capital of, Rudboneh District of Lahijan County, Gilan province, Iran. It also serves as the administrative center for Rudboneh Rural District. The village of Rudboneh was converted to a city in 2000.

== Demographics ==
=== Language ===
Linguistically the town is indigenous Gilaki-speaking as well as 5% Turkic, and Persian as the standard.

=== Population ===
At the time of the 2006 National Census, the city's population was 3,594 in 1,079 households. The following census in 2011 counted 3,646 people in 1,783 households. The 2016 census measured the population of the city as 3,441 people in 1,220 households.
