= Rudboneh Rural District =

Rural district in Gilan province, Iran

Rudboneh Rural District Persian: دهستان رودبنه
- Rural District
- Location within Iran
- Coordinates: 37°17′N 50°04′E
- Country: Iran
- Province: Gilan
- County: Lahijan
- District: Rudboneh
- Established: 1987
- Capital: Rudboneh

Population (2016)
  - Total: 6,858
- Time zone: UTC+3:30 (IRST)

Rudboneh Rural District (Persian: دهستان رودبنه) is in Rudboneh District of Lahijan County, in northwestern Iran's Gilan province. It is administered from the city of Rudboneh.

== Demographics ==
=== Population ===
At the time of the 2006 National Census, the rural district's population was 11,893 in 3,519 households. There were 7,598 inhabitants in 2,514 households at the following census of 2011. The 2016 census measured the population of the rural district as 6,858 in 2,533 households. The most populous of its 17 villages was Pahmadan, with 1,682 people.

=== Other villages in the rural district ===
- Akbarabad
- Charuq Duz Mahalleh
- Golchal
- Hajj Salim Mahalleh
- Ishgah
- Kanaf Gurab
- Kohneh Rudposht
- Lakmeh Sar
- Mehdiabad
- Mian Mahalleh-ye Rudboneh
- Pain Mahalleh-ye Rudboneh
- Raiyyat Mahalleh
- Seda Poshteh
- Sharafshadeh
- Sheykh Ali Kalayeh
- Yusef Deh
