= Chapar Khaneh Rural District =

Rural district in Gilan province, Iran

Chapar Khaneh Rural District Persian: دهستان چاپار خانه
- Rural District
- Location within Iran
- Coordinates: 37°26′N 49°38′E
- Country: Iran
- Province: Gilan
- County: Khomam
- District: Central
- Established: 1987
- Capital: Chapar Khaneh

Population (2016)
  - Total: 9,967
- Time zone: UTC+3:30 (IRST)

Chapar Khaneh Rural District (Persian: دهستان چاپار خانه) is in the Central District of Khomam County, Gilan province, in Iran. Its capital is the village of Chapar Khaneh.

== Demographics ==
=== Population ===
At the time of the 2006 National Census, the rural district's population (as a part of the former Khomam District of Rasht County) was 11,620 in 3,439 households. There were 10,774 inhabitants in 3,537 households at the following census of 2011. The 2016 census measured the population of the rural district as 9,967 in 3,542 households. The most populous of its 15 villages was Fashtakeh, with 1,901 people.

In 2020, the district was separated from the county in the establishment of Khomam County, and the rural district was transferred to the new Central District.

=== Other villages in the rural district ===
- Dahaneh Sar-e Sheyjan
- Fatatu
- Gholamreza Bagh
- Gurab Jir
- Jefrud-e Bala
- Mian Mahalleh-ye Sheyjan
- Poshtsan-e Gurab Jir
- Rasteh Kenar-e Sheyjan
- Sheyjan
- Tazehabad-e Sadar
- Tukesar-e Sheyjan
- Zarang Mahalleh
- Zir Deh
