= Eshkik Rural District =

Rural district in Gilan province, Iran

Eshkik Rural District Persian: دهستان اشکیک
- Rural District
- Location within Iran
- Coordinates: 37°23′N 49°38′E
- Country: Iran
- Province: Gilan
- County: Khomam
- District: Chukam
- Established: 1987
- Capital: Eshkik

Population (2016)
  - Total: 13,533
- Time zone: UTC+3:30 (IRST)

Eshkik Rural District (Persian: دهستان اشکیک) (Note: Formerly Chukam Rural District (دهستان چوكام)) is in Chukam District of Khomam County, Gilan province, Iran. Its capital is the village of Eshkik. The previous capital of the rural district was the village of Bala Mahalleh-ye Chukam, now the city of Chukam.

== Demographics ==
=== Population ===
At the time of the 2006 National Census, the rural district's population (as Chukam Rural District of the former Khomam District in Rasht County) was 15,772 in 4,388 households. There were 14,314 inhabitants in 4,572 households at the following census of 2011. The 2016 census measured the population of the rural district as 13,533 in 4,576 households. The most populous of its 13 villages was Bala Mahalleh-ye Chukam (now the city of Chukam), with 3,096 residents.

In 2020, the district was separated from the county in the establishment of Khomam County, and the rural district was transferred to the new Chukam District.

=== Other villages in the rural district ===
- Balaskaleh
- Khachekin
- Mesr Dasht
- Tazehabad-e Khachekin
