= Chukam District =

District in Gilan province, Iran

Chukam District Persian: بخش چوکام
- District
- Location within Iran
- Coordinates: 37°23′N 49°37′E
- Country: Iran
- Province: Gilan
- County: Khomam
- Established: 2020
- Capital: Chukam
- Time zone: UTC+3:30 (IRST)

Chukam District (Persian: بخش چوکام) is in Khomam County, in Iran's northwestern Gilan province. Its capital is the city of Chukam, whose population at the time of the 2016 National Census was 3,096 in 1,019 households.

== History ==
In 2020, Khomam District was separated from Rasht County in the establishment of Khomam County, which was divided into two districts of two rural districts each, with Khomam as its capital and only city at the time. The village of Chukam was converted to a city in 2023.

== Demographics ==
=== Administrative divisions ===
Chukam District
Administrative Divisions
Eshkik RD (Note: Formerly Chukam Rural District)
Forshki RD
Chukam (city) (Note: Became a city after the 2016 census)
RD = Rural District
