= Shirju Posht Rural District =

Rural district in Gilan province, Iran

Shirju Posht Rural District Persian: دهستان شيرجو پشت
- Rural District
- Location within Iran
- Coordinates: 37°19′N 50°09′E
- Country: Iran
- Province: Gilan
- County: Lahijan
- District: Rudboneh
- Established: 1987
- Capital: Bala Mahalleh-ye Naser Kiadeh

Population (2016)
  - Total: 12,953
- Time zone: UTC+3:30 (IRST)

Shirju Posht Rural District (Persian: دهستان شيرجو پشت) is in Rudboneh District of Lahijan County, in northwestern Iran's Gilan province. Its capital is the village of Bala Mahalleh-ye Naser Kiadeh.

== Demographics ==
=== Population ===
At the time of the 2006 National Census, the rural district's population was 15,716 in 4,711 households. There were 14,107 inhabitants in 4,787 households at the following census of 2011. The 2016 census measured the population of the rural district as 12,953 in 4,896 households. The most populous of its 29 villages was Barku Sara, with 1,368 people.

=== Other villages in the rural district ===
- Bala Rudposht
- Beyn Kalayeh
- Gaviyeh
- Hasan Ali Deh
- Hasan Bekandeh
- Kachelam
- Kurandeh
- Sarajar
