= Central District (Khomam County) =

District in Gilan province, Iran

Central District (Khomam County) Persian: بخش مرکزی شهرستان خمام
- District
- Location within Iran
- Coordinates: 37°23′N 49°39′E
- Country: Iran
- Province: Gilan
- County: Khomam
- Established: 2020
- Capital: Khomam
- Time zone: UTC+3:30 (IRST)

The Central District of Khomam County (Persian: بخش مرکزی شهرستان خمام) is in Iran's northwestern Gilan province. Its capital is the city of Khomam, whose population at the time of the 2016 National Census was 20,897 in 7,143 households.

== History ==
In 2020, Khomam District was separated from Rasht County in the establishment of Khomam County, which was divided into two districts of two rural districts each, with Khomam as its capital and only city at the time.

== Demographics ==
=== Administrative divisions ===
Central District (Khomam County)
Administrative Divisions
Chapar Khaneh RD
Kateh Sar-e Khomam RD
Khomam (city)
RD = Rural District
