= Khomam County =

County in Gilan province, Iran

Khomam County Persian: شهرستان خمام
- County
- Location of Khomam County in Gilan province (top center, purple)

- Location of Gilan province in Iran
- Coordinates: 37°24′N 49°39′E
- Country: Iran
- Province: Gilan
- Established: 2020
- Capital: Khomam
- Districts: Central, Chukam
- Time zone: UTC+3:30 (IRST)

Khomam County (Persian: شهرستان خمام) is in Iran's northwestern Gilan province. Its capital is the city of Khomam, whose population at the time of the 2016 National Census was 20,897 in 7,143 households.

== History ==
In 2020, Khomam District was separated from Rasht County in the establishment of Khomam County, which was divided into two districts of two rural districts each, with Khomam as its capital and only city at the time. The village of Chukam was converted to a city in 2023.

== Demographics ==
=== Administrative divisions ===
Khomam County's administrative structure is shown in the following table.

Khomam County
Administrative Divisions
Central District
Chapar Khaneh RD
Kateh Sar-e Khomam RD
Khomam (city)
Chukam District
Eshkik RD (Note: Formerly Chukam Rural District)
Forshki RD
Chukam (city) (Note: Became a city after the 2016 census)
RD = Rural District

== See also ==
Media related to Khomam County at Wikimedia Commons
