= Rudboneh District =

District in Gilan province, Iran

Rudboneh District Persian: بخش رودبنه
- District
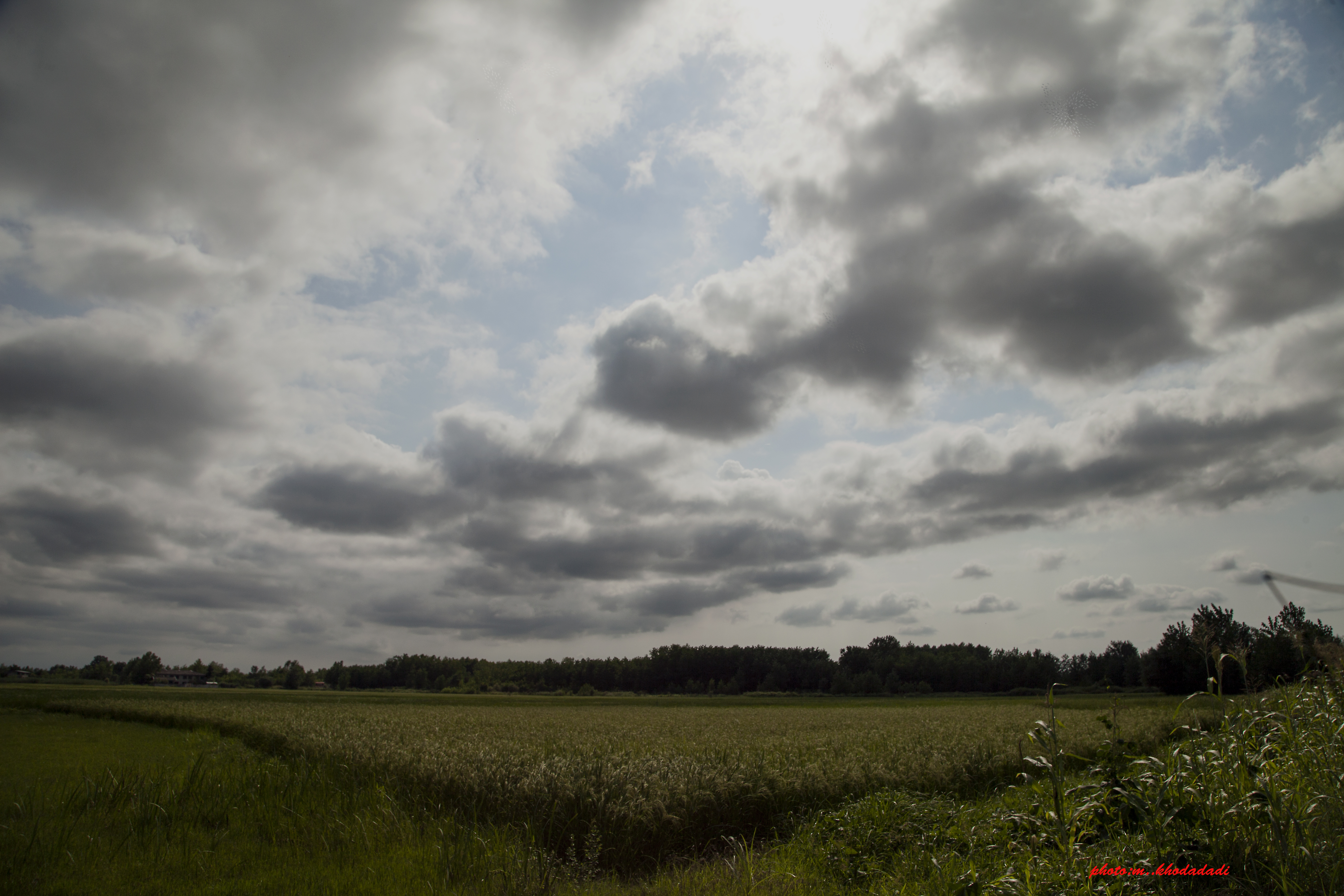
- Rice fields in Rudboneh

- Location within Iran
- Coordinates: 37°19′N 50°06′E
- Country: Iran
- Province: Gilan
- County: Lahijan
- Established: 1997
- Capital: Rudboneh

Population (2016)
  - Total: 23,252
- Time zone: UTC+3:30 (IRST)

Rudboneh District (Persian: بخش رودبنه) is in Lahijan County in northwestern Iran's Gilan province. Its capital is the city of Rudboneh.

== Demographics ==
=== Population ===
At the time of the 2006 National Census, the district's population was 31,203 in 9,309 households. The following census in 2011 counted 25,351 people in 8,509 households. The 2016 census measured the population of the district as 23,252 inhabitants in 8,649 households.

=== Administrative divisions ===
Rudboneh District Population
Administrative Divisions	2006	2011	2016
Rudboneh RD	11,893	7,598	6,858
Shirju Posht RD	15,716	14,107	12,953
Rudboneh (city)	3,594	3,646	3,441
Total	31,203	25,351	23,252
RD = Rural District
