= Khomam District =

Former district in Gilan province, Iran

Khomam District Persian: بخش خمام
- Former District
- Location within Iran
- Coordinates: 37°24′N 49°39′E
- Country: Iran
- Province: Gilan
- County: Rasht
- Capital: Khomam

Population (2016)
  - Total: 54,860
- Time zone: UTC+3:30 (IRST)

Khomam District (Persian: بخش خمام) is a former administrative division of Rasht County, Gilan province, Iran. Its capital was the city of Khomam.

== History ==
In 2020, the district was separated from the county in the establishment of Khomam County.

== Demographics ==
=== Population ===
At the time of the 2006 National Census, the district's population was 52,050 in 15,059 households. The following census in 2011 counted 53,600 people in 17,492 households. The 2016 census measured the population of the district as 54,860 inhabitants in 18,948 households.

=== Administrative divisions ===
Khomam District Population
Administrative Divisions	2006	2011	2016
Chapar Khaneh RD	11,620	10,774	9,967
Chukam RD	15,772	14,314	13,533
Kateh Sar-e Khomam RD	11,757	11,406	10,463
Khomam (city)	12,901	17,106	20,897
Total	52,050	53,600	54,860
RD: Rural District
