= Bandbon-e Ujargah =

Bandbon-e Vajargah بندبن واجارگاه
- Neighborhood
- Location within Iran
- Coordinates: 37°01′37″N 50°23′55″E
- Country: Iran
- Province: Gilan
- County: Rudsar
- Bakhsh: Kelachay
- City: Vajargah

Population (2006)
  - Total: 389
- Time zone: UTC+3:30 (IRST)

Bandbon-e Ujargah (Persian: بندبن واجارگاه, also Romanized as Bandbon-e Ūjārgāh; also known as Bandbon-e Ojārgāh) is a neighborhood in the city of Vajargah in Rudsar County, Gilan Province, Iran.

Formerly, it was a village in Bibalan Rural District in Kelachay District. At the 2006 census, its population was 389, in 110 families.
