= Shemshad Poshteh =

Village in Gilan Province

Shemshad Poshteh شمشادپشته
- Village
- Location within Iran
- Coordinates: 36°57′24″N 50°31′56″E
- Country: Iran
- Province: Gilan
- County: Rudsar
- Bakhsh: Chaboksar
- Rural District: Owshiyan

Population (2006)
  - Total: 31
- Time zone: UTC+3:30 (IRST)
  - Summer (DST): UTC+4:30 (IRDT)

Shemshad Poshteh (Persian: شمشادپشته, also Romanized as Shemshād Poshteh) is a village located in Owshiyan Rural District, Chaboksar District, Rudsar County, Gilan Province, Iran. According to the 2006 census, its population was 31, comprising 8 families.
