= Bijar Poshteh =

Neighborhood in Gilan province, Iran

Bijar Poshteh Persian: بيجارپشته
- Neighborhood
- Location within Iran
- Coordinates: 37°01′25″N 50°22′48″E
- Country: Iran
- Province: Gilan
- County: Rudsar
- District: Kelachay
- Rural District: Bibalan
- Village: Selakjan

Population (2016)
  - Total: 130
- Time zone: UTC+3:30 (IRST)

Bijar Poshteh (Persian: بيجارپشته) (Note: Also romanized as Bījār Poshteh) is a neighborhood in the village of Selakjan in Bibalan Rural District of Kelachay District in Rudsar County, Gilan province, Iran.

== Demographics ==
=== Population ===
At the time of the 2006 National Census, Bijar Poshteh's population was 142 in 42 households, when it was a village in Bibalan Rural District. The following census in 2011 counted 125 people in 43 households. The 2016 census measured the population of the village as 130 people in 46 households.

In 2023, the villages of Bijar Poshteh and Lateh were merged with the village of Selakjan.
