= Lateh, Rudsar =

Neighborhood in Gilan province, Iran

Lateh Persian: لاته
- Neighborhood
- Location within Iran
- Country: Iran
- Province: Gilan
- County: Rudsar
- District: Kelachay
- Rural District: Bibalan
- Village: Selakjan

Population (2016)
  - Total: 77
- Time zone: UTC+3:30 (IRST)

Lateh (Persian: لاته) (Note: Also romanized as Lāteh) is a neighborhood in the village of Selakjan in Bibalan Rural District of Kelachay District in Rudsar County, Gilan province, Iran.

== Demographics ==
=== Population ===
At the time of the 2006 National Census, Lateh's population was 89 in 28 households, when it was a village in Bibalan Rural District. The following census in 2011 counted 50 people in 14 households. The 2016 census measured the population of the village as 77 people in 27 households.

In 2023, the villages of Bijar Poshteh and Lateh were merged with the village of Selakjan.
