= Vajargah =

City in Gilan province, Iran

Vajargah Persian: واجارگاه
- City
- Location within Iran
- Coordinates: 37°02′24″N 50°24′24″E
- Country: Iran
- Province: Gilan
- County: Rudsar
- District: Kelachay
- Established as a city: 1965

Population (2016)
  - Total: 4,537
- Time zone: UTC+3:30 (IRST)

Vajargah (Persian: واجارگاه) (Note: Also romanized as Vājārgāh; also known as Owndīm Sarā; Gilaki: واجارگه) is a city in Kelachay District of Rudsar County, Gilan province, Iran.

== History ==
The old Vajargah village, which was in Deylaman region (now Otaqvar District), had between 10-20 households. It consisted of two neighborhoods: "Jur Vajargah" (Gilaki: جور واجارگاه, meaning upper Vajargah) whose residents were active in livestock keeping, and "Jir Vajargah" (Gilaki: جیر واجارگاه, meaning lower Vajargah) whose residents were involved in farming.

One of the families migrated east to Kelachay region, purchasing lands and settling there. They also named their new place after their homeland, Vajargah, consisting of five neighborhoods: Jur Sareh, Min Sareh, Jir Sareh, Own Dim Sareh, Amirali Sareh.

Over time, due to the fertile soil of the area, "Vajargah" became a new place for farming and agricultural activities, and its population increased, gradually becoming a concentrated, city-like settlement. The residents of the new areas, who were scattered across vast tracts of land, formed neighborhoods for themselves, which are known today as Bandbon, Salim Sara, Baghdasht, Gav Mast, etc.

The first school in Vajargah was established in 1949. In 1950s several tea factories were built in Vajargah, making it one of the largest employment and economic centers in the Kalachay and eastern Gilan regions and one of the largest center of tea factories.

Vajargah city municipality was established in 1965.

== Demographics ==
=== Population ===
At the time of the 2006 National Census, the village's population was 2,974 in 893 households. The following census in 2011 counted 4,522 people in 1,434 households. The 2016 census measured the population of the village as 4,537 people in 1,563 households.
