= Javaher Dasht =

Javaher Dasht جواهردشت(Jor Dasht)
- village
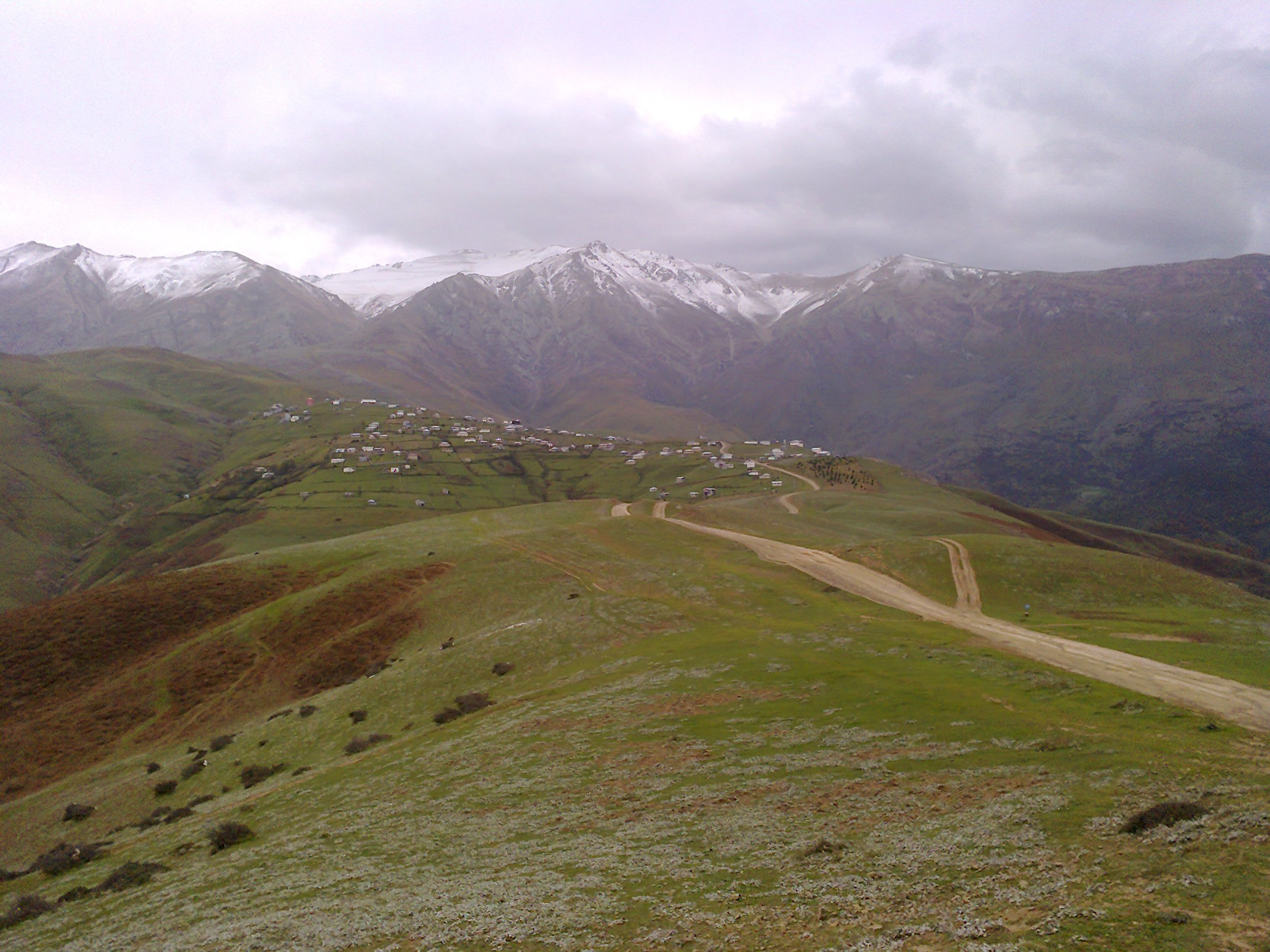

- Location within Iran
- Coordinates: 36°53′36″N 50°22′26″E
- Country: Iran
- Province: Gilan
- County: Rudsar
- Bakhsh: Chaboksar
- Rural District: Siahkalrud
- Time zone: UTC+3:30 (IRST)
- Website: www.javaherdasht.ir

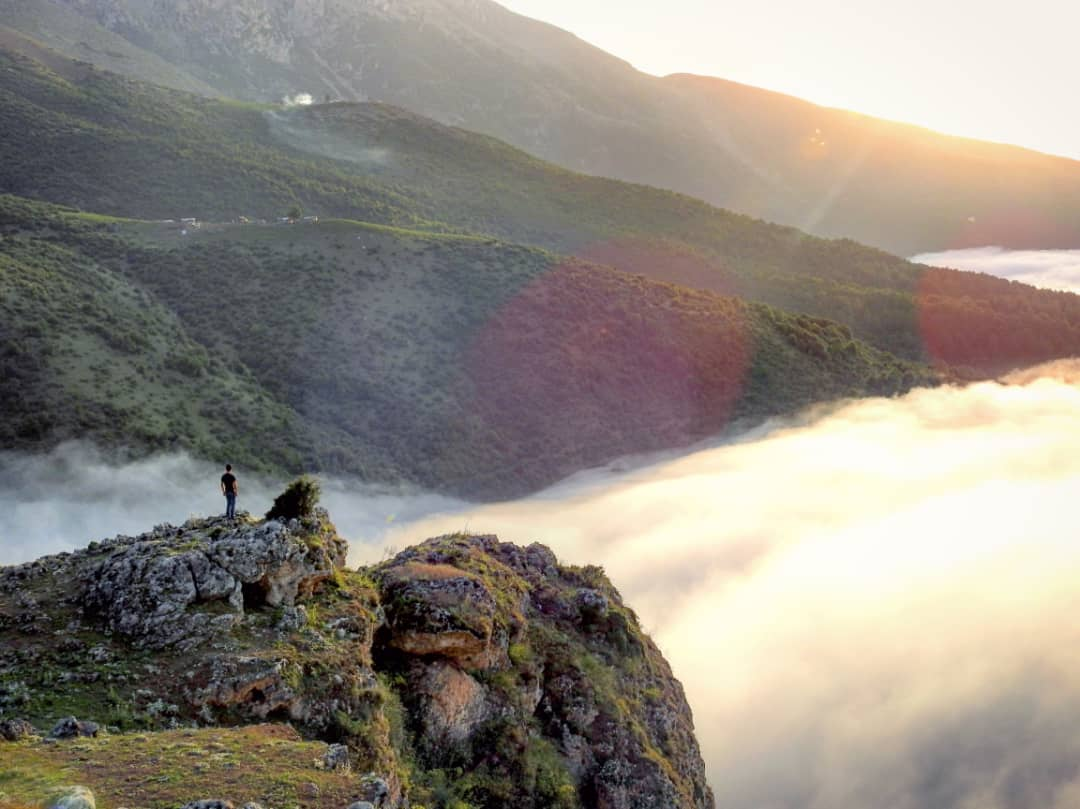
Javaher Dasht

Javaher Dasht (Persian: جواهردشت, Gilaki: جؤردشت, romanized: Jor Dasht, also Romanized as Javāher Dasht and Jor Dasht) is a village in Siahkalrud Rural District, Chaboksar District, Rudsar County, Gilan Province, Iran.

At the 2006 census, its existence was noted, but its population was not reported.
