= Sejubsar =

Sejubsar سجوبسر
- Village
- Location within Iran
- Coordinates: 37°03′24″N 50°19′26″E
- Country: Iran
- Province: Gilan
- County: Rudsar
- Bakhsh: Kelachay
- Rural District: Machian

Population (2006)
  - Total: 54
- Time zone: UTC+3:30 (IRST)
  - Summer (DST): UTC+4:30 (IRDT)

Sejubsar (Persian: سجوبسر, also Romanized as Sejūbsar; also known as Seh Jūbsar) is a village in Machian Rural District, Kelachay District, Rudsar County, Gilan Province, Iran. At the 2006 census, its population was 54, in 15 families.
