= Sheykh Zahed Mahalleh =

Sheykh Zahed Mahalleh شيخ زاهدمحله
- Village
- Location within Iran
- Coordinates: 36°58′31″N 50°32′44″E
- Country: Iran
- Province: Gilan
- County: Rudsar
- Bakhsh: Chaboksar
- Rural District: Owshiyan

Population (2006)
  - Total: 77
- Time zone: UTC+3:30 (IRST)
  - Summer (DST): UTC+4:30 (IRDT)

Sheykh Zahed Mahalleh (Persian: شيخ زاهدمحله, also Romanized as Sheykh Zāhed Maḩalleh) is a village in Owshiyan Rural District, Chaboksar District, Rudsar County, Gilan Province, Iran. At the 2006 census, its population was 77, in 19 families.
