= Chenar Bon, Gilan =

Village in Gilan province, Iran

Chenar Bon Persian: چناربن
- Village
- Location within Iran
- Country: Iran
- Province: Gilan
- County: Rudsar
- District: Kelachay
- Rural District: Machian

Population (2016)
  - Total: 153
- Time zone: UTC+3:30 (IRST)

Chenar Bon (Persian: چناربن) (Note: Also romanized as Chenār Bon) is a village in Machian Rural District of Kelachay District in Rudsar County, Gilan province, Iran.

== Demographics ==
=== Population ===
At the time of the 2006 National Census, the village's population was 149 in 49 households. The following census in 2011 counted 142 people in 49 households. The 2016 census measured the population of the village as 153 people in 63 households.

In 2023, the villages of Kudakan and Soltan Sara were merged with the village of Chenar Bon.
