= Kand-e Bon =

Kand-e Bon كندبن
- Village
- Location within Iran
- Coordinates: 37°03′28″N 50°21′03″E
- Country: Iran
- Province: Gilan
- County: Rudsar
- Bakhsh: Kelachay
- Rural District: Machian

Population (2006)
  - Total: 62
- Time zone: UTC+3:30 (IRST)
  - Summer (DST): UTC+4:30 (IRDT)

Kand-e Bon (Persian: كندبن, Gilaki: کند ٚ بۊن) is a village in Machian Rural District, Kelachay District, Rudsar County, Gilan Province, Iran. At the 2006 census, its population was 62, in 13 families.
