= Sarsar =

Sarsar or Sar Sar (Persian: سارسر) may refer to:

- Sarsar, Bibalan, Rudsar County, Gilan Province
- Sar Sar, Machian, Rudsar County, Gilan Province
- Sarsar, Kohgiluyeh and Boyer-Ahmad
