= Dugol-e Sara =

Dugol-e Sara دوگل سرا
- Village
- Location within Iran
- Coordinates: 37°03′37″N 50°23′01″E
- Country: Iran
- Province: Gilan
- County: Rudsar
- Bakhsh: Kelachay
- Rural District: Bibalan

Population (2006)
  - Total: 465
- Time zone: UTC+3:30 (IRST)
  - Summer (DST): UTC+4:30 (IRDT)

Dugol-e Sara (Persian: دوگل سرا, also Romanized as Dūgol-e Sarā; also known as Dogol-e Sarā) is a village in Bibalan Rural District, Kelachay District, Rudsar County, Gilan Province, Iran. At the 2006 census, its population was 465, in 131 families.
