= Zangulbareh =

Zangulbareh زنگول بره
- Village
- Location within Iran
- Coordinates: 37°02′50″N 50°17′09″E
- Country: Iran
- Province: Gilan
- County: Rudsar
- Bakhsh: Kelachay
- Rural District: Machian

Population (2006)
  - Total: 71
- Time zone: UTC+3:30 (IRST)
  - Summer (DST): UTC+4:30 (IRDT)

Zangulbareh (Persian: زنگول بره, also Romanized as Zangūlbareh; also known as Zangolbareh) is a village in Machian Rural District, Kelachay District, Rudsar County, Gilan Province, Iran. At the 2006 census, its population was 71, in 21 families.
