= Kudakan =

Neighborhood in Gilan province, Iran

Kudakan Persian: كودكان
- Neighborhood
- Location within Iran
- Country: Iran
- Province: Gilan
- County: Rudsar
- District: Kelachay
- Rural District: Machian
- Village: Chenar Bon

Population (2016)
  - Total: 28
- Time zone: UTC+3:30 (IRST)

Kudakan (Persian: كودكان) (Note: Also romanized as Kūdakān) is a neighborhood in the village of Chenar Bon in Machian Rural District of Kelachay District in Rudsar County, Gilan province, Iran.

== Demographics ==
=== Population ===
At the time of the 2006 National Census, Kudakan's population was 149 in 49 households, when it was a village in Machian Rural District. The following census in 2011 counted 43 people in 16 households. The 2016 census measured the population of the village as 28 people in 10 households.

In 2023, the villages of Kudakan and Soltan Sara were merged with the village of Chenar Bon.
