= Palat Kaleh Sar =

Palat Kaleh Sar پلت‌کله‌سر
- Village
- Location within Iran
- Coordinates: 36°58′21″N 50°26′36″E
- Country: Iran
- Province: Gilan
- County: Rudsar
- Bakhsh: Chaboksar
- Rural District: Siahkalrud

Population (2006)
  - Total: 69
- Time zone: UTC+3:30 (IRST)
  - Summer (DST): UTC+4:30 (IRDT)

Palat Kaleh Sar (Persian: پلت‌کله‌سر) is a village in Siahkalrud Rural District, Chaboksar District, Rudsar County, Gilan Province, Iran. At the 2006 census, its population was 69, in 24 families.
