= Soltan Sara =

Neighborhood in Gilan province, Iran

Soltan Sara Persian: سلطانسرا
- Neighborhood
- Location within Iran
- Country: Iran
- Province: Gilan
- County: Rudsar
- District: Kelachay
- Rural District: Machian
- Village: Chenar Bon

Population (2016)
  - Total: 29
- Time zone: UTC+3:30 (IRST)

Soltan Sara (Persian: سلطانسرا) (Note: Also romanized as Solţān Sarā) is a neighborhood in the village of Chenar Bon in Machian Rural District of Kelachay District in Rudsar County, Gilan province, Iran.

== Demographics ==
=== Population ===
At the time of the 2006 National Census, Soltan Sara's population was 42 in 15 households, when it was a village in Machian Rural District. The following census in 2011 counted 45 people in 16 households. The 2016 census measured the population of the village as 29 people in 10 households.

In 2023, the villages of Kudakan and Soltan Sara were merged with the village of Chenar Bon.
