= Gol Mahalleh =

Gol Mahalleh or Gel Mahalleh (Persian: گل محله) may refer to:

- Gol Mahalleh, Rudsar, Gilan Province
- Gol Mahalleh, Chaboksar, Rudsar County, Gilan Province
- Gol Mahalleh, Babol, Mazandaran Province
- Gel Mahalleh, Juybar, Mazandaran Province
- Gol Mahalleh, Mahmudabad, Mazandaran Province
