= Siahkalrud =

Village in Gilan province, Iran

Siahkalrud Persian: سياهكلرود
- Village
- Location within Iran
- Coordinates: 37°01′22″N 50°26′23″E
- Country: Iran
- Province: Gilan
- County: Rudsar
- District: Chaboksar
- Rural District: Siahkalrud

Population (2016)
  - Total: 650
- Time zone: UTC+3:30 (IRST)

Siahkalrud (Persian: سياهكلرود) (Note: Also romanized as Seyāhkalarūd and Sīāhkalrūd; also known as Oţāqvar) is a village in Siahkalrud Rural District (Note: Formerly Owshiyan and Siahkalrud Rural District) of Chaboksar District in Rudsar County, Gilan province, Iran.

== Demographics ==
=== Population ===
At the time of the 2006 National Census, the village's population was 793 in 249 households. The following census in 2011 counted 757 people in 249 households. The 2016 census measured the population of the village as 650 people in 242 households.
