= Owshiyan =

Village in Gilan province, Iran

Owshiyan Persian: اوشيان
- Village
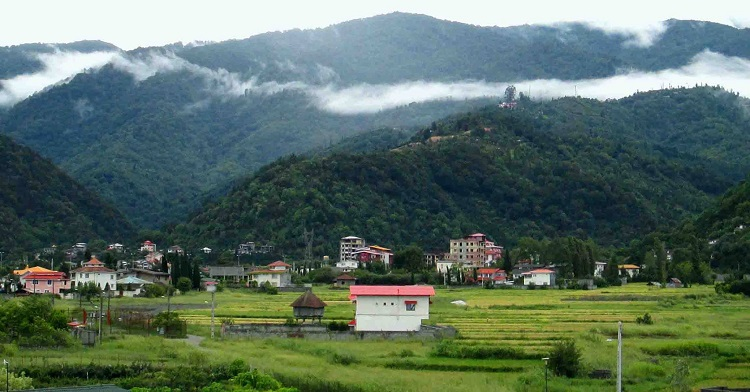
- The village of Owshiyan

- Location within Iran
- Coordinates: 36°59′36″N 50°30′48″E
- Country: Iran
- Province: Gilan
- County: Rudsar
- District: Chaboksar
- Rural District: Owshiyan

Population (2016)
  - Total: 1,675
- Time zone: UTC+3:30 (IRST)

Owshiyan (Persian: اوشيان) (Note: Also romanized as Owshīyān) is a village in Owshiyan Rural District of Chaboksar District in Rudsar County, Gilan province, Iran.

== Demographics ==
=== Population ===
At the time of the 2006 National Census, the village's population was 1,493 in 409 households. The following census in 2011 counted 1,917 people in 595 households. The 2016 census measured the population of the village as 1,675 people in 578 households.
