= Kalan Kalayeh =

Village in Gilan province, Iran

Kalan Kalayeh Persian: كلن كلايه
- Village
- Location within Iran
- Coordinates: 37°02′49″N 50°17′28″E
- Country: Iran
- Province: Gilan
- County: Rudsar
- District: Kelachay
- Rural District: Machian

Population (2016)
  - Total: 418
- Time zone: UTC+3:30 (IRST)

Kalan Kalayeh (Persian: كلن كلايه) (Note: Also romanized as Kalān Kalāyeh and Kalan Kalāyeh) is a village in Machian Rural District of Kelachay District in Rudsar County, Gilan province, Iran.

== Demographics ==
=== Population ===
At the time of the 2006 National Census, the village's population was 532 in 144 households. The following census in 2011 counted 566 people in 168 households. The 2016 census measured the population of the village as 418 people in 165 households.
