= Dehkadeh Qods =

Village in Gilan province, Iran

Dehkadeh Qods Persian: دهكده قدس
- Village
- Location within Iran
- Coordinates: 37°02′12″N 50°21′49″E
- Country: Iran
- Province: Gilan
- County: Rudsar
- District: Kelachay
- Rural District: Bibalan

Population (2016)
  - Total: 677
- Time zone: UTC+3:30 (IRST)

Dehkadeh Qods (Persian: دهكده قدس) is a village in Bibalan Rural District of Kelachay District in Rudsar County, Gilan province, Iran.

== Demographics ==
=== Population ===
At the time of the 2006 National Census, the village's population was 356 in 98 households. The following census in 2011 counted 483 people in 142 households. The 2016 census measured the population of the village as 677 people in 206 households.
