= Shad Morad Mahalleh, Chaboksar =

Village in Gilan province, Iran

Shad Morad Mahalleh Persian: شادمرادمحله
- Village
- Location within Iran
- Coordinates: 37°01′49″N 50°26′38″E
- Country: Iran
- Province: Gilan
- County: Rudsar
- District: Chaboksar
- Rural District: Siahkalrud

Population (2016)
  - Total: 339
- Time zone: UTC+3:30 (IRST)

Shad Morad Mahalleh (Persian: شادمرادمحله) (Note: Also romanized as Shād Morād Maḩalleh; also known as Sādāt Maḩalleh and Shāh Morād Maḩalleh) is a village in Siahkalrud Rural District (Note: Formerly Owshiyan and Siahkalrud Rural District) of Chaboksar District in Rudsar County, Gilan province, Iran.

== Demographics ==
=== Population ===
At the time of the 2006 National Census, the village's population was 264 in 83 households. The following census in 2011 counted 266 people in 93 households. The 2016 census measured the population of the village as 339 people in 128 households.
