= Bandbon-e Qasemabad =

Village in Gilan province, Iran

Bandbon-e Qasemabad Persian: بند بن قاسم آباد
- Village
- Location within Iran
- Coordinates: 37°01′04″N 50°27′14″E
- Country: Iran
- Province: Gilan
- County: Rudsar
- District: Chaboksar
- Rural District: Owshiyan

Population (2016)
  - Total: 473
- Time zone: UTC+3:30 (IRST)

Bandbon-e Qasemabad (Persian: بند بن قاسم آباد) (Note: Also romanized as Bandbon-e Qāsemābād) is a village in Owshiyan Rural District of Chaboksar District in Rudsar County, Gilan province, Iran.

== Demographics ==
=== Population ===
At the time of the 2006 National Census, the village's population was 553 in 176 households. The following census in 2011 counted 576 people in 196 households. The 2016 census measured the population of the village as 473 people in 168 households.
