= Chaykhansar =

Village in Gilan province, Iran

Chaykhansar Persian: چايخانسر
- Village
- Location within Iran
- Coordinates: 37°02′18″N 50°27′03″E
- Country: Iran
- Province: Gilan
- County: Rudsar
- District: Chaboksar
- Rural District: Siahkalrud

Population (2016)
  - Total: 802
- Time zone: UTC+3:30 (IRST)

Chaykhansar (Persian: چايخانسر) (Note: Also known as Chākhānehsar, Chākhānesar, Chakhānī, and Chakhānī Sar) is a village in Siahkalrud Rural District (Note: Formerly Owshiyan and Siahkalrud Rural District) of Chaboksar District in Rudsar County, Gilan province, Iran.

== Demographics ==
=== Population ===
At the time of the 2006 National Census, the village's population was 981 in 316 households. The following census in 2011 counted 934 people in 330 households. The 2016 census measured the population of the village as 802 people in 294 households.
