= Gav Mast =

Gav Mast گاوماست
- Village
- Location within Iran
- Coordinates: 37°01′40″N 50°25′24″E
- Country: Iran
- Province: Gilan
- County: Rudsar
- Bakhsh: Kelachay
- Rural District: Bibalan

Population (2006)
  - Total: 436
- Time zone: UTC+3:30 (IRST)
  - Summer (DST): UTC+4:30 (IRDT)

Gav Mast (Persian: گاوماست, also Romanized as Gāv Māst) is a village in Bibalan Rural District, Kelachay District, Rudsar County, Gilan Province, Iran. As of the 2006 census, it had a population of 436, in 117 families.
