= Duran, Iran =

Village in Gilan province, Iran

Duran Persian: دوران
- Village
- Location within Iran
- Coordinates: 36°59′20″N 50°32′07″E
- Country: Iran
- Province: Gilan
- County: Rudsar
- District: Chaboksar
- Rural District: Owshiyan

Population (2016)
  - Total: 417
- Time zone: UTC+3:30 (IRST)

Duran (Persian: دوران) is a village in Owshiyan Rural District of Chaboksar District in Rudsar County, Gilan province, Iran.

== Demographics ==
=== Population ===
The village did not appear in the 2006 National Census. The following census in 2011 counted 462 people in 145 households. The 2016 census measured the population of the village as 417 people in 138 households.
