= Selakjan =

Selakjan (Persian: سلاكجان) may refer to:

- Selakjan, Rudsar
- Selakjan, Kelachay, Rudsar County
