= Bala Mahalleh-ye Qasemabad =

Village in Gilan province, Iran

Bala Mahalleh-ye Qasemabad Persian: بالا محله قاسم آباد
- Village
- Location within Iran
- Coordinates: 37°00′46″N 50°27′41″E
- Country: Iran
- Province: Gilan
- County: Rudsar
- District: Chaboksar
- Rural District: Owshiyan

Population (2016)
  - Total: 771
- Time zone: UTC+3:30 (IRST)

Bala Mahalleh-ye Qasemabad (Persian: بالا محله قاسم آباد) (Note: Also romanized as Bālā Maḩalleh-ye Qāsemābād; also known as Qāsemābād, Qāsemābād-e Bālā, Qāsemābād ‘Olyā, and Qasemābād-e ‘Olyā) is a village in Owshiyan Rural District of Chaboksar District in Rudsar County, Gilan province, Iran.

== Demographics ==
=== Population ===
At the time of the 2006 National Census, the village's population was 917 in 274 households. The following census in 2011 counted 933 people in 301 households. The 2016 census measured the population of the village as 771 people in 271 households.
