= Tuska Mahalleh-ye Qasemabad =

Village in Gilan province, Iran

Tuska Mahalleh-ye Qasemabad Persian: توسکا محله قاسم آباد، توسکا
- Village
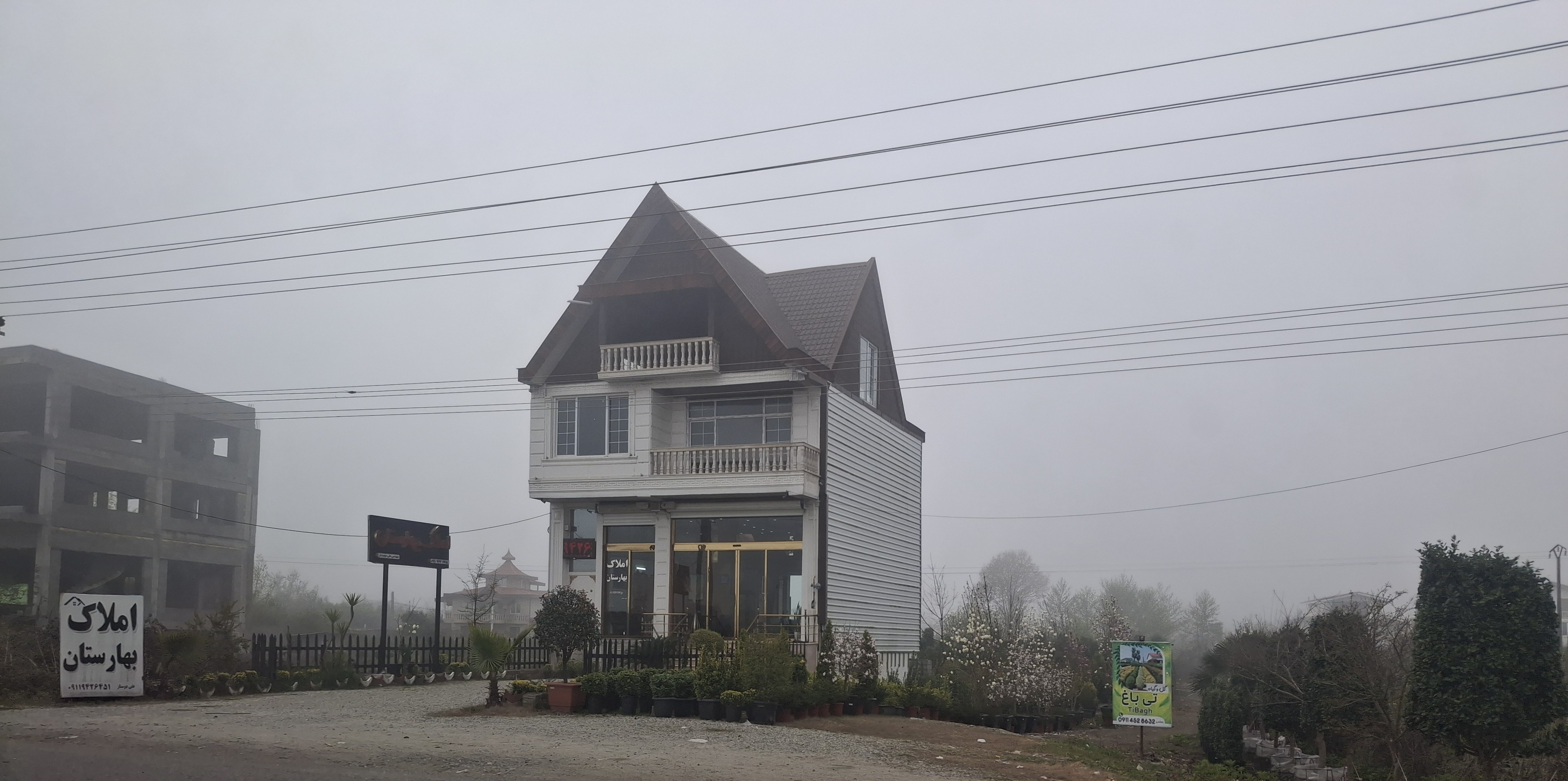

- Location within Iran
- Coordinates: 37°00′49″N 50°28′45″E
- Country: Iran
- Province: Gilan
- County: Rudsar
- District: Chaboksar
- Rural District: Owshiyan

Population (2016)
  - Total: 432
- Time zone: UTC+3:30 (IRST)

Tuska Mahalleh-ye Qasemabad (Persian: توسکا محله قاسم آباد) (Note: Also romanized as Tuskā Maḩalleh-ye Qāsemābād; also known as Tuskā and Tuskā Maḩalle) is a village in Owshiyan Rural District of Chaboksar District in Rudsar County, Gilan province, Iran.

== Demographics ==
=== Population ===
At the time of the 2006 National Census, the village's population was 444 in 117 households. The following census in 2011 counted 434 people in 145 households. The 2016 census measured the population of the village as 432 people in 158 households.
