= Bala Gazaf Rud =

Village in Gilan province, Iran

Bala Gazaf Rud Persian: بالاگزافرود
- Village
- Location within Iran
- Coordinates: 37°04′11″N 50°23′18″E
- Country: Iran
- Province: Gilan
- County: Rudsar
- District: Kelachay
- Rural District: Bibalan

Population (2016)
  - Total: 443
- Time zone: UTC+3:30 (IRST)

Bala Gazaf Rud (Persian: بالاگزاف رود) (Note: Also romanized as Bālā Gazāf Rūd; also known as Gazāf Rūd) is a village in Bibalan Rural District of Kelachay District in Rudsar County, Gilan province, Iran.

== Demographics ==
=== Population ===
At the time of the 2006 National Census, the village's population was 614 in 176 households. The following census in 2011 counted 551 people in 188 households. The 2016 census measured the population of the village as 443 people in 159 households.
