= Hadi Kiashar =

Village in Gilan province, Iran

Hadi Kiashar Persian: هادي كياشر
- Village
- Location within Iran
- Coordinates: 37°04′44″N 50°21′55″E
- Country: Iran
- Province: Gilan
- County: Rudsar
- District: Kelachay
- Rural District: Machian

Population (2016)
  - Total: 779
- Time zone: UTC+3:30 (IRST)

Hadi Kiashar (Persian: هادي كياشر) (Note: Also romanized as Hādī Kīāshar; also known as Hadi Kiasar, Hādī Kīyā Shahr, and Haji Shir Kia) is a village in Machian Rural District of Kelachay District in Rudsar County, Gilan province, Iran.

== Demographics ==
=== Population ===
At the time of the 2006 National Census, the village's population was 749 in 221 households. The following census in 2011 counted 737 people in 241 households. The 2016 census measured the population of the village as 779 people in 268 households. It was the most populous village in its rural district.
