= Fashkol Poshteh =

Village in Gilan province, Iran

Fashkol Poshteh Persian: فشكل پشته
- Village
- Location within Iran
- Coordinates: 37°01′13″N 50°24′00″E
- Country: Iran
- Province: Gilan
- County: Rudsar
- District: Kelachay
- Rural District: Bibalan

Population (2016)
  - Total: 413
- Time zone: UTC+3:30 (IRST)

Fashkol Poshteh (Persian: فشكل پشته) is a village in Bibalan Rural District of Kelachay District in Rudsar County, Gilan province, Iran.

== Demographics ==
=== Population ===
At the time of the 2006 National Census, the village's population was 486 in 124 households. The following census in 2011 counted 438 people in 132 households. The 2016 census measured the population of the village as 413 people in 135 households.
