= Kandsar-e Bibalan =

Village in Gilan province, Iran

Kandsar-e Bibalan Persian: كندسربي بالان
- Village
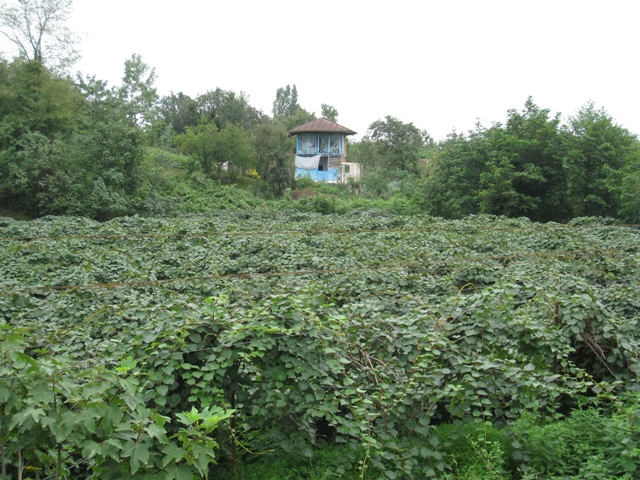

- Location within Iran
- Coordinates: 37°02′42″N 50°22′33″E
- Country: Iran
- Province: Gilan
- County: Rudsar
- District: Kelachay
- Rural District: Bibalan

Population (2016)
  - Total: 987
- Time zone: UTC+3:30 (IRST)

Kandsar-e Bibalan (Persian: كندسربي بالان) (Note: Also romanized as Kandsar-e Bībālān) is a village in Bibalan Rural District of Kelachay District in Rudsar County, Gilan province, Iran.

== Demographics ==
=== Population ===
At the time of the 2006 National Census, the village's population was 1,042 in 290 households. The following census in 2011 counted 1,102 people in 340 households. The 2016 census measured the population of the village as 987 people in 324 households.
