= Bijargah =

Bijargah (Persian: بيجارگاه) may refer to:

- Bijargah-e Olya
- Bijargah-e Sofla
