= Reza Mahalleh, Kelachay =

Village in Gilan province, Iran

Reza Mahalleh Persian: رضا محله
- Village
- Location within Iran
- Coordinates: 37°03′06″N 50°25′56″E
- Country: Iran
- Province: Gilan
- County: Rudsar
- District: Kelachay
- Rural District: Bibalan

Population (2016)
  - Total: 1,025
- Time zone: UTC+3:30 (IRST)

Reza Mahalleh (Persian: رضا محله) (Note: Also romanized as Reẕā Maḩalleh) is a village in Bibalan Rural District of Kelachay District in Rudsar County, Gilan province, Iran.

== Demographics ==
=== Population ===
At the time of the 2006 National Census, the village's population was 941 in 272 households. The following census in 2011 counted 961 people in 308 households. The 2016 census measured the population of the village as 1,025 people in 350 households. It was the most populous village in its rural district.
