= Kia Sara, Rudsar =

Village in Gilan province, Iran

Kia Sara Persian: كياسرا
- Village
- Location within Iran
- Coordinates: 37°02′26″N 50°17′46″E
- Country: Iran
- Province: Gilan
- County: Rudsar
- District: Kelachay
- Rural District: Machian

Population (2016)
  - Total: 319
- Time zone: UTC+3:30 (IRST)

Kia Sara (Persian: كياسرا) (Note: Also romanized as Kīā Sarā) is a village in Machian Rural District of Kelachay District in Rudsar County, Gilan province, Iran.

== Demographics ==
=== Population ===
At the time of the 2006 National Census, the village's population was 418 in 108 households. The following census in 2011 counted 391 people in 127 households. The 2016 census measured the population of the village as 319 people in 123 households.
