= Khaneh Sar, Gilan =

Village in Gilan province, Iran

Khaneh Sar Persian: خانه سر
- Village
- Location within Iran
- Coordinates: 37°00′13″N 50°28′02″E
- Country: Iran
- Province: Gilan
- County: Rudsar
- District: Chaboksar
- Rural District: Owshiyan

Population (2016)
  - Total: 530
- Time zone: UTC+3:30 (IRST)

Khaneh Sar (Persian: خانه سر) (Note: Also romanized as Khāneh Sar; also known as Khānsar-e Qāsemābād) is a village in Owshiyan Rural District of Chaboksar District in Rudsar County, Gilan province, Iran.

== Demographics ==
=== Population ===
At the time of the 2006 National Census, the village's population was 669 in 208 households. The following census in 2011 counted 638 people in 227 households. The 2016 census measured the population of the village as 530 people in 195 households.
