= Sarvelat =

Village in Gilan province, Iran

Sarvelat Persian: سرولات
- Village
- Location within Iran
- Coordinates: 36°57′21″N 50°32′51″E
- Country: Iran
- Province: Gilan
- County: Rudsar
- District: Chaboksar
- Rural District: Owshiyan

Population (2016)
  - Total: 509
- Time zone: UTC+3:30 (IRST)

Sarvelat (Persian: سرولات) (Note: Also romanized as Sarvelāt; also known as Sar Velāyat) is a village in Owshiyan Rural District of Chaboksar District in Rudsar County, Gilan province, Iran.

== Demographics ==
=== Population ===
At the time of the 2006 National Census, the village's population was 573 in 161 households. The following census in 2011 counted 585 people in 194 households. The 2016 census measured the population of the village as 509 people in 178 households.
