= Machian =

Village in Gilan province, Iran

Machian Persian: ماچيان
- Village
- Location within Iran
- Coordinates: 37°02′09″N 50°18′42″E
- Country: Iran
- Province: Gilan
- County: Rudsar
- District: Kelachay
- Rural District: Machian

Population (2016)
  - Total: 621
- Time zone: UTC+3:30 (IRST)

Machian (Persian: ماچيان) (Note: Also romanized as Macheyān and Māchīān) is a village in, and the capital of, Machian Rural District in Kelachay District of Rudsar County, Gilan province, Iran.

== Demographics ==
=== Language and religion ===
The dominant religion is Shiite Muslim. The majority of the inhabitants speak the Gilaki dialect.

=== Population ===
At the time of the 2006 National Census, the village's population was 603 in 190 households. The following census in 2011 counted 717 people in 249 households. The 2016 census measured the population of the village as 621 people in 228 households.

== Geography ==
Machian is in eastern Gilan province south of the city of Rudsar and west of the city of Rahimabad. The district had 43 villages in 2016. Pilarud River (ماچيان) (Big River) is near Machian, and multiple branches pass through the village.

== Economy ==
Rice and citrus are the staple crops in the region.
