= Chayjan =

Village in Gilan province, Iran

Chayjan Persian: چايجان
- Village
- Location within Iran
- Coordinates: 37°01′44″N 50°27′29″E
- Country: Iran
- Province: Gilan
- County: Rudsar
- District: Chaboksar
- Rural District: Siahkalrud

Population (2016)
  - Total: 898
- Time zone: UTC+3:30 (IRST)

Chayjan (Persian: چايجان) (Note: Also romanized as Chāyejān and Chāyjān) is a village in, and the capital of, Siahkalrud Rural District (Note: Formerly Owshiyan and Siahkalrud Rural District) in Chaboksar District of Rudsar County, Gilan province, Iran.

== Demographics ==
=== Population ===
At the time of the 2006 National Census, the village's population was 1,097 in 346 households. The following census in 2011 counted 1,056 people in 369 households. The 2016 census measured the population of the village as 898 people in 331 households. It was the most populous village in its rural district.
