= Khayyat Mahalleh =

Village in Gilan province, Iran

Khayyat Mahalleh Persian: خياطمحله
- Village
- Location within Iran
- Coordinates: 37°00′59″N 50°26′20″E
- Country: Iran
- Province: Gilan
- County: Rudsar
- District: Chaboksar
- Rural District: Siahkalrud

Population (2016)
  - Total: 675
- Time zone: UTC+3:30 (IRST)

Khayyat Mahalleh (Persian: خياطمحله) (Note: Also romanized as Khayyāţ Maḩalleh; also known as Khayyāţeh Maḩalleh) is a village in Siahkalrud Rural District (Note: Formerly Owshiyan and Siahkalrud Rural District) of Chaboksar District in Rudsar County, Gilan province, Iran.

== Demographics ==
=== Population ===
At the time of the 2006 National Census, the village's population was 730 in 214 households. The following census in 2011 counted 760 people in 256 households. The 2016 census measured the population of the village as 675 people in 239 households.
