= Bala Now Deh =

Village in Gilan province, Iran

Bala Now Deh Persian: بالانوده
- Village
- Location within Iran
- Coordinates: 37°03′20″N 50°24′17″E
- Country: Iran
- Province: Gilan
- County: Rudsar
- District: Kelachay
- Rural District: Bibalan

Population (2016)
  - Total: 840
- Time zone: UTC+3:30 (IRST)

Bala Now Deh (Persian: بالانوده) (Note: Also romanized as Bālā Now Deh; also known as Naudeh and Now Deh) is a village in Bibalan Rural District of Kelachay District in Rudsar County, Gilan province, Iran.

== Demographics ==
=== Population ===
At the time of the 2006 National Census, the village's population was 686 in 200 households. The following census in 2011 counted 576 people in 180 households. The 2016 census measured the population of the village as 840 people in 281 households.
