= Qazi Mahalleh, Gilan =

Village in Gilan province, Iran

Qazi Mahalleh Persian: قاضي محله
- Village
- Location within Iran
- Coordinates: 37°04′03″N 50°21′28″E
- Country: Iran
- Province: Gilan
- County: Rudsar
- District: Kelachay
- Rural District: Machian

Population (2016)
  - Total: 316
- Time zone: UTC+3:30 (IRST)

Qazi Mahalleh (Persian: قاضي محله) (Note: Also romanized as Qāẕī Maḩalleh) is a village in Machian Rural District of Kelachay District in Rudsar County, Gilan province, Iran.

== Demographics ==
=== Population ===
At the time of the 2006 National Census, the village's population was 331 in 104 households. The following census in 2011 counted 318 people in 110 households. The 2016 census measured the population of the village as 316 people in 115 households.
