= Baji Gavaber =

Village in Gilan province, Iran

Baji Gavaber Persian: باجي گوابر
- Village
- Location within Iran
- Coordinates: 37°00′20″N 50°26′06″E
- Country: Iran
- Province: Gilan
- County: Rudsar
- District: Chaboksar
- Rural District: Siahkalrud

Population (2016)
  - Total: 303
- Time zone: UTC+3:30 (IRST)

Baji Gavaber (Persian: باجي گوابر) (Note: Also romanized as Bājī Gavāber) is a village in Siahkalrud Rural District (Note: Formerly Owshiyan and Siahkalrud Rural District) of Chaboksar District in Rudsar County, Gilan province, Iran.

== Demographics ==
=== Population ===
At the time of the 2006 National Census, the village's population was 343 in 102 households. The following census in 2011 counted 321 people in 103 households. The 2016 census measured the population of the village as 303 people in 107 households.
