= Khasadan =

Khasadan or Khasaden (Persian: خسادان) may refer to:

- Khasadan-e Olya
- Khasadan-e Sofla
