= Baghdasht =

Baghdasht or Bagh Dasht or Bagh-e Dasht (Persian: باغ دشت) may refer to:

- Bagh Dasht, Fars
- Baghdasht, Gilan
- Bagh Dasht, Mazandaran
- Baghdasht, Qazvin
