= Narenj Kola-ye Olya =

Narenj Kola-ye Olya نارنج كلايه عليا
- Village
- Location within Iran
- Coordinates: 37°02′20″N 50°17′54″E
- Country: Iran
- Province: Gilan
- County: Rudsar
- Bakhsh: Kelachay
- Rural District: Machian

Population (2006)
  - Total: 93
- Time zone: UTC+3:30 (IRST)
  - Summer (DST): UTC+4:30 (IRDT)

Narenj Kola-ye Olya (Persian: نارنج كلايه عليا, also Romanized as Nārenj Kolā-ye ‘Olyā; also known as Nārenj Kolā) is a village in Machian Rural District, Kelachay District, Rudsar County, Gilan Province, Iran. At the 2006 census, its population was 93, in 26 families.
