= Sajidan =

Village in Gilan province, Iran

Sajidan Persian: سجيدان
- Village
- Location within Iran
- Coordinates: 36°59′21″N 50°26′09″E
- Country: Iran
- Province: Gilan
- County: Rudsar
- District: Chaboksar
- Rural District: Siahkalrud

Population (2016)
  - Total: 433
- Time zone: UTC+3:30 (IRST)

Sajidan (Persian: سجيدان) (Note: Also romanized as Sajīdān) is a village in Siahkalrud Rural District (Note: Formerly Owshiyan and Siahkalrud Rural District) of Chaboksar District in Rudsar County, Gilan province, Iran.

== Demographics ==
=== Population ===
At the time of the 2006 National Census, the village's population was 442 in 124 households. The following census in 2011 counted 427 people in 132 households. The 2016 census measured the population of the village as 433 people in 160 households.
