= Lamin Jub =

Lamin Jub (Persian: لمين جوب), also rendered as Liman Jub, may refer to:

- Bala Lamin Jub
- Pain Lamin Jub
