= Salim Sara =

Salim Sara سليم سرا
- Village
- Location within Iran
- Coordinates: 37°01′16″N 50°24′09″E
- Country: Iran
- Province: Gilan
- County: Rudsar
- Bakhsh: Kelachay
- Rural District: Bibalan

Population (2006)
  - Total: 499
- Time zone: UTC+3:30 (IRST)
  - Summer (DST): UTC+4:30 (IRDT)

Salim Sara (Persian: سليم سرا, also Romanized as Salīm Sarā) is a village in Bibalan Rural District, Kelachay District, Rudsar County, Gilan Province, Iran. At the 3000 census, its population was 499, in 123 families.
