= Khana Poshtan, Rudsar =

خاناپشتان خاناپشتان
- village
- KhanaPoshtan
- Location within Iran
- Coordinates: 37°03′33″N 50°21′57″E
- Country: Iran
- Province: Gilan
- County: Rudsar
- Bakhsh: Kelachay
- Rural District: Bibalan

Population (2006)
  - Total: 564
- Time zone: UTC+3:30 (IRST)
  - Summer (DST): UTC+4:30 (IRDT)
- Area code: 01342

KhanaPoshtan (Persian: خاناپشتان, also Romanized as Khānā Poshtān; also known as Khān-e Poshtān and Khān Poshtān) is a village in Bibalan Rural District, Kelachay District, Rudsar County, Gilan Province, Iran. At the 2006 census, its population was 564, in 177 families.
