= Narenj Kola-ye Sofla =

Narenj Kola-ye Sofla نارنج كلايه سفلي
- Village
- Location within Iran
- Coordinates: 37°02′01″N 50°18′09″E
- Country: Iran
- Province: Gilan
- County: Rudsar
- Bakhsh: Kelachay
- Rural District: Machian

Population (2006)
  - Total: 54
- Time zone: UTC+3:30 (IRST)
  - Summer (DST): UTC+4:30 (IRDT)

Narenj Kola-ye Sofla (Persian: نارنج كلايه سفلي, also Romanized as Nārenj Kolā-ye Soflá) is a village in Machian Rural District, Kelachay District, Rudsar County, Gilan Province, Iran. At the 2006 census, its population was 54, in 18 families.
