= Bala Lamin Jub =

Bala Lamin Jub بالالمين جوب
- Village
- Country: Iran
- Province: Gilan
- County: Rudsar
- Bakhsh: Kelachay
- Rural District: Bibalan

Population (2006)
  - Total: 164
- Time zone: UTC+3:30 (IRST)
  - Summer (DST): UTC+4:30 (IRDT)

Bala Lamin Jub (Persian: بالالمين جوب, also Romanized as Bālā Lamīn Jūb) is a village in Bibalan Rural District, Kelachay District, Rudsar County, Gilan Province, Iran. At the 2006 census, its population was 164, in 45 families.
