= Pain Lamin Jub =

Pain Lamin Jub پائين لمين جوب
- Village
- Location within Iran
- Coordinates: 37°04′36″N 50°22′30″E
- Country: Iran
- Province: Gilan
- County: Rudsar
- Bakhsh: Kelachay
- Rural District: Bibalan

Population (2006)
  - Total: 211
- Time zone: UTC+3:30 (IRST)
  - Summer (DST): UTC+4:30 (IRDT)

Pain Lamin Jub (Persian: پائين لمين جوب, also Romanized as Pā’īn Lamīn Jūb; also known as Pā’īn Līman Jūb, Līman Jūb, and Līman Jūb-e Pā’īn) is a village in Bibalan Rural District, Kelachay District, Rudsar County, Gilan Province, Iran. At the 2006 census, its population was 211, in 58 families.
