= Bibalan =

Village in Gilan province, Iran

Bibalan Persian: بي بالان
- Village
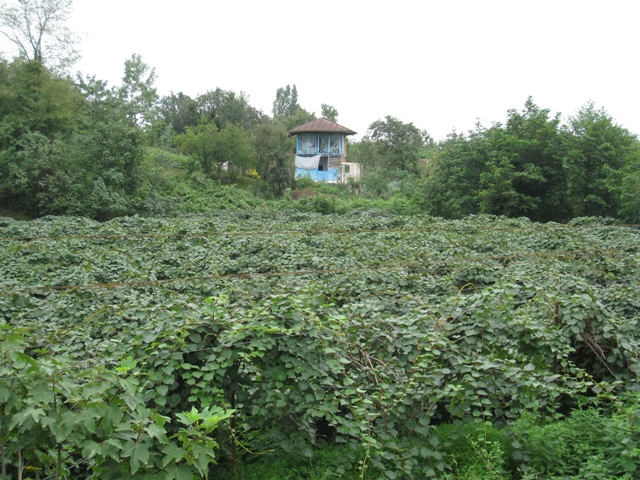
- Kiwi garden in the village of Bibalan

- Location within Iran
- Coordinates: 37°03′03″N 50°23′24″E
- Country: Iran
- Province: Gilan
- County: Rudsar
- District: Kelachay
- Rural District: Bibalan

Population (2016)
  - Total: 959
- Time zone: UTC+3:30 (IRST)

Bibalan (Persian: بي بالان) (Note: Also romanized as Bībālān; also known as Bībālān-e Pā’īn) is a village in, and the capital of, Bibalan Rural District in Kelachay District of Rudsar County, Gilan province, Iran.

== Demographics ==
=== Population ===
At the time of the 2006 National Census, the village's population was 1,172 in 375 households. The following census in 2011 counted 1,051 people in 374 households. The 2016 census measured the population of the village as 959 people in 357 households.
