= Pain Mahalleh-ye Qasemabad =

Village in Gilan province, Iran

Pain Mahalleh-ye Qasemabad Persian: پايين محله قاسم آباد
- Village
- Country: Iran
- Province: Gilan
- County: Rudsar
- District: Chaboksar
- Rural District: Owshiyan

Population (2016)
  - Total: 418
- Time zone: UTC+3:30 (IRST)

Pain Mahalleh-ye Qasemabad (Persian: پايين محله قاسم اباد) (Note: Also romanized as Pā’īn Maḩalleh-ye Qāsemābād) is a village in Owshiyan Rural District of Chaboksar District in Rudsar County, Gilan province, Iran.

== Demographics ==
=== Population ===
At the time of the 2006 National Census, the village's population was 487 in 138 households. The following census in 2011 counted 444 people in 143 households. The 2016 census measured the population of the village as 418 people in 149 households.
