= Molk-e Mian =

Village in Gilan province, Iran

Molk-e Mian Persian: ملكميان
- Village
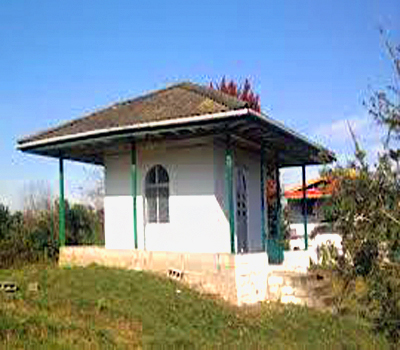
- A house in the village of Molk-e Mian

- Location within Iran
- Coordinates: 37°00′03″N 50°28′18″E
- Country: Iran
- Province: Gilan
- County: Rudsar
- District: Chaboksar
- Rural District: Owshiyan

Population (2016)
  - Total: 644
- Time zone: UTC+3:30 (IRST)

Molk-e Mian (Persian: ملک میان) (Note: Also romanized as Malek Mīān, Molk Meyan, and Molk-e Mīān) is a village in Owshiyan Rural District of Chaboksar District in Rudsar County, Gilan province, Iran.

== Demographics ==
=== Language ===
The linguistic composition of the city consists of native Gilaki at 40% and standard Persian at 60% currently.

=== Population ===
At the time of the 2006 National Census, the village's population was 677 in 192 households. The following census in 2011 counted 726 people in 229 households. The 2016 census measured the population of the village as 644 people in 221 households.

== Notable people ==
- Mohammad Safari Molkmian, Shia cleric
