= Qasemabad-e Sofla, Gilan =

Village in Gilan province, Iran

Qasemabad-e Sofla Persian: قاسم آباد سفلی
- Village
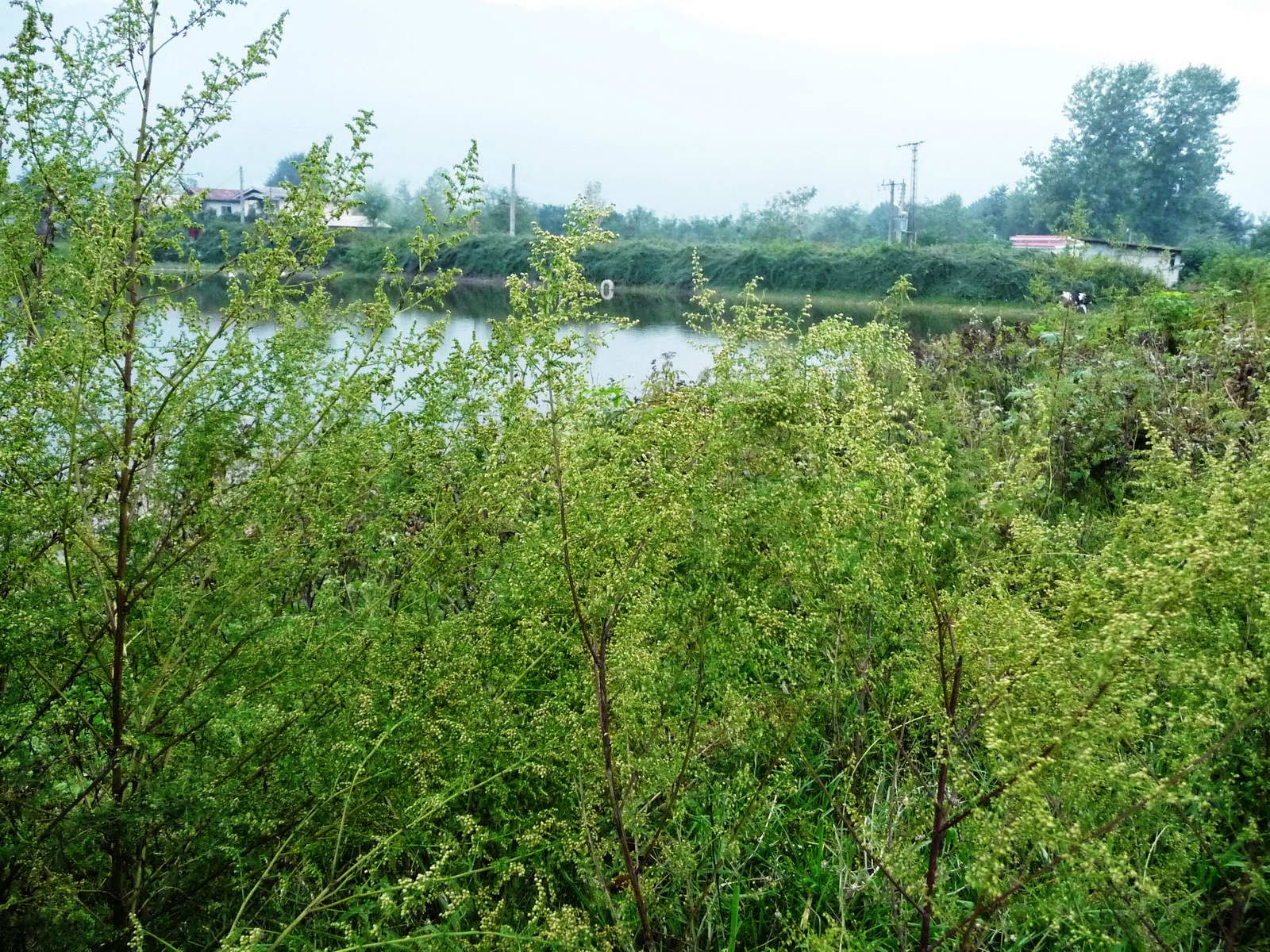

- Location within Iran
- Coordinates: 37°00′00″N 50°29′24″E
- Country: Iran
- Province: Gilan
- County: Rudsar
- District: Chaboksar
- Rural District: Owshiyan

Population (2016)
  - Total: 2,850
- Time zone: UTC+3:30 (IRST)

Qasemabad-e Sofla (Persian: قاسم آباد سفلی) (Note: Also romanized as Qāsemābād-e Soflá; also known as Qāsem Ābād and Qāsemābād-e Pā’īn) is a village in, and the capital of, Owshiyan Rural District in Chaboksar District of Rudsar County, Gilan province, Iran.

== Demographics ==
=== Population ===
At the time of the 2006 National Census, the village's population was 2,667 in 763 households. The following census in 2011 counted 2,847 people in 881 households. The 2016 census measured the population of the village as 2,850 people in 972 households. It was the most populous village in its rural district.
