= Narenj Kola =

Narenj Kola (Persian: نارنج كلايه) may refer to:

- Narenj Kola-ye Olya
- Narenj Kola-ye Sofla
