= Khana Poshtan =

Khana Poshtan (Persian: خاناپشتان) may refer to:

- Khana Poshtan, Langarud
- Khana Poshtan, Rudsar
