= Mazukaleh Poshteh =

Village in Gilan province, Iran

Mazukaleh Poshteh Persian: مازوكله پشته
- Village
- Location within Iran
- Coordinates: 37°00′45″N 50°24′32″E
- Country: Iran
- Province: Gilan
- County: Rudsar
- District: Kelachay
- Rural District: Bibalan

Population (2016)
  - Total: 451
- Time zone: UTC+3:30 (IRST)

Mazukaleh Poshteh (Persian: مازوكله پشته) (Note: Also romanized as Māzūkaleh Poshteh; also known as Māzokaleh, Māzokaleh Poshteh-ye Bālā, and Māzūkaleh Poshteh-ye Bālā) is a village in Bibalan Rural District of Kelachay District in Rudsar County, Gilan province, Iran.

== Demographics ==
=== Population ===
At the time of the 2006 National Census, the village's population was 583 in 150 households. The following census in 2011 counted 583 people in 179 households. The 2016 census measured the population of the village as 451 people in 154 households.
