= Khasadan-e Sofla =

Khasadan-e Sofla خسادان سفلي
- Village
- Location within Iran
- Coordinates: 37°00′44″N 50°17′55″E
- Country: Iran
- Province: Gilan
- County: Rudsar
- Bakhsh: Kelachay
- Rural District: Machian

Population (2006)
  - Total: 163
- Time zone: UTC+3:30 (IRST)
  - Summer (DST): UTC+4:30 (IRDT)

Khasadan-e Sofla (Persian: خسادان سفلي, also Romanized as Khasādān-e Soflá; also known as Khasādān-e Pā’īn and Khasāden-e Pā’īn) is a village in Machian Rural District, Kelachay District, Rudsar County, Gilan Province, Iran. At the 2006 census, its population was 163, in 36 families.
