= Shir Mahalleh, Gilan =

Village in Gilan province, Iran

Shir Mahalleh Persian: شيرمحله
- Village
- Location within Iran
- Coordinates: 37°05′31″N 50°22′08″E
- Country: Iran
- Province: Gilan
- County: Rudsar
- District: Kelachay
- Rural District: Machian

Population (2016)
  - Total: 574
- Time zone: UTC+3:30 (IRST)

Shir Mahalleh (Persian: شيرمحله) (Note: Also romanized as Shīr Maḩalleh; also known as Shīrīn Maḩalleh) is a village in Machian Rural District of Kelachay District in Rudsar County, Gilan province, Iran. It is located northwest of Kelachay city.

== Demographics ==
=== Population ===
At the time of the 2006 National Census, the village's population was 483 in 141 households. The following census in 2011 counted 572 people in 196 households. The 2016 census measured the population of the village as 574 people in 208 households.
