= Halu Kaleh, Gilan =

Village in Gilan province, Iran

Halu Kaleh Persian: هلوكله
- Village
- Location within Iran
- Coordinates: 36°58′59″N 50°31′39″E
- Country: Iran
- Province: Gilan
- County: Rudsar
- District: Chaboksar
- Rural District: Owshiyan

Population (2016)
  - Total: 471
- Time zone: UTC+3:30 (IRST)

Halu Kaleh (Persian: هلوكله) (Note: Also romanized as Halū Kaleh) is a village in Owshiyan Rural District of Chaboksar District in Rudsar County, Gilan province, Iran.

== Demographics ==
=== Population ===
At the time of the 2006 National Census, the village's population was 189 in 51 households. The following census in 2011 counted 445 people in 130 households. The 2016 census measured the population of the village as 471 people in 150 households.
