= Sar Sar, Machian =

Village in Gilan province, Iran

Sar Sar Persian: سارسر
- Village
- Location within Iran
- Coordinates: 37°02′30″N 50°19′08″E
- Country: Iran
- Province: Gilan
- County: Rudsar
- District: Kelachay
- Rural District: Machian

Population (2016)
  - Total: 209
- Time zone: UTC+3:30 (IRST)

Sar Sar (Persian: سارسر) (Note: Also romanized as Sār Sar and Sarsār) is a village in Machian Rural District of Kelachay District in Rudsar County, Gilan province, Iran.

== Demographics ==
=== Population ===
At the time of the 2006 National Census, the village's population was 256 in 75 households. The following census in 2011 counted 261 people in 89 households. The 2016 census measured the population of the village as 209 people in 83 households.
