= Chaboksar =

City in Gilan province, Iran

Chaboksar Persian: چابکسر
- City
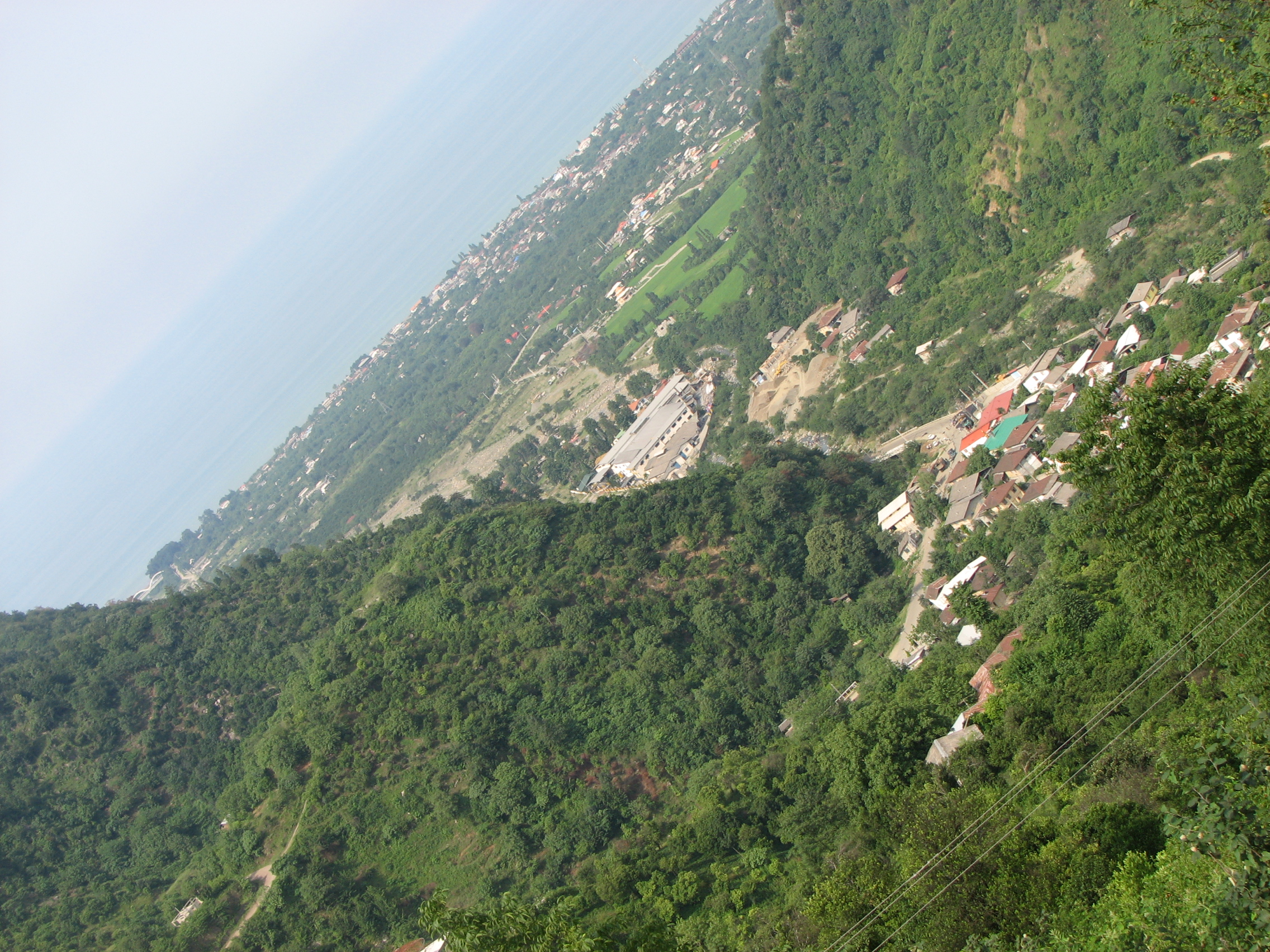

- Location within Iran
- Coordinates: 36°58′31″N 50°34′18″E
- Country: Iran
- Province: Gilan
- County: Rudsar
- District: Chaboksar

Population (2016)
  - Total: 8,224
- Time zone: UTC+3:30 (IRST)

Chaboksar (Persian: چابکسر) (Note: Also romanized as Chāboksar; also known as Chābuksār) is a city in, and the capital of, Chaboksar District in Rudsar County, Gilan province, Iran.

== Geography ==
Chaboksar is at the Caspian Sea coast, by the Mianrud river. It is 33 km (21 mi) southeast of the county seat, Rudsar.

== Demographics ==
People of Chaboksar are Gilaks, speaking the Gilaki language and their religion is Shia Islam.

=== Population ===
During Iran's first census, Chaboksar was village in Owshiyan Rural District, in Rudsar District of Lahijan County. Its population was 590 people and its agricultural products has included rice, tea and citrus fruits.

At the 1966 census, Chaboksar's population was 1,912 in 365 households. It was administratively in Chaboksar Rural District of Rudsar County. Its main facilities at the time were elementary and high schools, mosque, post office, and power connection. By the time of the 1976 census, Chaboksar became a city.

At the time of the 2006 National Census, the city's population was 7,891 in 2,270 households. The following census in 2011 counted 6,994 people in 2,229 households. The 2016 census measured the population of the city as 8,224 people in 2,750 households.

== Climate ==
Chaboksar has a Humid temperate climate.
