= Nemat =

Nemat may refer to:

== People with the name ==
- Marina Nemat (born 1965), Russian-Iranian-Canadian author
- Orzala Ashraf Nemat, Afghan scholar and civil society activist
- Rameez Nemat (born 1986), Indian first-class cricketer
- Hajj Nematollah (1871–1920), mystic and religious leader of the Qajar Empire
- Nemat Shafik (born 1962), British-American economist
- Komeil Nemat Ghasemi (born 1988), Iranian wrestler
- Nemat (militant), Afghan militant and Salafist cleric

== See also ==
- Boneh-ye Hajj Nemat, a village in Bushehr Province, Iran
- Nemat Sara, a village in Gilan Province, Iran
- Tall-e Nemat, a village in Lorestan Province, Iran
