= Bijargah-e Sofla =

Village in Gilan province, Iran

Bijargah-e Sofla Persian: بيجارگاه سفلي
- Village
- Location within Iran
- Coordinates: 37°01′32″N 50°18′03″E
- Country: Iran
- Province: Gilan
- County: Rudsar
- District: Kelachay
- Rural District: Machian

Population (2016)
  - Total: 254
- Time zone: UTC+3:30 (IRST)

Bijargah-e Sofla (Persian: بيجارگاه سفلي) (Note: Also romanized as Bījārgāh-e Soflá; also known as Bījārgāh-e Pā’īn) is a village in Machian Rural District of Kelachay District in Rudsar County, Gilan province, Iran.

== Demographics ==
=== Population ===
At the time of the 2006 National Census, the village's population was 340 in 87 households. The following census in 2011 counted 304 people in 91 households. The 2016 census measured the population of the village as 254 people in 100 households.
