= Selakjan, Kelachay =

Village in Gilan province, Iran

Selakjan Persian: سلاكجان
- Village
- Location within Iran
- Coordinates: 37°01′16″N 50°22′38″E
- Country: Iran
- Province: Gilan
- County: Rudsar
- District: Kelachay
- Rural District: Bibalan

Population (2016)
  - Total: 324
- Time zone: UTC+3:30 (IRST)

Selakjan (Persian: سلاكجان) (Note: Also romanized as Selākjān) is a village in Bibalan Rural District of Kelachay District in Rudsar County, Gilan province, Iran.

== Demographics ==
=== Population ===
At the time of the 2006 National Census, the village's population was 604 in 179 households. The following census in 2011 counted 226 people in 75 households. The 2016 census measured the population of the village as 324 people in 116 households.

In 2023, the villages of Bijar Poshteh and Lateh were merged with Selakjan.
