= Khasadan-e Olya =

Village in Gilan province, Iran

Khasadan-e Olya Persian: خسادان عليا
- Village
- Location within Iran
- Coordinates: 37°00′14″N 50°17′20″E
- Country: Iran
- Province: Gilan
- County: Rudsar
- District: Kelachay
- Rural District: Machian

Population (2016)
  - Total: 263
- Time zone: UTC+3:30 (IRST)

Khasadan-e Olya (Persian: خسادان عليا) (Note: Also romanized as Khasādān-e ‘Olyā; also known as Khasādān-e Bālā and Khasāden) is a village in Machian Rural District of Kelachay District in Rudsar County, Gilan province, Iran.

== Demographics ==
=== Population ===
At the time of the 2006 National Census, the village's population was 312 in 75 households. The following census in 2011 counted 321 people in 93 households. The 2016 census measured the population of the village as 263 people in 90 households.
