= Shir Mahalleh =

Shir Mahalleh (Persian: شيرمحله) may refer to:

- Shir Mahalleh, Gilan
- Shir Mahalleh, Mazandaran
