= Nemat Sara =

Village in Gilan province, Iran

Nemat Sara Persian: نعمتسرا
- Village
- Location within Iran
- Coordinates: 37°01′54″N 50°21′41″E
- Country: Iran
- Province: Gilan
- County: Rudsar
- District: Kelachay
- Rural District: Bibalan

Population (2016)
  - Total: 417
- Time zone: UTC+3:30 (IRST)

Nemat Sara (Persian: نعمتسرا) (Note: Also romanized as Ne‘mat Sarā) is a village in Bibalan Rural District of Kelachay District in Rudsar County, Gilan province, Iran.

== Demographics ==
=== Population ===
At the time of the 2006 National Census, the village's population was 497 in 132 households. The following census in 2011 counted 532 people in 155 households. The 2016 census measured the population of the village as 417 people in 134 households.
