= Bijargah-e Olya =

Village in Gilan province, Iran

Bijargah-e Olya Persian: بيجارگاه عليا
- Village
- Location within Iran
- Coordinates: 37°01′47″N 50°17′53″E
- Country: Iran
- Province: Gilan
- County: Rudsar
- District: Kelachay
- Rural District: Machian

Population (2016)
  - Total: 327
- Time zone: UTC+3:30 (IRST)

Bijargah-e Olya (Persian: بيجارگاه عليا) (Note: Also romanized as Bījārgāh-e ‘Olyā; also known as Bījārgāh-e Bālā) is a village in Machian Rural District of Kelachay District in Rudsar County, Gilan province, Iran.

== Demographics ==
=== Population ===
At the time of the 2006 National Census, the village's population was 390 in 99 households. The following census in 2011 counted 375 people in 119 households. The 2016 census measured the population of the village as 327 people in 121 households.
