= Selakjan, Reza Mahalleh =

Selakjan سلاكجان
- Village
- Location within Iran
- Coordinates: 37°05′49″N 50°19′02″E
- Country: Iran
- Province: Gilan
- County: Rudsar
- Bakhsh: Central
- Rural District: Reza Mahalleh

Population (2006)
  - Total: 101
- Time zone: UTC+3:30 (IRST)
  - Summer (DST): UTC+4:30 (IRDT)

Selakjan (Persian: سلاكجان, also Romanized as Selākjān) is a village in Reza Mahalleh Rural District, in the Central District of Rudsar County, Gilan Province, Iran. At the 2006 census, its population was 101, in 29 families.
