= Khana Poshtan, Langarud =

Khana Poshtan خاناپشتان
- Village
- Country: Iran
- Province: Gilan
- County: Langarud
- Bakhsh: Otaqvar
- Rural District: Otaqvar

Population (2006)
  - Total: 70
- Time zone: UTC+3:30 (IRST)
  - Summer (DST): UTC+4:30 (IRDT)

Khana Poshtan (Persian: خاناپشتان, also Romanized as Khānā Poshtān) is a village in Otaqvar Rural District, Otaqvar District, Langarud County, Gilan Province, Iran. At the 2006 census, its population was 70, in 20 families.
