= Bagh Dasht, Fars =

Bagh Dasht باغ دشت
- Village
- Location within Iran
- Coordinates: 29°13′16″N 51°58′26″E
- Country: Iran
- Province: Fars
- County: Kazerun
- Bakhsh: Jereh and Baladeh
- Rural District: Jereh

Population (2006)
  - Total: 979
- Time zone: UTC+3:30 (IRST)
  - Summer (DST): UTC+4:30 (IRDT)

Bagh Dasht (Persian: باغ دشت, also Romanized as Bāgh Dasht, Bagh-e Dasht, and Bāgh-i-Dash; also known as Bāgh Dāsh) is a village in Jereh Rural District, Jereh and Baladeh District, Kazerun County, Fars province, Iran. At the 2006 census, its population was 979, in 195 families.
