= Kelachay =

City in Gilan province, Iran

Kelachay Persian: کلاچای
- City
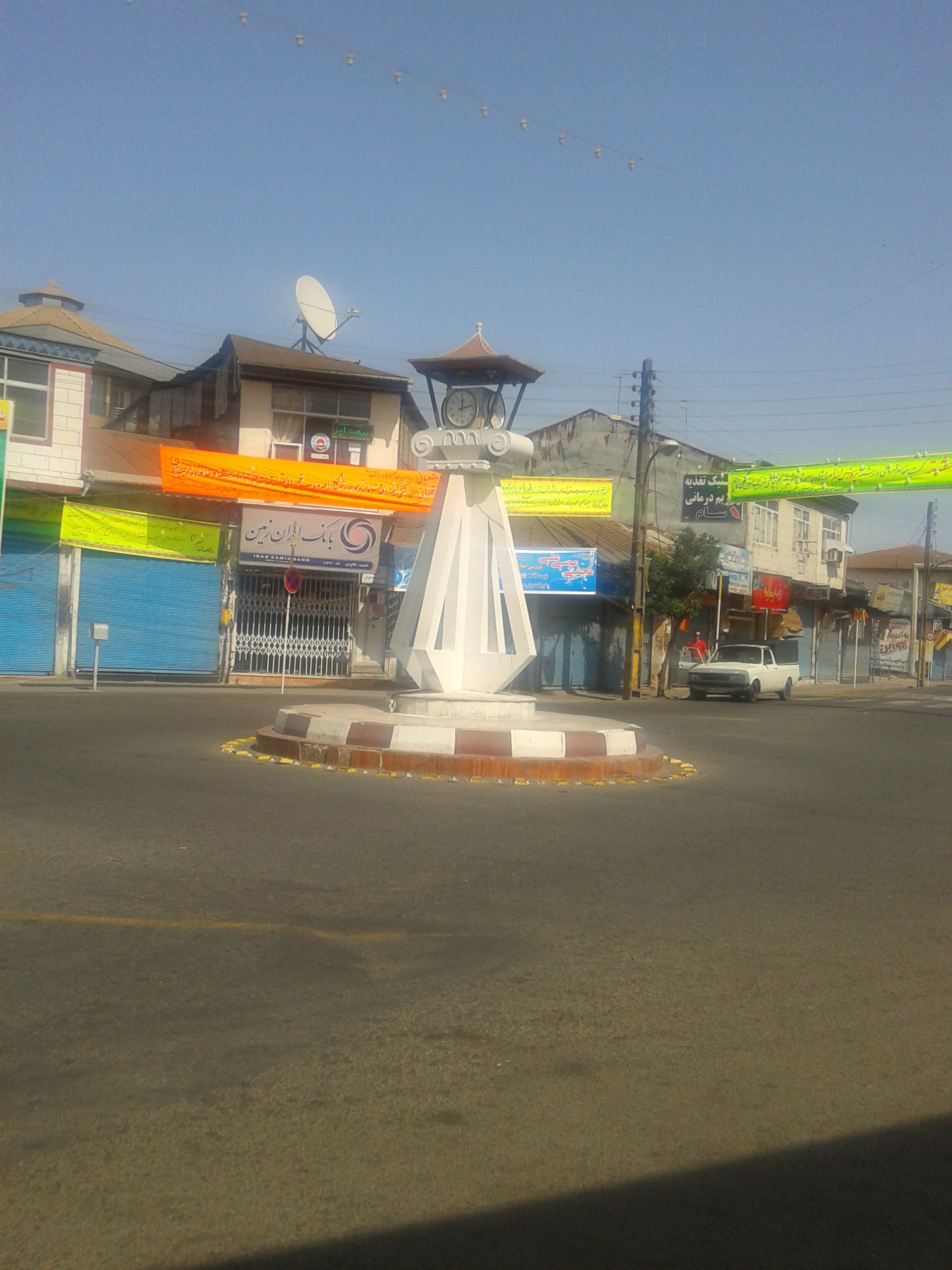

- Location within Iran
- Coordinates: 37°04′36″N 50°23′50″E
- Country: Iran
- Province: Gilan
- County: Rudsar
- District: Kelachay

Population (2016)
  - Total: 12,379
- Time zone: UTC+3:30 (IRST)

Kelachay (Persian: کلاچای) (Note: Also romanized as Kelā Chāy and Kelāchāy; also known as Kala Cha; Gilaki: کلأچئه) is a city in, and the capital of, Kelachay District of Rudsar County, Gilan province, Iran. It is on the Caspian Sea.

== Demographics ==
=== Population ===
At the time of the 2006 National Census, the city's population was 11,304 in 3,338 households. The following census in 2011 counted 11,936 people in 3,831 households. The 2016 census measured the population of the city as 12,379 people in 4,329 households.
