= Geleh Mahalleh =

Geleh Mahalleh گله محله
- Village
- Location within Iran
- Coordinates: 36°28′20″N 52°32′50″E
- Country: Iran
- Province: Mazandaran
- County: Babol
- Bakhsh: Lalehabad
- Rural District: Lalehabad

Population (2006)
  - Total: 310
- Time zone: UTC+3:30 (IRST)
  - Summer (DST): UTC+4:30 (IRDT)

Geleh Mahalleh (Persian: گله محله, also Romanized as Geleh Maḩalleh; also known as Gol Maḩalleh) is a village in Lalehabad Rural District, Lalehabad District, Babol County, Mazandaran Province, Iran. At the 2006 census, its population was 310, in 76 families.
