= Siahkalrud Rural District =

Rural district in Gilan province, Iran

Siahkalrud Rural District Persian: دهستان سياهكلرود
- Rural District
- Location within Iran
- Coordinates: 36°57′N 50°26′E
- Country: Iran
- Province: Gilan
- County: Rudsar
- District: Chaboksar
- Established: 1987
- Capital: Chayjan

Population (2016)
  - Total: 5,241
- Time zone: UTC+3:30 (IRST)

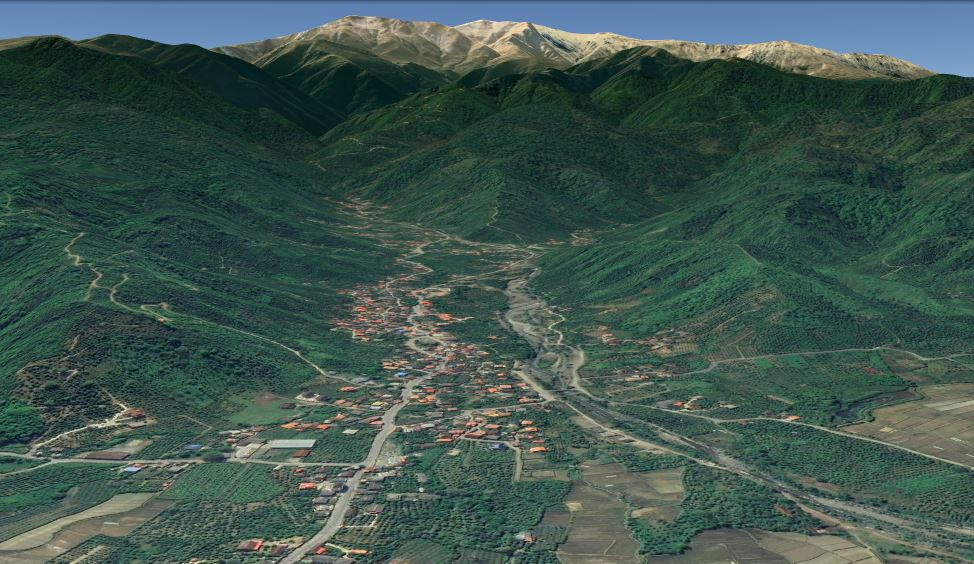
View of Siahkalrud Rural District

Siahkalrud Rural District (Persian: دهستان سياهكلرود) (Note: Formerly Owshiyan and Siahkalrud Rural District (دهستان اوشيان و سياهكلرود)) is in Chaboksar District of Rudsar County, Gilan province, Iran. Its capital is the village of Chayjan.

== Demographics ==
=== Population ===
At the time of the 2006 National Census, the rural district's population was 5,986 in 1,845 households. There were 5,731 inhabitants in 1,937 households at the following census of 2011. The 2016 census measured the population of the rural district as 5,241 in 1,942 households. The most populous of its 18 villages was Chayjan, with 898 people.

=== Other villages in the rural district ===
- Baji Gavaber
- Chaykhansar
- Khayyat Mahalleh
- Sajidan
- Shad Morad Mahalleh
- Siahkalrud
