= Owshiyan Rural District =

Rural district in Gilan province, Iran

Owshiyan Rural District Persian: دهستان اوشيان
- Rural District
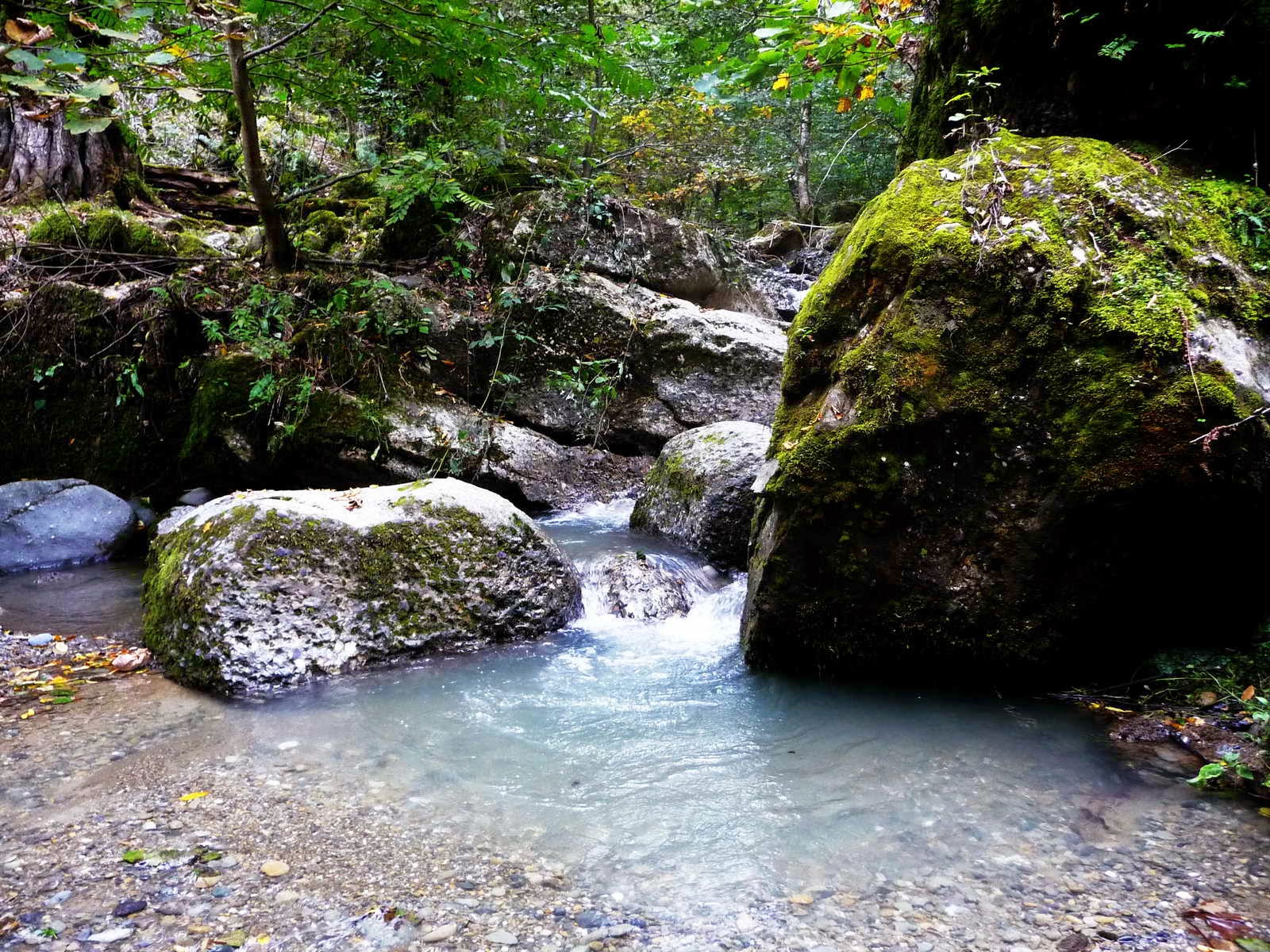

- Location within Iran
- Coordinates: 36°57′N 50°31′E
- Country: Iran
- Province: Gilan
- County: Rudsar
- District: Chaboksar
- Established: 1997
- Capital: Qasemabad-e Sofla

Population (2016)
  - Total: 11,539
- Time zone: UTC+3:30 (IRST)
- Website: www.oshiyan.ir

Owshiyan Rural District (Persian: دهستان اوشيان) is in Chaboksar District of Rudsar County, Gilan province, Iran. Its capital is the village of Qasemabad-e Sofla.

== Demographics ==
=== Population ===
At the time of the 2006 National Census, the rural district's population was 11,269 in 3,216 households. There were 12,576 inhabitants in 3,974 households at the following census of 2011. The 2016 census measured the population of the rural district as 11,539 in 3,970 households. The most populous of its 43 villages was Qasemabad-e Sofla, with 2,850 people.

=== Other villages in the rural district ===
- Bala Mahalleh-ye Qasemabad
- Bandbon-e Qasemabad
- Duran
- Halu Kaleh
- Khaneh Sar
- Molk-e Mian
- Owshiyan
- Pain Mahalleh-ye Qasemabad
- Sarvelat
- Tuska Mahalleh-ye Qasemabad
