= Machian Rural District =

Rural district in Gilan province, Iran

Machian Rural District Persian: دهستان ماچيان
- Rural District
- Location within Iran
- Coordinates: 37°03′N 50°20′E
- Country: Iran
- Province: Gilan
- County: Rudsar
- District: Kelachay
- Established: 1994
- Capital: Machian

Population (2016)
  - Total: 7,063
- Time zone: UTC+3:30 (IRST)

Machian Rural District (Persian: دهستان ماچيان) is in Kelachay District of Rudsar County, Gilan province, Iran. Its capital is the village of Machian.

== Demographics ==
=== Population ===
At the time of the 2006 National Census, the rural district's population was 7,917 in 2,210 households. There were 7,776 inhabitants in 2,509 households at the following census of 2011. The 2016 census measured the population of the rural district as 7,063 in 2,603 households. The most populous of its 43 villages was Hadi Kiashar, with 779 people.

=== Other villages in the rural district ===
- Bijargah-e Olya
- Bijargah-e Sofla
- Kalan Kalayeh
- Khasadan-e Olya
- Kia Sara
- Qazi Mahalleh
- Sar Sar
- Shir Mahalleh
