= Bibalan Rural District =

Rural district in Gilan province, Iran

Bibalan Rural District Persian: دهستان بي بالان
- Rural District
- Location within Iran
- Coordinates: 37°03′N 50°23′E
- Country: Iran
- Province: Gilan
- County: Rudsar
- District: Kelachay
- Established: 1997
- Capital: Bibalan

Population (2016)
  - Total: 9,657
- Time zone: UTC+3:30 (IRST)

Bibalan Rural District (Persian: دهستان بي بالان) is in Kelachay District of Rudsar County, Gilan province, Iran. Its capital is the village of Bibalan.

== Demographics ==
=== Population ===
At the time of the 2006 National Census, the rural district's population was 12,073 in 3,437 households. There were 9,933 inhabitants in 3,210 households at the following census of 2011. The 2016 census measured the population of the rural district as 9,657 in 3,352 households. The most populous of its 28 villages was Reza Mahalleh, with 1,025 people.

=== Other villages in the rural district ===
- Bala Gazaf Rud
- Bala Now Deh
- Dehkadeh Qods
- Fashkol Poshteh
- Kandsar-e Bibalan
- Mazukaleh Poshteh
- Nemat Sara
- Selakjan
