= Chaboksar District =

District in Gilan province, Iran

Chaboksar District Persian: بخش چابکسر
- District
- Location within Iran
- Coordinates: 36°57′N 50°28′E
- Country: Iran
- Province: Gilan
- County: Rudsar
- Established: 1997
- Capital: Chaboksar

Population (2016)
  - Total: 25,004
- Time zone: UTC+3:30 (IRST)

Chaboksar District (Persian: بخش چابکسر) is in Rudsar County, Gilan province, Iran. Its capital is the city of Chaboksar.

== Demographics ==
=== Population ===
At the time of the 2006 National Census, the district's population was 25,146 in 7,331 households. The following census in 2011 counted 25,301 people in 8,140 households. The 2016 census measured the population of the district as 25,004 inhabitants in 8,662 households.

=== Administrative divisions ===
Chaboksar District Population
Administrative Divisions	2006	2011	2016
Owshiyan RD	11,269	12,576	11,539
Siahkalrud RD (Note: Formerly Owshiyan and Siahkalrud Rural District)	5,986	5,731	5,241
Chaboksar (city)	7,891	6,994	8,224
Total	25,146	25,301	25,004
RD = Rural District
