= Kelachay District =

District in Gilan province, Iran

Kelachay District Persian: بخش کلاچای
- District
- Location within Iran
- Coordinates: 37°03′N 50°21′E
- Country: Iran
- Province: Gilan
- County: Rudsar
- Established: 1997
- Capital: Kelachay

Population (2016)
  - Total: 33,636
- Time zone: UTC+3:30 (IRST)

Kelachay District (Persian: بخش کلاچای) is in Rudsar County, Gila province, Iran. Its capital is the city of Kelachay.

== Demographics ==
=== Population ===
At the time of the 2006 National Census, the district's population was 34,268 in 9,878 households. The following census in 2011 counted 34,167 people in 10,984 households. The 2016 census measured the population of the district as 33,636 inhabitants in 11,847 households.

=== Administrative divisions ===
Kelachay District Population
Administrative Divisions	2006	2011	2016
Bibalan RD	12,073	9,933	9,657
Machian RD	7,917	7,776	7,063
Kelachay (city)	11,304	11,936	12,379
Vajargah (city)	2,974	4,522	4,537
Total	34,268	34,167	33,636
RD = Rural District
