= Rudsar County =

County in Gilan province, Iran

Rudsar County Persian: شهرستان رودسر
- County
- Location of Rudsar County in Gilan province (right, purple)

- Location of Gilan province in Iran
- Coordinates: 36°54′N 50°22′E
- Country: Iran
- Province: Gilan
- Capital: Rudsar
- Districts: Central, Chaboksar, Kelachay, Rahimabad

Population (2016)
  - Total: 147,399
- Time zone: UTC+3:30 (IRST)

Rudsar County (Persian: شهرستان رودسر) is in Gilan province, Iran. Its capital is the city of Rudsar.

== Demographics ==
=== Population ===
At the time of the 2006 National Census, the county's population was 144,576 in 42,004 households. The following census in 2011 counted 144,366 people in 46,357 households. The 2016 census measured the population of the county as 147,399 in 51,586 households.

=== Administrative divisions ===
Rudsar County's population history and administrative structure over three consecutive censuses are shown in the following table.

Rudsar County Population
Administrative Divisions	2006	2011	2016
Central District	57,509	58,548	58,592
Chini Jan RD	11,653	8,855	9,246
Reza Mahalleh RD	12,535	12,114	11,348
Rudsar (city)	33,321	37,579	37,998
Chaboksar District	25,146	25,301	25,004
Owshiyan RD	11,269	12,576	11,539
Siahkalrud RD (Note: Formerly Owshiyan and Siahkalrud Rural District)	5,986	5,731	5,241
Chaboksar (city)	7,891	6,994	8,224
Kelachay District	34,268	34,167	33,636
Bibalan RD	12,073	9,933	9,657
Machian RD	7,917	7,776	7,063
Kelachay (city)	11,304	11,936	12,379
Vajargah (city)	2,974	4,522	4,537
Rahimabad District	27,653	26,350	30,166
Eshkevar-e Olya and Siyarastaq Yeylaq RD (Note: Formerly Siyarastaq Yeylaq Rural District)	2,478	1,672	2,864
Eshkevar-e Sofla RD	4,842	4,446	5,012
Rahimabad RD	10,193	9,407	8,062
Shuil RD	3,146	2,106	3,657
Rahimabad (city)	6,994	8,719	10,571
Total	150,128	144,366	147,399
RD = Rural District

== Economy ==
Over 30,000 ha (74,000 acres) of land in Rudsar County is agricultural land.

== See also ==
Media related to Rudsar County at Wikimedia Commons
