= Gilan Deh =

Gilan Deh or Gilandeh (Persian: گيلان ده) may refer to:

- Gilan Deh, Ardabil
- Gilandeh, Asalem, Talesh County, Gilan Province
- Gilandeh, Kharajgil, Asalem District, Talesh County, Gilan Province
- Gilan Deh, Kurdistan
- Gilandeh, Mazandaran
