= Karmun, Gilan =

Karmun کرمون
- Village
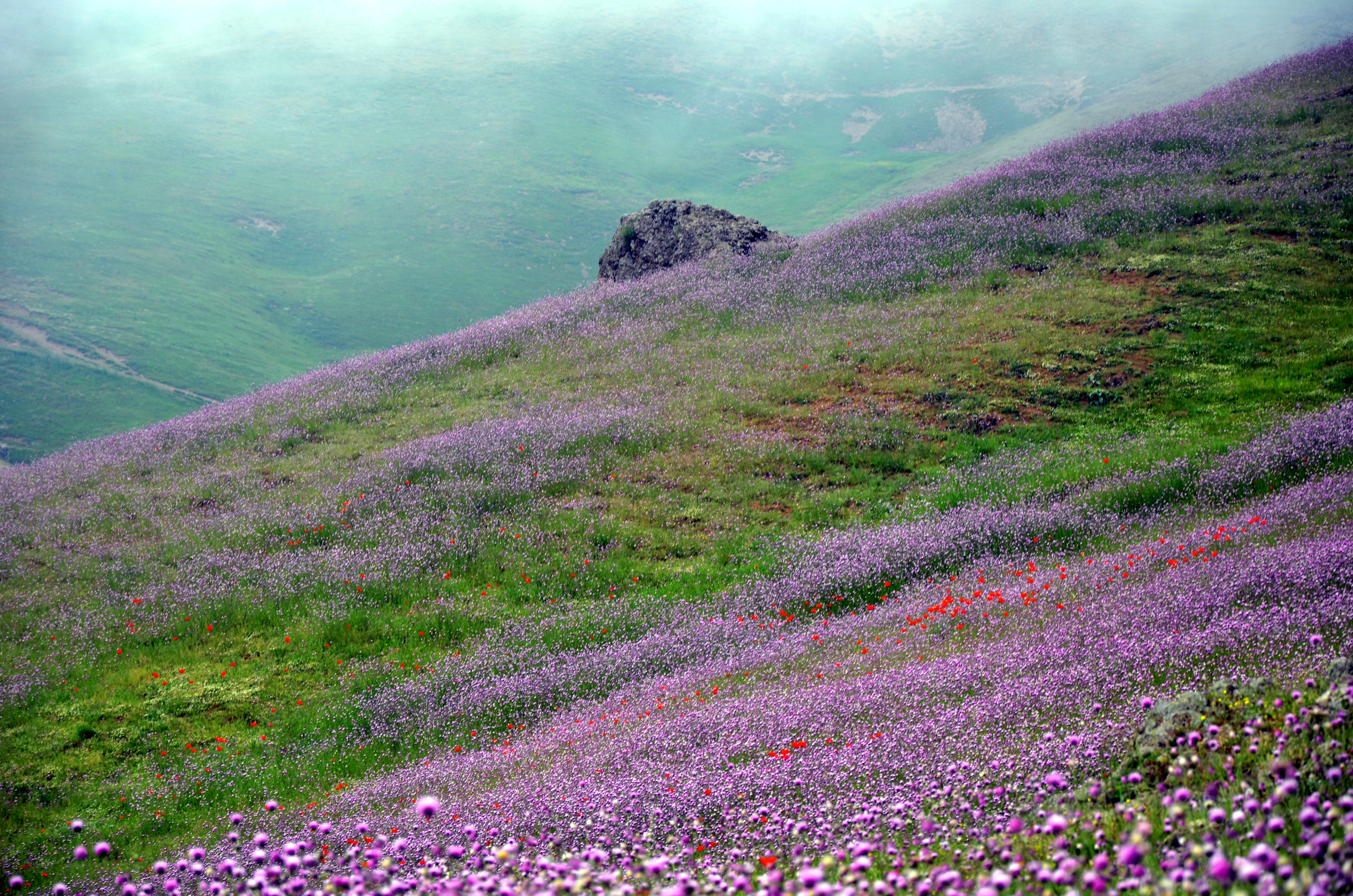

- Location within Iran
- Coordinates: 37°36′7.15″N 48°41′1.61″E
- Country: Iran
- Province: Gilan
- County: Talesh
- Bakhsh: Asalem
- Rural District: Kharajgil
- Time zone: UTC+3:30 (IRST)

Karmun (Persian: کرمون) is a village and yaylak in Kharajgil Rural District of Asalem District, Talesh County, Gilan Province, Iran, close to the border with Ardabil province.

== Geography ==
The Yeylaqi region of Karmun is on the road between Asalem and Khalkhal in Almas Pass, 25 km (16 mi) far from the latter.

== Tourism ==
The mountainous climate of the region allows the growth of wild Anemone flowers, which attracts several tourists and nature enthusiats.

== Demographics ==
At the 2006 census, Karmun's population was 17 people in 3 households.

In 2016, the village had less than 4 households and its population was not reported. Karmun is almost uninhabited in winter, with its population rising in spring and summer when herders and dwellers from other parts of Talesh County come to the village.

Karmun (Kerman) Population history
Year	Pop.	±%
1966	not reported	—
2006	17	—
2016	not reported	—
