= Siah Chal =

Siah Chal (Persian: سياه چل or سياه چال) may refer to:

- Siah Chal, Rudsar, Gilan Province (سياه چال - Sīāh Chāl)
- Siah Chal, Talesh, Gilan Province (سياه چال - Sīāh Chāl)
- Siah Chal, Lorestan (سياه چل - Sīāh Chal)
