= Nav, Iran =

Nav (Persian: نو or ناو) may refer to:

- Nav, Ardabil
- Nav, Asalem (ناو - Nāv), Talesh County, Gilan Province
- Nav, Haviq (نو -Nav), Talesh County, Gilan Province
- Nav-e Bala, Talesh County, Gilan Province
- Nav-e Pain, Talesh County, Gilan Province
- Nav, Kurdistan (ناو - Nāv)
