= Karim Sara =

Karim Sara كريم سرا
- Village
- Location within Iran
- Coordinates: 37°43′03″N 48°57′47″E
- Country: Iran
- Province: Gilan
- County: Talesh
- Bakhsh: Asalem
- Rural District: Asalem

Population (2006)
  - Total: 495
- Time zone: UTC+3:30 (IRST)
  - Summer (DST): UTC+4:30 (IRDT)

Karim Sara (Persian: كريم سرا, also Romanized as Karīm Sarā) is a village in Asalem Rural District, Asalem District, Talesh County, Gilan Province, Iran. At the 2006 census, its population was 495, in 110 families.
