= Do Khaleh Kuh =

Do Khaleh Kuh دخاله كوه
- Village
- Location within Iran
- Coordinates: 37°36′09″N 48°46′10″E
- Country: Iran
- Province: Gilan
- County: Talesh
- Bakhsh: Asalem
- Rural District: Kharajgil

Population (2016)
  - Total: 0
- Time zone: UTC+3:30 (IRST)

Do Khaleh Kuh (Persian: دخاله كوه, also Romanized as Do Khāleh Kūh) is a village in Kharajgil Rural District, Asalem District, Talesh County, Gilan Province, Iran. At the 2006 census, its population was 12, in 4 families. In 2016, there no households residing in the village.
