= Rowham Beyk Mahalleh =

Rowham Beyk Mahalleh روهام بيك محله
- Village
- Location within Iran
- Coordinates: 37°43′30″N 48°57′59″E
- Country: Iran
- Province: Gilan
- County: Talesh
- Bakhsh: Asalem
- Rural District: Asalem

Population (2006)
  - Total: 248
- Time zone: UTC+3:30 (IRST)
  - Summer (DST): UTC+4:30 (IRDT)

Rowham Beyk Mahalleh (Persian: روهام بيك محله, also Romanized as Rowhām Beyk Maḩalleh; also known as Rahāmbak Maḩalleh and Rowḩām Beyg Maḩalleh) is a village in Asalem Rural District, Asalem District, Talesh County, Gilan Province, Iran. At the 2006 census, its population was 248, in 66 families.
