= Qandi Sara =

Qandi Sara قندي سرا
- Village
- Location within Iran
- Coordinates: 37°43′17″N 48°58′49″E
- Country: Iran
- Province: Gilan
- County: Talesh
- Bakhsh: Asalem
- Rural District: Asalem

Population (2006)
  - Total: 94
- Time zone: UTC+3:30 (IRST)
  - Summer (DST): UTC+4:30 (IRDT)

Qandi Sara (Persian: قندي سرا, also Romanized as Qandī Sarā) is a village in Asalem Rural District, Asalem District, Talesh County, Gilan Province, Iran. At the 2006 census, its population was 94, in 27 families.
