= Lachu Mahalleh =

Lachu Mahalleh لاچومحله
- Village
- Location within Iran
- Coordinates: 37°41′59″N 48°58′59″E
- Country: Iran
- Province: Gilan
- County: Talesh
- Bakhsh: Asalem
- Rural District: Asalem

Population (2006)
  - Total: 441
- Time zone: UTC+3:30 (IRST)
  - Summer (DST): UTC+4:30 (IRDT)

Lachu Mahalleh (Persian: لاچومحله, also romanized as Lāchū Maḩalleh; also known as Lācheh Maḩalleh) is a village in Asalem Rural District, Asalem District, Talesh County, Gilan Province, Iran. At the 2006 census, its population was 441 across 109 families.
