= Asb Buni =

Asb Buni اسب بونی
- Village
- Location within Iran
- Coordinates: 37°37′44″N 48°47′23″E
- Country: Iran
- Province: Gilan
- County: Talesh
- Bakhsh: Asalem
- Rural District: Kharajgil

Population (2016)
  - Total: 102
- Time zone: UTC+3:30 (IRST)

Asb Buni (Persian: اسب بونی, also Romanized as Āsb Būnī; also known as Asbeh Būnī) is a village in Kharajgil Rural District, Asalem District, Talesh County, Gilan Province, Iran. At the 2016 census, its population was 102, in 33 families, an increase from 47 people in 2006.
