= Vishkhes Mahalleh =

Vishkhes Mahalleh ويش خس محله
- Village
- Location within Iran
- Coordinates: 37°41′16″N 48°58′39″E
- Country: Iran
- Province: Gilan
- County: Talesh
- Bakhsh: Asalem
- Rural District: Khaleh Sara

Population (2016)
  - Total: 392
- Time zone: UTC+3:30 (IRST)

Vishkhes Mahalleh (Persian: ويش خس محله, also Romanized as Vīshkhes Maḩalleh; also known as Vīshkheşeh Maḩalleh) is a village in Khaleh Sara Rural District, Asalem District, Talesh County, Gilan Province, Iran.

At the time of the 2006 National Census, the village's population was 324 in 84 households. The 2011 census counted 347 people in 107 households. The 2016 census measured the population of the village as 392 people in 133 households.
