= Si Bostan =

Si Bostan سي بستان
- Village
- Country: Iran
- Province: Gilan
- County: Talesh
- Bakhsh: Asalem
- Rural District: Kharajgil

Population (2006)
  - Total: 16
- Time zone: UTC+3:30 (IRST)

Si Bostan (Persian: سي بستان, also Romanized as Sī Bostān) is a village in Kharajgil Rural District, Asalem District, Talesh County, Gilan Province, Iran. At the 2006 census, its population was 16, in 4 families. Decreased from 69 people in 2006.
