= Latain =

Latain لتعین
- Village
- Location within Iran
- Coordinates: 37°39′17″N 48°59′39″E
- Country: Iran
- Province: Gilan
- County: Talesh
- Bakhsh: Asalem
- Rural District: Khaleh Sara

Population (2016)
  - Total: 260
- Time zone: UTC+3:30 (IRST)

Latain (Persian: لتعين, also Romanized as Lata’īn; also known as Lataeen) is a village in Khaleh Sara Rural District, Asalem District, Talesh County, Gilan Province, Iran.

At the time of the 2006 National Census, the village's population was 297 in 64 households. The 2011 census counted 278 people in 94 households. The 2016 census measured the population of the village as 260 people in 88 households.
