= Khalyan =

Khalyan or Khalian (Persian: خليان) may refer to:

- Khalian, Gilan
- Khalyan, West Azerbaijan
- Khalyan, Baghlan a village in Baghlan province Afghanistan
