= Miandeh, Talesh =

Village in Gilan province, Iran

Miandeh Persian: ميانده
- Village
- Location within Iran
- Coordinates: 37.7°N 49.01°E
- Country: Iran
- Province: Gilan
- County: Talesh
- District: Asalem
- Rural District: Khaleh Sara

Population (2016)
  - Total: 463
- Time zone: UTC+3:30 (IRST)

Miandeh (Persian: ميانده) (Note: Also romanized as Mīāndeh; formerly known as Miandeh-ye Pain (ميانده پائين), also romanized as Mīāndeh-ye Pā’īn) is a village in Khaleh Sara Rural District of Asalem District in Talesh County, Gilan province, Iran.

== Demographics ==
=== Population ===
At the time of the 2006 National Census, the village's population, as Miandeh-ye Pain, was 134 in 28 households, when it was in Asalem Rural District. The 2011 census counted 459 people in 143 households, by which time it had been transferred to Khaleh Sara Rural District. The 2016 census measured the population of the village as 463 people in 144 households, when it was listed as Miandeh.
