= Nav-e Pain =

Nav-e Pain ناو پائين
- Neighbourhood
- Location within Iran
- Coordinates: 37°43′35″N 48°57′00″E
- Country: Iran
- Province: Gilan
- County: Talesh
- Bakhsh: Asalem
- City: Asalem

Population (2006)
  - Total: 1,643
- Time zone: UTC+3:30 (IRST)

Nav-e Pain (Persian: ناو پائين, also Romanized as Nāv-e Pā’īn) is a neighborhood in the city of Asalem in Asalem District of Talesh County, Gilan Province, Iran. It is south of Asalem Downtown and north of Gilandeh neighborhood.

It was formerly a village in Kharajgil Rural District. At the 2006 census, its population was 1,643, in 380 families. It was incorporated into Asalem city between 2006 and 2011.
