= Hajj Shahbaz Mahalleh =

Hajj Shahbaz Mahalleh حاج شهبازمحله
- Village
- Location within Iran
- Coordinates: 37°43′53″N 48°59′11″E
- Country: Iran
- Province: Gilan
- County: Talesh
- Bakhsh: Asalem
- Rural District: Asalem

Population (2006)
  - Total: 338
- Time zone: UTC+3:30 (IRST)
  - Summer (DST): UTC+4:30 (IRDT)

Hajj Shahbaz Mahalleh (Persian: حاج شهبازمحله, also Romanized as Ḩājj Shahbāz Maḩalleh; also known as Ḩājjī Shahbāz Maḩalleh) is a village in Asalem Rural District, Asalem District, Talesh County, Gilan Province, Iran. At the 2006 census, its population was 338, in 85 families.
