= Hajj Bahram Mahalleh =

Hajj Bahram Mahalleh حاج بهرام محله
- Village
- Location within Iran
- Coordinates: 37°43′33″N 48°58′48″E
- Country: Iran
- Province: Gilan
- County: Talesh
- Bakhsh: Asalem
- Rural District: Asalem

Population (2006)
  - Total: 174
- Time zone: UTC+3:30 (IRST)
  - Summer (DST): UTC+4:30 (IRDT)

Hajj Bahram Mahalleh (Persian: حاج بهرام محله, also Romanized as Ḩājj Bahrām Maḩalleh; also known as Ḩājjī Bahrām Maḩalleh, Ḩājjī Bahrām and Nāvrūd-e Asālem) is a village in Asalem Rural District, Asalem District, Talesh County, Gilan Province, Iran. At the 2006 census, its population was 174, in 43 families.
