= Rostam Mahalleh =

Rostam Mahalleh رستم محله
- Village
- Location within Iran
- Coordinates: 37°44′13″N 48°59′29″E
- Country: Iran
- Province: Gilan
- County: Talesh
- Bakhsh: Asalem
- Rural District: Asalem

Population (2006)
  - Total: 208
- Time zone: UTC+3:30 (IRST)
  - Summer (DST): UTC+4:30 (IRDT)

Rostam Mahalleh (Persian: رستم محله, also Romanized as Rostam Maḩalleh) is a village in Asalem Rural District, Asalem District, Talesh County, Gilan Province, Iran. At the 2006 census, its population was 208 people with 46 families.
