= Siah Alam =

Village in Gilan province, Iran

Siah Alam Persian: سياه علم
- Village
- Location within Iran
- Coordinates: 37.692°N 49.014°E
- Country: Iran
- Province: Gilan
- County: Talesh
- District: Asalem
- Rural District: Khaleh Sara

Population (2016)
  - Total: 136
- Time zone: UTC+3:30 (IRST)

Siah Alam (Persian: سياه علم) (Note: Also romanized as Sīāh Alam) is a village in Khaleh Sara Rural District of Asalem District in Talesh County, Gilan province, Iran.

== Demographics ==
=== Population ===
The 2011 census counted a population of 110 people in 37 households. The 2016 census measured the population of the village as 136 people in 48 households.
