= Metesh =

Metesh متش
- Village
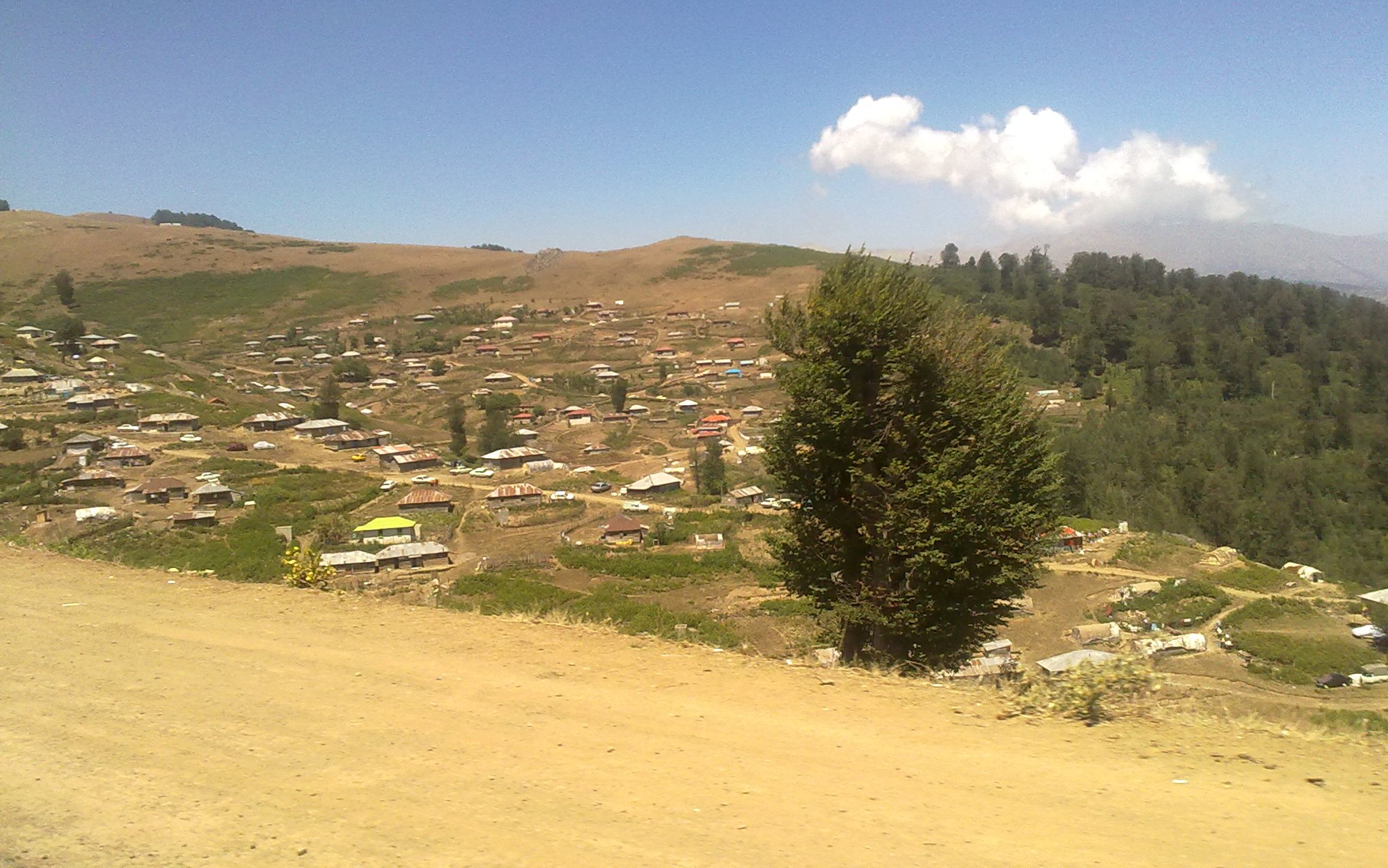
- Metesh in Summer

- Location within Iran
- Coordinates: 37°37′30″N 48°45′39″E
- Country: Iran
- Province: Gilan
- County: Talesh
- Bakhsh: Asalem
- Rural District: Kharajgil

Population (2016)
  - Total: 7
- Time zone: UTC+3:30 (IRST)

Metesh (Persian: متش) is a village in Kharajgil Rural District, Asalem District, Talesh County, Gilan Province, Iran. At the 2006 census, its population was 13, in 5 families. Decreased to 7 people and 4 families in 2016.
