= Jangemireh =

Jangemireh جنگ ميره
- Village
- Location within Iran
- Coordinates: 37°42′11″N 48°57′00″E
- Country: Iran
- Province: Gilan
- County: Talesh
- Bakhsh: Asalem
- Rural District: Asalem

Population (2006)
  - Total: 181
- Time zone: UTC+3:30 (IRST)
  - Summer (DST): UTC+4:30 (IRDT)

Jangemireh (Persian: جنگ ميره, also Romanized as Jangemīreh) is a village in Asalem Rural District, Asalem District, Talesh County, Gilan Province, Iran. At the 2006 census, its population was 181, in 39 families.
