= Ali Sara =

Ali Sara (Persian: عليسرا) may refer to:

- Ali Sara, Fuman
- Ali Sara, Rasht
- Ali Sara, Shaft
- Ali Sara, Talesh
