= Taher Beyk Mahalleh =

Taher Beyk Mahalleh طاهربيك محله
- Village
- Location within Iran
- Coordinates: 37°43′34″N 48°58′05″E
- Country: Iran
- Province: Gilan
- County: Talesh
- Bakhsh: Asalem
- Rural District: Asalem

Population (2006)
  - Total: 269
- Time zone: UTC+3:30 (IRST)
  - Summer (DST): UTC+4:30 (IRDT)

Taher Beyk Mahalleh (Persian: طاهربيك محله, also Romanized as Ţāher Beyk Maḩalleh; also known as Ţāher Beyk) is a village in Asalem Rural District, Asalem District, Talesh County, Gilan Province, Iran. At the 2006 census, its population was 269, in 63 families.
