= Taqi Sara =

Taqi Sara تقي سرا
- Village
- Location within Iran
- Coordinates: 37°42′44″N 48°58′43″E
- Country: Iran
- Province: Gilan
- County: Talesh
- Bakhsh: Asalem
- Rural District: Asalem

Population (2006)
  - Total: 262
- Time zone: UTC+3:30 (IRST)
  - Summer (DST): UTC+4:30 (IRDT)

Taqi Sara (Persian: تقي سرا, also Romanized as Taqī Sarā; also known as Nāvehrūd and Taqī Maḩalleh) is a village in Asalem Rural District, Asalem District, Talesh County, Gilan Province, Iran. At the 2006 census, its population was 262, in 59 families.
