= Gilak Mahalleh-ye Alalan =

Gilak Mahalleh-ye Alalan گيلك محله الالان
- Village
- Location within Iran
- Coordinates: 37°42′41″N 48°59′58″E
- Country: Iran
- Province: Gilan
- County: Talesh
- Bakhsh: Asalem
- Rural District: Asalem

Population (2006)
  - Total: 400
- Time zone: UTC+3:30 (IRST)
  - Summer (DST): UTC+4:30 (IRDT)

Gilak Mahalleh-ye Alalan (Persian: گيلك محله الالان, also Romanized as Gīlak Maḩalleh-ye Ālālān; also known as Gīlakmaḩalleh) is a village in Asalem Rural District, Asalem District, Talesh County, Gilan Province, Iran. At the 2006 census, its population was 400, in 93 families.
