= Alalan-e Qadim =

Alalan-e Qadim الالان قديم
- Village
- Location within Iran
- Coordinates: 37°42′52″N 49°00′11″E
- Country: Iran
- Province: Gilan
- County: Talesh
- Bakhsh: Asalem
- Rural District: Asalem

Population (2006)
  - Total: 235
- Time zone: UTC+3:30 (IRST)
  - Summer (DST): UTC+4:30 (IRDT)

Alalan-e Qadim (Persian: الالان قديم, also Romanized as Ālālān-e Qadīm; also known as Ālālān, Ālālān-e Jadīd, Bāzār Ālālān, and Ellalan) is a village in Asalem Rural District, Asalem District, Talesh County, Gilan Province, Iran. At the 2006 census, its population was 235, in 62 families.
