= Chovazhiyeh =

Chovazhiyeh چوواژيه
- Village
- Location within Iran
- Coordinates: 37°35′51″N 48°49′26″E
- Country: Iran
- Province: Gilan
- County: Talesh
- Bakhsh: Asalem
- Rural District: Kharajgil

Population (2016)
  - Total: 29
- Time zone: UTC+3:30 (IRST)

Chovazhiyeh (Persian: چوواژيه, also Romanized as Chovāzhīyeh; also known as Chūzhāyeh and Chūzhīyeh) is a village in Kharajgil Rural District, Asalem District, Talesh County, Gilan Province, Iran. At the 2006 census, its population was 29, in 8 families. Decreased from 62 people in 2006.
