= Larzdeh =

Larzdeh لرزده
- Village
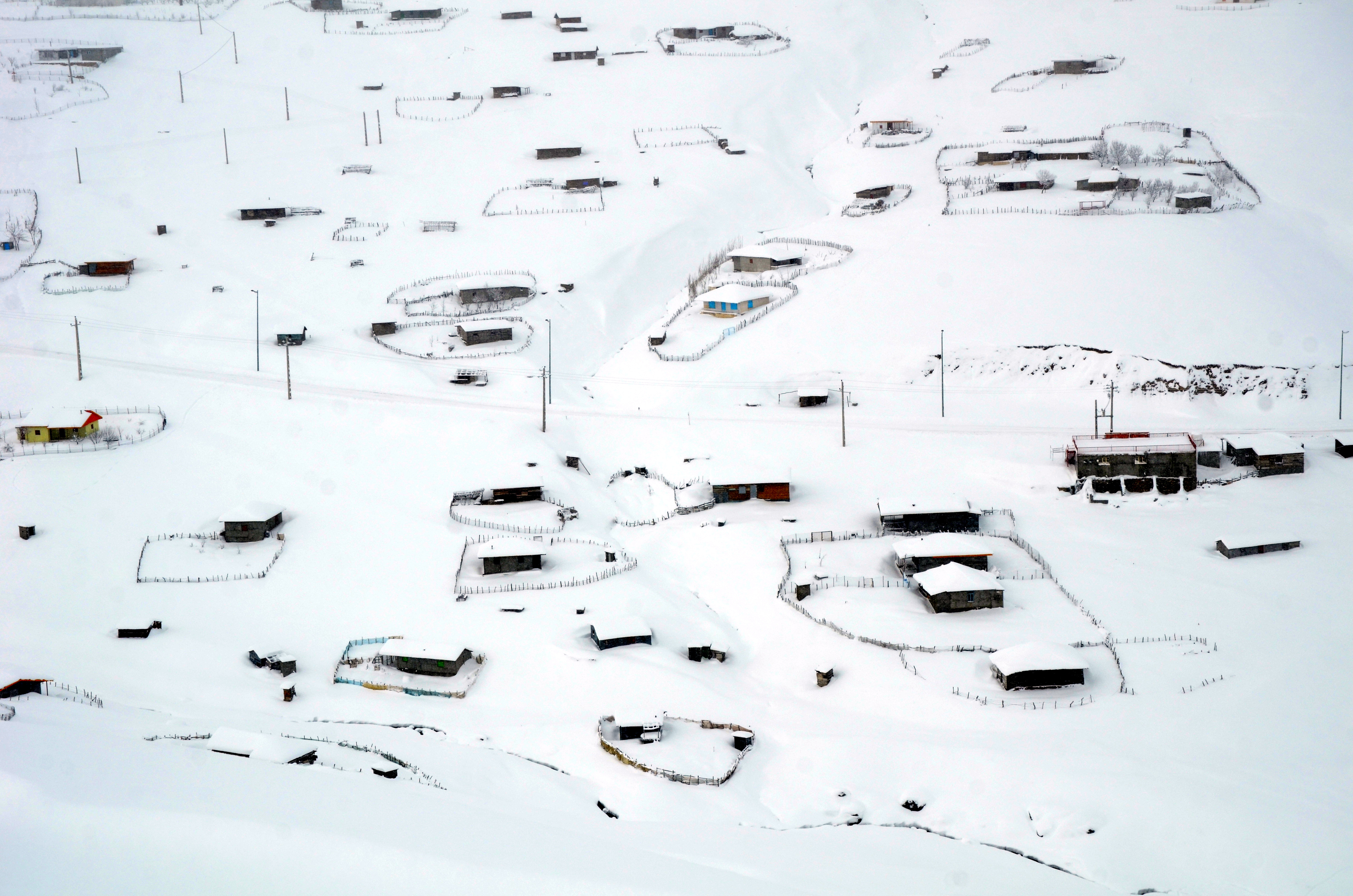

- Location within Iran
- Coordinates: 37°36′01″N 48°43′52″E
- Country: Iran
- Province: Gilan
- County: Talesh
- Bakhsh: Asalem
- Rural District: Kharajgil

Population (2006)
  - Total: 8
- Time zone: UTC+3:30 (IRST)

Larzdeh (Persian: لرزده) is a village in Kharajgil Rural District, Asalem District, Talesh County, Gilan Province, Iran. At the 2006 census, its population was 8, in 4 families. In 2016, the village had less than 4 households and its population was not reported.
