= Hajjiyeh Mahalleh =

Hajjiyeh Mahalleh حاجيه محله
- Village
- Location within Iran
- Coordinates: 37°44′42″N 48°58′36″E
- Country: Iran
- Province: Gilan
- County: Talesh
- Bakhsh: Asalem
- Rural District: Asalem

Population (2006)
  - Total: 170
- Time zone: UTC+3:30 (IRST)
  - Summer (DST): UTC+4:30 (IRDT)

Hajjiyeh Mahalleh (Persian: حاجيه محله, also Romanized as Ḩājjīyeh Maḩalleh; also known as Ḩājjī Maḩalleh) is a village in Asalem Rural District, Asalem District, Talesh County, Gilan Province, Iran. At the 2006 census, its population was 170, in 40 families.
