= Khaleh Saray =

Khaleh Saray (Persian: خاله سراي), also rendered as Khalehsara, may refer to:

- Khaleh Saray-e Panjah va Haft
- Khaleh Saray-e Panjah va Noh
