= Bodagh Mahalleh, Talesh =

Bodagh Mahalleh بداغ محله
- Village
- Location within Iran
- Coordinates: 37°43′51″N 48°59′46″E
- Country: Iran
- Province: Gilan
- County: Talesh
- Bakhsh: Asalem
- Rural District: Asalem

Population (2006)
  - Total: 570
- Time zone: UTC+3:30 (IRST)
  - Summer (DST): UTC+4:30 (IRDT)

Bodagh Mahalleh (Persian: بداغ محله, also romanized as Bodāgh Maḩalleh) is a village in Asalem Rural District, Asalem District, Talesh County, Gilan Province, Iran. At the 2006 census, its population was 570, in 130 families.
