= Khataiyeh =

Khataiyeh خطائيه
- Village
- Location within Iran
- Coordinates: 37°35′57″N 48°46′52″E
- Country: Iran
- Province: Gilan
- County: Talesh
- Bakhsh: Asalem
- Rural District: Kharajgil

Population (2016)
  - Total: 66
- Time zone: UTC+3:30 (IRST)

Khataiyeh (Persian: خطائيه, also Romanized as Khaţā‘īyeh) is a village in Kharajgil Rural District, Asalem District, Talesh County, Gilan Province, Iran. At the 2016 census, its population was 66, in 21 families. Increased from 29 people in 2006.
