= Gisum =

Gisum گيسوم
- Village
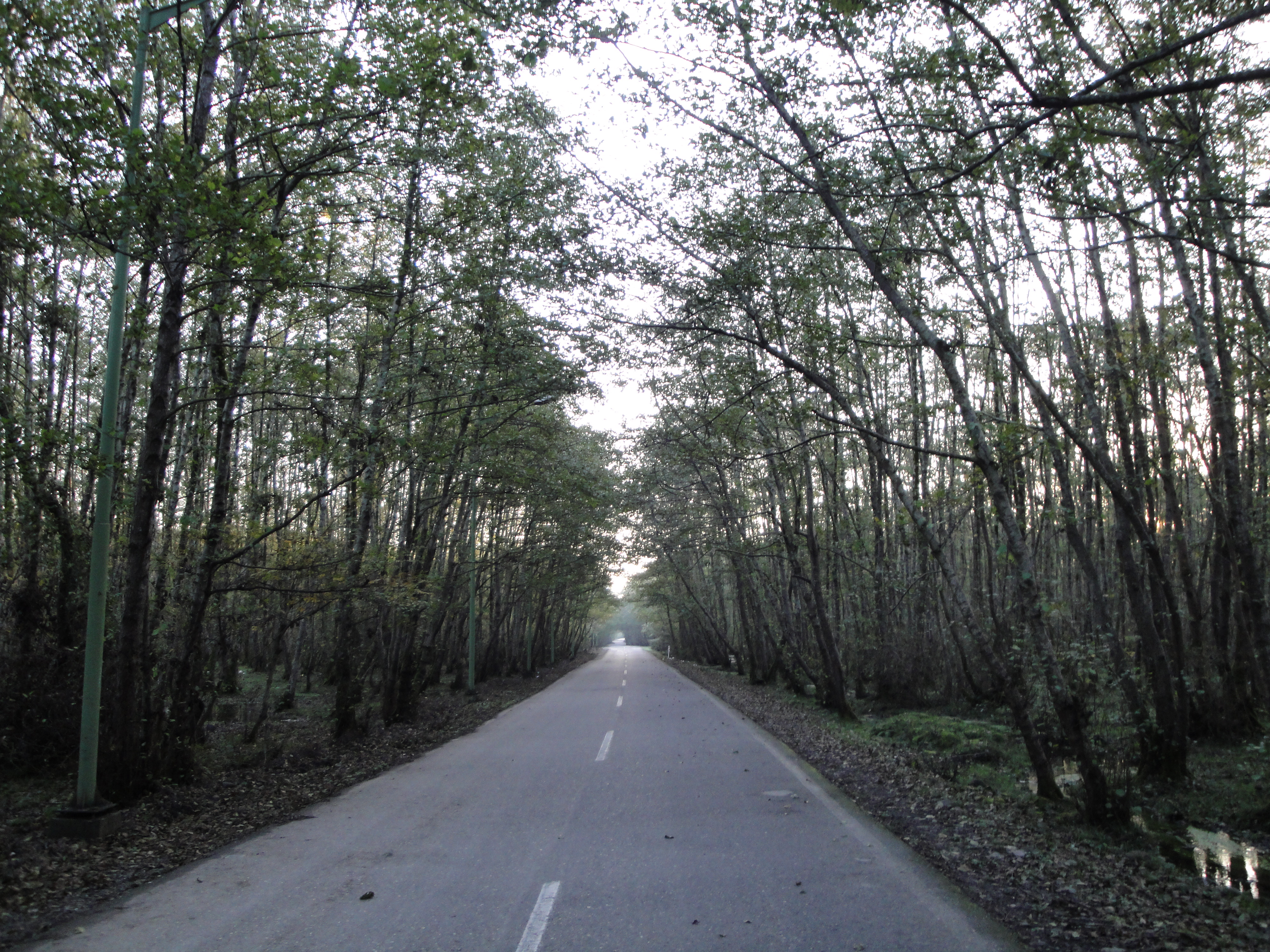
- Gisum Forest

- Location within Iran
- Coordinates: 37°39′49″N 49°01′18″E
- Country: Iran
- Province: Gilan
- County: Talesh
- Bakhsh: Asalem
- Rural District: Khaleh Sara

Population (2016)
  - Total: 233
- Time zone: UTC+3:30 (IRST)

Gisum (Persian: گيسوم, also Romanized as Gīsūm; also known as Gīsom and Gīsūm-e Bālā) is a village in Khaleh Sara Rural District, Asalem District, Talesh County, Gilan Province, Iran. At the 2016 census, its population was 233, in 84 families. Up from 218 in 2006.
