= Rangarj Mahalleh =

Rangarj Mahalleh رنگرج محله
- Village
- Location within Iran
- Coordinates: 37°41′18″N 48°58′14″E
- Country: Iran
- Province: Gilan
- County: Talesh
- Bakhsh: Asalem
- Rural District: Khaleh Sara

Population (2016)
  - Total: 71
- Time zone: UTC+3:30 (IRST)

Rangarj Mahalleh (Persian: رنگرج محله, also Romanized as Rangarj Maḩalleh) is a village in Khaleh Sara Rural District, Asalem District, Talesh County, Gilan Province, Iran.

At the time of the 2006 National Census, the village's population was 71 in 21 households. The 2011 census counted 76 people in 22 households. The 2016 census measured the population of the village as 71 people in 23 households.
