= Vardeh Sara =

Village in Gilan province, Iran

Vardeh Sara Persian: وارده سرا
- Village
- Location within Iran
- Coordinates: 37°41′57″N 48°57′44″E
- Country: Iran
- Province: Gilan
- County: Talesh
- District: Asalem
- Rural District: Asalem

Population (2016)
  - Total: 739
- Time zone: UTC+3:30 (IRST)

Vardeh Sara (Persian: وارده سرا) (Note: Also romanized as Vārdeh Sarā; also known as Vārdeh Sar, Vāredeh Sarā, Vāredeh Sarā-ye Pā’īn, Varudakhsar, Varūdsar, and Warūdahsar) is a village in Asalem Rural District of Asalem District in Talesh County, Gilan province, Iran.

== Demographics ==
=== Population ===
At the time of the 2006 National Census, the village's population was 296 in 77 households. The following census in 2011 counted 694 people in 205 households. The 2016 census measured the population of the village as 739 people in 237 households.
