= Khaneqah Bala va Pain =

Village in Gilan province, Iran

Khaneqah Bala va Pain Persian: خانقاه بالاوپائين
- Village
- Location within Iran
- Coordinates: 37°42′07″N 48°59′45″E
- Country: Iran
- Province: Gilan
- County: Talesh
- District: Asalem
- Rural District: Asalem

Population (2016)
  - Total: 526
- Time zone: UTC+3:30 (IRST)

Khaneqah Bala va Pain (Persian: خانقاه بالاوپائين) (Note: Also romanized as Khāneqāh Bālā va Pā’īn; also known as Khal’ge, Khānegāh-e Bālā, Khāneqāh, and Khangah) is a village in Asalem Rural District of Asalem District in Talesh County, Gilan province, Iran.

== Demographics ==
=== Population ===
At the time of the 2006 National Census, the village's population was 823 in 173 households. The following census in 2011 counted 489 people in 140 households. The 2016 census measured the population of the village as 526 people in 159 households.
