= Khalian, Gilan =

Khalian خليان
- Village
- Location within Iran
- Coordinates: 37°38′24″N 48°42′41″E
- Country: Iran
- Province: Gilan
- County: Talesh
- Bakhsh: Asalem
- Rural District: Kharajgil

Population (2006)
  - Total: 111
- Time zone: UTC+3:30 (IRST)

Khalian (Persian: خليان, also Romanized as Khalīān and Khalyān) is a village in Kharajgil Rural District, Asalem District, Talesh County, Gilan Province, Iran. At the 2006 census, its population was 111, in 25 families. In 2016, the village had less than 4 families and its population was not recorded.
