= Lavabon =

Village in Gilan province, Iran

Lavabon Persian: لوابن
- Village
- Location within Iran
- Coordinates: 37°43′13″N 48°56′47″E
- Country: Iran
- Province: Gilan
- County: Talesh
- District: Asalem
- Rural District: Kharajgil

Population (2016)
  - Total: 588
- Time zone: UTC+3:30 (IRST)

Lavabon (Persian: لوابن) (Note: Also romanized as Lavābon) is a village in Kharajgil Rural District of Asalem District in Talesh County, Gilan province, Iran.

== Demographics ==
=== Population ===
At the time of the 2006 National Census, the village's population was 514 in 117 households. The following census in 2011 counted 572 people in 159 households. The 2016 census measured the population of the village as 588 people in 177 households.
