= Molla Mahalleh, Talesh =

Village in Gilan province, Iran

Molla Mahalleh Persian: ملامحله
- Village
- Location within Iran
- Coordinates: 37°43′03″N 48°59′05″E
- Country: Iran
- Province: Gilan
- County: Talesh
- District: Asalem
- Rural District: Khaleh Sara

Population (2016)
  - Total: 422
- Time zone: UTC+3:30 (IRST)

Molla Mahalleh (Persian: ملامحله) (Note: Also romanized as Mollā Maḩalleh; also known as Mollā Maḩalleh-ye 59, and Mollā Maḩalleh-ye Panjāh-o-noh) is a village in Khaleh Sara Rural District of Asalem District in Talesh County, Gilan province, Iran.

== Demographics ==
=== Population ===
At the time of the 2006 National Census, the village's population was 276 in 68 households. The 2011 census counted 467 people in 127 households. The 2016 census measured the population of the village as 422 people in 138 households.
