= Siah Bil, Talesh =

Village in Gilan province, Iran

Siah Bil Persian: سياه بيل
- Village
- Location within Iran
- Coordinates: 37°38′59″N 48°58′44″E
- Country: Iran
- Province: Gilan
- County: Talesh
- District: Asalem
- Rural District: Khaleh Sara

Population (2016)
  - Total: 425
- Time zone: UTC+3:30 (IRST)

Siah Bil (Persian: سياه بيل) (Note: Also romanized as Sīāh Bīl) is a village in Khaleh Sara Rural District of Asalem District in Talesh County, Gilan province, Iran.

== Demographics ==
=== Population ===
At the time of the 2006 National Census, the village's population was 390 in 96 households. The 2011 census counted 407 people in 117 households. The 2016 census measured the population of the village as 425 people in 142 households.
