= Ali Sara, Talesh =

Ali Sara علی سرا
- Village
- Location within Iran
- Coordinates: 37°40′52″N 49°02′15″E
- Country: Iran
- Province: Gilan
- County: Talesh
- Bakhsh: Asalem
- Rural District: Khaleh Sara

Population (2016)
  - Total: 248
- Time zone: UTC+3:30 (IRST)

Ali Sara (Persian: علی سرا, also Romanized as ‘Alī Sarā) is a village in Khaleh Sara Rural District, Asalem District, Talesh County, Gilan Province, Iran.

At the time of the 2006 National Census, the village's population was 251 in 61 households. The 2011 census counted 234 people in 71 households. The 2016 census measured the population of the village as 248 people in 79 households.
