= Nov =

Nov or NOV may refer to:

- November, the 11th month of the year in the Julian and Gregorian calendars
- Nav, Asalem (also ناو, Nov or Nāv), a village in Gilan Province, Iran
- Nov, Golan Heights, an Israeli moshav (a cooperative agricultural community) on the Israeli-occupied Golan Heights
- Nov district, former name of Spitamen District, Sughd Province, Tajikistan
- Nov, Tajikistan, a locality in Sughd Region of Tajikistan
- Nov, a former name of Navkat, a town in Sughd Region of Tajikistan
- Nob, Israel (also Nov), a biblical location near Jerusalem
- Albano Machado Airport (IATA airport code NOV), an airport in Huambo, Angola
- Novena MRT station (MRT station abbreviation NOV), a Mass Rapid Transit station in Novena, Singapore
- Nation of Violence, the nickname of professional wrestler Samoa Joe
- NOV Inc., an oil rig manufacturer.
- NC Vouliagmeni (Ναυτικός Όμιλος Βουλιαγμένης, Nautikós Ómilos Vouliagménis), a Greek aquatic sports club
- Non obstante verdicto (also JNOV, judgment notwithstanding the verdict), a plea in a U.S. civil lawsuit that the judge should overrule a jury finding as unreasonable and wrong
- NOV (gene), "nephroblastoma overexpressed", a gene coding for signaling proteins
- News Overview, articles index file format used by Usenet servers and newsreaders
- Novial (ISO 639-3 code nov), a constructed international auxiliary language
- People's Liberation Army of Macedonia (Narodno Osloboditelna Vojska), a Communist resistance army during World War II
