= Gotag Sara =

Village in Gilan province, Iran

Gotag Sara Persian: گتگسرا
- Village
- Location within Iran
- Coordinates: 37°41′12″N 49°01′56″E
- Country: Iran
- Province: Gilan
- County: Talesh
- District: Asalem
- Rural District: Khaleh Sara

Population (2016)
  - Total: 649
- Time zone: UTC+3:30 (IRST)

Gotag Sara (Persian: گتگسرا) (Note: Also romanized as Getge Sara, Getge Sarā, and Gotag Sarā; also known as Gatgesar, Gatka-Saray, Gatkah Sarāi, Gatkasarā, and Kangeh Sarāy) is a village in Khaleh Sara Rural District of Asalem District in Talesh County, Gilan province, Iran.

== Demographics ==
=== Population ===
At the time of the 2006 National Census, the village's population was 576 in 134 households. The 2011 census counted 612 people in 201 households. The 2016 census measured the population of the village as 649 people in 201 households.
