= Pir-e Harat =

Village in Gilan province, Iran

Pir-e Harat Persian: پيرهرات
- Village
- Location within Iran
- Coordinates: 37°40′56″N 48°58′03″E
- Country: Iran
- Province: Gilan
- County: Talesh
- District: Asalem
- Rural District: Khaleh Sara

Population (2016)
  - Total: 907
- Time zone: UTC+3:30 (IRST)

Pir-e Harat (Persian: پيرهرات) (Note: Also romanized as Pīr-e Harāt) is a village in Khaleh Sara Rural District of Asalem District in Talesh County, Gilan province, Iran.

== Demographics ==
=== Language and religion ===
It is a predominately Talysh speaking and Sunni village.

=== Population ===
At the time of the 2006 National Census, the village's population was 948 in 232 households. The 2011 census counted 1,009 people in 310 households. The 2016 census measured the population of the village as 907 people in 278 households.
