= Lakateshem =

Village in Gilan province, Iran

Lakateshem Persian: لاكاتشم
- Village
- Location within Iran
- Coordinates: 37°41′10″N 48°50′03″E
- Country: Iran
- Province: Gilan
- County: Talesh
- District: Asalem
- Rural District: Kharajgil

Population (2016)
  - Total: 211
- Time zone: UTC+3:30 (IRST)

Lakateshem (Persian: لاكاتشم) (Note: Also romanized as Lākāteshem; also known as Lākatāshūn) is a village in Kharajgil Rural District of Asalem District in Talesh County, Gilan province, Iran.

== Demographics ==
=== Population ===
At the time of the 2006 National Census, the village's population was 198 in 36 households. The following census in 2011 counted 217 people in 55 households. The 2016 census measured the population of the village as 211 people in 57 households.
