= Deraz Mahalleh =

Deraz Mahalleh (Persian: درازمحله) may refer to:

- Deraz Mahalleh, Gilan
- Deraz Mahalleh, Mazandaran
