= Khaleh Saray-e Panjah va Noh =

Khaleh Saray-e Panjah va Noh خاله سرای پنجاه ونه
- Village
- Location within Iran
- Coordinates: 37°41′32″N 48°59′11″E
- Country: Iran
- Province: Gilan
- County: Talesh
- Bakhsh: Asalem
- Rural District: Khaleh Sara

Population (2016)
  - Total: 374
- Time zone: UTC+3:30 (IRST)

Khaleh Saray-e Panjah va Noh (Persian: خاله سرای پنجاه ونه, also Romanized as Khāleh Sarāy-e Panjāh va Noh; also known as Khālehsarā-ye Panjāhonoh) is a village in Khaleh Sara Rural District, Asalem District, Talesh County, Gilan Province, Iran.

At the time of the 2006 National Census, the village's population was 408 in 100 households. The 2011 census counted 378 people in 111 households. The 2016 census measured the population of the village as 374 people in 114 households.
