= Narenj Dul =

Village in Gilan province, Iran

Narenj Dul Persian: نارنج دول
- Village
- Location within Iran
- Coordinates: 37°43′26″N 48°55′55″E
- Country: Iran
- Province: Gilan
- County: Talesh
- District: Asalem
- Rural District: Asalem

Population (2016)
  - Total: 682
- Time zone: UTC+3:30 (IRST)

Narenj Dul (Persian: نارنج دول) (Note: Also romanized as Nārenj Dūl; also known as Nārenj Dūleh and Nārenjeh Dūl) is a village in Asalem Rural District of Asalem District in Talesh County, Gilan province, Iran.

== Demographics ==
=== Population ===
At the time of the 2006 National Census, the village's population was 585 in 127 households. The following census in 2011 counted 648 people in 193 households. The 2016 census measured the population of the village as 682 people in 213 households.
