= Owleh Kari-ye Asalem =

Village in Gilan province, Iran

Owleh Kari-ye Asalem Persian: اوله کري اسالم
- Village
- Location within Iran
- Coordinates: 37°44′12″N 48°56′16″E
- Country: Iran
- Province: Gilan
- County: Talesh
- District: Asalem
- Rural District: Asalem

Population (2016)
  - Total: 1,177
- Time zone: UTC+3:30 (IRST)

Owleh Kari-ye Asalem (Persian: اوله کري اسالم) (Note: Also romanized as Owleh Karī-ye Āsālem, Uleh Kari Asalem, and Ūleh Karī Āsālem; also known as Ūlākerī and Ūleh Karīm) is a village in Asalem Rural District of Asalem District in Talesh County, Gilan province, Iran.

== Demographics ==
=== Population ===
At the time of the 2006 National Census, the village's population was 847 in 203 households. The following census in 2011 counted 1,083 people in 310 households. The 2016 census measured the population of the village as 1,177 people in 371 households.
