= Gijow =

Village in Gilan province, Iran

Gijow Persian: گيجو
- Village
- Location within Iran
- Coordinates: 37°41′26″N 48°51′24″E
- Country: Iran
- Province: Gilan
- County: Talesh
- District: Asalem
- Rural District: Kharajgil

Population (2016)
  - Total: 962
- Time zone: UTC+3:30 (IRST)

Gijow (Persian: گيجو) (Note: Also romanized as Gījow and Gījū) is a village in Kharajgil Rural District of Asalem District in Talesh County, Gilan province, Iran.

== Demographics ==
=== Population ===
At the time of the 2006 National Census, the village's population was 845 in 184 households. The following census in 2011 counted 941 people in 242 households. The 2016 census measured the population of the village as 962 people in 271 households.
