= Karband =

Village in Gilan province, Iran

Karband Persian: كاربند
- Village
- Location within Iran
- Coordinates: 37°43′51″N 48°56′41″E
- Country: Iran
- Province: Gilan
- County: Talesh
- District: Asalem
- Rural District: Asalem

Population (2016)
  - Total: 967
- Time zone: UTC+3:30 (IRST)

Karband (Persian: كاربند) (Note: Also romanized as Kārband; also known as Kārban) is a village in Asalem Rural District of Asalem District in Talesh County, Gilan province, Iran.

== Demographics ==
=== Population ===
At the time of the 2006 National Census, the village's population was 407 in 90 households. The following census in 2011 counted 845 people in 272 households. The 2016 census measured the population of the village as 967 people in 310 households.
