= Kalah Sara =

Village in Gilan province, Iran

Kalah Sara Persian: كله سرا
- Village
- Location within Iran
- Coordinates: 37°42′10″N 48°56′17″E
- Country: Iran
- Province: Gilan
- County: Talesh
- District: Asalem
- Rural District: Asalem

Population (2016)
  - Total: 1,041
- Time zone: UTC+3:30 (IRST)

Kalah Sara (Persian: كله سرا) (Note: Also romanized as Kalah Sarā and Kaleh Sarā) is a village in Asalem Rural District of Asalem District in Talesh County, Gilan province, Iran.

== Demographics ==
=== Population ===
At the time of the 2006 National Census, the village's population was 1,089 in 253 households. The following census in 2011 counted 1,104 people in 345 households. The 2016 census measured the population of the village as 1,041 people in 321 households.
