= Yari Mahalleh =

Village in Gilan province, Iran

Yari Mahalleh Persian: ياري محله
- Village
- Location within Iran
- Coordinates: 37°42′53″N 48°56′16″E
- Country: Iran
- Province: Gilan
- County: Talesh
- District: Asalem
- Rural District: Kharajgil

Population (2016)
  - Total: 253
- Time zone: UTC+3:30 (IRST)

Yari Mahalleh (Persian: ياري محله) (Note: Also romanized as Yārī Maḩalleh) is a village in Kharajgil Rural District of Asalem District in Talesh County, Gilan province, Iran.

== Demographics ==
=== Population ===
At the time of the 2006 National Census, the village's population was 192 in 42 households. The following census in 2011 counted 215 people in 61 households. The 2016 census measured the population of the village as 253 people in 73 households.
