= Chekhreh Mahalleh =

Village in Gilan province, Iran

Chekhreh Mahalleh Persian: چخره محله
- Village
- Location within Iran
- Coordinates: 37°42′43″N 48°56′03″E
- Country: Iran
- Province: Gilan
- County: Talesh
- District: Asalem
- Rural District: Asalem

Population (2016)
  - Total: 1,004
- Time zone: UTC+3:30 (IRST)

Chekhreh Mahalleh (Persian: چخره محله) (Note: Also romanized as Chekhreh Maḩalleh; also known as Chekhr Maḩalleh) is a village in Asalem Rural District of Asalem District in Talesh County, Gilan province, Iran.

== Demographics ==
=== Population ===
At the time of the 2006 National Census, the village's population was 849 in 196 households. The following census in 2011 counted 937 people in 267 households. The 2016 census measured the population of the village as 1,004 people in 293 households.
