= Lamir-e Sofla =

Village in Gilan province, Iran

Lamir-e Sofla Persian: لميرسفلي
- Village
- Location within Iran
- Coordinates: 37°45′10″N 48°58′25″E
- Country: Iran
- Province: Gilan
- County: Talesh
- District: Asalem
- Rural District: Asalem

Population (2016)
  - Total: 2,299
- Time zone: UTC+3:30 (IRST)

Lamir-e Sofla (Persian: لميرسفلي) (Note: Also romanized as Lamīr-e Soflá; also known as Lamīr-e Pā’īn, Lomar-e Bālā, and Lomar-e Soflá) is a village in Asalem Rural District of Asalem District in Talesh County, Gilan province, Iran.

== Demographics ==
=== Population ===
At the time of the 2006 National Census, the village's population was 2,370 in 534 households. The following census in 2011 counted 2,278 people in 651 households. The 2016 census measured the population of the village as 2,299 people in 715 households.
