= Digeh Sara =

Village in Gilan province, Iran

Digeh Sara Persian: ديگه سرا
- Village
- Location within Iran
- Coordinates: 37°38′21″N 48°59′32″E
- Country: Iran
- Province: Gilan
- County: Talesh
- District: Asalem
- Rural District: Khaleh Sara

Population (2016)
  - Total: 601
- Time zone: UTC+3:30 (IRST)

Digeh Sara (Persian: ديگه سرا) (Note: Also romanized as Dīgeh Sarā; also known as Dal‘eh Sarāi, Darkhāneh, Degah Sarāi, Degakh-Saray, Dekeh Sarā, Dīgeh Sarā-ye Pā’īn, and Dīkeh Sarā) is a village in Khaleh Sara Rural District of Asalem District in Talesh County, Gilan province, Iran.

== Demographics ==
=== Population ===
At the time of the 2006 National Census, the village's population was 624 in 140 households. The 2011 census counted 626 people in 189 households. The 2016 census measured the population of the village as 601 people in 181 households.
