= Bala Deh, Gilan =

Village in Gilan province, Iran

Bala Deh Persian: بالاده
- Village
- Location within Iran
- Coordinates: 37°44′39″N 48°56′48″E
- Country: Iran
- Province: Gilan
- County: Talesh
- District: Asalem
- Rural District: Asalem

Population (2016)
  - Total: 2,360
- Time zone: UTC+3:30 (IRST)

Bala Deh (Persian: بالاده) (Note: Also romanized as Bālā Deh; also known as Sekīnābād) is a village in Asalem Rural District of Asalem District in Talesh County, Gilan province, Iran.

== Demographics ==
=== Population ===
At the time of the 2006 National Census, the village's population was 2,379 in 524 households. The following census in 2011 counted 2,649 people in 713 households. The 2016 census measured the population of the village as 2,360 people in 725 households. It was the most populous village in its rural district.
