= Kharajgil =

Village in Gilan province, Iran

Kharajgil Persian: خرجگيل
- Village
- Location within Iran
- Coordinates: 37°42′43″N 48°54′21″E
- Country: Iran
- Province: Gilan
- County: Talesh
- District: Asalem
- Rural District: Kharajgil

Population (2016)
  - Total: 2,801
- Time zone: UTC+3:30 (IRST)

Kharajgil (Persian: خرجگيل) (Note: Also romanized as Kharajgīl, Khardzhegil’, Kharej Gil, Kharjagil, Kharjagīl, Kharjegīl, and Kharjgīl; also known as Harjehgil, Kharfehgīl, and Kharjegīl-e Bālā) is a village in, and the capital of, Kharajgil Rural District in Asalem District of Talesh County, Gilan province, Iran.

== Demographics ==
=== Population ===
At the time of the 2006 National Census, the village's population was 2,849 in 629 households. The following census in 2011 counted 2,819 people in 793 households. The 2016 census measured the population of the village as 2,801 people in 826 households. It was the most populous village in its rural district.
