= Nav-e Bala =

Nav-e Bala ناوبالا
- Village
- Location within Iran
- Coordinates: 37°38′39″N 48°39′39″E
- Country: Iran
- Province: Gilan
- County: Talesh
- Bakhsh: Asalem
- Rural District: Kharajgil

Population (2006)
  - Total: 54
- Time zone: UTC+3:30 (IRST)

Nav-e Bala (Persian: ناوبالا, also Romanized as Nāv-e Bālā) is a village in Kharajgil Rural District, Asalem District, Talesh County, Gilan Province, Iran. At the 2006 census, its population was 54, in 9 families. In 2016, the village had less than 4 households and its population was not reported.
