= Allah Deh, Khaleh Sara =

Village in Gilan province, Iran

Allah Deh Persian: الله ده
- Village
- Location within Iran
- Coordinates: 37°38′N 48°44′E
- Country: Iran
- Province: Gilan
- County: Talesh
- District: Asalem
- Rural District: Khaleh Sara

Population (2016)
  - Total: 668
- Time zone: UTC+3:30 (IRST)

Allah Deh (Persian: الله ده) (Note: Also romanized as Allāh Deh; also known as Alladi and Allyady) is a village in Khaleh Sara Rural District of Asalem District in Talesh County, Gilan province, Iran.

== Demographics ==
=== Population ===
At the time of the 2006 National Census, the village's population was 547 in 142 households. The 2011 census counted 539 people in 175 households. The 2016 census measured the population of the village as 668 people in 222 households.
