= Sheykh Sara =

Village in Gilan province, Iran

Sheykh Sara Persian: شيخ سرا
- Village
- Location within Iran
- Coordinates: 37°43′48″N 48°58′02″E
- Country: Iran
- Province: Gilan
- County: Talesh
- District: Asalem
- Rural District: Asalem

Population (2016)
  - Total: 521
- Time zone: UTC+3:30 (IRST)

Sheykh Sara (Persian: شيخ سرا) (Note: Also romanized as Sheykh Sarā) is a village in Asalem Rural District of Asalem District in Talesh County, Gilan province, Iran.

== Demographics ==
=== Population ===
At the time of the 2006 National Census, the village's population was 478 in 107 households. The following census in 2011 counted 496 people in 131 households. The 2016 census measured the population of the village as 521 people in 160 households.
