= Keshavar =

Village in Gilan province, Iran

Keshavar Persian: كشاور
- Village
- Location within Iran
- Country: Iran
- Province: Gilan
- County: Talesh
- District: Asalem
- Rural District: Kharajgil

Population (2016)
  - Total: 737
- Time zone: UTC+3:30 (IRST)

Keshavar (Persian: كشاور) (Note: Also romanized as Keshāvar) is a village in Kharajgil Rural District of Asalem District in Talesh County, Gilan province, Iran.

== Demographics ==
=== Population ===
At the time of the 2006 National Census, the village's population was 668 in 146 households. The following census in 2011 counted 634 people in 185 households. The 2016 census measured the population of the village as 737 people in 218 households.
