= Siah Chal, Talesh =

Village in Gilan province, Iran

Siah Chal Persian: سياه چال
- Village
- Location within Iran
- Coordinates: 37°44′57″N 48°59′14″E
- Country: Iran
- Province: Gilan
- County: Talesh
- District: Asalem
- Rural District: Asalem

Population (2016)
  - Total: 514
- Time zone: UTC+3:30 (IRST)

Siah Chal (Persian: سياه چال) (Note: Also romanized as Sīāh Chāl; also known as Ershād Maḩalleh and Siakhchal) is a village in Asalem Rural District of Asalem District in Talesh County, Gilan province, Iran.

== Demographics ==
=== Population ===
At the time of the 2006 National Census, the village's population was 528 in 136 households. The following census in 2011 counted 497 people in 150 households. The 2016 census measured the population of the village as 514 people in 166 households.
