= Deraz Mahalleh, Gilan =

Village in Gilan province, Iran

Deraz Mahalleh Persian: درازمحله
- Village
- Location within Iran
- Coordinates: 37°42′48″N 48°55′35″E
- Country: Iran
- Province: Gilan
- County: Talesh
- District: Asalem
- Rural District: Kharajgil

Population (2016)
  - Total: 676
- Time zone: UTC+3:30 (IRST)

Deraz Mahalleh (Persian: درازمحله) (Note: Also romanized as Derāz Maḩalleh) is a village in Kharajgil Rural District of Asalem District in Talesh County, Gilan province, Iran.

== Demographics ==
=== Population ===
At the time of the 2006 National Census, the village's population was 544 in 129 households. The following census in 2011 counted 643 people in 188 households. The 2016 census measured the population of the village as 676 people in 196 households.
