= Gilandeh, Kharajgil =

Village in Gilan province, Iran

Gilandeh Persian: گيلانده
- Village
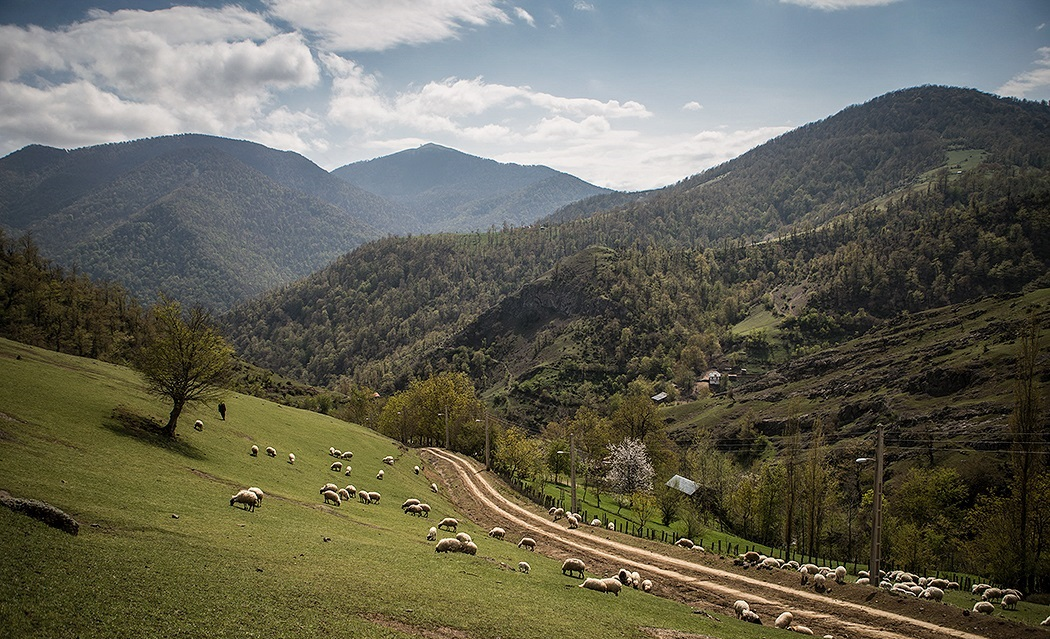
- Landscape near the village of Gilandeh in April 2018

- Location within Iran
- Coordinates: 37°36′03″N 48°47′59″E
- Country: Iran
- Province: Gilan
- County: Talesh
- District: Asalem
- Rural District: Kharajgil

Population (2016)
  - Total: 253
- Time zone: UTC+3:30 (IRST)

Gilandeh (Persian: گيلانده) (Note: Also romanized as Gīlān Deh and Gīlāndeh; also known as Gīlāndeh-e Yeylāq, Kalandeh, and Kalandekh) is a village in Kharajgil Rural District of Asalem District in Talesh County, Gilan province, Iran.

== Demographics ==
=== Population ===
At the time of the 2006 National Census, the village's population was 152 in 31 households. The following census in 2011 counted 139 people in 43 households. The 2016 census measured the population of the village as 253 people in 75 households.
