= Nav, Asalem =

Nav ناو
- Village
- Location within Iran
- Coordinates: 37°38′58″N 48°41′23″E
- Country: Iran
- Province: Gilan
- County: Talesh
- Bakhsh: Asalem
- Rural District: Kharajgil

Population (2016)
  - Total: 53
- Time zone: UTC+3:30 (IRST)

Nav (Persian: ناو, also Romanized as Nāv; also known as Nov) is a village in Kharajgil Rural District, Asalem District, Talesh County, Gilan Province, Iran. At the 2006 census, its population was 162, in 31 families. It decreased to 53 people and 17 households in 2016.
