= Gilandeh, Asalem =

Gilandeh, Khalifabad گيلانده، خلیف آباد
- Neighborhood
- Location within Iran
- Coordinates: 37°41′23″N 48°57′32″E
- Country: Iran
- Province: Gilan
- County: Talesh
- Bakhsh: Asalem
- City: Asalem

Population (2006)
  - Total: 4,273
- Time zone: UTC+3:30 (IRST)

Gilandeh (Persian: گيلانده, also Romanized as Gīlāndeh; also known as Khalīfābād, Khalīfehābād, and Khampārū) is aneighborhood in the city of Asalem, in Asalem District of Talesh County, Gilan Province, Iran. It is south of the city center.

It was formerly a village in Asalem Rural District. At the 2006 census, its population was 4,273, in 1,077 families. It was incorporated into Asalem city between 2006 and 2011.
