= Khaleh Saray-e Panjah va Haft =

Village in Gilan province, Iran

Khaleh Saray-e Panjah va Haft Persian: خاله سراي پنجاه وهفت
- Village
- Location within Iran
- Coordinates: 37°41′27″N 49°00′27″E
- Country: Iran
- Province: Gilan
- County: Talesh
- District: Asalem
- Rural District: Khaleh Sara

Population (2016)
  - Total: 1,274
- Time zone: UTC+3:30 (IRST)

Khaleh Saray-e Panjah va Haft (Persian: خاله سراي پنجاه وهفت) (Note: Also romanized as Khāleh Sarāy-e Panjāh va Haft; also known as Khālehsarā-ye Panjāhohaft) is a village in, and the capital of, Khaleh Sara Rural District in Asalem District of Talesh County, Gilan province, Iran.

== Demographics ==
=== Population ===
At the time of the 2006 National Census, the village's population was 1,994 in 505 households. The 2011 census counted 1,399 people in 428 households. The 2016 census measured the population of the village as 1,274 people in 430 households. It was the most populous village in its rural district.
