= Gilandeh, Mazandaran =

Gilandeh گيلان ده
- Village
- Location within Iran
- Coordinates: 36°27′21″N 52°14′58″E
- Country: Iran
- Province: Mazandaran
- County: Nur
- Bakhsh: Chamestan
- Rural District: Mianrud

Population (2006)
  - Total: 401
- Time zone: UTC+3:30 (IRST)
  - Summer (DST): UTC+4:30 (IRDT)

Gilandeh (Persian: گيلان ده, also Romanized as Gīlāndeh; also known as Galāndeh) is a village in Mianrud Rural District, Chamestan District, Nur County, Mazandaran Province, Iran. At the 2006 census, its population was 401, in 95 families.
