= Asalem =

City in Gilan province, Iran

Asalem Persian: اسالم
- City
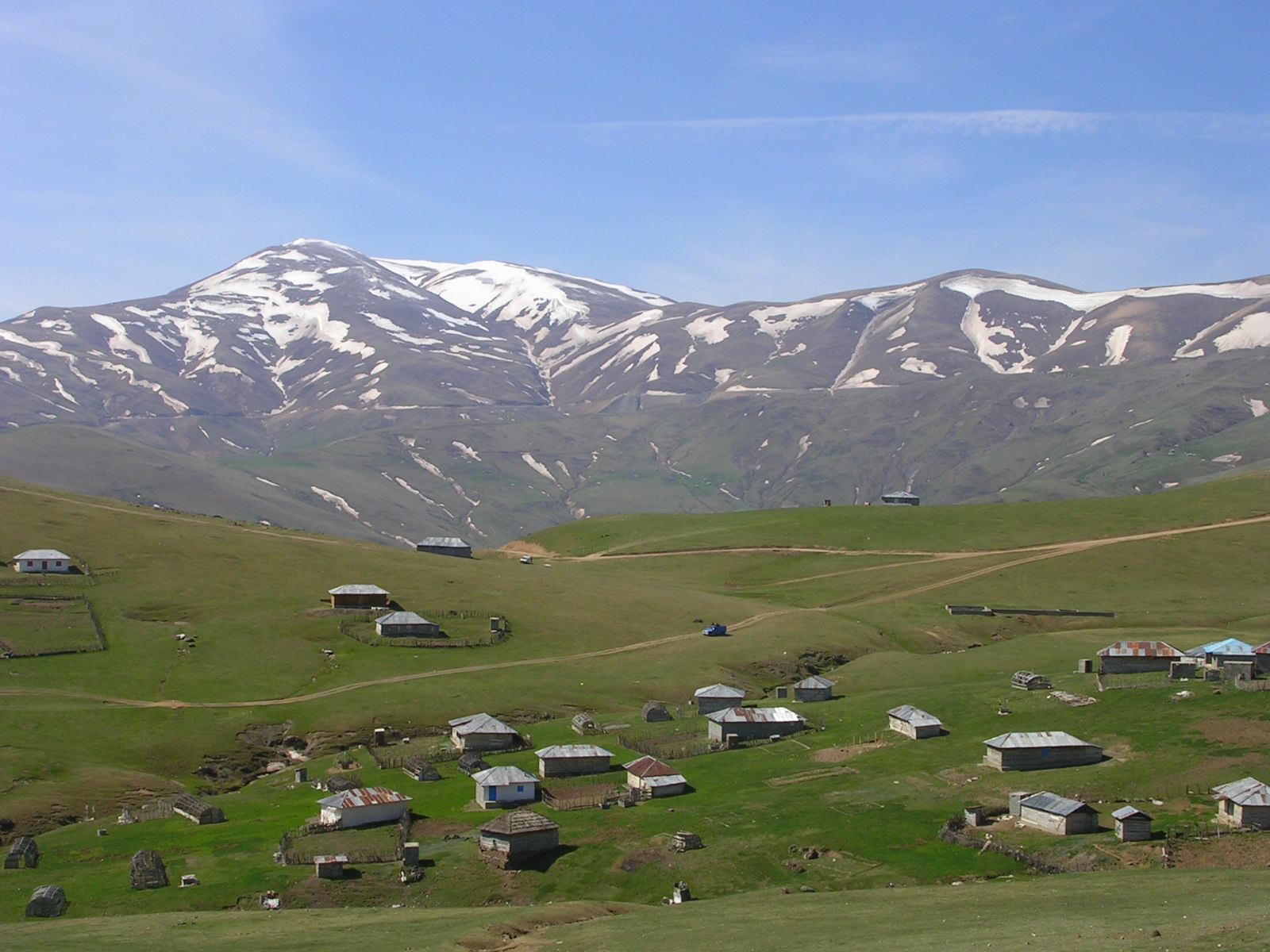

- Location within Iran
- Coordinates: 37°43′16″N 48°57′30″E
- Country: Iran
- Province: Gilan
- County: Talesh
- District: Asalem
- Established as a city: 2000

Population (2016)
  - Total: 10,720
- Time zone: UTC+3:30 (IRST)

Asalem (Persian: اسالم) (Note: Also romanized as Asālem) is a city in, and the capital of, Asalem District in Talesh County, Gilan province, in northwestern Iran. The city also serves as the administrative center for Asalem Rural District. The village of Asalem was converted to a city in 2000.

== Demographics ==
=== Language ===
The Asalemi dialect is a variety of Talysh Linguistic composition of the city.

Asalem linguistic composition
language	percent
Talysh	65%
New Persian	30%
Gilaki	5%

=== Population ===
At the time of the 2006 National Census, the city's population was 3,347 in 827 households. The following census in 2011 counted 10,040 people in 2,809 households by which time the villages of Nav-e Pain and Khalifabad were incorporated into the urban area. The 2016 census measured the population of the city as 10,720 people in 3,271 households.
