= Ali Sara, Fuman =

Ali Sara عليسرا
- Village
- Location within Iran
- Coordinates: 37°11′34″N 49°19′48″E
- Country: Iran
- Province: Gilan
- County: Fuman
- Bakhsh: Central
- Rural District: Gasht

Population (2006)
  - Total: 296
- Time zone: UTC+3:30 (IRST)
  - Summer (DST): UTC+4:30 (IRDT)

Ali Sara (Persian: عليسرا, also Romanized as ‘Alī Sarā; also known as ‘Alī Seh Rāh) is a village in Gasht Rural District, in the Central District of Fuman County, Gilan Province, Iran. At the 2006 census, its population was 296, in 85 families.
