= Julandeh =

Julandeh جولانده
- Village
- Location within Iran
- Coordinates: 35°06′01″N 46°31′24″E
- Country: Iran
- Province: Kurdistan
- County: Sarvabad
- Bakhsh: Central
- Rural District: Zherizhah

Population (2006)
  - Total: 179
- Time zone: UTC+3:30 (IRST)
  - Summer (DST): UTC+4:30 (IRDT)

Julandeh (Persian: جولانده, also Romanized as Jūlāndeh and Jowlān Deh; also known as Ghūlan Deh and Gīlān Deh) is a village in Zherizhah Rural District, in the Central District of Sarvabad County, Kurdistan Province, Iran. At the 2006 census, its population was 179, in 43 families. The village is populated by Kurds.
