= Siah Chal, Lorestan =

Siah Chal سياه چل
- Village
- Location within Iran
- Coordinates: 33°37′35″N 48°32′56″E
- Country: Iran
- Province: Lorestan
- County: Khorramabad
- Bakhsh: Bayravand
- Rural District: Beyranvand-e Jonubi

Population (2006)
  - Total: 72
- Time zone: UTC+3:30 (IRST)
  - Summer (DST): UTC+4:30 (IRDT)

Siah Chal (Persian: سياه چل, also Romanized as Sīāh Chal, Sīāh Chol, and Sīāchal; also known as Sevāh Chal) is a village in Beyranvand-e Jonubi Rural District, Bayravand District, Khorramabad County, Lorestan Province, Iran. At the 2006 census, its population was 72, in 18 families.
