= Khaleh Sara Rural District =

Rural district in Gilan province, Iran

Khaleh Sara Rural District Persian: دهستان خاله سرا
- Rural District
- Location within Iran
- Coordinates: 37°40′N 49°00′E
- Country: Iran
- Province: Gilan
- County: Talesh
- District: Asalem
- Established: 1997
- Capital: Khaleh Saray-e Panjah va Haft

Population (2016)
  - Total: 7,702
- Time zone: UTC+3:30 (IRST)

Khaleh Sara Rural District (Persian: دهستان خاله سرا) is in Asalem District of Talesh County, Gilan province, Iran. Its capital is the village of Khaleh Saray-e Panjah va Haft.

== Demographics ==
=== Population ===
At the time of the 2006 National Census, the rural district's population was 6,930 in 1,691 households. There were 7,495 inhabitants in 2,307 households at the following census of 2011. The 2016 census measured the population of the rural district as 7,702 in 2,493 households. The most populous of its 17 villages was Khaleh Saray-e Panjah va Haft, with 1,274 people.

=== Other villages in the rural district ===
- Allah Deh
- Digeh Sara
- Gotag Sara
- Miandeh
- Molla Mahalleh
- Pir-e Harat
- Siah Bil
