= Kharajgil Rural District =

Rural district in Gilan province, Iran

Kharajgil Rural District Persian: دهستان خرجگيل
- Rural District
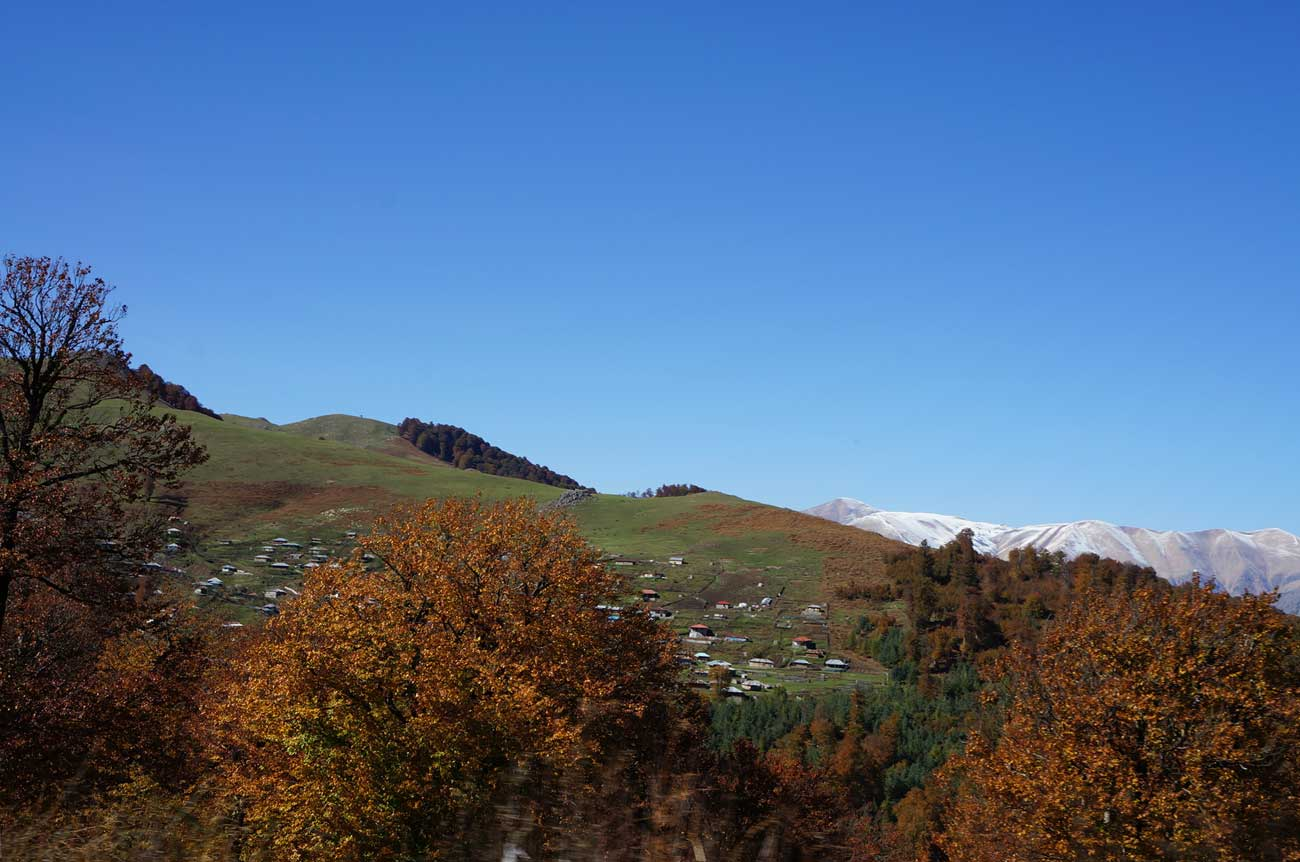
- The Asalem–Khalkhal Road in Kharajgil Rural District

- Location within Iran
- Coordinates: 37°39′N 48°47′E
- Country: Iran
- Province: Gilan
- County: Talesh
- District: Asalem
- Established: 1997
- Capital: Kharajgil

Population (2016)
  - Total: 7,355
- Time zone: UTC+3:30 (IRST)

Kharajgil Rural District (Persian: دهستان خرجگيل) is in Asalem District of Talesh County, Gilan province, in northwestern Iran. Its capital is the village of Kharajgil.

== Demographics ==
=== Population ===
At the time of the 2006 National Census, the rural district's population was 8,586 in 1,920 households. There were 6,917 inhabitants in 1,949 households at the 2011 census. The 2016 census measured the population of the rural district as 7,355 in 2,168 households. The most populous of its 38 villages was Kharajgil, with 2,801 people.

=== Other villages in the rural district ===
- Deraz Mahalleh
- Gijow
- Gilandeh
- Keshavar
- Lakateshem
- Lavabon
- Yari Mahalleh
