= Asalem Rural District =

Rural district in Gilan province, Iran

Asalem Rural District Persian: دهستان اسالم
- Rural District
- Location within Iran
- Coordinates: 37°44′N 48°58′E
- Country: Iran
- Province: Gilan
- County: Talesh
- District: Asalem
- Established: 1987
- Capital: Asalem

Population (2016)
  - Total: 16,442
- Time zone: UTC+3:30 (IRST)

Asalem Rural District (Persian: دهستان اسالم) is in Asalem District of Talesh County, Gilan province, in northwestern Iran. It is administered from the city of Asalem.

== Demographics ==
=== Population ===
At the time of the 2006 National Census, the rural district's population was 20,226 in 4,765 households. There were 16,117 inhabitants in 4,638 households at the following census of 2011. The 2016 census measured the population of the rural district as 16,442 in 5,146 households. The most populous of its 29 villages was Bala Deh, with 2,360 people.

=== Other villages in the rural district ===
- Chekhreh Mahalleh
- Kalah Sara
- Karband
- Khaneqah Bala va Pain
- Lamir-e Sofla
- Narenj Dul
- Owleh Kari-ye Asalem
- Sheykh Sara
- Siah Chal
- Vardeh Sara
