= Asalem District =

District in Gilan province, Iran

Asalem District Persian: بخش اسالم
- District
- Location within Iran
- Coordinates: 37°40′N 48°50′E
- Country: Iran
- Province: Gilan
- County: Talesh
- Established: 1997
- Capital: Asalem

Population (2016)
  - Total: 42,219
- Time zone: UTC+3:30 (IRST)

Asalem District (Persian: بخش اسالم) is in Talesh County, Gilan province, in northwestern Iran. Its capital is the city of Asalem.

== Demographics ==
=== Population ===
At the time of the 2006 National Census, the district's population was 39,089 in 9,203 households. The following census in 2011 counted 40,569 people in 11,703 households. The 2016 census measured the population of the district as 42,219 inhabitants in 13,078 households.

=== Administrative divisions ===
Asalem District Population
Administrative Divisions	2006	2011	2016
Asalem RD	20,226	16,117	16,442
Khaleh Sara RD	6,930	7,495	7,702
Kharajgil RD	8,586	6,917	7,355
Asalem (city)	3,347	10,040	10,720
Total	39,089	40,569	42,219
RD = Rural District
