= Anarestan =

Anarestan or Anarstan (Persian: انارستان), also rendered as Anaristan, may refer to:

- Anarestan, Dashtestan, Bushehr Province
- Anarestan, Jam, Bushehr Province
- Anarestan, Fars
- Anarestan, Gilan
- Anarestan, Kerman
- Anarestan, Lorestan
- Anarestan, Mazandaran
- Anarestan, Yazd
- Anarestan, Zanjan
- Anarestan Rural District (Fars Province)
- Anarestan Rural District (Jam County)
