= Narestan (disambiguation) =

Narestan is a village in Razavi Khorasan Province, Iran.

Narestan or Narsetan (Persian: نارستان) may also refer to:

- Narestan, Bushehr
- Narestan, Yazd
- Narsetan, Zanjan
- Narestan Rural District, in Yazd Province
