= Pazar, Iran =

Pazar پازر
- Village
- Location within Iran
- Coordinates: 32°21′36″N 53°38′30″E
- Country: Iran
- Province: Yazd
- County: Ardakan
- Bakhsh: Aqda
- Rural District: Aqda

Population (2006)
  - Total: 54
- Time zone: UTC+3:30 (IRST)
  - Summer (DST): UTC+4:30 (IRDT)

Pazar (Persian: پازر, also Romanized as Pāzar; also known as Pārz and Porzar) is a village in Aqda Rural District, Aqda District, Ardakan County, Yazd Province, Iran. At the 2006 census, its population was 54, in 21 families.
