= Sareshk, Yazd =

Sareshk سرشك
- Village
- Country: Iran
- Province: Yazd
- County: Ardakan
- Bakhsh: Kharanaq
- Rural District: Zarrin

Population (2006)
  - Total: 13
- Time zone: UTC+3:30 (IRST)
  - Summer (DST): UTC+4:30 (IRDT)

Sareshk (Persian: سرشك) is a village in Zarrin Rural District, Kharanaq District, Ardakan County, Yazd Province, Iran. At the 2006 census, its population was 13, in 4 families.
