= Hasanabad, Kharanaq =

Hasanabad حسن اباد
- Village
- Location within Iran
- Coordinates: 32°35′15″N 54°33′53″E
- Country: Iran
- Province: Yazd
- County: Ardakan
- Bakhsh: Kharanaq
- Rural District: Zarrin

Population (2006)
  - Total: 19
- Time zone: UTC+3:30 (IRST)
  - Summer (DST): UTC+4:30 (IRDT)

Hasanabad (Persian: حسن اباد, also Romanized as Ḩasanābād; also known as Hasan Abad Bahabad) is a village in Zarrin Rural District, Kharanaq District, Ardakan County, Yazd Province, Iran. At the 2006 census, its population was 19, in 7 families.
