= Golrudbar =

Golrudbar or Gol-e Rudbar or Galrudbar or Gelrudbar or Gol Roodbar (Persian: گلرودبار), also rendered as Gil-i-Rudbar or Gul-i-Rudbar or Kolrudbar, may refer to:

- Bala Mahalleh-ye Golrudbar
- Mian Mahalleh-ye Golrudbar
- Pain Mahalleh-ye Golrudbar
