= Sarv =

Sarv (Persian: سرو) may refer to:

- Sarv, Fars
- Sarv, Hormozgan
- Sarv, South Khorasan
- Sarv, Mahabad, West Azerbaijan Province
- Sarv, Yazd
- Sarv-e Olya, Yazd Province
- Sarv-e Sofla, Yazd Province
- Sarvu, a village in Fars Province
- Serow, Iran, a city in West Azerbaijan Province

== See also ==
- SARV, an Iranian military programme
- Sarv Mittra Sikri (1908–1992), 13th Chief Justice of India
- Sarva (disambiguation)
