= Chak Chak, Yazd =

Village in Yazd province, Iran

Chak Chak چک‌چک Chāhak-e Ardakān, Pīr-e Sabz
- Village
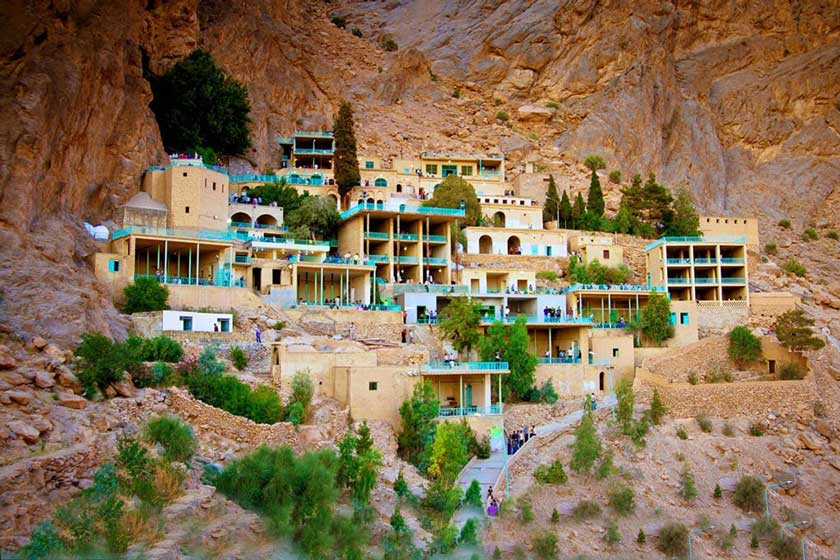
- Chak Chak in 2015

- Location within Iran
- Coordinates: 32°20′53.14″N 54°24′31.04″E
- Country: Iran
- Province: Yazd
- County: Ardakan
- Bakhsh: Kharanaq
- Rural District: Robatat
- Time zone: UTC+3:30 (IRST)
  - Summer (DST): UTC+4:30 (IRDT)

Chak Chak or Chek Chek (Persian: چک‌چک, lit. 'Drip-Drip'), also called Chāhak-e Ardakān (چاهکِ اردکان, lit. 'Well of Ardakan') or Pīr-e Sabz (پیر سبز, lit. 'The Green Pir'), is a location in the Yazd province of Iran. Located near the city of Ardakan, its existence was noted in the 2006 Iranian census.

The site consists of a "pir" (a pilgrimage site for Zoroastrians) perched beneath a towering cliff face in the desert of central Iran. It is the most sacred of the mountain shrines of Zoroastrianism, which was formerly the majority and official religion of the Iranian nation. Each year, from 14 to 18 June, thousands of Zoroastrians from Iran and India, among other countries, flock to the site's fire temple.

== In Zoroastrian tradition ==
Among some Zoroastrians, it is believed that Chak Chak is where Nikbanou, the second daughter of the Iranian king Yazdegerd III, was cornered by the Rashidun army in 640 CE, during the Arab conquest of Iran. Fearing that she would be captured, she prayed to Ahura Mazda for protection, prompting the mountain to miraculously open up and provide her with shelter.

Notable features of Chak Chak include the mountain's ever-dripping spring, which are said to be tears of grief that are shed in remembrance of Nikbanou. Growing beside the holy spring is an immense and ancient tree that is said to be Nikbanou's cane. Legend also has it that a petrified colorful cloth from Nikbanou was also visible in the rocks, although pilgrims have since removed it.

== Temple of Chak Chak ==
The actual temple of Chak Chak is a man-made grotto sheltered by two large bronze doors. The shrine enclosure is floored with marble and its walls are darkened by fires eternally burning in the sanctuary. In the cliffs below the shrine are several roofed pavilions constructed to accommodate pilgrims.

== Gallery ==
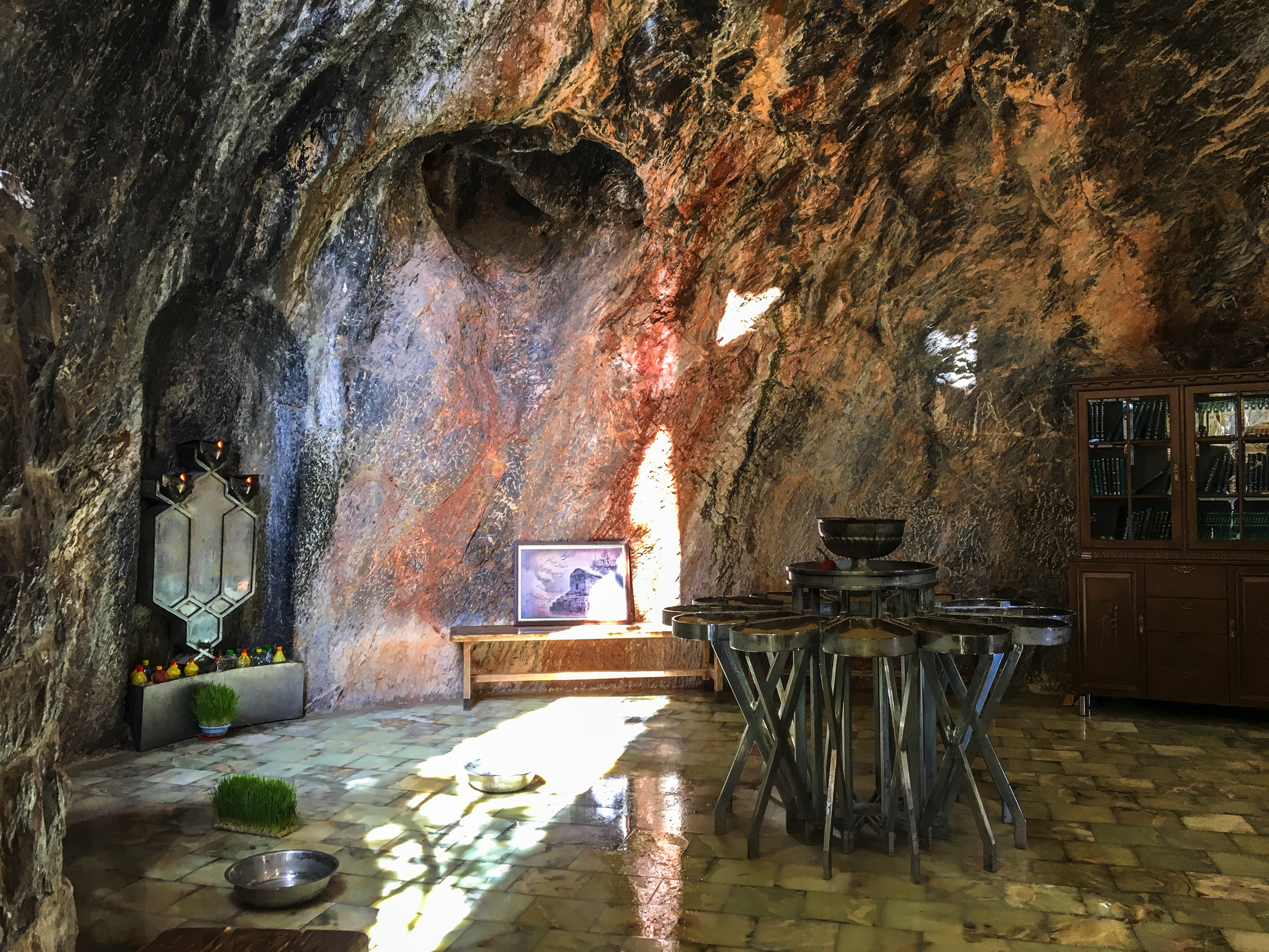
Iran - Yazd - Chak Chak

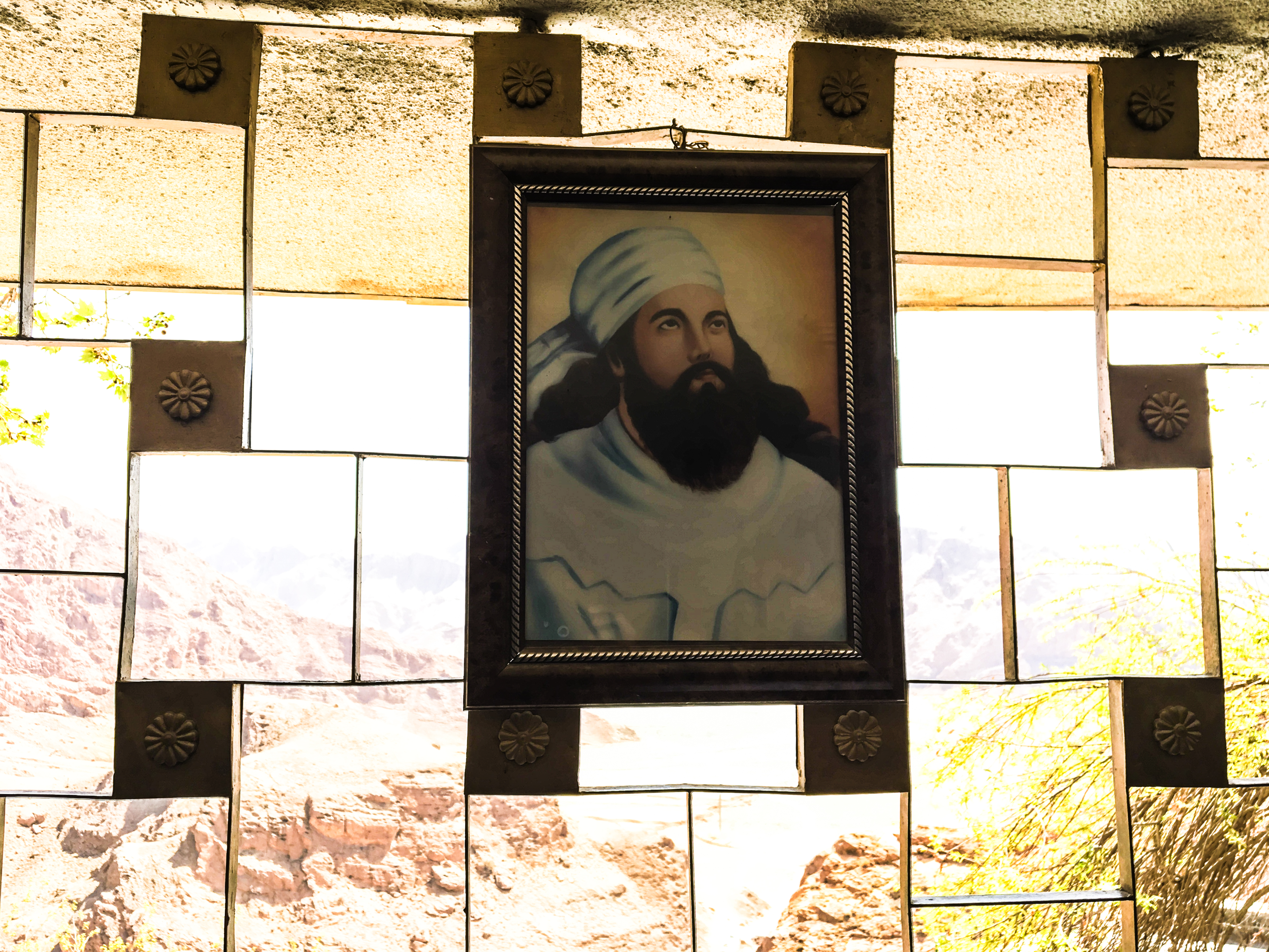
Iran - Yazd - Chak Chak

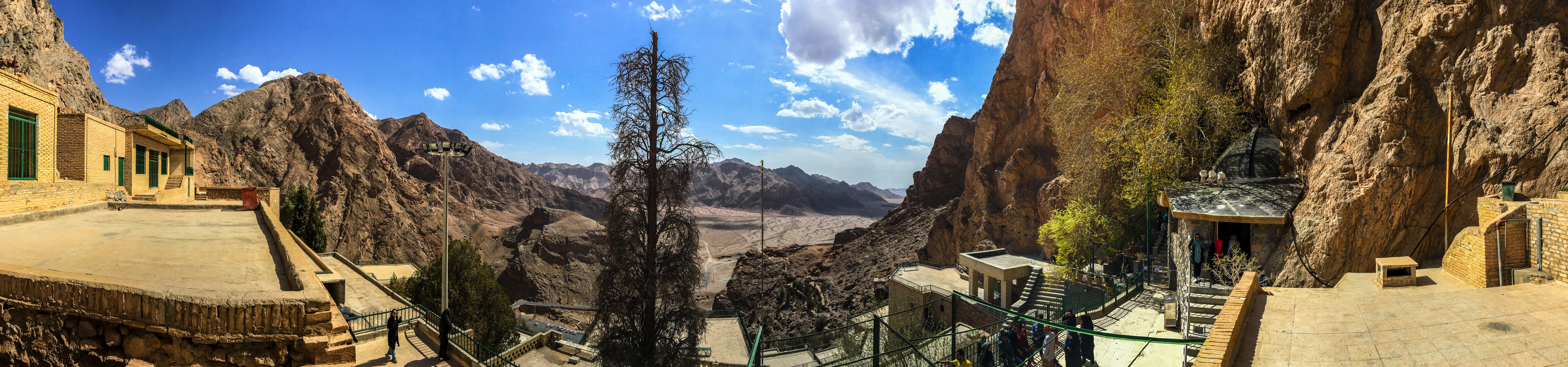
Iran - Yazd - Chak Chak

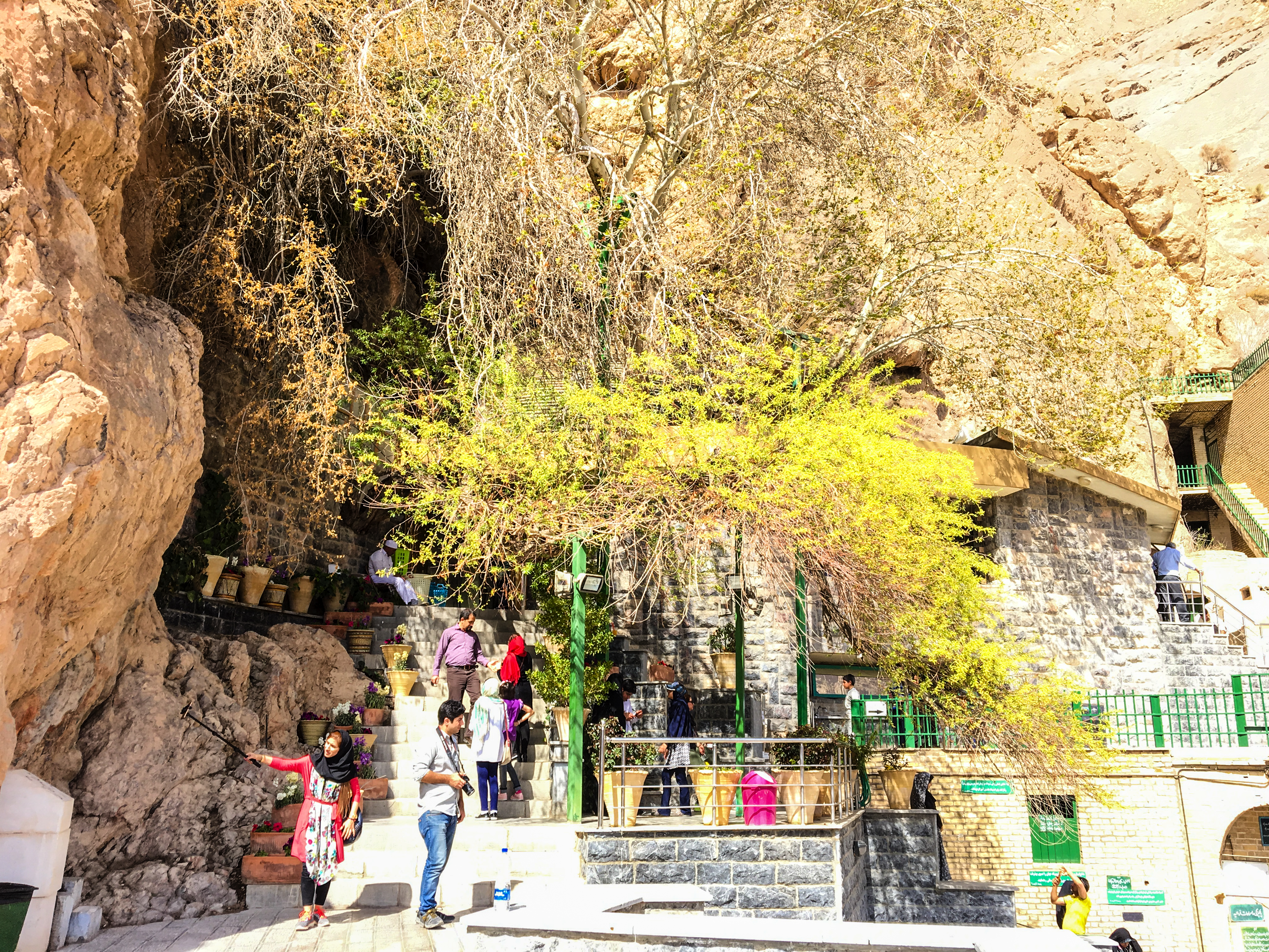
Iran - Yazd - Chak Chak

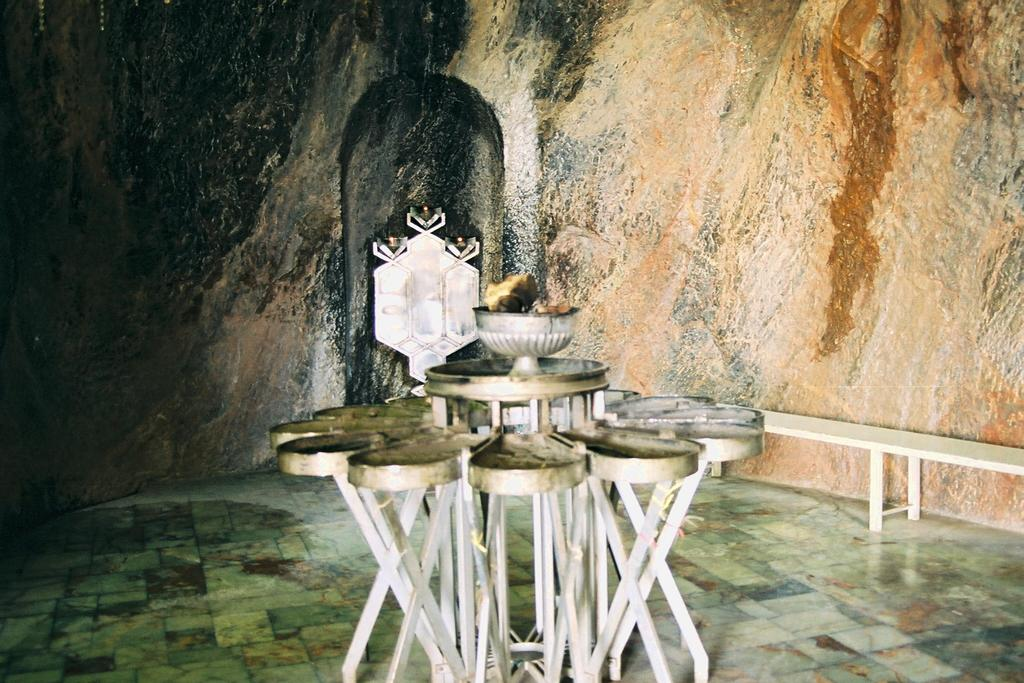
Iran - Yazd - Chak Chak

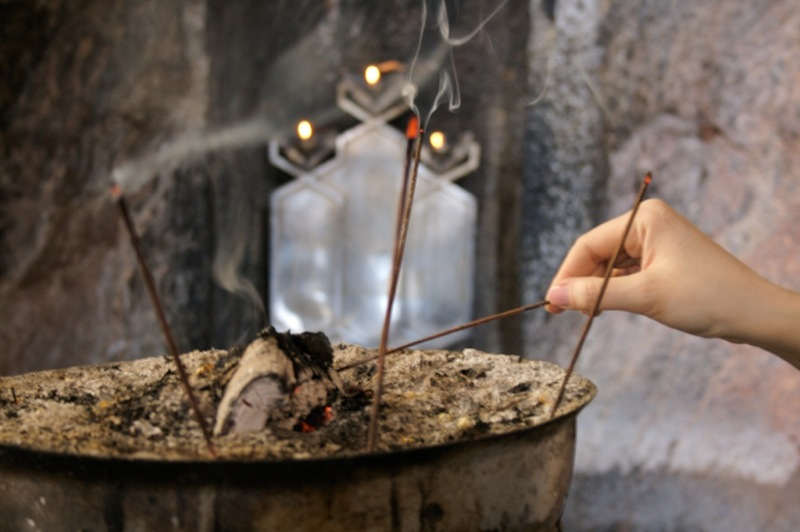
Iran - Yazd - Chak Chak

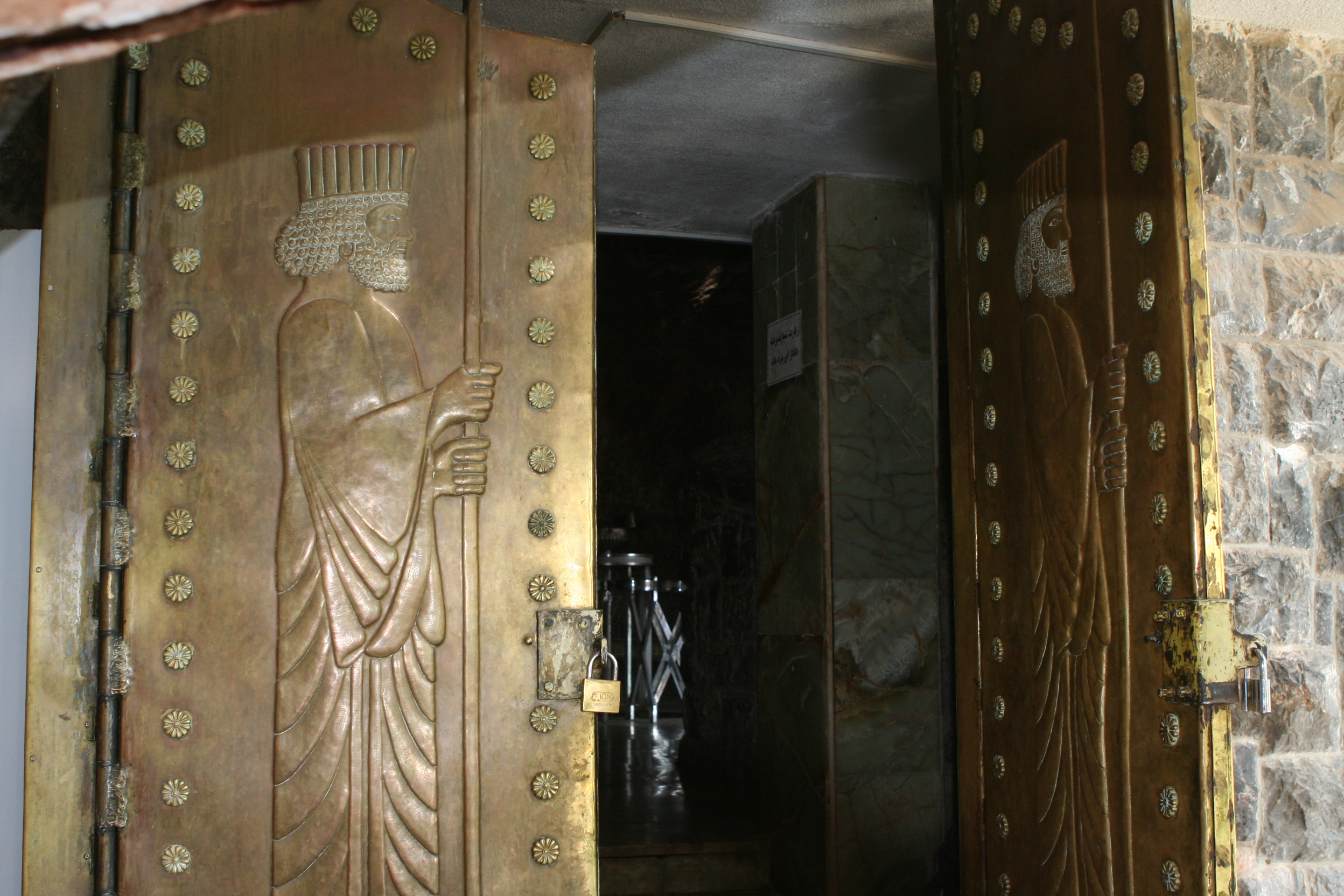
Iran - Yazd - Chak Chak

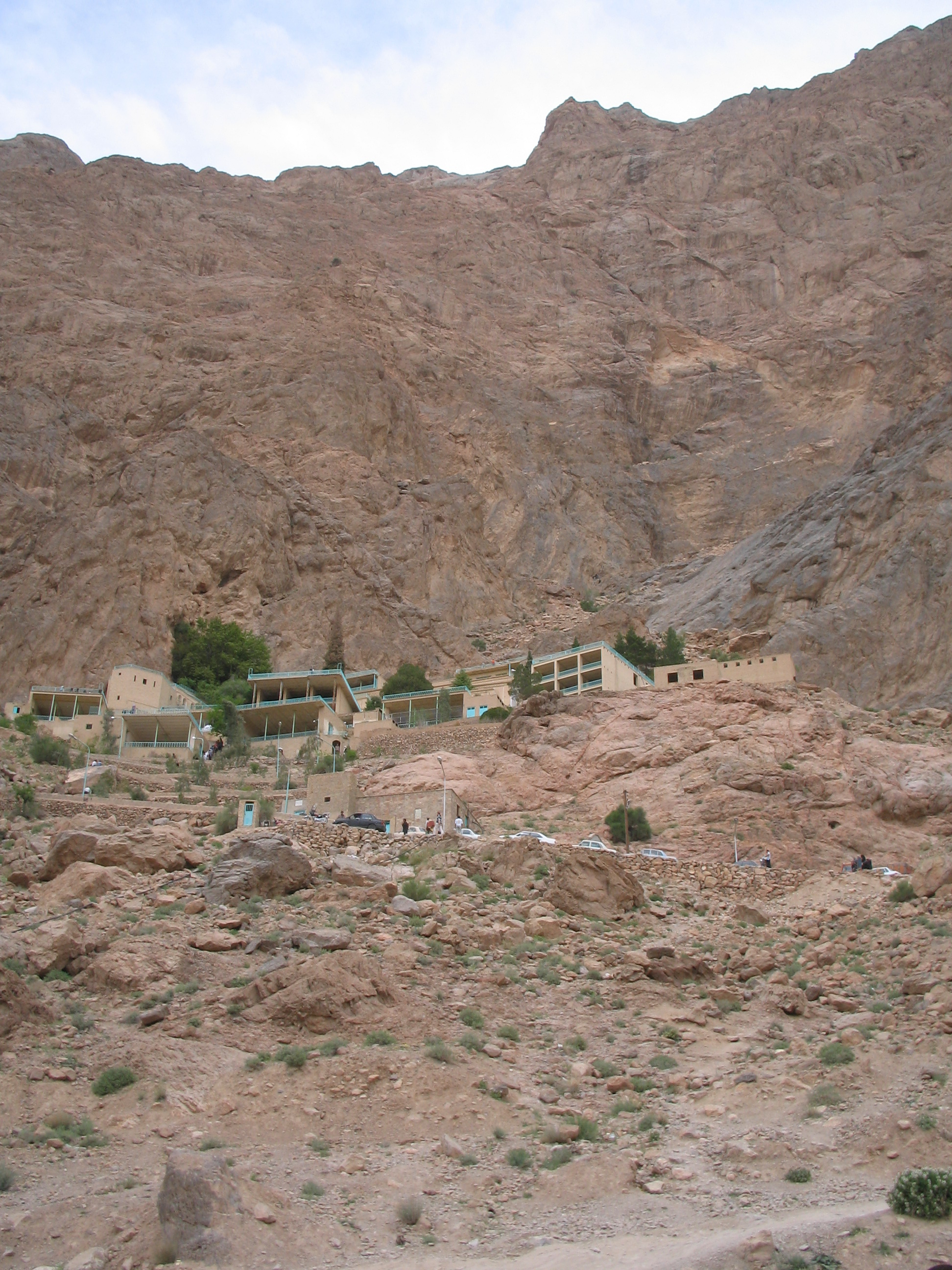
