= Chah Afzal, Yazd =

Chah Afzal چاه افضل
- Village
- Location within Iran
- Coordinates: 32°30′30″N 53°52′08″E
- Country: Iran
- Province: Yazd
- County: Ardakan
- Bakhsh: Central
- Rural District: Mohammadiyeh
- Elevation: 955 m (3,133 ft)

Population (2006)
  - Total: 274
- Time zone: UTC+3:30 (IRST)
  - Summer (DST): UTC+4:30 (IRDT)
- Area code: 742

Chah Afzal (Persian: چاه افضل, also Romanized as Chāh Afẕal) is a village in Mohammadiyeh Rural District, in the Central District of Ardakan County, Yazd Province, Iran. At the 2006 census, its population was 274, in 62 families.
