= Hasanabad-e Anaraki =

Hasanabad-e Anaraki حسن اباداناركي
- Village
- Location within Iran
- Coordinates: 32°29′12″N 53°52′56″E
- Country: Iran
- Province: Yazd
- County: Ardakan
- Bakhsh: Central
- Rural District: Mohammadiyeh

Population (2006)
  - Total: 106
- Time zone: UTC+3:30 (IRST)
  - Summer (DST): UTC+4:30 (IRDT)

Hasanabad-e Anaraki (Persian: حسن اباداناركي, also Romanized as Ḩasanābād-e Ānārakī) is a village in Mohammadiyeh Rural District, in the Central District of Ardakan County, Yazd Province, Iran. At the 2006 census, its population was 106, in 26 families.
