= Kezabcheh =

Kezabcheh كذابچه
- Village
- Location within Iran
- Coordinates: 32°22′28″N 53°35′45″E
- Country: Iran
- Province: Yazd
- County: Ardakan
- Bakhsh: Aqda
- Rural District: Aqda

Population (2006)
  - Total: 13
- Time zone: UTC+3:30 (IRST)
  - Summer (DST): UTC+4:30 (IRDT)

Kezabcheh (Persian: كذابچه, also Romanized as Kez̄ābcheh; also known as Gazīcheh, Jalālābād, Kadābcheh, Kaẕẕābcheh, and Keāzā Bcheh) is a village in Aqda Rural District, Aqda District, Ardakan County, Yazd Province, Iran. At the 2006 census, its population was 13, in 8 families.
