= Saghand =

Saghand ساغند
- Village
- Location within Iran
- Coordinates: 32°31′45″N 55°14′34″E
- Country: Iran
- Province: Yazd
- County: Ardakan
- Bakhsh: Kharanaq
- Rural District: Rabatat

Population (2006)
  - Total: 190
- Time zone: UTC+3:30 (IRST)
  - Summer (DST): UTC+4:30 (IRDT)

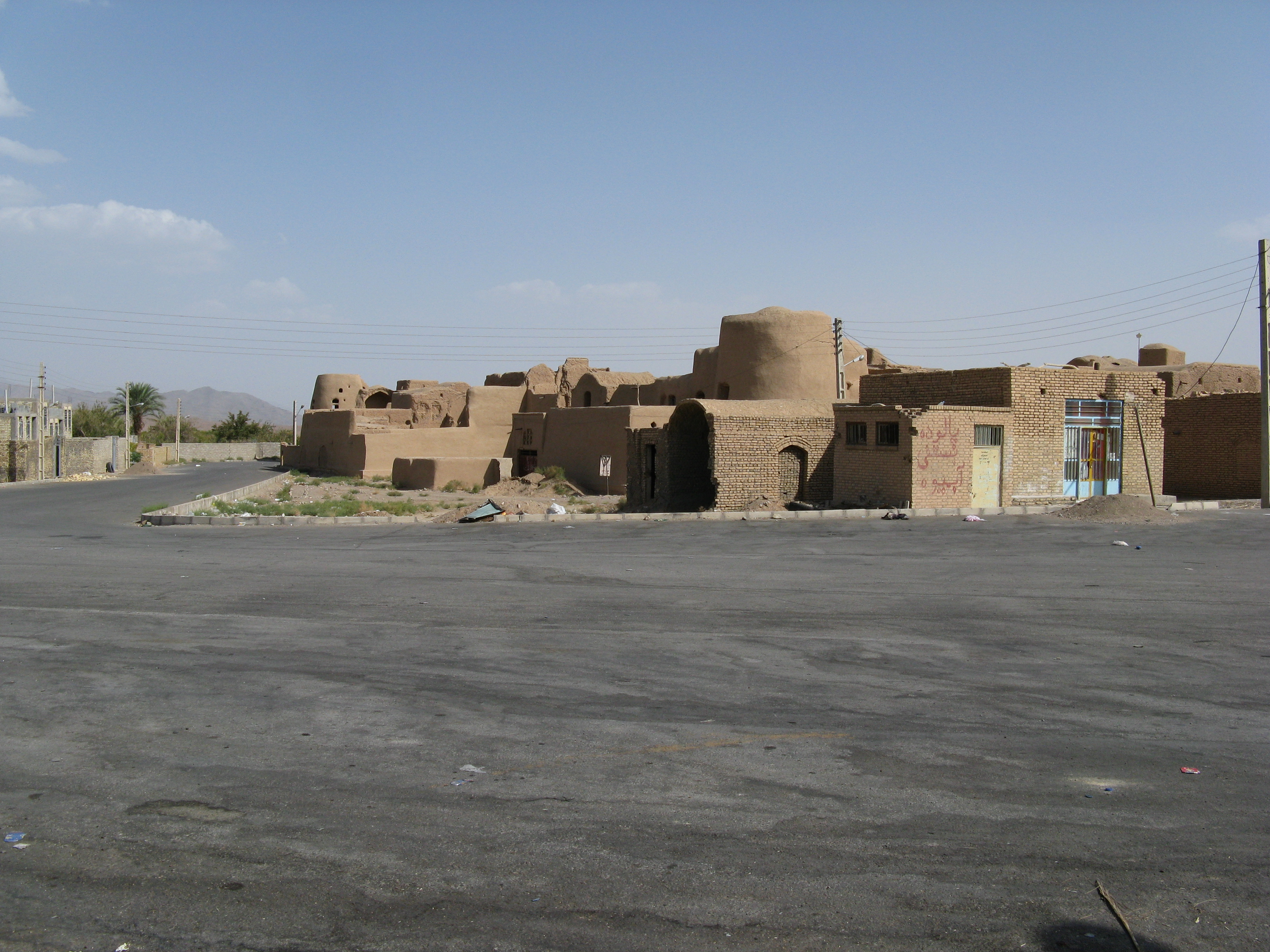
Saghand

Saghand (Persian: ساغند, also Romanized as Sāghand; also known as Sagand and Sāqand) is a village in Rabatat Rural District, Kharanaq District, Ardakan County, Yazd Province, Iran. At the 2006 census, its population was 190, in 59 families.
