= Anjiravand =

Anjiravand انجيراوند
- Village
- Location within Iran
- Coordinates: 32°30′11″N 54°27′32″E
- Country: Iran
- Province: Yazd
- County: Ardakan
- Bakhsh: Kharanaq
- Rural District: Zarrin

Population (2006)
  - Total: 118
- Time zone: UTC+3:30 (IRST)
  - Summer (DST): UTC+4:30 (IRDT)

Anjiravand (Persian: انجيراوند, also Romanized as Anjrāvand and Anjīr Āvand; also known as Anjerāvand and Mazra‘eh) is a village in Zarrin Rural District, Kharanaq District, Ardakan County, Yazd Province, Iran. At the 2006 census, its population was 118, in 42 families.
