= Shamsabad, Ardakan =

Shamsabad شمس اباد
- Village
- Location within Iran
- Coordinates: 32°26′12″N 53°39′59″E
- Country: Iran
- Province: Yazd
- County: Ardakan
- Bakhsh: Aqda
- Rural District: Aqda

Population (2006)
  - Total: 237
- Time zone: UTC+3:30 (IRST)
  - Summer (DST): UTC+4:30 (IRDT)

Shamsabad (Persian: شمس اباد, also Romanized as Shamsābād; also known as Shamsābād-e ‘Aqdā) is a village in Aqda Rural District, Aqda District, Ardakan County, Yazd province, Iran. At the 2006 census, its population was 237, in 71 families.
