= Dowgun =

Dowgun دوگان
- Village
- Location within Iran
- Coordinates: 32°21′20″N 53°38′19″E
- Country: Iran
- Province: Yazd
- County: Ardakan
- Bakhsh: Aqda
- Rural District: Aqda

Population (2006)
  - Total: 11
- Time zone: UTC+3:30 (IRST)
  - Summer (DST): UTC+4:30 (IRDT)

Dowgun (Persian: دوگان, also Romanized as Dowgūn, Doogan, and Dūgan; also known as Dārgān, Dehgān, and Dehkhān) is a village in Aqda Rural District, Aqda District, Ardakan County, Yazd Province, Iran. At the 2006 census, its population was 11, in 5 families.
