= Sarchah-e Varaun =

Sarchah-e Varaun سرچاه وراعون
- Village
- Location within Iran
- Coordinates: 32°17′53″N 53°38′05″E
- Country: Iran
- Province: Yazd
- County: Ardakan
- Bakhsh: Aqda
- Rural District: Aqda

Population (2006)
  - Total: 23
- Time zone: UTC+3:30 (IRST)
  - Summer (DST): UTC+4:30 (IRDT)

Sarchah-e Varaun (Persian: سرچاه وراعون, also Romanized as Sarchāh-e Varā‘ūn; also known as Chāh-e Varā‘ūn, Varārān, Varā‘ūn, and Vār‘ūn) is a village in Aqda Rural District, Aqda District, Ardakan County, Yazd Province, Iran. At the 2006 census, its population was 23, in 8 families.
