= Gazestan, Kharanaq =

Gazestan گزستان
- Village
- Location within Iran
- Coordinates: 32°30′36″N 54°31′48″E
- Country: Iran
- Province: Yazd
- County: Ardakan
- Bakhsh: Kharanaq
- Rural District: Zarrin

Population (2006)
  - Total: 17
- Time zone: UTC+3:30 (IRST)
  - Summer (DST): UTC+4:30 (IRDT)

Gazestan (Persian: گزستان, also Romanized as Gazestān) is a village in Zarrin Rural District, Kharanaq District, Ardakan County, Yazd Province, Iran. At the 2006 census, its population was 17, in 9 families.
