= Hasanabad, Aqda =

Village in Yazd province, Iran

Hasanabad Persian: حسن اباد
- Village
- Country: Iran
- Province: Yazd
- County: Ardakan
- District: Aqda
- Rural District: Narestan

Population (2016)
  - Total: 935
- Time zone: UTC+3:30 (IRST)

Hasanabad (Persian: حسن اباد) (Note: Also romanized as Ḩasanābād) is a village in, and the capital of, Narestan Rural District of Aqda District of Ardakan County, Yazd province, Iran.

== Demographics ==
=== Population ===
At the time of the 2006 National Census, the village's population was 774 in 241 households. The following census in 2011 counted 870 people in 300 households. The 2016 census measured the population of the village as 935 people in 330 households. It was the most populous village in its rural district.
