= Khalu Bagh =

Khalu Bagh خالوباغ
- Neighborhood
- Location within Iran
- Coordinates: 37°12′29″N 49°59′13″E
- Country: Iran
- Province: Gilan
- County: Lahijan
- Bakhsh: Central
- City: Lahijan

Population (2006)
  - Total: 1,057
- Time zone: UTC+3:30 (IRST)

Khalu Bagh (Persian: خالوباغ, also Romanized as Khālū Bāgh) is a neighborhood in the western part of Lahijan city in Gilan Province, Iran.

a village in Baz Kia Gurab Rural District, in the Central District of Lahijan County. At the 2006 census, its population was 1,057, in 300 families.

Khalu Bagh is near the city's western limits, with Malbijar village to its west.
