= Zarju =

Zarju زرجوع
- Village
- Location within Iran
- Coordinates: 32°20′00″N 53°36′04″E
- Country: Iran
- Province: Yazd
- County: Ardakan
- Bakhsh: Aqda
- Rural District: Aqda

Population (2006)
  - Total: 69
- Time zone: UTC+3:30 (IRST)
  - Summer (DST): UTC+4:30 (IRDT)

Zarju (Persian: زرجوع, also Romanized as Zarjū‘; also known as Zarjūh and Zarkhū‘) is a village in Aqda Rural District, Aqda District, Ardakan County, Yazd Province, Iran. At the 2006 census, its population was 69, in 23 families.
