= Torkabad, Yazd =

Village in Yazd province, Iran

Torkabad Persian: ترك اباد
- Village
- Location within Iran
- Coordinates: 32°20′33″N 53°58′07″E
- Country: Iran
- Province: Yazd
- County: Ardakan
- District: Central
- Rural District: Mohammadiyeh

Population (2016)
  - Total: 3,714
- Time zone: UTC+3:30 (IRST)

Torkabad (Persian: ترك اباد) (Note: Also romanized as Tarkābād and Torkābād; also known as Turkābād) is a village in Mohammadiyeh Rural District of the Central District of Ardakan County, Yazd province, Iran.

== Demographics ==
=== Population ===
At the time of the 2006 National Census, the village's population wa 2,656 in 686 households. The following census in 2011 counted 3,194 people in 947 households. The 2016 census measured the population of the village as 3,714 people in 1,138 households. It was the most populous village in its rural district.
