= Hajjiabad-e Zarrin =

Village in Yazd province, Iran

Hajjiabad-e Zarrin Persian: حاجي اباد زرين
- Village
- Location within Iran
- Coordinates: 33°04′55″N 54°51′51″E
- Country: Iran
- Province: Yazd
- County: Ardakan
- District: Kharanaq
- Rural District: Zarrin

Population (2016)
  - Total: 178
- Time zone: UTC+3:30 (IRST)

Hajjiabad-e Zarrin (Persian: حاجي ابادزرين) (Note: Also romanized as Ḩājjīābād-e Zarrīn; also known as Hāīī Ābād-e-Zarrīn, Hājīābād, and Ḩājjīābād) is a village in Zarrin Rural District of Kharanaq District of Ardakan County, Yazd province, Iran.

== Demographics ==
=== Population ===
At the time of the 2006 National Census, the village's population was a total of 310 people in 80 households. The following census in 2011 counted 309 people in 109 households. The 2016 census measured the population of the village as 178 people in 65 households. It was the most populous village in its rural district.
