= Derend =

Derend درند
- Village
- Location within Iran
- Coordinates: 32°26′27″N 54°38′32″E
- Country: Iran
- Province: Yazd
- County: Ardakan
- Bakhsh: Kharanaq
- Rural District: Rabatat

Population (2006)
  - Total: 200
- Time zone: UTC+3:30 (IRST)
  - Summer (DST): UTC+4:30 (IRDT)

Derend (Persian: درند, also Romanized as Dorond) is a village in Rabatat Rural District, Kharanaq District, Ardakan County, Yazd Province, Iran. At the 2006 census, its population was 200, in 61 families.
