= Sarv-e Sofla =

Sarv-e Sofla سروسفلي
- Village
- Location within Iran
- Coordinates: 32°24′21″N 53°46′25″E
- Country: Iran
- Province: Yazd
- County: Ardakan
- Bakhsh: Aqda
- Rural District: Aqda

Government

Population (2006)
  - Total: 178
- Time zone: UTC+3:30 (IRST)
  - Summer (DST): UTC+4:30 (IRDT)

Sarv-e Sofla (Persian: سروسفلي, also Romanized as Sarv-e Soflá; also known as Sarv, Sarv-e Pā’īn, Sarv Pā’īn, and Sarv Sufla) is a village in Aqda Rural District, Aqda District, Ardakan County, Yazd Province, Iran. At the 2006 census, its population was 178, divided into 62 families.
