= Hamaneh, Ardakan =

Hamaneh هامانه
- Village
- Location within Iran
- Coordinates: 32°22′45″N 54°34′50″E
- Country: Iran
- Province: Yazd
- County: Ardakan
- Bakhsh: Kharanaq
- Rural District: Rabatat

Population (2006)
  - Total: 187
- Time zone: UTC+3:30 (IRST)
  - Summer (DST): UTC+4:30 (IRDT)

Hamaneh (Persian: هامانه, also Romanized as Hāmāneh; also known as Hamane Robatat, Homān, and Human) is a village in Rabatat Rural District, Kharanaq District, Ardakan County, Yazd Province, Iran. At the 2006 census, its population was 187, in 69 families.
