= Khargushi, Yazd =

Khargushi خرگوشي
- Village
- Country: Iran
- Province: Yazd
- County: Ardakan
- Bakhsh: Aqda
- Rural District: Narestan

Population (2006)
  - Total: 20
- Time zone: UTC+3:30 (IRST)

Khargushi (Persian: خرگوشي, also Romanized as Khargūshī) is a village in Narestan Rural District, Aqda District, Ardakan County, Yazd Province, Iran. At the 2006 census, its population was 20, in 5 families.
