= Robat-e Posht-e Badam =

Village in Yazd province, Iran

Robat-e Posht-e Badam Persian: رباط پشت بادام
- Village
- Location within Iran
- Coordinates: 33°00′52″N 55°33′53″E
- Country: Iran
- Province: Yazd
- County: Ardakan
- District: Kharanaq
- Rural District: Rabotat

Population (2016)
  - Total: 770
- Time zone: UTC+3:30 (IRST)

Robat-e Posht-e Badam (Persian: رباطپشت بادام) (Note: Also romanized as Robāt-e-Posht Bādām and Robāţ-e Posht-e Bādām; also known as Posht-e Bādām, Posht-e Bādom, Pusht-i-Bādām, Ribāt-i-Pusht-i-Bādām, and Robāţ-e Khalaf-e Bādām) is a village in Robatat Rural District of Kharanaq District of Ardakan County, Yazd province, Iran.

== Demographics ==
=== Population ===
At the time of the 2006 National Census, the village's population was 761 in 206 households. The following census in 2011 counted 686 people in 226 households. The 2016 census measured the population of the village as 770 people in 263 households. It was the most populous village in its rural district.
