= Keykuh, Yazd =

Keykuh كي كوه
- Village
- Location within Iran
- Coordinates: 32°22′48″N 53°31′14″E
- Country: Iran
- Province: Yazd
- County: Ardakan
- Bakhsh: Aqda
- Rural District: Narestan

Population (2006)
  - Total: 51
- Time zone: UTC+3:30 (IRST)
  - Summer (DST): UTC+4:30 (IRDT)

Keykuh (Persian: كي كوه, also Romanized as Keykūh; also known as Kadkūh) is a village in Narestan Rural District, Aqda District, Ardakan County, Yazd Province, Iran. At the 2006 census, its population was 51, in 16 families.
