= Tut, Yazd =

Village in Yazd province, Iran

Tut Persian: توت
- Village
- Location within Iran
- Coordinates: 32°32′21″N 54°25′12″E
- Country: Iran
- Province: Yazd
- County: Ardakan
- District: Kharanaq
- Rural District: Zarrin

Population (2016)
  - Total: 62
- Time zone: UTC+3:30 (IRST)

Tut (Persian: توت) (Note: Also romanized as Tūt; also known as ‘Abbāsīyeh) is a village in, and the capital of, Zarrin Rural District of Kharanaq District of Ardakan County, Yazd province, Iran.

== Demographics ==
=== Population ===
At the time of the 2006 National Census, the village's population was 195 in 77 households. The following census in 2011 counted 66 people in 31 households. The 2016 census measured the population of the village as 62 people in 21 households.
