= Dorond =

Dorond (Persian: درند) may refer to:

- Dorond, Ardakan
- Dorond, Behabad
