= Zir Deh Mosque =

Mosque in Ardakan, Yazd, Iran

- Persian: مسجد زیرده
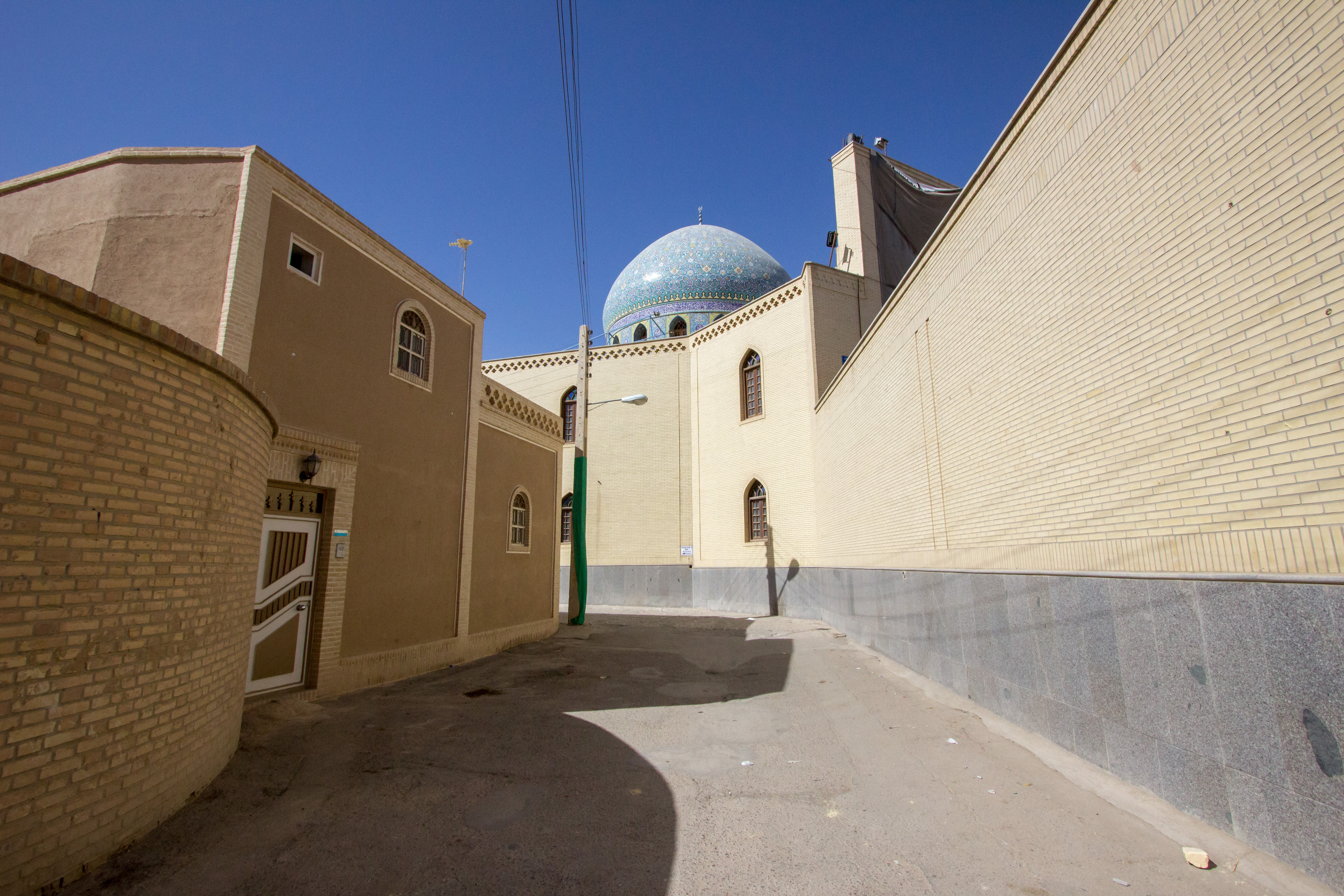
- The mosque dome in 2017

- Location of the mosque in Iran

Religion
- Affiliation: Shia Islam
- Ecclesiastical or organizational status: Mosque
- Status: Active

Location
- Location: Ardakan, Yazd Province
- Country: Iran
- Interactive map of Zir Deh Mosque
- Coordinates: 32°19′14″N 54°01′12″E

Architecture
- Type: Mosque architecture
- Style: Safavid; Qajar
- Completed: 1581 CE

Specifications
- Dome: One
- Materials: Adobe; plaster

Iran National Heritage List
- Official name: Zir Deh Mosque
- Type: Built
- Designated: 18 April 1978
- Reference no.: 1627
- Conservation organization: Cultural Heritage, Handicrafts and Tourism Organization of Iran

The Zir Deh Mosque (Persian: مسجد زیرده; Arabic: جامع زيردة) is a Shia mosque located in Ardakan, in the Yazd Province of Iran. The mosque was completed in 1581 CE, during the Safavid era, with additions completed in 1803, during the Qajar era.

The mosque was added to the Iran National Heritage List on 18 April 1978, administered by the Cultural Heritage, Handicrafts and Tourism Organization of Iran.

== See also ==
- Shia Islam in Iran
- List of mosques in Iran
