= Golestan, Bushehr =

Neighborhood in Bushehr province, Iran

Golestan Persian: گلستان
- Neighborhood
- Location within Iran
- Coordinates: 28°02′08″N 52°04′24″E
- Country: Iran
- Province: Bushehr
- County: Jam
- District: Riz
- City: Anarestan

Population (2006)
  - Total: 316
- Time zone: UTC+3:30 (IRST)

Golestan (Persian: گلستان) (Note: Also romanized as Golestān; also known as Ghargī and Khargī) is a neighborhood in the city of Anarestan in Riz District of Jam County, Bushehr province, Iran.

== Demographics ==
=== Population ===
At the time of the 2006 National Census, Golestan's population was 316 in 63 households, when it was a village in Anarestan Rural District.

The village of Anarestan merged with Golestan and was converted to a city in 2009.
