= Kharanaq =

Village in Yazd province, Iran

Kharanaq Persian: خرانق
- Village
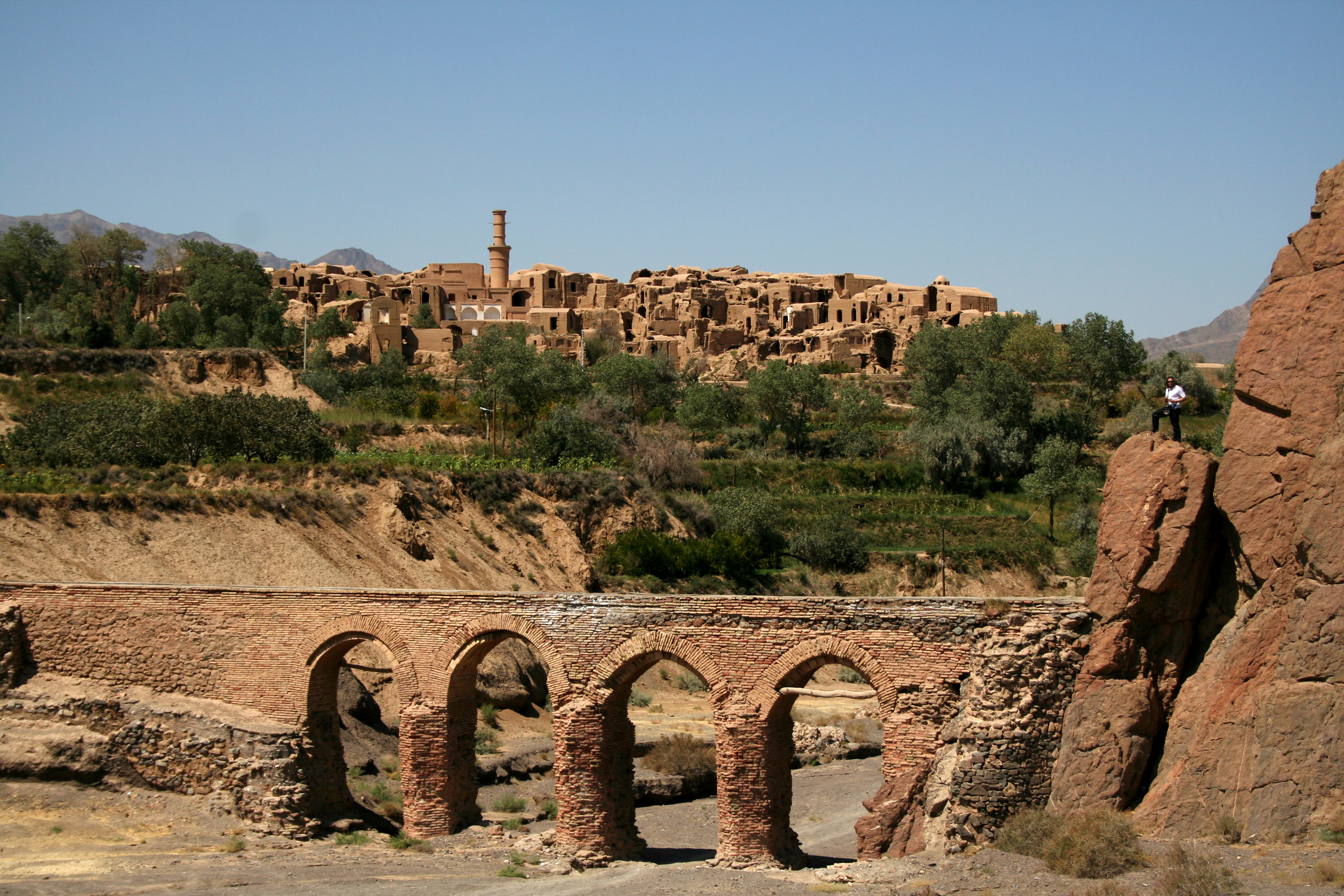

- Location within Iran
- Coordinates: 32°20′42″N 54°39′56″E
- Country: Iran
- Province: Yazd
- County: Ardakan
- District: Kharanaq
- Rural District: Robatat

Population (2016)
  - Total: 437
- Time zone: UTC+3:30 (IRST)

Kharanaq (Persian: خرانق) (Note: Also romanized as Kharānaq, Kharāneq, and Kharānoq; also known as Kharanagh, Khowrāneq, and Khurūnaq (English: Land of Sun)) is a village in Robatat Rural District of Kharanaq District, Ardakan County, Yazd province, serving as capital of both the district and the rural district. Kharanaq is 70 km north of the city of Yazd.

== History ==
Kharanaq means "birthplace of the sun" and has been continuously inhabited for 4,500 years. It is divided into two parts; the Old Town, with its collection of mud brick buildings and a caravanserai, and the New Town, where more than 400 people continue to live. Kharanaq was prosperous in farming, but with the water supply drying up, the inhabitants left, leaving the old town in ruin.

== Demographics ==
=== Population ===
At the time of the 2006 National Census, the village's population was 433 in 133 households. The following census in 2011 counted 251 people in 80 households. The 2016 census measured the population of the village as 437 people in 125 households.

== Historical monuments ==
The town and its minaret have become a minor tourist attraction. Kharanaq, which was known as a world and historical village, was introduced as the 23rd city of Yazd province on 6 July 2020. This 4500-year-old city is surrounded by mountains on one side and the desert from the other. Many buildings in Kharanaq/ Kharanagh are completely collapsed and ramshackle, but among them, the remaining mosque from the Qajar era, a shaking minaret from the Seljuk era and the caravanserai of the city have been reconstructed and can be visited.

=== Castle of Kharanaq ===
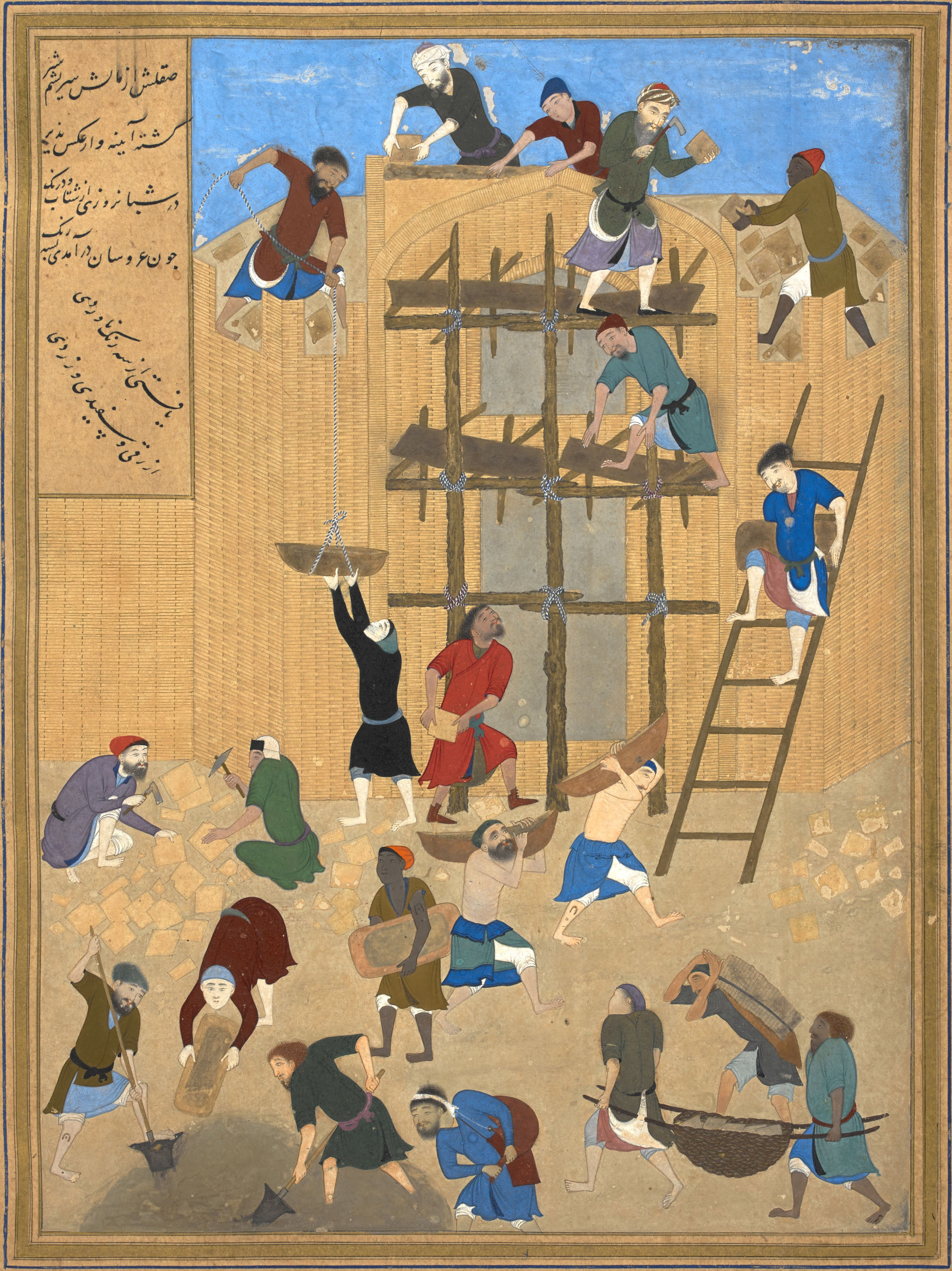
Construction of the fort of Kharnaq (Kamāl ud-Dīn Behzād, c. 1495)

The Sasanian era castle is the main attraction of the village and dates back to around 1800 years ago. Kharanaq Castle is one of the first castles in the world with two- and three-story houses. It contains 80 houses, watchtowers and is surrounded by a tall wall.

It has exhibition rooms made of clay and mud, inside the castle was designed like a maze to create confusion for thieves and attackers, who entering the building.

=== Bridge of Kharanaq ===
Among all the villages in Yazd, Kharanaq is the only village that has a bridge. However, many myths and stories surround this bridge as it has never been a passage for animals or livestock. It is believed that the bridge only exists to transfer water from the seasonal river to the farms, or act as a dam. The bridge is 40 meters long and it was designed to prevent water shortage in the village.

=== Shaking Minaret ===
This magnificent building is one of the three moving minarets in Iran and was designed in the Seljuk era, it is a part of the nationally registered works of Iran. The minaret is designed and constructed in a special way so it can move. It is built in a way that one can shake it by giving a gentle push on its upper part. The minaret has three floors, which are interconnected through spiral stairs. For climbing or going down the stairs, there are two separate corridors. The width of the spiral staircase is 70 cm at the bottom and gradually narrows to a final width of 40 cm at the top. it is made completely out of clay, which make it to be the only minaret in the world made of this material.

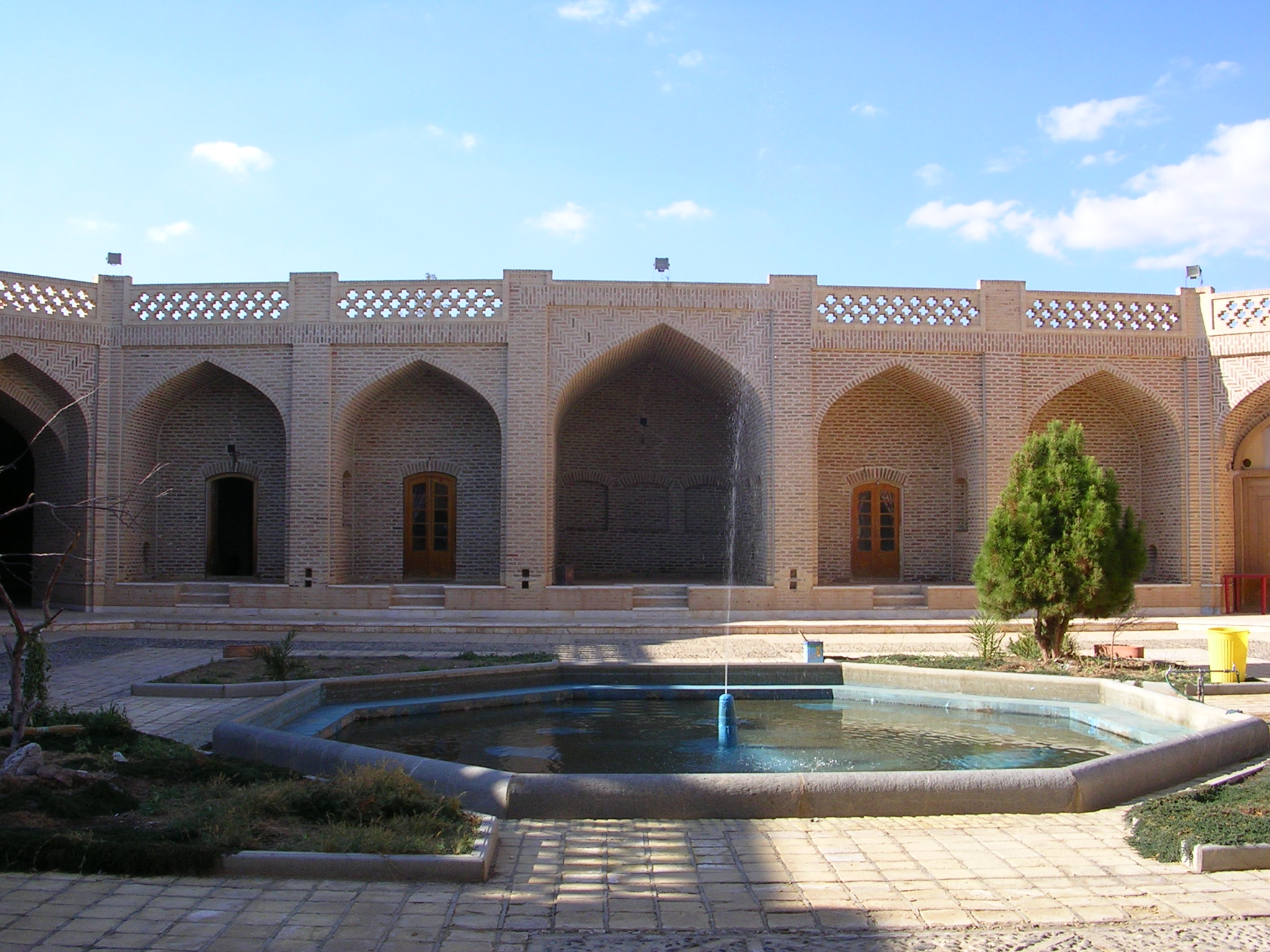
Kharanaq caravanserai

=== Kharanaq caravanserai ===
The caravanserai dates to the Sasanian era. Later it was rebuilt and reconstructed under the command of Muhammad Vali Mirza, the son of Fath-Ali Shah Qajar. The large number of rooms and arcs in this caravanserai prove that Kharanaq was a busy place where many travelers used to stay. It has a yard in the center and it is surrounded by rooms. Today, tourists can reserve the rooms and spend the nights at Kharanaq Village Caravanserai.

=== Kharanaq bath ===
The bathhouse was constructed during the Qajar era. One of its key features is the principled design of the water and sewage inlet and outlet system for optimal use of water resources. The bath is built in such a way that the water of the Qanats (subterranean canals) are easily directed into it.

=== Kharanaq’s mosque and hoseyniyeh ===
It is a Shabestani planned mosque connected to the hoseyniyeh. The Shabestan is still in use and also there is a smaller mosque outside Kharanaq castle, right in front of the gate.
