= Ishgah =

Ishgah (Persian: ايشگاه) may refer to:

- Ishgah, Lahijan
- Ishgah, Rudboneh, Lahijan County
