= Khargushi =

Khargushi (Persian: خرگوشي) may refer to:

- Khargushi, Hormozgan
- Khargushi, Razavi Khorasan
- Khargushi, Yazd
