= Oscillating minaret of Kharanaq =

Minaret in Ardakan County, Iranian national heritage site

Coordinates: 32.3456°N 54.6690°E

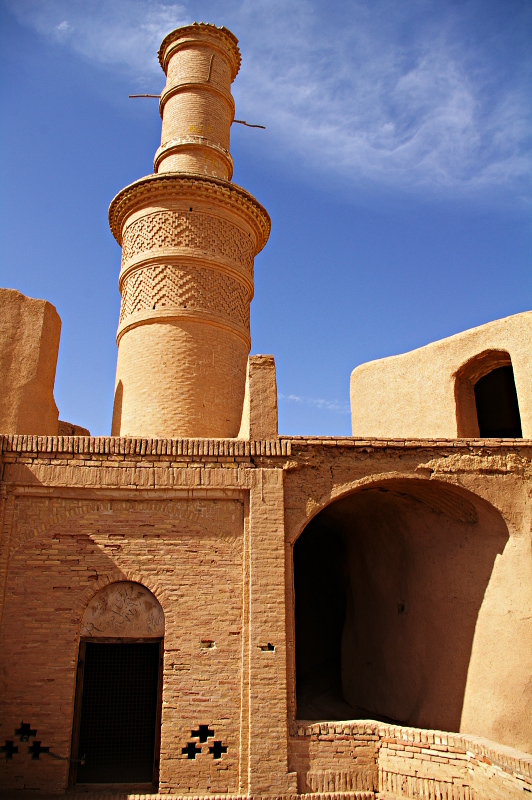
Kharanagh-minaret

The oscillating minaret of Kharanaq (Persian: منار جنبان خرانق) is located in Kharanaq in the Ardakan region of Iran. It was built in the Seljuks era, long before the construction of the Great Mosque. The movement of these minarets is clearly visible. Kharanaq attracts many tourists because of a peculiarity of its minaret.

== Structure ==
The mosque has a 15-meter-high minaret consisting of three floors, the upper part of which has a wooden structure. The minaret has a spiral staircase made up of two rows 60 to 70 cm wide at the base. In the upper parts of the minaret, wooden spools have been used to hold the components and walls.

Based on its extraordinary architecture, Khoranagh minaret shakes with the force of human hands. Khoranagh is a unique monar jonban in the world for it is completely built of clay. A simple vibration is enough for the minaret to vibrate a few seconds later. The cause of this phenomenon is still unknown in 2013. One hypothesis explains this effect due to the architecture and sculpture of the minarets; another advance that it is a visual effect.
