= Senjed =

Senjed (Persian: سنجد) may refer to:

- Elaeagnus angustifolia, a plant
- Senjed, North Khorasan
- Senjed, Yazd
