= Zarkhu =

Zarkhu may refer to:

- Zarkhu, Azerbaijan
- Zarkhu, Iran
