= Anarestan Rural District =

Anarestan Rural District (Persian: دهستان انارستان) may refer to:

- Anarestan Rural District (Bushehr Province)
- Anarestan Rural District (Fars Province)
