= Tustan =

Tustan may refer to

== Iran ==
- Tustan, Baz Kia Gurab, a village of Baz Kia Gurab Rural District

== Ukraine ==
- Tustan, Ukraine, a village in Ivano-Frankivsk Oblast
- Tustan, fortress ruins in Lviv Oblast, Ukraine
