= Chah Nu Castle =

Castle in Yazd Province, Iran

Chah Nu castle
- قلعه چاه نو

General information
- Type: Castle
- Location: Ardakan County, Iran

Chah Nu castle (Persian: قلعه چاه نو) is a historical castle located in Ardakan County in Yazd Province, The longevity of this fortress dates back to the Afsharid dynasty.
