= Sarv-e Olya Castle =

Castle in Yazd Province, Iran

Sarv-e Olya castle
- قلعه سروعلیا

General information
- Type: Castle
- Location: Ardakan County, Iran

Sarv-e Olya castle (Persian: قلعه سروعلیا) is a historical castle located in Ardakan County in Yazd Province, The longevity of this fortress dates back to the Late Islamic period.
