= Sarv-e Sofla Castle =

Castle in Yazd Province, Iran

Sarv-e Sofla castle
- قلعه سرو سفلی

General information
- Type: Castle
- Location: Ardakan County, Iran

Sarv-e Sofla castle (Persian: قلعه سرو سفلی) is a historical castle located in Ardakan County in Yazd Province, The longevity of this fortress dates back to the Qajar dynasty.
