= Haftadar =

Village in Yazd province, Iran

Haftadar Persian: هفتادر
- Village
- Location within Iran
- Coordinates: 32°27′05″N 53°41′52″E
- Country: Iran
- Province: Yazd
- County: Ardakan
- District: Aqda
- Rural District: Aqda

Population (2016)
  - Total: 404
- Time zone: UTC+3:30 (IRST)

Haftadar (Persian: هفتادر) (Note: Also romanized as Haftādar and Haftādor; also known as Hafdar, Haft Tahal, Haft Tahl, Haftād Dar, and Haftādorr) is a village in Aqda Rural District of Aqda District of Ardakan County, Yazd province, Iran.

== Demographics ==
=== Population ===
At the time of the 2006 National Census, the village's population was 541 in 160 households. The following census in 2011 counted 466 people in 146 households. The 2016 census measured the population of the village as 404 people in 148 households. It was the most populous village in its rural district.
