= Lashidan =

Lashidan (Persian: لاشيدان) may refer to:

- Lashidan-e Hokumati
- Lashidan-e Motlaq
