= Chah Afzal Castle =

Castle in Yazd Province, Iran

Chah Afzal castle
- قلعه چاه افضل

General information
- Type: Castle
- Location: Ardakan County, Iran

Chah Afzal castle (Persian: قلعه چاه افضل) is a historical castle located in Ardakan County in Yazd Province, The longevity of this fortress dates back to the Safavid dynasty.
