= Kikuh =

Kikuh or Keykuh (Persian: كي كوه) may refer to:

- Kikuh, Mazandaran
- Keykuh, Yazd
