= Electoral history of Mohammad Khatami =

List of elections featuring Mohammad Khatami as a candidate

This is a summary of the electoral history of Mohammad Khatami, an Iranian Reformist politician who has been previously President of Iran (1997–2005) and member of Islamic Consultative Assembly (1980–1982) from Ardakan.

== Parliament election ==
=== 1980 ===
In the election he was placed first in Ardakan, receiving 32,942 out of 40,112 (82.1%) votes.

== Ministry approval ==
Khatami was nominated and approved for Ministry of Culture and Islamic Guidance by Iranian Parliament on consecutive times.

Majlis Term	Year	Votes	%	Nominated by
1st	1982	121 / 170 27 against, 22 abstained	71.17	Mir Hossein Mousavi
2nd	1986	158 / 205 28 against, 19 abstained	77.07	Mir Hossein Mousavi
3rd	1988	175 / 247 57 against, 15 abstained	70.85	Mir Hossein Mousavi
3rd	1989	246 / 260 10 against, 4 abstained	94.61	Akbar Hashemi Rafsanjani

== Presidential elections ==
=== 1997 ===
According to Nohen et al, Khatami won with 20,078,187 votes (69.07%). ISSDP reported that Khatami won with 20,138,784 votes (69.1%).

=== 2001 ===
According to Sahliyeh and RFE/RL, Khatami won with 21,656,476 votes (76.90%).
