= Anarestan, Yazd =

Anarestan انارستان
- Village
- Location within Iran
- Coordinates: 32°23′23″N 53°29′52″E
- Country: Iran
- Province: Yazd
- County: Ardakan
- Bakhsh: Aqda
- Rural District: Narestan

Population (2006)
  - Total: 40
- Time zone: UTC+3:30 (IRST)
  - Summer (DST): UTC+4:30 (IRDT)

Anarestan (Persian: انارستان, also Romanized as Anārestān; also known as Anāristān and Nārestān) is a village in Narestan Rural District, Aqda District, Ardakan County, Yazd Province, Iran. At the 2006 census, its population was 40, in 12 families.
