= Asil Castle =

Castle in Yazd Province, Iran

Asil castle
- قلعه اصیل

General information
- Type: Castle
- Location: Ardakan County, Iran

Asil castle (Persian: قلعه اصیل) is a historical castle located in Ardakan County in Yazd Province, The longevity of this fortress dates back to the Afsharid dynasty.
