= Hamane =

Hamane can refer to:

- Hamane Niang, a Malian politician
- Hamane Robatat, a village in Iran
- Kazem Vaziri Hamane, an Iranian engineer
