= Hafdar =

Hafdar (Persian: هفدر) may refer to:

- Hafdar, Yazd
- Hafdar Rural District, in Semnan Province
