= Deh Sar, Baz Kia Gurab =

Dehsar دهسر
- Village
- Location within Iran
- Coordinates: 37°12′07″N 49°55′37″E
- Country: Iran
- Province: Gilan
- County: Lahijan
- Bakhsh: Central
- Rural District: Baz Kia Gurab

Population (2016)
  - Total: 326
- Time zone: UTC+3:30 (IRST)

Dehsar (Persian: دهسر) is a village in Baz Kia Gurab Rural District, in the Central District of Lahijan County, Gilan Province, Iran. At the 2016 census, its population was 326, in 124 families. Down from 432 people in 2006. The village is surrounded by rice fields which is the main job of most people who live here.
