= Sarva =

Sarva may refer to:

- Sarva (music), a musical genre of Iran
- śarva, meaning "archer", an epithet of the Vedic deity Rudra, and subsequently of the Hindu deity Shiva

== See also ==
- Sarv (disambiguation)
