= Baz Kia Gurab =

Village in Gilan province, Iran

Baz Kia Gurab Persian: باز كيا گوراب
- Village
- Location within Iran
- Coordinates: 37°13′12″N 49°57′39″E
- Country: Iran
- Province: Gilan
- County: Lahijan
- District: Central
- Rural District: Baz Kia Gurab

Population (2016)
  - Total: 4,166
- Time zone: UTC+3:30 (IRST)

Baz Kia Gurab (Persian: بازكياگوراب) (Note: Also romanized as Bāz Keyā Gūrāb, Bāz Kīā Gūrāb, Bāz Kīyā Gūrāb, and Bāzkīā Gūrāb; also known as Bāzgīā Gūrāb, Bazkiya Koorab, Bāzkiya Qurāb, Bazkiya-Kurab, and Keyā Gūrāb) is a village in, and the capital of, Baz Kia Gurab Rural District in the Central District of Lahijan County, Gilan province, Iran.

The village is 3 km (1.9 mi) west of Lahijan city, on a Road intersection connecting Lahijan to Rasht and Siahkal. It has a humid climate common in the plains of Gilan.

== Demographics ==
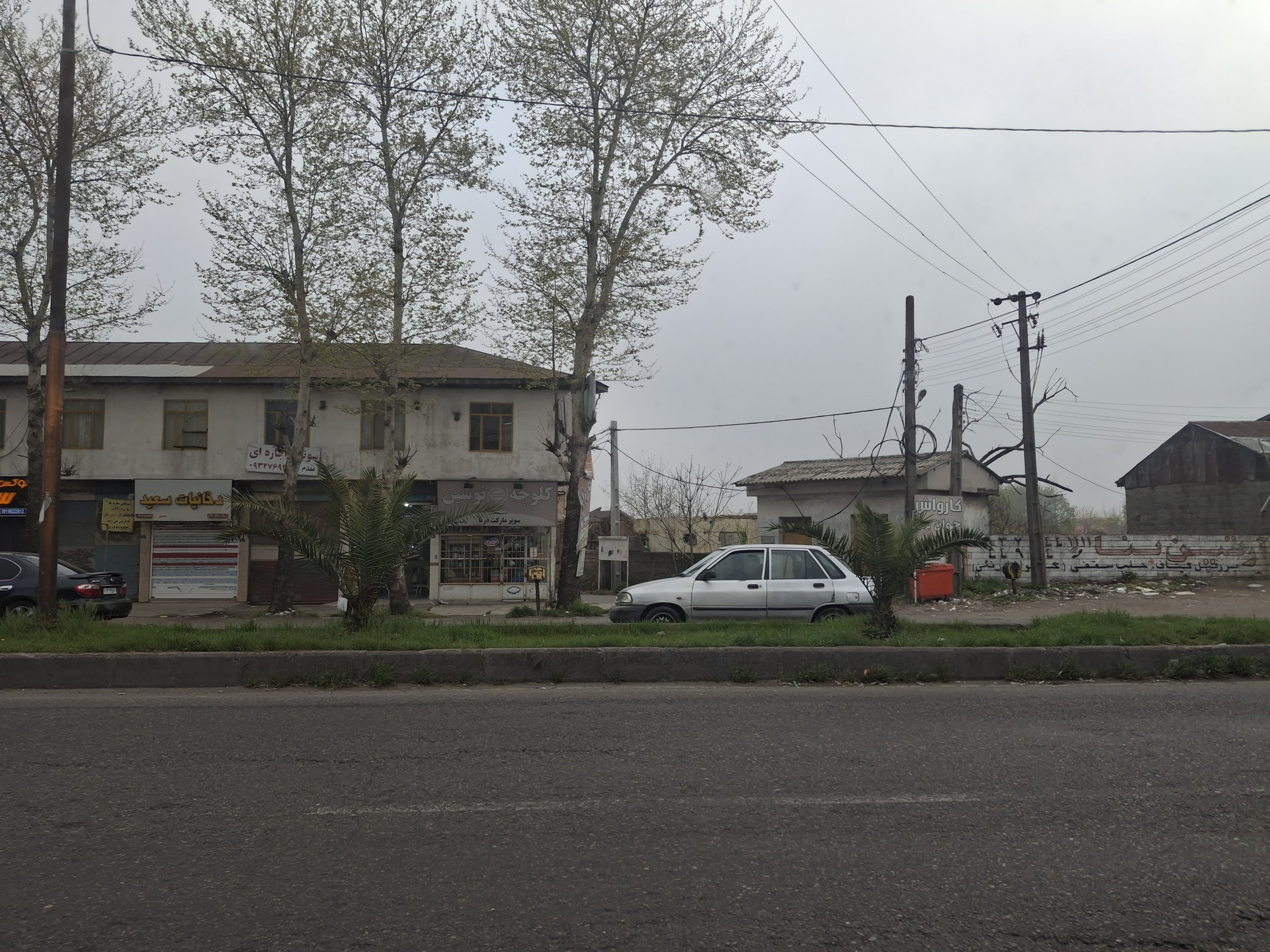
Baz Kiya Gurab, Lahijan, Iran

People of Baz Kia Gurab are shia muslim and speak Persian and Gilaki languages. Agricultural products of the village are rice, tea and silk. Mat and basket weaving have also been common in the village.

=== Population ===
Baz Kia Gurab Population history
Year	Pop.	±%
1949	2,000	—
1956	2,528	+26.4%
1966	2,580	+2.1%
1976	3,761	+45.8%
1986	4,361	+16.0%
2006	4,213	−3.4%
2011	4,491	+6.6%
2016	4,166	−7.2%

At the 1966 census, Baz Kia Gurab's population was 2,580 in 513 households. The village had 70 ha (170 acres) of rice fields and 400 ha (990 acres) of tea gardens. The main source of water were "Kiaju" and "Shamrud" rivers as there was no tap water access.

At the 1986 national census, the village had a population of 4,361 in 903 households, of which 2,353 were educated and 1,562 were employed. Baz Kia Gurab had several facilities during the census such as school, mosque, medical clinic, public phone, and access to public transportation.

At the time of the 2006 National Census, the village's population was 4,213 in 1,220 households. The following census in 2011 counted 4,491 people in 1,489 households. The 2016 census measured the population of the village as 4,166 people in 1,469 households. It was the most populous village in its rural district.
