= Bahador Kalayeh =

Bahador Kalayeh بهادركلايه
- Village
- Location within Iran
- Coordinates: 37°10′43″N 49°57′16″E
- Country: Iran
- Province: Gilan
- County: Lahijan
- Bakhsh: Central
- Rural District: Baz Kia Gurab

Population (2016)
  - Total: 129
- Time zone: UTC+3:30+ (IRST)

Bahador Kalayeh (Persian: بهادركلايه, also Romanized as Bahādor Kalāyeh) is a village in the Baz Kia Gurab Rural District, Central District of Lahijan County, Gilan Province, Iran. As of the 2016 census, the village had a population of 129 people in 47 families. Down from 199 people in 2006.
