= Aqda =

City in Yazd province, Iran

Aqda Persian: عقدا
- City
- Location within Iran
- Coordinates: 32°26′23″N 53°37′58″E
- Country: Iran
- Province: Yazd
- County: Ardakan
- District: Aqda

Population (2016)
  - Total: 1,754
- Time zone: UTC+3:30 (IRST)

Aqda (Persian: عقدا) (Note: Also romanized as ‘Aqdā; also known as Aghda) is a city in, and the capital of, Aqda District of Ardakan County, Yazd province, Iran, and also serves as the administrative center for Aqda Rural District.

== Demographics ==
=== Population ===
At the time of the 2006 National Census, the city's population was 1,583 in 432 households. The following census in 2011 counted 1,809 people in 566 households. The 2016 census measured the population of the city as 1,754 people in 602 households, all Persians.

The city was founded by one of the military commanders of Yazdegerd I, the Sasanian ruler of Iran from 399 to 420.

== Sources ==
- Choksy, Jamsheed K. (2020). "Yazd: a "Good and Noble City" and an "Abode of Worship"". In Durand-Guédy, David; Mottahedeh, Roy; Paul, Jürgen (eds.). Cities of Medieval Iran. Brill. pp. 217–252. ISBN 978-90-04-43433-2.
