= Sadat Mahalleh, Baz Kia Gurab =

Sadat Mahalleh سادات محله
- Village
- Location within Iran
- Coordinates: 37°11′10″N 49°56′07″E
- Country: Iran
- Province: Gilan
- County: Lahijan
- Bakhsh: Central
- Rural District: Baz Kia Gurab

Population (2016)
  - Total: 144
- Time zone: UTC+3:30 (IRST)

Sadat Mahalleh (Persian: سادات محله, also Romanized as Sādāt Maḩalleh; also known as Sādāt Maḩalleh-ye Gelrūdbār) is a village in Baz Kia Gurab Rural District, in the Central District of Lahijan County, Gilan Province, Iran. At the 2016 census, its population was 144, in 52 families. Down from 198 people in 2006.
