= Tabar Kalayeh =

Tabar Kalayeh تبركلايه
- Village
- Location within Iran
- Coordinates: 37°12′08″N 49°56′48″E
- Country: Iran
- Province: Gilan
- County: Lahijan
- Bakhsh: Central
- Rural District: Baz Kia Gurab

Population (2016)
  - Total: 180
- Time zone: UTC+3:30 (IRST)

Tabar Kalayeh (Persian: تبركلايه, also Romanized as Tabar Kalāyeh; also known as Tabar Kalā-ye Gelrūdbār and Tabar Kalā-ye Kalrūdbār) is a village in Baz Kia Gurab Rural District, in the Central District of Lahijan County, Gilan Province, Iran. At the 2016 census, its population was 180, in 74 families.
