= Derapeshtan =

Derapeshtan دراپشتان
- Village
- Interactive map of Derapeshtan
- Coordinates: 37°12′38.67″N 49°55′31.02″E
- Country: Iran
- Province: Gilan
- County: Lahijan
- Bakhsh: Central
- Rural District: Baz Kia Gurab

Population (2016)
  - Total: 174
- Time zone: UTC+3:30 (IRST)

Derapeshtan (Persian: دراپشتان, also Romanized as Derāpeshtān) is a village in Baz Kia Gurab Rural District, in the Central District of Lahijan County, Gilan Province, Iran. At the 2016 census, its population was 174, in 61 families. Down from 192 in 2006.
