= Ahmadabad, Iran =

City in Yazd province, Iran

Ahmadabad Persian: احمدآباد
- City
- Location within Iran
- Coordinates: 32°21′24″N 53°59′31″E
- Country: Iran
- Province: Yazd
- County: Ardakan
- District: Central

Population (2016)
  - Total: 6,046
- Time zone: UTC+3:30 (IRST)

Ahmadabad (Persian: احمدآباد) (Note: Also romanized as Aḩmadābād) is a city in Yazd province, Iran, serving as the administrative center for Mohammadiyeh Rural District.

== Demographics ==
=== Population ===
At the time of the 2006 National Census, the city's population was 4,693 in 1,228 households. The following census in 2011 counted 5,019 people in 1,527 households. The 2016 census measured the population of the city as 6,046 people in 1,919 households.
