= Delijan, Lahijan =

Delijan دليجان
- Village
- Location within Iran
- Coordinates: 37°11′42″N 49°55′52″E
- Country: Iran
- Province: Gilan
- County: Lahijan
- Bakhsh: Central
- Rural District: Baz Kia Gurab

Population (2016)
  - Total: 90
- Time zone: UTC+3:30 (IRST)

Delijan (Persian: دليجان, also Romanized as Delījān) is a village in Baz Kia Gurab Rural District, in the Central District of Lahijan County, Gilan Province, Iran. At the 2016 census, its population was 90, in 33 families. Down from 130 people in 2006.
