= Chafal =

Chafal چفل
- Village
- Location within Iran
- Coordinates: 37°12′33″N 49°56′38″E
- Country: Iran
- Province: Gilan
- County: Lahijan
- Bakhsh: Central
- Rural District: Baz Kia Gurab

Population (2016)
  - Total: 383
- Time zone: UTC+3:30 (IRST)

Chafal (Persian: چفل, also Romanized as Chofel; also known as Chepul, Chofīl, Pol-e Shomrūd, and Shamrūd) is a village in Baz Kia Gurab Rural District, in the Central District of Lahijan County, Gilan Province, Iran. At the 2016 census, its population was 383, in 140 families. Down from 401 in 2006.
