= Sareshkeh =

Village in Gilan province, Iran

Sareshkeh Persian: سرشكه
- Village
- Location within Iran
- Coordinates: 37°12′19″N 49°54′20″E
- Country: Iran
- Province: Gilan
- County: Lahijan
- District: Central
- Rural District: Baz Kia Gurab

Population (2016)
  - Total: 629
- Time zone: UTC+3:30 (IRST)

Sareshkeh (Persian: سرشكه) (Note: Also romanized as Sereshkeh; also known as Sereshke) is a village in Baz Kia Gurab Rural District of the Central District in Lahijan County, Gilan province, Iran.

The people of Sareshkeh for many centuries endorsed the advancement of literacy and science. Sareshkeh's rice is sold all over the country. The other products of Sareshkeh are tea, garlic, cucumber and pumpkin.

== Demographics ==
=== Language and ethnicity ===
The people of Sareshkeh are Gilak and Gileki with Bie-pish dialect is spoken in Sareshkeh. All of the people in Sareshkeh are Shi'a muslims.

=== Population ===
At the time of the 2006 National Census, the village's population was 841 in 284 households. The following census in 2011 counted 713 people in 283 households. The 2016 census measured the population of the village as 629 people in 264 households.

== Climate and weather ==
Sareshkeh enjoys a climate known as 'moderate Caspian'. This weather pattern emerged from the influence of the currents of both the Alborz Mountains and the Caspian Sea. The Talesh Mountains are stretched in a north to south direction, and the Alborz Mountains in an east to west direction. These serve as a barrier against the humid north-west Caspian winds and withhold the penetration of wind bearing vapors towards Iran's mainland, causing heavy rainfall in Gilan during the Spring and Fall seasons.

Sareshkeh, with weather more favorable than the other points in Gilan province, has warmer winters and cooler summers. Freezing temperatures are seldom reported in the coastal areas, however it is not odd for Sareshkeh to experience periods of near blizzard conditions during the winter. The amount of rainfall in Sareshkeh depends on the winds bearing vapor that blow from the North West in winter, from the East in spring and from the West in summer and autumn. These winds carry the vapor and humidity towards the plains causing heavy and prolonged rainfalls.

== Politics ==
The Sareshkeh council is the largest decision authority in Sareshkeh.

== Sports ==
The most popular sport in Sareshkeh is football. Wrestling and table football are also popular.
