= Kolashta Jan =

Village in Gilan province, Iran

Kolashta Jan Persian: كلشتاجان
- Village
- Location within Iran
- Coordinates: 37°11′17″N 49°54′30″E
- Country: Iran
- Province: Gilan
- County: Lahijan
- District: Central
- Rural District: Baz Kia Gurab

Population (2016)
  - Total: 664
- Time zone: UTC+3:30 (IRST)

Kolashta Jan (Persian: كلشتاجان) (Note: Also romanized as Kolashtā Jān and Koleshtājān; also known as Kolashtjān and Kulushtladzhan) is a village in Baz Kia Gurab Rural District of the Central District in Lahijan County, Gilan province, Iran.

== Demographics ==
=== Population ===
At the time of the 2006 National Census, the village's population was 805 in 257 households. The following census in 2011 counted 716 people in 277 households. The 2016 census measured the population of the village as 664 people in 252 households.
