= Shakakom =

Shakakom شكاكم
- Village
- Location within Iran
- Coordinates: 37°11′46″N 49°57′18″E
- Country: Iran
- Province: Gilan
- County: Lahijan
- Bakhsh: Central
- Rural District: Baz Kia Gurab

Population (2016)
  - Total: 370
- Time zone: UTC+3:30 (IRST)

Shakakom (Persian: شكاكم, also Romanized as Shakākom) is a village in Baz Kia Gurab Rural District, in the Central District of Lahijan County, Gilan Province, Iran. At the 2016 census, its population was 370, in 130 families. Down from 391 in 2006.
