= Pir (Zoroastrianism) =

Zoroastrian pilgrimage site

Pir (Persian: پیر) refers to a site of pilgrimage, typically one of the Zoroastrian faith, in Persian. Pirs range from localized devotional sites to major centers of worship. Among the most well-known pirs are the six mountain pir which can be found in and around the city of Yazd, Iran: Seti Pir, Pir-e Sabz, Pir-e Nāraki, Pir-e Bānu, Pir-e Herisht, and Pir-e Nārestān. However, pirs can be found in cities throughout the Persian world including Kerman, Shiraz and Tehran.

== Structure of a Pir ==
There is no universal principle of design in Zoroastrian religious architecture; as a result, each pir has its own unique structures and features. However, there are certain traits which many pirs possess such as an altar-like structure used to house atar or sacred fires. In mountain pirs, shrines often take the form of a large stone or solid piece of rock. Many of the larger shrines are located near a natural water source, the water of which may be considered sacred as well. Often, plane trees or cypresses can be found in or near the pir. To these trees are sometimes tied wish-ribbons, a form of decorative, occasionally highly complex, textile garlands.

== Modern practices ==
Traditionally, pilgrims would spend three days at pirs before departing; however, in modern times this practice has declined. The only exception to this is in Pir-e Sabz, where it is still common for worshippers to remain near the site from June 15 to 18, the traditional dates of pilgrimage. In Vancouver, the Zoroastrian community annually gathers in a specific spot in the mountains on June 13 and practices the rituals and traditions that they would be enacting were they able to travel to Pir-e Sabz itself. This community has observed the pilgrimage days in this manner since 1999.

== See also ==
- Shrine
- Fire temple
