= Bala Mahalleh-ye Golrudbar =

Bala Mahalleh-ye Golrudbar بالامحله گلرودبار
- Village
- Location within Iran
- Coordinates: 37°10′43″N 49°55′54″E
- Country: Iran
- Province: Gilan
- County: Lahijan
- Bakhsh: Central
- Rural District: Baz Kia Gurab

Population (2016)
  - Total: 160
- Time zone: UTC+3:30 (IRST)

Bala Mahalleh-ye Golrudbar (Persian: بالامحله گلرودبار, also Romanized as Bālā Maḩalleh-ye Golrūdbār and Bālā Maḩalleh-ye Gol-e Rūdbār) is a village in Baz Kia Gurab Rural District, in the Central District of Lahijan County, Gilan Province, Iran. At the 2016 census, its population was 160, in 61 families. Down from 209 people in 2006.
