= Baz Kia Gurab Rural District =

Rural district in Gilan province, Iran

Baz Kia Gurab Rural District Persian: دهستان باز كيا گوراب
- Rural District
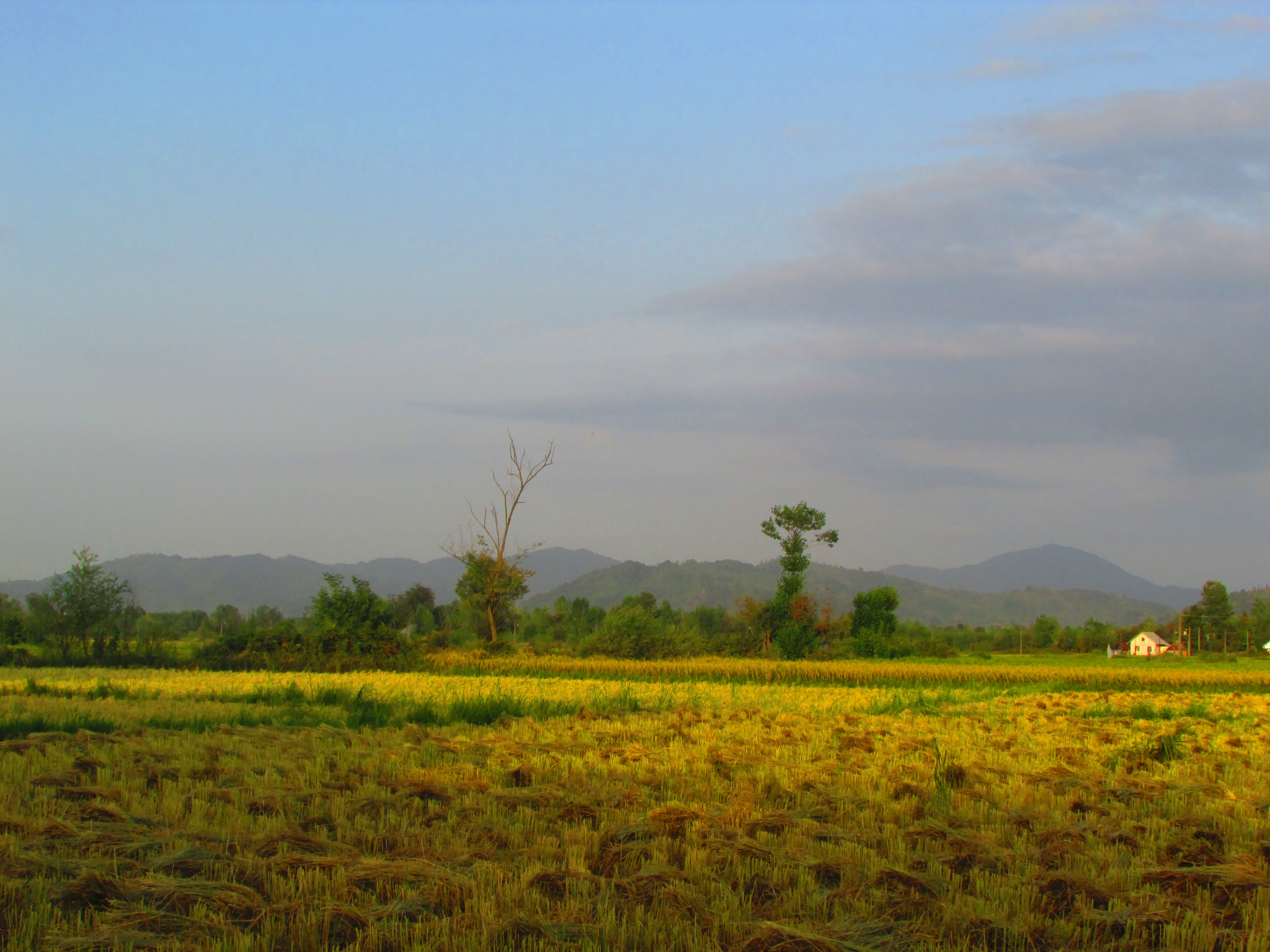
- Rice fields in Golrudbar

- Location within Iran
- Coordinates: 37°12′N 49°57′E
- Country: Iran
- Province: Gilan
- County: Lahijan
- District: Central
- Established: 1987
- Capital: Baz Kia Gurab

Population (2016)
  - Total: 11,603
- Time zone: UTC+3:30 (IRST)

Baz Kia Gurab Rural District (Persian: دهستان باز كيا گوراب) is in the Central District of Lahijan County, Gilan province, Iran. Its capital is the village of Baz Kia Gurab.

== Demographics ==
=== Population ===
At the time of the 2006 National Census, the rural district's population was 15,029 in 4,430 households. There were 12,389 inhabitants in 4,201 households at the following census of 2011. The 2016 census measured the population of the rural district as 11,603 in 4,160 households. The most populous of its 19 villages was Baz Kia Gurab, with 4,166 people.

=== Other villages in the rural district ===
- Anarestan
- Bahador Kalayeh
- Bala Mahalleh-ye Golrudbar
- Chafal
- Deh Sar
- Delijan
- Derapeshtan
- Ishgah
- Kolashta Jan
- Lashidan-e Hokumati
- Malbijar
- Mian Mahalleh-ye Golrudbar
- Pain Mahalleh-ye Golrudbar
- Sadat Mahalleh
- Sareshkeh
- Shakakom
- Tabar Kalayeh
- Tustan
