= Sarvu =

Sarvu سروو
- Village
- Location within Iran
- Coordinates: 28°28′47″N 53°45′11″E
- Country: Iran
- Province: Fars
- County: Jahrom
- Bakhsh: Central
- Rural District: Kuhak

Population (2006)
  - Total: 138
- Time zone: UTC+3:30 (IRST)
  - Summer (DST): UTC+4:30 (IRDT)

Sarvu (Persian: سروو, also Romanized as Sarvū; also known as Sarv) is a village in Kuhak Rural District, in the Central District of Jahrom County, Fars province, Iran. At the 2006 census, its population was 138, in 33 families.
