= Anarestan, Gilan =

Anarestan انارستان
- Village
- Location within Iran
- Coordinates: 37°11′46″N 49°55′14″E
- Country: Iran
- Province: Gilan
- County: Lahijan
- Bakhsh: Central
- Rural District: Baz Kia Gurab

Population (2016)
  - Total: 341
- Time zone: UTC+3:30 (IRST)

Anarestan (Persian: انارستان, also Romanized as Anārestān and Anarstan) is a village in Baz Kia Gurab Rural District, in the Central District of Lahijan County, Gilan Province, Iran. At the 2016 census, its population was 341, in 121 families. Down from 419 people in 2006.
