= Dorond-e Olya =

Dorond-e Olya درندعليا
- Village
- Location within Iran
- Coordinates: 31°48′34″N 55°53′32″E
- Country: Iran
- Province: Yazd
- County: Behabad
- Bakhsh: Central
- Rural District: Jolgeh

Population (2006)
  - Total: 54
- Time zone: UTC+3:30 (IRST)
  - Summer (DST): UTC+4:30 (IRDT)

Dorond-e Olya (Persian: درندعليا, also Romanized as Dorond-e ‘Olyā; also known as Dorond) is a village in Jolgeh Rural District, in the Central District of Behabad County, Yazd Province, Iran. At the 2006 census, its population was 54, in 13 families.
