= Tustan, Baz Kia Gurab =

Village in Gilan province, Iran

Tustan Persian: توستان
- Village
- Location within Iran
- Coordinates: 37°13′36″N 49°58′47″E
- Country: Iran
- Province: Gilan
- County: Lahijan
- District: Central
- Rural District: Baz Kia Gurab

Population (2016)
  - Total: 897
- Time zone: UTC+3:30 (IRST)

Tustan (Persian: توستان) (Note: Also romanized as Toostan and Tūstān) is a village in Baz Kia Gurab Rural District of the Central District in Lahijan County, Gilan province, Iran. The village is located northwest of Lahijan's city limits, near the industrial town.

== Demographics ==
=== Population ===
At the time of the 2006 National Census, the village's population was 1,013 in 296 households. The following census in 2011 counted 951 people in 328 households. The 2016 census measured the population of the village as 897 people in 317 households.
