= Ishgah, Lahijan =

Village in Gilan province, Iran

Ishgah Persian: ايشگاه
- Village
- Location within Iran
- Coordinates: 37°12′19″N 49°57′37″E
- Country: Iran
- Province: Gilan
- County: Lahijan
- District: Central
- Rural District: Baz Kia Gurab

Population (2016)
  - Total: 510
- Time zone: UTC+3:30 (IRST)

Ishgah (Persian: ايشگاه) (Note: Also romanized as Īshgāh; also known as Īshkā’) is a village in Baz Kia Gurab Rural District of the Central District in Lahijan County, Gilan province, Iran.

== Demographics ==
=== Population ===
At the time of the 2006 National Census, the village's population was 373 in 102 households. The following census in 2011 counted 430 people in 157 households. The 2016 census measured the population of the village as 510 people in 176 households.
