= Lashidan-e Hokumati =

Village in Gilan province, Iran

Lashidan-e Hokumati Persian: لاشيدان حكومتي
- Village
- Location within Iran
- Coordinates: 37°13′22″N 49°59′13″E
- Country: Iran
- Province: Gilan
- County: Lahijan
- District: Central
- Rural District: Baz Kia Gurab

Population (2016)
  - Total: 1,352
- Time zone: UTC+3:30 (IRST)

Lashidan-e Hokumati (Persian: لاشيدان حكومتي) (Note: Also romanized as Lāshīdān-e Ḩokūmatī) is a village in Baz Kia Gurab Rural District of the Central District in Lahijan County, Gilan province, Iran. The village is located north of Lahijan's city limits, north of the city's ring road.

== Demographics ==
=== Population ===
At the time of the 2006 National Census, the village's population was 1,425 in 402 households. The following census in 2011 counted 1,444 people in 458 households. The 2016 census measured the population of the village as 1,352 people in 466 households.
