= Narestan =

Narestan نارستان
- Village
- Location within Iran
- Coordinates: 35°48′12″N 57°15′33″E
- Country: Iran
- Province: Razavi Khorasan
- County: Sabzevar
- Bakhsh: Rud Ab
- Rural District: Kuh Hamayi

Population (2006)
  - Total: 38
- Time zone: UTC+3:30 (IRST)
  - Summer (DST): UTC+4:30 (IRDT)

Narestan (Persian: نارستان, also Romanized as Nārestān) is a village in Kuh Hamayi Rural District, Rud Ab District, Sabzevar County, Razavi Khorasan Province, Iran. At the 2006 census, its population was 38, in 11 families.
