= Pain Mahalleh-ye Golrudbar =

Pain Mahalleh-ye Golrudbar پائين محله گلرودبار
- Village
- Location within Iran
- Coordinates: 37°10′18″N 49°55′30″E
- Country: Iran
- Province: Gilan
- County: Lahijan
- Bakhsh: Central
- Rural District: Baz Kia Gurab

Population (2016)
  - Total: 190
- Time zone: UTC+3:30 (IRST)

Pain Mahalleh-ye Golrudbar (Persian: پائين محله گلرودبار, also Romanized as Pā’īn Maḩalleh-ye Golrūdbār and Pā’īn Maḩalleh-ye Gol-e Rūdbār; also known as Galrūdbār) is a village in Baz Kia Gurab Rural District, in the Central District of Lahijan County, Gilan Province, Iran. At the 2016 census, its population was 190, in 75 families. Up from 188 in 2006.
