= Malbijar =

Village in Gilan province, Iran

Malbijar Persian: مال بيجار
- Village
- Location within Iran
- Coordinates: 37°12′17″N 49°58′46″E
- Country: Iran
- Province: Gilan
- County: Lahijan
- District: Central
- Rural District: Baz Kia Gurab

Population (2016)
  - Total: 510
- Time zone: UTC+3:30 (IRST)

Malbijar (Persian: مال بيجار) (Note: Also romanized as Mālbījār) is a village in Baz Kia Gurab Rural District of the Central District in Lahijan County, Gilan province, Iran. The village is located just west of Lahijan's city limits.

== Demographics ==
=== Population ===
At the time of the 2006 National Census, the village's population was 158 in 42 households. The following census in 2011 counted 529 people in 124 households. The 2016 census measured the population of the village as 510 people in 141 households.
