= Mian Mahalleh-ye Golrudbar =

Mian Mahalleh-ye Golrudbar ميان محله گلرودبار
- Village
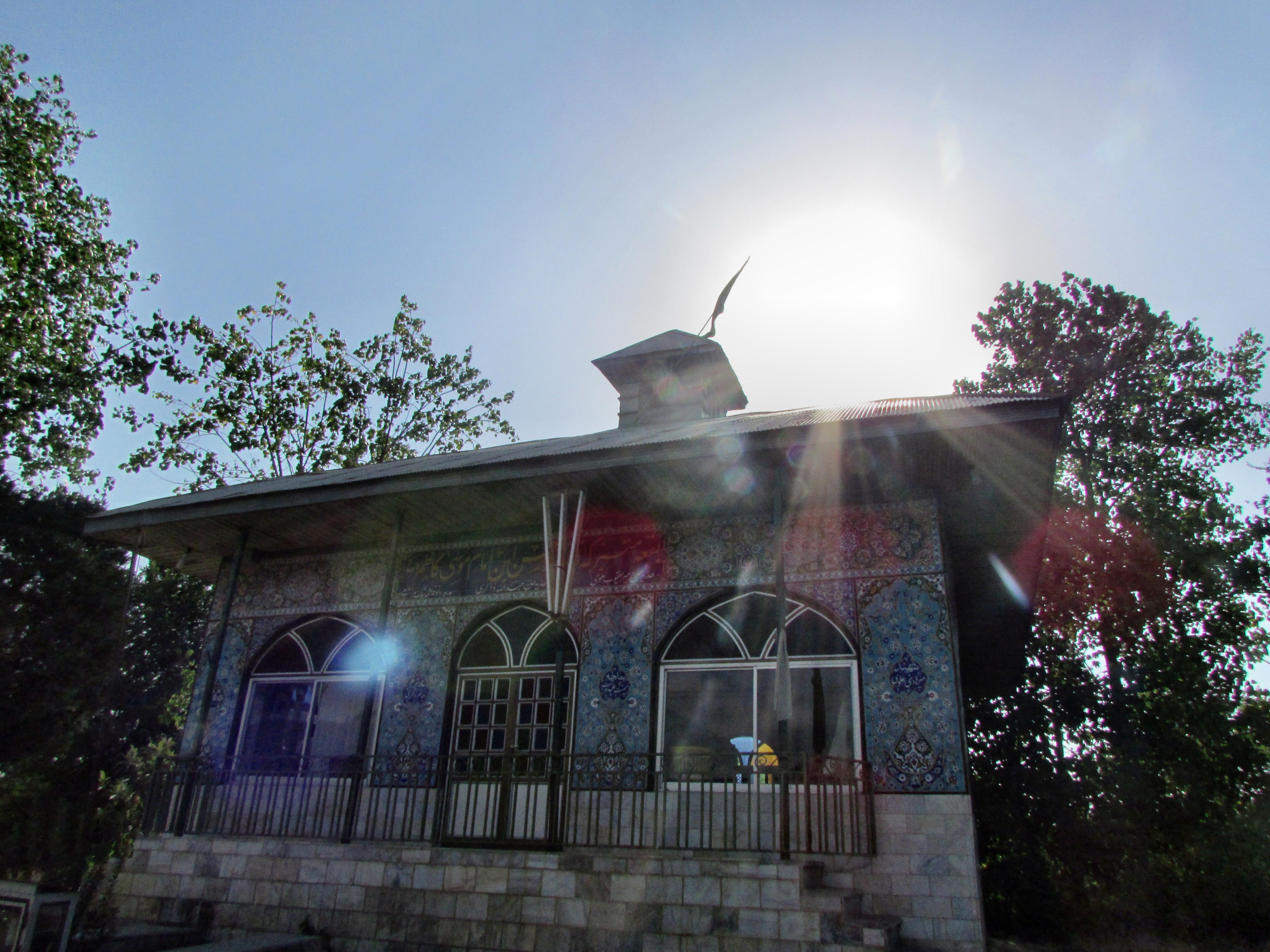
- Aqa Seyyed Hassan mausoleum

- Location within Iran
- Coordinates: 37°10′08″N 49°56′00″E
- Country: Iran
- Province: Gilan
- County: Lahijan
- Bakhsh: Central
- Rural District: Baz Kia Gurab

Population (2016)
  - Total: 388
- Time zone: UTC+3:30 (IRST)

Mian Mahalleh-ye Golrudbar (Persian: ميان محله گلرودبار, also Romanized as Mīān Maḩalleh-ye Golrūdbār; also known as Gelrūdbār, Gil-i-Rudbar, Gol Roodbar, Golrūdbār, Gul-i-Rūdbār, and Kolrūdbār) is a village in Baz Kia Gurab Rural District, in the Central District of Lahijan County, Gilan Province, Iran. At the 2006 census, its population was 388, in 157 families. Down from 503 people in 2006.
