= Anarestan, Kerman =

Anarestan انارستان
- Village
- Location within Iran
- Coordinates: 30°30′22″N 57°16′36″E
- Country: Iran
- Province: Kerman
- County: Kerman
- Bakhsh: Central
- Rural District: Derakhtengan

Population (2006)
  - Total: 153
- Time zone: UTC+3:30 (IRST)
  - Summer (DST): UTC+4:30 (IRDT)

Anarestan (Persian: انارستان, also Romanized as Anārestān; also known as Anāristān and Darb Anārestān) is a village in Derakhtengan Rural District, in the Central District of Kerman County, Kerman Province, Iran. At the 2006 census, its population was 153, in 42 families.
