= Anarestan, Jam =

City in Bushehr province, Iran

Anarestan Persian: انارستان
- City
- Location within Iran
- Coordinates: 28°01′56″N 52°03′52″E
- Country: Iran
- Province: Bushehr
- County: Jam
- District: Riz
- Established as a city: 2009

Population (2016)
  - Total: 3,400
- Time zone: UTC+3:30 (IRST)

Anarestan (Persian: انارستان) (Note: Also romanized as Anārestān; also known as Nārestān) is a city in Riz District of Jam County, Bushehr province, Iran, serving as the administrative center for Anarestan Rural District.

== Demographics ==
=== Population ===
At the time of the 2006 National Census, Anarestan's population was 1,857 in 409 households, when it was a village in Anarestan Rural District. The following census in 2011 counted 2,735 people in 658 households, by which time Anarestan had merged with the village of Golestan and was converted to a city. The 2016 census measured the population of the city as 3,400 people in 904 households.
