= Mohammadiyeh Rural District =

Rural district in Yazd province, Iran

Mohammadiyeh Rural District Persian: دهستان محمديه
- Rural District
- Location within Iran
- Coordinates: 32°34′31″N 54°02′40″E
- Country: Iran
- Province: Yazd
- County: Ardakan
- District: Central
- Capital: Ahmadabad

Population (2016)
  - Total: 5,261
- Time zone: UTC+3:30 (IRST)

Mohammadiyeh Rural District (Persian: دهستان محمديه) is in the Central District of Ardakan County, Yazd province, Iran. It is administered from the city of Ahmadabad.

== Demographics ==
=== Population ===
At the time of the 2006 National Census, the rural district's population was 3,085 in 794 households. There were 3,611 inhabitants in 1,067 households at the following census of 2011. The 2016 census measured the population of the rural district as 5,261 in 1,270 households. The most populous of its 121 villages was Torkabad, with 1,138 people.
