= Ardakan =

City in Yazd province, Iran

Ardakan Persian: اردکان
- City
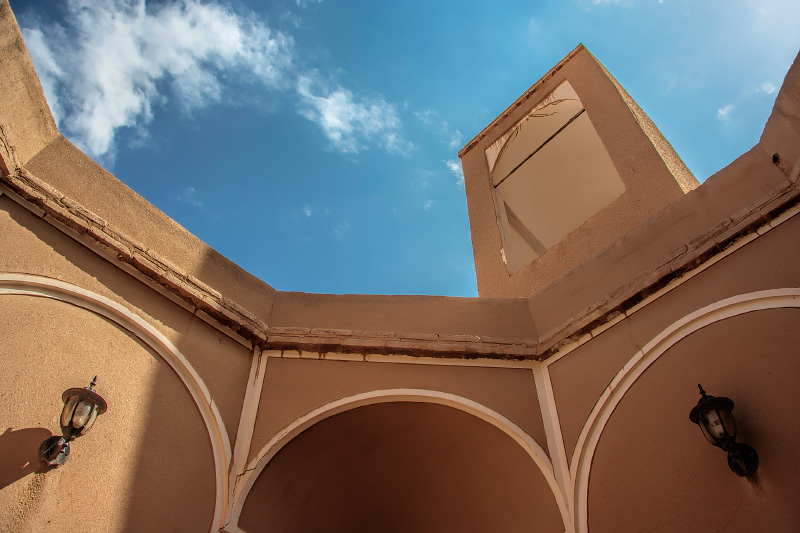
- Building in the Old Town of Ardakan

- Location within Iran
- Coordinates: 32°18′34″N 54°01′07″E
- Country: Iran
- Province: Yazd
- County: Ardakan
- District: Central

Population (2016)
  - Total: 75,271
- Time zone: UTC+3:30 (IRST)

Ardakan (Persian: اردكان) (Note: Also romanized as Ardakān and Artagan) is a city in the Central District of Ardakan County, Yazd province, Iran, serving as capital of both the county and the district.

== Demographics ==
=== Population ===
At the time of the 2006 National Census, the city's population was 51,349 in 13,730 households. The following census in 2011 counted 56,776 people in 16,198 households. The 2016 census measured the population of the city as 75,271 people in 22,475 households.

== Climate ==
The record high temperature of 47.5 °C (117.5 °F) was registered on 4 July 2025 in Ardakan.

== Overview ==
Ardakan is the second major city of Yazd province. It was established in the 12th century in the Zardug region. Ardakan is 60 kilometres away from Yazd, and it has dry weather.

The word Ardakan in Persian means "holy place" or "clean place" (Modern Persian: arda+kan / Middle Persian: arta+gan) and the city has many historical religious attractions such as the Grand Mosque of Ardakan (Masjed-e Jame'), Zire-deh Mosque, Emam-Zadeh Mir Seyyed Mohammad and Takyeh bazaar.

The most important shrine is Pir-e Sabz Chak Chak. Other shrines include Pir Shah Eshtad Izad, Pir Shah Tashtar Izad, Pir Shah Mehr Izad and Pir Shah Morad.

Ardakan is the birthplace of former Iranian president, Mohammad Khatami. It is also a famous type of carpet found around the world.

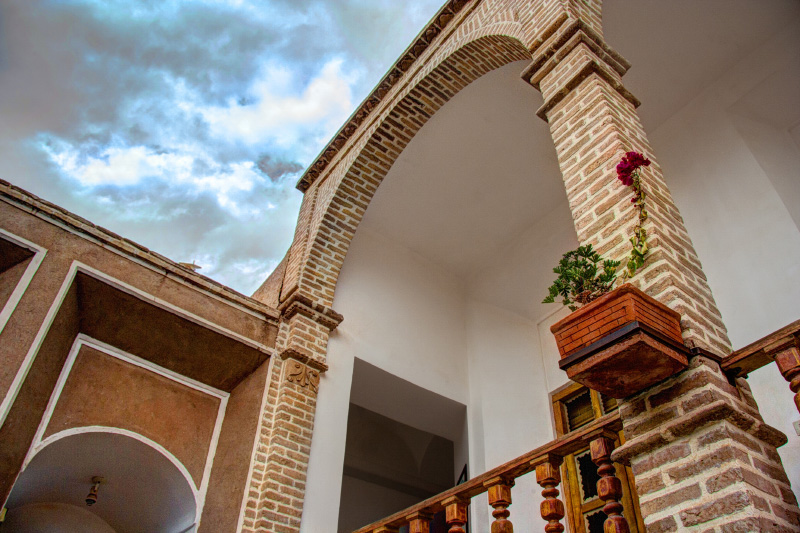
View of building in Old Town Ardakan

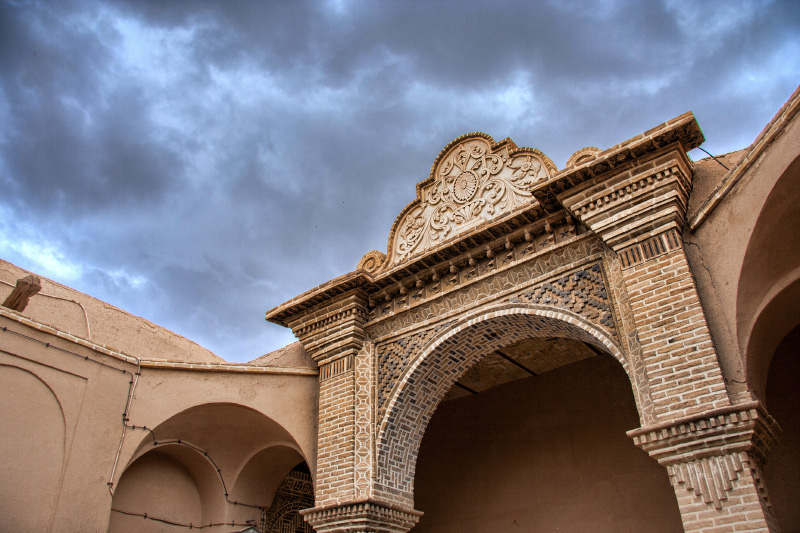
View of building in Old Town Ardakan

The city's neighbourhoods include Zeyn Aldin, Koshkeno, Bazarno, and Jannat Abad.

== Notable people ==
- Mohammad Khatami, Iranian president
- Reza Davari Ardakani, philosopher
- Ali Khatami
