= Central District (Ardakan County) =

District in Yazd province, Iran

Central District (Ardakan County) Persian: بخش مرکزی شهرستان اردکان
- District
- Location within Iran
- Coordinates: 32°34′31″N 54°02′40″E
- Country: Iran
- Province: Yazd
- County: Ardakan
- Capital: Ardakan

Population (2016)
  - Total: 86,578
- Time zone: UTC+3:30 (IRST)

The Central District of Ardakan County (Persian: بخش مرکزی شهرستان اردکان) is in Yazd province, Iran. Its capital is the city of Ardakan.

== Demographics ==
=== Population ===
At the time of the 2006 National Census, the district's population was 59,127 in 15,752 households. The following census in 2011 counted 65,406 people in 18,792 households. The 2016 census measured the population of the district as 86,578 inhabitants in 25,664 households.

=== Administrative divisions ===
Central District (Ardakan County) Population
Administrative Divisions	2006	2011	2016
Mohammadiyeh RD	3,085	3,611	5,261
Ahmadabad (city)	4,693	5,019	6,046
Ardakan (city)	51,349	56,776	75,271
Total	59,127	65,406	86,578
RD = Rural District
