= Anarestan Rural District (Jam County) =

Rural district in Bushehr province, Iran

Anarestan Rural District Persian: دهستان انارستان
- Rural District
- Location within Iran
- Coordinates: 28°02′N 52°03′E
- Country: Iran
- Province: Bushehr
- County: Jam
- District: Riz
- Established: 2003
- Capital: Anarestan

Population (2016)
  - Total: 666
- Time zone: UTC+3:30 (IRST)

Anarestan Rural District (Persian: دهستان انارستان) is in Riz District of Jam County, Bushehr province, Iran. It is administered from the city of Anarestan.

== Demographics ==
=== Population ===
At the time of the 2006 National Census, the rural district's population was 2,891 in 621 households. There were 616 inhabitants in 148 households at the following census of 2011. The 2016 census measured the population of the rural district as 666 in 183 households. The most populous of its 11 villages was Sar Cheshmeh, with 407 people.

=== Other villages in the rural district ===
- Tall-e Hajj Now Shad
