= Narestan Rural District =

Rural district in Yazd province, Iran

Narestan Rural District Persian: دهستان نارستان
- Rural District
- Location within Iran
- Coordinates: 32°19′47″N 53°18′13″E
- Country: Iran
- Province: Yazd
- County: Ardakan
- District: Aqda
- Capital: Hasanabad

Population (2016)
  - Total: 1,741
- Time zone: UTC+3:30 (IRST)

Narestan Rural District (Persian: دهستان نارستان) is in Aqda District of Ardakan County, Yazd province, Iran. Its capital is the village of Hasanabad.

== Demographics ==
=== Population ===
At the time of the 2006 National Census, the rural district's population was 1,526 in 481 households. There were 1,552 inhabitants in 513 households at the following census of 2011. The 2016 census measured the population of the rural district as 1,741 in 595 households. The most populous of its 58 villages was Hasanabad, with 935 people.
