= Robatat Rural District =

Rural district in Yazd province, Iran

Robatat Rural District Persian: دهستان رباطات
- Rural District
- Location within Iran
- Coordinates: 32°43′21″N 55°19′14″E
- Country: Iran
- Province: Yazd
- County: Ardakan
- District: Kharanaq
- Capital: Kharanaq

Population (2016)
  - Total: 4,113
- Time zone: UTC+3:30 (IRST)

Robatat Rural District (Persian: دهستان رباطات) is in Kharanaq District of Ardakan County, Yazd province, Iran. Its capital is the village of Kharanaq.

== Demographics ==
=== Population ===
At the time of the 2006 National Census, the rural district's population was 2,329 in 712 households. There were 4,431 inhabitants in 658 households at the following census of 2011. The 2016 census measured the population of the rural district as 4,113 in 737 households. The most populous of its 144 villages was Robat-e Posht-e Badam, with 770 people.
