= Zarrin Rural District (Ardakan County) =

Rural district in Yazd province, Iran

Zarrin Rural District Persian: دهستان زرين
- Rural District
- Location within Iran
- Coordinates: 32°49′31″N 54°42′22″E
- Country: Iran
- Province: Yazd
- County: Ardakan
- District: Kharanaq
- Capital: Tut

Population (2016)
  - Total: 553
- Time zone: UTC+3:30 (IRST)

Zarrin Rural District (Persian: دهستان زرين) is in Kharanaq District of Ardakan County, Yazd province, Iran. Its capital is the village of Tut.

== Demographics ==
=== Population ===
At the time of the 2006 National Census, the rural district's population was 866 in 289 households. There were 762 inhabitants in 206 households at the following census of 2011. The 2016 census measured the population of the rural district as 553 in 169 households. The most populous of its 64 villages was Hajjiabad-e Zarrin, with 178 people.
