= Aqda Rural District =

Rural district in Yazd province, Iran

Aqda Rural District Persian: دهستان عقدا
- Rural District
- Location within Iran
- Coordinates: 32°29′02″N 53°40′25″E
- Country: Iran
- Province: Yazd
- County: Ardakan
- District: Aqda
- Capital: Aqda

Population (2016)
  - Total: 3,221
- Time zone: UTC+3:30 (IRST)

Aqda Rural District (Persian: دهستان عقدا) is in Aqda District of Ardakan County, Yazd province, Iran. It is administered from the city of Aqda.

== Demographics ==
=== Population ===
At the time of the 2006 National Census, the rural district's population was 1,469 in 474 households. There were 3,798 inhabitants in 490 households at the following census of 2011. The 2016 census measured the population of the rural district as 3,221 in 449 households. The most populous of its 91 villages was Haftadar, with 404 people.
