= Kharanaq District =

District in Yazd province, Iran

Kharanaq District Persian: بخش خرانق
- District
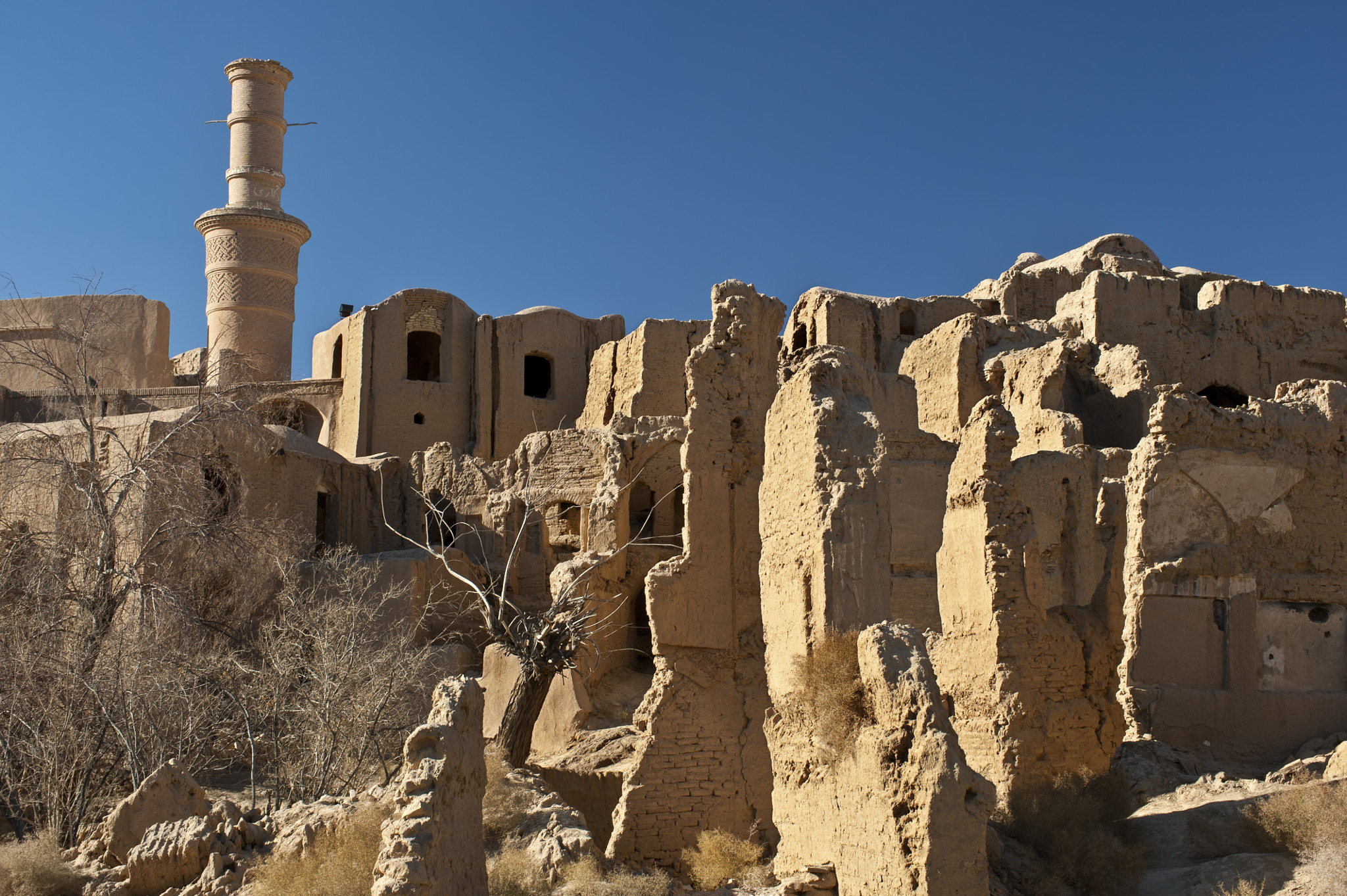
- Kharanaq

- Location within Iran
- Coordinates: 32°43′21″N 55°13′04″E
- Country: Iran
- Province: Yazd
- County: Ardakan
- Capital: Kharanaq

Population (2016)
  - Total: 4,666
- Time zone: UTC+3:30 (IRST)

Kharanaq District (Persian: بخش خرانق) is in Ardakan County, Yazd province, Iran. Its capital is the village of Kharanaq.

== Demographics ==
=== Population ===
At the time of the 2006 National Census, the district's population was 3,195 in 1,001 households. The following census in 2011 counted 5,193 people in 864 households. The 2016 census measured the population of the district as 4,666 inhabitants in 906 households.

=== Administrative divisions ===
Kharanaq District Population
Administrative Divisions	2006	2011	2016
Robatat RD	2,329	4,431	4,113
Zarrin RD	866	762	553
Total	3,195	5,193	4,666
RD = Rural District
