= Aqda District =

District in Yazd province, Iran

Aqda District Persian: بخش عقدا
- District
- Location within Iran
- Coordinates: 32°21′09″N 53°26′58″E
- Country: Iran
- Province: Yazd
- County: Ardakan
- Capital: Aqda

Population (2016)
  - Total: 6,716
- Time zone: UTC+3:30 (IRST)

Aqda District (Persian: بخش عقدا) is in Ardakan County, Yazd province, Iran. It capital is the city of Aqda.

== Demographics ==
=== Population ===
At the time of the 2006 National Census, the district's population was 4,578 in 1,387 households. The following census in 2011 counted 7,159 people in 1,569 households. The 2016 census measured the population of the district as 6,716 inhabitants in 1,646 households.

=== Administrative divisions ===
Aqda District Population
| Administrative Divisions | 2006 | 2011 | 2016 |
|---|---|---|---|
| Aqda RD | 1,469 | 3,798 | 3,221 |
| Narestan RD | 1,526 | 1,552 | 1,741 |
| Aqda (city) | 1,583 | 1,809 | 1,754 |
| Total | 4,578 | 7,159 | 6,716 |
RD = Rural District
