= Ardakan County =

County in Yazd province, Iran

Ardakan County Persian: شهرستان اردکان
- County
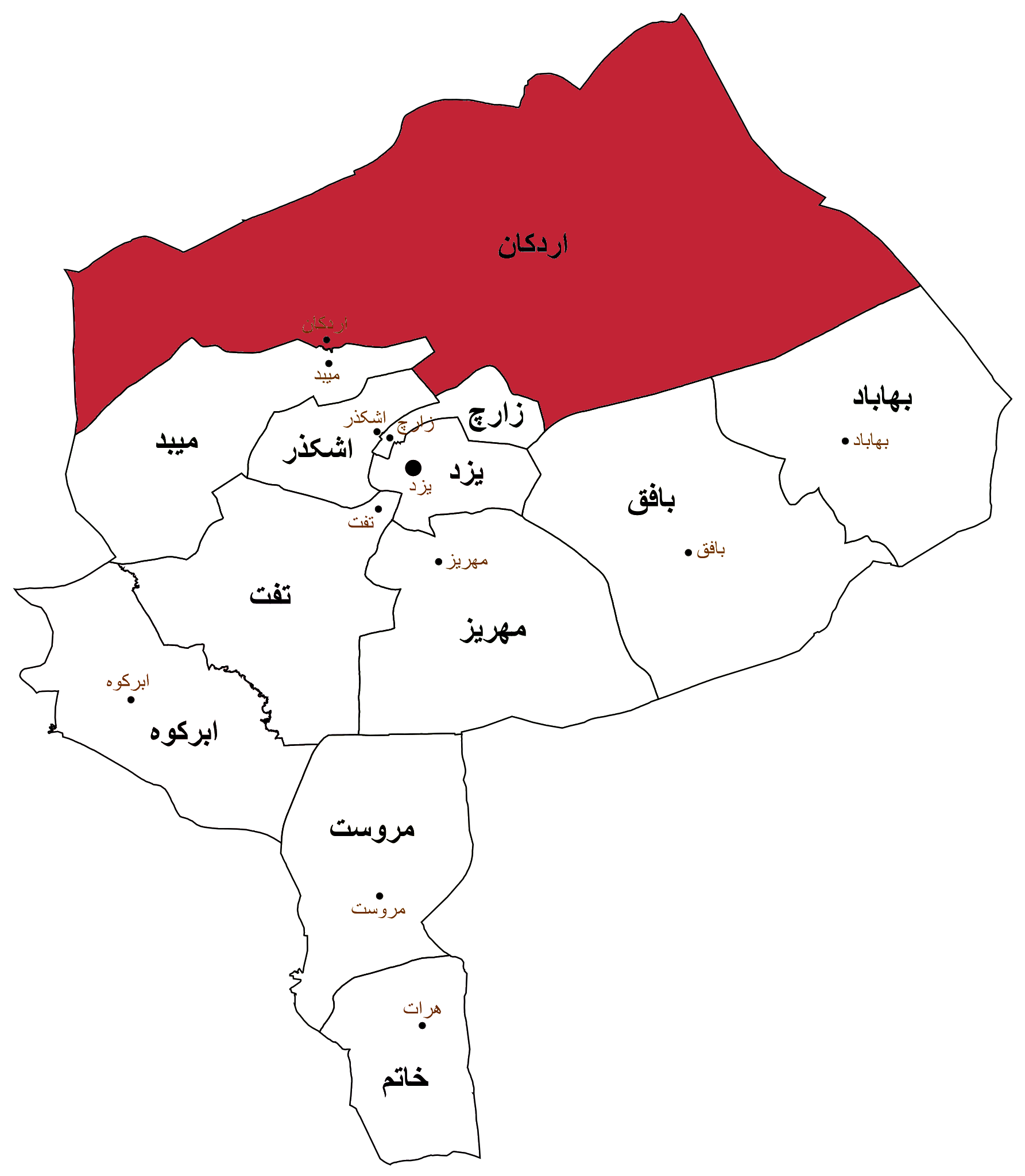
- Location of Ardakan County in Yazd province

- Location of Yazd province in Iran
- Coordinates: 32°41′N 54°41′E
- Country: Iran
- Province: Yazd
- Capital: Ardakan
- Districts: Central, Aqda, Kharanaq

Population (2016)
  - Total: 97,960
- Time zone: UTC+3:30 (IRST)

Ardakan County (Persian: شهرستان اردکان) is in Yazd province, Iran. Its capital is the city of Ardakan.

== Demographics ==
=== Population ===
At the time of the 2006 National Census, the county's population was 66,900 in 18,140 households. The following census in 2011 counted 77,758 people in 21,186 households. The 2016 census measured the population of the county as 97,960 in 28,216 households.

=== Administrative divisions ===
Ardakan County's population history and administrative structure over three consecutive censuses are shown in the following table.

Ardakan County Population
Administrative Divisions	2006	2011	2016
Central District	59,127	65,406	86,578
Mohammadiyeh RD	3,085	3,611	5,261
Ahmadabad (city)	4,693	5,019	6,046
Ardakan (city)	51,349	56,776	75,271
Aqda District	4,578	7,159	6,716
Aqda RD	1,469	3,798	3,221
Narestan RD	1,526	1,552	1,741
Aqda (city)	1,583	1,809	1,754
Kharanaq District	3,195	5,193	4,666
Robatat RD	2,329	4,431	4,113
Zarrin RD	866	762	553
Total	66,900	77,758	97,960
RD = Rural District

== Notable people ==
Mohammad Khatami (Former president of Iran) was born in Ardakan.

== See also ==
Media related to Ardakan County at Wikimedia Commons
