= Bandbon =

Bandbon or Band Bon or Band-e Bon (Persian: بندبن), also rendered as Bandbun, may refer to various places in Iran:

== Castle ==
- Bandbon castle

== Gilan Province ==
- Band-e Bon, Gilan
- Bandbon-e Bala, Gilan Province
- Bandbon-e Beneksar, Gilan Province
- Bandbon-e Pain, Gilan Province
- Bandbon-e Qasemabad, Gilan Province
- Bandbon-e Ujargah, Gilan Province

== Mazandaran Province ==
- Bandbon, Babol, Mazandaran Province
- Bandbon-e Kabud Tabar, Babol County, Mazandaran Province
- Band-e Bon, Neka, Mazandaran Province
- Band-e Bon, Sari, Mazandaran Province
- Band Bon, Tonekabon, Mazandaran Province
