= Lafmejan =

Lafmejan or Lafmajan (Persian: لفمجان), also rendered as Lafmujan or Lafmudzhan, may refer to:

- Bala Mahalleh-ye Lafmejan
- Pain Mahalleh-ye Lafmejan
- Lafmejan Rural District
