= Bijar Boneh =

Bijar Boneh (Persian: بيجاربنه) may refer to:

- Bijar Boneh, Lahijan
- Bijar Boneh-ye Bala, Lahijan County
- Bijar Boneh-ye Pain, Lahijan County
- Bijar Boneh, Rasht
