= Nakhjir Kolayeh =

Village in Gilan province, Iran

Nakhjir Kolayeh Persian: نخجيركلايه
- Village
- Location within Iran
- Coordinates: 37°12′43″N 50°02′11″E
- Country: Iran
- Province: Gilan
- County: Lahijan
- District: Central
- Rural District: Layalestan

Population (2016)
  - Total: 966
- Time zone: UTC+3:30 (IRST)

Nakhjir Kalayeh (Persian: نخجيركلايه) (Note: Also romanized as Nakhjīr Kolāyeh; also known as Naqsh Kalāyeh) is a village in Layalestan Rural District of the Central District in Lahijan County, Gilan province, Iran. The village is located north of Lahijan's city limits, between the city and the village of Bijar Boneh-ye Pain.

== Demographics ==
=== Population ===
At the time of the 2006 National Census, the village's population was 1,069 in 305 households. The following census in 2011 counted 880 people in 284 households. The 2016 census measured the population of the village as 966 people in 334 households.
