= Sadat Mahalleh, Ahandan =

Village in Gilan province, Iran

Sadat Mahalleh Persian: سادات محله
- Village
- Location within Iran
- Coordinates: 37°11′00″N 49°58′44″E
- Country: Iran
- Province: Gilan
- County: Lahijan
- District: Central
- Rural District: Ahandan

Population (2016)
  - Total: 1,058
- Time zone: UTC+3:30 (IRST)

Sadat Mahalleh (Persian: سادات محله) (Note: Also romanized as Sādāt Maḩalleh) is a village in Ahandan Rural District of the Central District in Lahijan County, Gilan province, Iran. The village, along with Bujayeh is located southwest of Lahijan's city limits.

== Demographics ==
=== Population ===
At the time of the 2006 National Census, the village's population was 862 in 225 households. The following census in 2011 counted 1,048 people in 321 households. The 2016 census measured the population of the village as 1,058 people in 346 households.
