= Gukeh =

Village in Gilan province, Iran

Gukeh Persian: گوكه
- Village
- Location within Iran
- Coordinates: 37°11′32″N 49°50′18″E
- Country: Iran
- Province: Gilan
- County: Lahijan
- District: Central
- Rural District: Lafmejan

Population (2016)
  - Total: 416
- Time zone: UTC+3:30 (IRST)

Gukeh (Persian: گوكه) (Note: Also romanized as Gūkeh) is a village in Lafmejan Rural District of the Central District in Lahijan County, Gilan province, in Iran.

== Demographics ==
=== Population ===
At the time of the 2006 National Census, the village's population was 651 in 222 households. The following census in 2011 counted 540 people in 190 households. The 2016 census measured the population of the village as 416 people in 163 households.
