= Kolangaran =

Village in Gilan province, Iran

Kolangaran Persian: كلنگران
- Village
- Location within Iran
- Coordinates: 37°11′37″N 49°52′58″E
- Country: Iran
- Province: Gilan
- County: Lahijan
- District: Central
- Rural District: Lafmejan

Population (2016)
  - Total: 212
- Time zone: UTC+3:30 (IRST)

Kolangaran (Persian: كلنگران) (Note: Also romanized as Kolangarān) is a village in Lafmejan Rural District of the Central District in Lahijan County, Gilan province, in Iran.

== Demographics ==
=== Population ===
At the time of the 2006 National Census, the village's population was 239 in 84 households. The following census in 2011 counted 262 people in 93 households. The 2016 census measured the population of the village as 212 people in 79 households.
