= Kateshal =

Kateshal or Katshal (Persian: كتشال), also rendered as Kateh Shal, may refer to:

- Kateshal-e Bala
- Kateshal-e Pain
