= Ali Sorud =

Village in Gilan province, Iran

Ali Sorud Persian: عليسرود
- Village
- Location within Iran
- Coordinates: 37°10′53″N 50°02′53″E
- Country: Iran
- Province: Gilan
- County: Lahijan
- District: Central
- Rural District: Layl

Population (2016)
  - Total: 217
- Time zone: UTC+3:30 (IRST)

Ali Sorud (Persian: عليسرود) (Note: Also romanized as ‘Alī Sorūd) is a village in Layl Rural District of the Central District in Lahijan County, Gilan province, Iran.

== Demographics ==
=== Population ===
At the time of the 2006 National Census, the village's population was 332 in 113 households. The following census in 2011 counted 274 people in 90 households. The 2016 census measured the population of the village as 217 people in 77 households.
