= Dozdaksu =

Dozdaksu دزدکسو
- Village
- Location within Iran
- Coordinates: 37°08′41″N 49°51′24″E
- Country: Iran
- Province: Gilan
- County: Lahijan
- Bakhsh: Central
- Rural District: Ahandan

Population (2016)
  - Total: 47
- Time zone: UTC+3:30 (IRST)

Dozdaksu (Persian: دزدکسو, also Romanized as Dozdaksū; also known as Dozdak) is a village in Ahandan Rural District, in the Central District of Lahijan County, Gilan Province, Iran.

At the time of the 2006 National Census, the village's population was 43 in 10 households. The following census in 2011 counted 34 people in 13 households. The 2016 census measured the population of the village as 47 people in 17 households.
