= Zemidan-e Bala =

Bala Mahelleh-ye Zemidan بالا محله زمیدان, زميدان بالا
- Village
- Interactive map of Bala Mahelleh-ye Zemidan
- Coordinates: 37.15°N 50.054°E
- Country: Iran
- Province: Gilan
- County: Lahijan
- Bakhsh: Central
- Rural District: Layl

Population (2016)
  - Total: 35
- Time zone: UTC+3:30 (IRST)

Bala Mahalleh-ye Zemidan (Persian: زميدان بالا, also known as Zemīdān-e Bālā) is a village in Layl Rural District, in the Central District of Lahijan County, Gilan Province, Iran.

At the time of the 2006 National Census, the village's population was 44 in 11 households. The following census in 2011 counted 43 people in 14 households. The 2016 census measured the population of the village as 35 people in 11 households.
