= Salehbar =

Salehbar صالح بر
- Village
- Interactive map of Salehbar
- Coordinates: 37.132°N 49.964°E
- Country: Iran
- Province: Gilan
- County: Lahijan
- Bakhsh: Central
- Rural District: Ahandan

Population (2016)
  - Total: 43
- Time zone: UTC+3:30 (IRST)

Salehbar (Persian: صالح بر, also Romanized as Şāleḩbar) is a village in Ahandan Rural District, in the Central District of Lahijan County, Gilan Province, Iran.

At the time of the 2006 National Census, the village's population was 76 in 20 households. The following census in 2011 counted 79 people in 23 households. The 2016 census measured the population of the village as 43 people in 18 households.
