= Sapahar Posht =

Sepehr Posht سپهرپشت
- Village
- Interactive map of Sepehr Posht
- Coordinates: 37.231°N 50.022°E
- Country: Iran
- Province: Gilan
- County: Lahijan
- Bakhsh: Central
- Rural District: Layalestan

Population (2016)
  - Total: 190
- Time zone: UTC+3:30 (IRST)

Sapahar Posht (Persian: سپهرپشت) is a village in Layalestan Rural District, in the Central District of Lahijan County, Gilan Province, Iran.

At the time of the 2006 National Census, the village's population was 241 in 79 households. The following census in 2011 counted 219 people in 75 households. The 2016 census measured the population of the village as 190 people in 72 households.
