= Bangebar =

Bangebar بنگبر
- Village
- Location within Iran
- Coordinates: 37°10′32″N 50°01′10″E
- Country: Iran
- Province: Gilan
- County: Lahijan
- Bakhsh: Central
- Rural District: Layl

Population (2016)
  - Total: 122
- Time zone: UTC+3:30 (IRST)

Bangebar (Persian: بنگبر; also known as Bangehvar) is a village in Layl Rural District, in the Central District of Lahijan County, Gilan Province, Iran.

At the time of the 2006 National Census, the village's population was 158 in 42 households. The following census in 2011 counted 145 people in 49 households. The 2016 census measured the population of the village as 122 people in 46 households.
