= Dizbon =

Village in Gilan province, Iran

Dizbon Persian: ديزبن
- Village
- Location within Iran
- Coordinates: 37°11′35″N 50°05′02″E
- Country: Iran
- Province: Gilan
- County: Lahijan
- District: Central
- Rural District: Layalestan

Population (2016)
  - Total: 1,064
- Time zone: UTC+3:30 (IRST)

Dizbon (Persian: ديزبن) (Note: Also romanized as Dīzbon) is a village in Layalestan Rural District of the Central District in Lahijan County, Gilan province, Iran.

== Demographics ==
=== Population ===
At the time of the 2006 National Census, the village's population was 1,290 in 352 households. The following census in 2011 counted 1,241 people in 388 households. The 2016 census measured the population of the village as 1,064 people in 364 households.
