= Kureh, Gilan =

Kureh كوره
- Village
- Location within Iran
- Coordinates: 37°08′05″N 50°04′42″E
- Country: Iran
- Province: Gilan
- County: Lahijan
- Bakhsh: Central
- Rural District: Layl

Population (2016)
  - Total: 99
- Time zone: UTC+3:30 (IRST)

Kureh (Persian: كوره, also Romanized as Kūreh) is a village in Layl Rural District, in the Central District of Lahijan County, Gilan Province, Iran.

At the time of the 2006 National Census, the village's population was 154 in 48 households. The following census in 2011 counted 130 people in 45 households. The 2016 census measured the population of the village as 99 people in 42 households.
