= Chamandan =

Chamandan چمندان
- Village
- Location within Iran
- Coordinates: 37°10′33″N 49°57′52″E
- Country: Iran
- Province: Gilan
- County: Lahijan
- Bakhsh: Central
- Rural District: Ahandan

Population (2016)
  - Total: 99
- Time zone: UTC+3:30 (IRST)

Chamandan (Persian: چمندان, also romanized as Chamandān) is a village in Ahandan Rural District, in the Central District of Lahijan County, Gilan Province, Iran.

At the time of the 2006 National Census, the village's population was 168. The following census in 2011 counted 135 people in 47 households. The 2016 census measured the population of the village as 99 people in 42 households.
