= Mishkasar =

Mishkasar ميشكاسر
- Village
- Interactive map of Mishkasar
- Coordinates: 37.16°N 50.071°E
- Country: Iran
- Province: Gilan
- County: Lahijan
- Bakhsh: Central
- Rural District: Layl

Population (2016)
  - Total: 18
- Time zone: UTC+3:30 (IRST)

Mishkasar (Persian: ميشكاسر, also Romanized as Mīshkāsar) is a village in Layl Rural District, in the Central District of Lahijan County, Gilan Province, Iran.

At the time of the 2006 National Census, the village's population was 37 in nine households. The following census in 2011 counted 30 people in 10 households. The 2016 census measured the population of the village as 18 people in six households.
