= Kord Mahalleh, Lahijan =

Kord Mahalleh كردمحله
- Village
- Location within Iran
- Coordinates: 37°10′21″N 49°47′11″E
- Country: Iran
- Province: Gilan
- County: Lahijan
- Bakhsh: Central
- Rural District: Lafmejan

Population (2016)
  - Total: 76
- Time zone: UTC+3:30 (IRST)

Kord Mahalleh (Persian: كردمحله, also Romanized as Kord Maḩalleh) is a village in Lafmejan Rural District, in the Central District of Lahijan County, Gilan Province, Iran. At the 2016 census, its population was 76, in 25 families. Down from 94 people in 2006.
