= Layalestan =

Village in Gilan province, Iran

Layalestan Persian: ليالستان
- Village
- Location within Iran
- Coordinates: 37°12′14″N 50°04′15″E
- Country: Iran
- Province: Gilan
- County: Lahijan
- District: Central
- Rural District: Layalestan

Population (2016)
  - Total: 1,601
- Time zone: UTC+3:30 (IRST)

Layalestan (Persian: ليالستان) (Note: Also romanized as Layālestān, Līālestān, and Līyālestān; also known as Leyarestān, Līārestān, and Līyarestān) is a village in, and the capital of, Layalestan Rural District in the Central District of Lahijan County, Gilan province, Iran.

== Demographics ==
=== Population ===
At the time of the 2006 National Census, the village's population was 1,851 in 558 households. The following census in 2011 counted 1,831 people in 597 households. The 2016 census measured the population of the village as 1,601 people in 616 households.
