= Alaki Sahra =

Alaki Sahra الکی صحرا
- Village
- Location within Iran
- Coordinates: 37°12′42″N 50°04′35″E
- Country: Iran
- Province: Gilan
- County: Lahijan
- Bakhsh: Central
- Rural District: Layalestan

Population (2016)
  - Total: 76
- Time zone: UTC+3:30 (IRST)

Alaki Sahra (Persian: الکی صحرا, also Romanized as Ālakī Şaḩrā; also known as Ālakīmaḩalleh) is a village in Layalestan Rural District, in the Central District of Lahijan County, Gilan Province, Iran.

At the time of the 2006 National Census, the village's population was 75 in 26 households. The following census in 2011 counted 89 people in 29 households. The 2016 census measured the population of the village as 76 people in 30 households.
