= Sustan =

Village in Gilan province, Iran

Sustan سوستان
- Village
- Location within Iran
- Coordinates: 37°10′52″N 50°00′20″E
- Country: Iran
- Province: Gilan
- County: Lahijan
- District: Central
- Rural District: Layl

Population (2016)
  - Total: 2,336
- Time zone: UTC+3:30 (IRST)

Sustan (Persian and Gilaki: سوستان) (Note: Also romanized as Sūstān; also known as Sīstān) is a village in Layl Rural District of the Central District in Lahijan County, Gilan province, Iran.

== Demographics ==
=== Population ===
At the time of the 2006 National Census, the village's population was 4,341 in 1,229 households. The following census in 2011 counted 2,069 people in 647 households, with parts of the village annexed to Lahijan's urban area. The 2016 census measured the population of the village as 2,336 people in 777 households. It was the most populous village in its rural district.
