= Lamak Mahalleh-ye Lafmejan =

Lamak Mahalleh-ye Lafmejan لمک محله لفمجان
- Village
- Interactive map of Lamak Mahalleh-ye Lafmejan
- Coordinates: 37°12′48.83″N 49°52′40.14″E
- Country: Iran
- Province: Gilan
- County: Lahijan
- Bakhsh: Central
- Rural District: Lafmejan

Population (2016)
  - Total: 95
- Time zone: UTC+3:30 (IRST)

Lamak Mahalleh-ye Lafmejan (Persian: لمك محله لفمجان, also Romanized as Lamak Maḩalleh-ye Lafmejān) also called Labak Mahalleh-ye Lafmejan is a village in Lafmejan Rural District, in the Central District of Lahijan County, Gilan Province, Iran. At the 2016 census, its population was 95, in 44 families. Down from 140 people in 2006.
