= Lashidan-e Motlaq =

Village in Gilan province, Iran

Lashidan-e Motlaq Persian: لاشيدان مطلق
- Village, Suburb
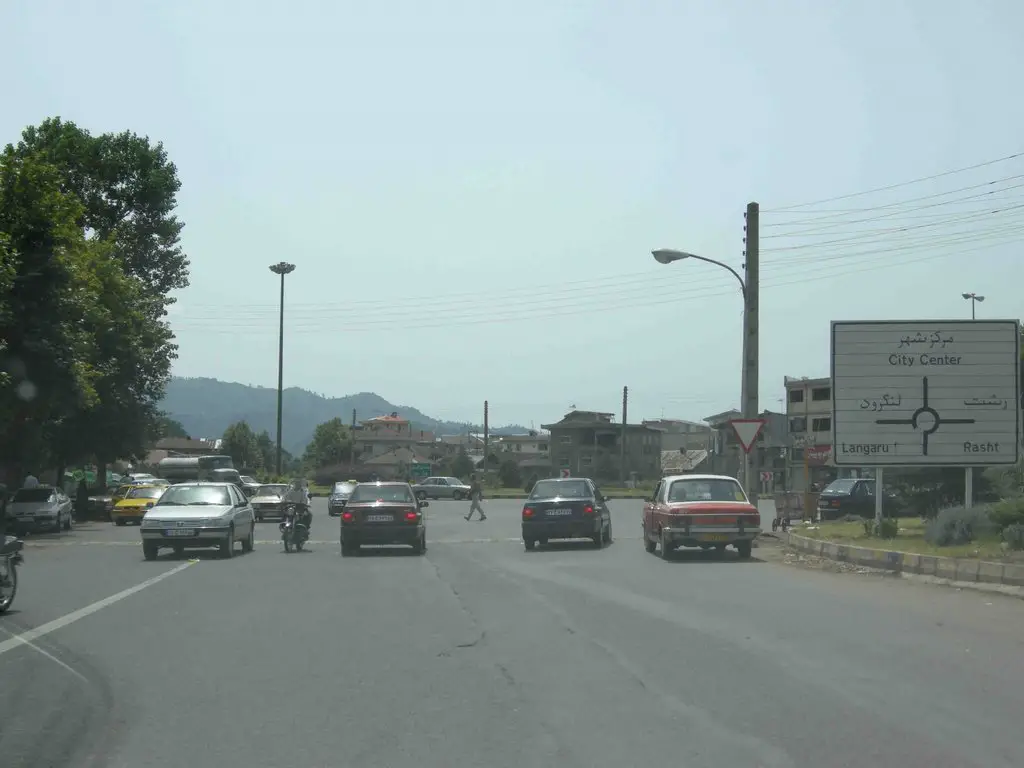
- The village of Lashidan-e Motlaq

- Location within Iran
- Coordinates: 37°13′18″N 49°59′57″E
- Country: Iran
- Province: Gilan
- County: Lahijan
- District: Central
- Rural District: Layalestan

Population (2016)
  - Total: 0
- Time zone: UTC+3:30 (IRST)

Lashidan-e Motlaq (Persian: لاشيدان مطلق) (Note: Also romanized as Lāshīdān-e Moţlaq) is a northern suburb of Lahijan city and a village in Layalestan Rural District of the Central District in Lahijan County, Gilan province, Iran. It is north of the city's ring road.

== Demographics ==
=== Population ===
At the time of the 2006 National Census, the village's population was 2,647 in 734 households, when it was in Rudboneh Rural District of Rudboneh District. The following census in 2011 counted 3,083 people in 947 households, by which time the village had been transferred to Layalestan Rural District of the Central District. The 2016 census measured the population of the village as zero, as the residential area of the village was incorporated into Lahijan city's urban area.
