= Lahash =

Lahash may refer to:

- Lahash, Iran, in Mazandaran Province, Iran
- Lahash, Gilan, in Gilan Province, Iran
- A Christian ministry Lahash International
