= Golkesh =

Golkesh گلكش
- Village
- Interactive map of Golkesh
- Coordinates: 37.127°N 50.047°E
- Country: Iran
- Province: Gilan
- County: Lahijan
- Bakhsh: Central
- Rural District: Layl

Population (2016)
  - Total: 87
- Time zone: UTC+3:30 (IRST)

Golkesh (Persian: گلكش) is a village in Layl Rural District, in the Central District of Lahijan County, Gilan Province, Iran.

At the time of the 2006 National Census, the village's population was 108 in 26 households. The following census in 2011 counted 102 people in 30 households. The 2016 census measured the population of the village as 87 people in 26 households.
