= Molla Mahalleh-ye Chehel Setun =

Molla Mahalleh-ye Chehel Setun ملامحله چهل ستون
- Village
- Location within Iran
- Coordinates: 37°08′51″N 49°57′28″E
- Country: Iran
- Province: Gilan
- County: Lahijan
- Bakhsh: Central
- Rural District: Ahandan

Population (2016)
  - Total: 84
- Time zone: UTC+3:30 (IRST)

Molla Mahalleh-ye Chehel Setun (Persian: ملامحله چهل ستون, also Romanized as Mollā Maḩalleh-ye Chehel Setūn; also known as Chehel Setūn) is a village in Ahandan Rural District, in the Central District of Lahijan County, Gilan Province, Iran.

At the time of the 2006 National Census, the village's population was 84 in 23 households. The following census in 2011 counted 90 people in 30 households. The 2016 census measured the population of the village as 84 people in 31 households.
