= Jowpish =

Jowpish جوپيش
- Village
- Location within Iran
- Coordinates: 37°12′22″N 49°53′09″E
- Country: Iran
- Province: Gilan
- County: Lahijan
- Bakhsh: Central
- Rural District: Lafmejan

Population (2016)
  - Total: 151
- Time zone: UTC+3:30 (IRST)

Jowpish (Persian: جوپيش, also Romanized as Jowpīsh; also known as Jopīsh) is a village in Lafmejan Rural District, in the Central District of Lahijan County, Gilan Province, Iran. At the 2016 census, its population was 151, in 56 families. Down from 184 in 2006.
