= Tamushal =

Tamushal (Persian: تموشل) may refer to:

- Bala Tamushal
- Pain Tamushal
