= Kureh Bar =

Village in Gilan province, Iran

Kureh Bar Persian: كوره بر
- Village
- Location within Iran
- Coordinates: 37°09′17″N 50°00′24″E
- Country: Iran
- Province: Gilan
- County: Lahijan
- District: Central
- Rural District: Ahandan

Population (2016)
  - Total: 212
- Time zone: UTC+3:30 (IRST)

Kureh Bar (Persian: كوره بر) (Note: Also romanized as Kūreh Bar and Kūrehbar) is a village in Ahandan Rural District of the Central District in Lahijan County, Gilan province, Iran.

== Demographics ==
=== Population ===
At the time of the 2006 National Census, the village's population was 216 in 59 households. The following census in 2011 counted 235 people in 74 households. The 2016 census measured the population of the village as 212 people in 68 households.
