= Siah Gurab =

Siah Gurab (Persian: سياهگوراب), also known as Siah Qorab or Siyah Gowdab or Seyah Qorab, may refer to:

- Siah Gurab-e Bala
- Siah Gurab-e Pain
