= Kuh Boneh =

Village in Gilan province, Iran

Kuh Boneh Persian: كوه بنه
- Village
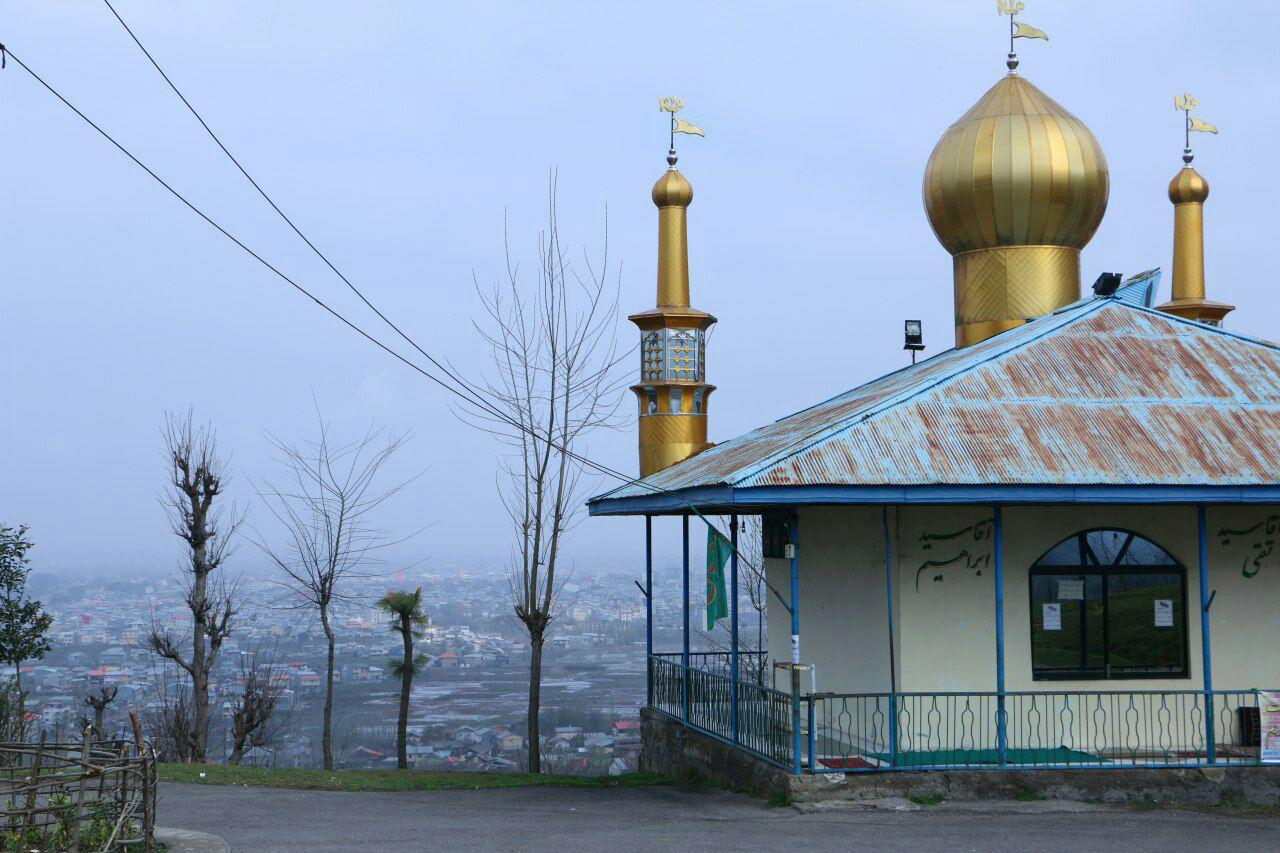

- Location within Iran
- Coordinates: 37°11′08″N 49°59′34″E
- Country: Iran
- Province: Gilan
- County: Lahijan
- District: Central
- Rural District: Ahandan

Population (2016)
  - Total: 1,630
- Time zone: UTC+3:30 (IRST)

Kuh Boneh (Persian: كوه بنه) (Note: Also romanized as Kooh Boneh and Kūh Boneh; also known as Kouhbane) is a village in Ahandan Rural District of the Central District in Lahijan County, Gilan province, Iran. Most villagers are engaged in agriculture, especially the cultivation of tea and rice.

== Demographics ==
People of Kuh Boneh speak Gilaki and Persian languages. Their agricultural products are rice, tea and silk.

Kuh Boneh Population history
Year	Pop.	±%
1950	331	—
1956	457	+38.1%
1966	684	+49.7%
1986	908	+32.7%
2006	1,453	+60.0%
2011	1,314	−9.6%
2016	1,630	+24.0%

=== Population ===
The 1966 census measured a population of 684 people in 126 households. At the time of the 1986 census, Kuh Boneh had 908 people in 180 households. The village had schools, post service, and electricity but it did not have tap water.

At the time of the 2006 National Census, the village's population was 1,453 in 398 households. The following census in 2011 counted 1,314 people in 414 households. The 2016 census measured the population of the village as 1,630 people in 556 households. It was the most populous village in its rural district.
