= Dangayeh =

Dangayeh دانگايه
- Village
- Location within Iran
- Coordinates: 37°07′17″N 50°03′56″E
- Country: Iran
- Province: Gilan
- County: Lahijan
- Bakhsh: Central
- Rural District: Layl

Population (2016)
  - Total: 127
- Time zone: UTC+3:30 (IRST)

Dangayeh (Persian: دانگايه, also Romanized as Dāngāyeh) is a village in Layl Rural District, in the Central District of Lahijan County, Gilan Province, Iran.

At the time of the 2006 National Census, the village's population was 185 in 56 households. The following census in 2011 counted 156 people in 58 households. The 2016 census measured the population of the village as 127 people in 49 households.
