= Chichini Kuti =

Chichini Kuti چی چی نی کوتی
- Village
- Interactive map of Chichini Kuti
- Coordinates: 37.127°N 49.977°E
- Country: Iran
- Province: Gilan
- County: Lahijan
- Bakhsh: Central
- Rural District: Ahandan

Population (2016)
  - Total: 128
- Time zone: UTC+3:30 (IRST)

Chichini Kuti (Persian: چیچینی کوتی, also Romanized as Chīchīnī Kūtī) is a village in Ahandan Rural District, in the Central District of Lahijan County, Gilan Province, Iran.

At the time of the 2006 National Census, the village's population was 174 in 45 households. The following census in 2011 counted 144 people in 54 households. The 2016 census measured the population of the village as 128 people in 51 households.
