= Kuchek Deh =

Kuchek Deh كوچكده
- Village
- Location within Iran
- Coordinates: 37°14′14″N 50°04′48″E
- Country: Iran
- Province: Gilan
- County: Lahijan
- Bakhsh: Central
- Rural District: Layalestan

Population (2016)
  - Total: 151
- Time zone: UTC+3:30 (IRST)

Kuchek Deh (Persian: كوچكده, also Romanized as Kūchek Deh) is a village in Layalestan Rural District, in the Central District of Lahijan County, Gilan Province, Iran.

At the time of the 2006 National Census, the village's population was 240 in 90 households. The following census in 2011 counted 212 people in 73 households. The 2016 census measured the population of the village as 151 people in 64 households.
