= Gerd Geraf =

Gerd Geraf گردگرف
- Village
- Location within Iran
- Coordinates: 37°08′13″N 50°03′15″E
- Country: Iran
- Province: Gilan
- County: Lahijan
- Bakhsh: Central
- Rural District: Layl

Population (2016)
  - Total: 71
- Time zone: UTC+3:30 (IRST)

Gerd Geraf (Persian: گردگرف; also known as Jirfidreh) is a village in Layl Rural District, in the Central District of Lahijan County, Gilan Province, Iran.

At the time of the 2006 National Census, the village's population was 73 in 21 households. The following census in 2011 counted 76 people in 24 households. The 2016 census measured the population of the village as 71 people in 23 households.
