= Sarash =

Sarash سراش
- Village
- Location within Iran
- Coordinates: 37°06′58″N 50°02′48″E
- Country: Iran
- Province: Gilan
- County: Lahijan
- Bakhsh: Central
- Rural District: Layl

Population (2016)
  - Total: 85
- Time zone: UTC+3:30 (IRST)

Sarash (Persian: سراش, also Romanized as Sarāsh) is a village in Layl Rural District, in the Central District of Lahijan County, Gilan Province, Iran.

At the time of the 2006 National Census, the village's population was 138. The following census in 2011 counted 120 people in 33 households. The 2016 census measured the population of the village as 85 people in 28 households.
