= Khurtay =

Khurtay خورتای
- Village
- Interactive map of Khurtay
- Coordinates: 37.125°N 50.001°E
- Country: Iran
- Province: Gilan
- County: Lahijan
- Bakhsh: Central
- Rural District: Ahandan

Population (2016)
  - Total: 87
- Time zone: UTC+3:30 (IRST)

Khurtay (Persian: خورتای, also Romanized as Khūrtāy) is a village in Ahandan Rural District, in the Central District of Lahijan County, Gilan Province, Iran.

At the time of the 2006 National Census, the village's population was 121 in 29 households. The following census in 2011 counted 114 people in 31 households. The 2016 census measured the population of the village as 87 people in 32 households.
