= Qassab Mahalleh, Lahijan =

Village in Gilan province, Iran

Qassab Mahalleh Persian: قصابمحله
- Village
- Location within Iran
- Coordinates: 37°12′40″N 50°03′31″E
- Country: Iran
- Province: Gilan
- County: Lahijan
- District: Central
- Rural District: Layalestan

Population (2016)
  - Total: 377
- Time zone: UTC+3:30 (IRST)

Qassab Mahalleh (Persian: قصابمحله) (Note: Also romanized as Qaşşāb Maḩalleh; also known as Qaşşāb Deh) is a village in Layalestan Rural District of the Central District in Lahijan County, Gilan province, Iran.

== Demographics ==
=== Population ===
At the time of the 2006 National Census, the village's population was 512 in 153 households. The following census in 2011 counted 414 people in 148 households. The 2016 census measured the population of the village as 377 people in 151 households.
