= Bazar Deh =

Bazar Deh بازارده
- Village
- Location within Iran
- Coordinates: 37°12′14″N 49°50′28″E
- Country: Iran
- Province: Gilan
- County: Lahijan
- Bakhsh: Central
- Rural District: Lafmejan

Population (2016)
  - Total: 70
- Time zone: UTC+3:30 (IRST)

Bazar Deh (Persian: بازارده, also Romanized as Bāzār Deh) is a village in Lafmejan Rural District, in the Central District of Lahijan County, Gilan Province, Iran. At the 2006 census, its population was 83, in 31 families. In 2016, its population was 70 people in 33 households.
