= Gurandan =

Gurandan (Persian: گوراندان) may refer to:

- Gurandan, Gilan
- Gurandan, Hormozgan
