= Azarestan =

Azarestan آزارستان
- Village
- Location within Iran
- Coordinates: 37°09′41″N 49°59′34″E
- Country: Iran
- Province: Gilan
- County: Lahijan
- Bakhsh: Central
- Elevation: 200 m (660 ft)

Population (2016)
  - Total: 94
- Time zone: UTC+3:30 (IRST)

Azarestan (Persian: آزارستان, also Romanized as Āzārestān) is a village in Ahandan Rural District, in the Central District of Lahijan County, Gilan Province, Iran.

At the time of the 2006 National Census, the village's population was 164 in 49 households. The following census in 2011 counted 120 people in 45 households. The 2016 census measured the population of the village as 94 people in 41 households.
