= Tusowdasht =

Tusowdasht توساودشت
- Village
- Interactive map of Tusowdasht
- Coordinates: 37.1128°N 50.0196°E
- Country: Iran
- Province: Gilan
- County: Lahijan
- Bakhsh: Central
- Rural District: Layl

Population (2016)
  - Total: 34
- Time zone: UTC+3:30 (IRST)

Tusowdasht (Persian: توساودشت, also Romanized as Tūsowdasht) also known as Tusadasht, is a village in Layl Rural District, in the Central District of Lahijan County, Gilan Province, Iran.

At the time of the 2006 National Census, the village's population was 60 in 15 households. The following census in 2011 counted 49 people in 14 households. The 2016 census measured the population of the village as 34 people in 13 households.
