= Khubdeh =

Khubdeh خوبده
- Village
- Location within Iran
- Coordinates: 37°11′27″N 49°52′56″E
- Country: Iran
- Province: Gilan
- County: Lahijan
- Bakhsh: Central
- Rural District: Lafmejan

Population (2016)
  - Total: 135
- Time zone: UTC+3:30 (IRST)

Khubdeh (Persian: خوبده, also Romanized as Khūbdeh) is a village in Lafmejan Rural District, in the Central District of Lahijan County, Gilan Province, Iran. At the 2016 census, its population was 135, in 54 families. Down from 198 people in 2006.
