= Sukhteh Kuh, Lahijan =

Village in Gilan province, Iran

Sukhteh Kuh Persian: سوخته كوه
- Village
- Location within Iran
- Coordinates: 37°09′42″N 49°57′50″E
- Country: Iran
- Province: Gilan
- County: Lahijan
- District: Central
- Rural District: Ahandan

Population (2016)
  - Total: 271
- Time zone: UTC+3:30 (IRST)

Sukhteh Kuh (Persian: سوخته كوه) (Note: Also romanized as Sūkhteh Kūh; also known as Sūkhtkūh) is a village in Ahandan Rural District of the Central District in Lahijan County, Gilan province, Iran.

== Demographics ==
=== Population ===
At the time of the 2006 National Census, the village's population was 340 in 92 households. The following census in 2011 counted 260 people in 83 households. The 2016 census measured the population of the village as 271 people in 105 households.
