= Pain Mahalleh-ye Zemidan =

Village in Gilan province, Iran

Pain Mahalleh-ye Zemidan Persian: پائين محله زميدان
- Village
- Location within Iran
- Coordinates: 37°09′52″N 50°03′00″E
- Country: Iran
- Province: Gilan
- County: Lahijan
- District: Central
- Rural District: Layl

Population (2016)
  - Total: 246
- Time zone: UTC+3:30 (IRST)

Pain Mahalleh-ye Zemidan (Persian: پائين محله زميدان) (Note: Also romanized as Pā’īn Maḩalleh-ye Zemīdān) is a village in Layl Rural District of the Central District in Lahijan County, Gilan province, Iran.

== Demographics ==
=== Population ===
At the time of the 2006 National Census, the village's population was 286 in 79 households. The following census in 2011 counted 331 people in 97 households. The 2016 census measured the population of the village as 246 people in 79 households.
