= Pain Gomol =

Village in Gilan province, Iran

Pain Gomol Persian: پائين گمل
- Village
- Location within Iran
- Coordinates: 37°07′41″N 50°01′43″E
- Country: Iran
- Province: Gilan
- County: Lahijan
- District: Central
- Rural District: Layl

Population (2016)
  - Total: 213
- Time zone: UTC+3:30 (IRST)

Pain Gomol (Persian: پائين گمل) (Note: Also romanized as Pā’īn Gomol) is a village in Layl Rural District of the Central District in Lahijan County, Gilan province, Iran.

== Demographics ==
=== Population ===
At the time of the 2006 National Census, the village's population was 267 in 64 households. The following census in 2011 counted 248 people in 67 households. The 2016 census measured the population of the village as 213 people in 66 households.
