= Nowbijar =

Nowbijar نوبيجار
- Village
- Location within Iran
- Coordinates: 37°14′12″N 50°01′15″E
- Country: Iran
- Province: Gilan
- County: Lahijan
- Bakhsh: Central
- Rural District: Layalestan

Population (2016)
  - Total: 282
- Time zone: UTC+3:30 (IRST)

Nowbijar (Persian: نوبيجار, also Romanized as Nowbījār) is a village in Layalestan Rural District, in the Central District of Lahijan County, Gilan Province, Iran.

At the time of the 2006 National Census, the village's population was 360 in 109 households. The following census in 2011 counted 340 people in 118 households. The 2016 census measured the population of the village as 282 people in 109 households.
