= Gomol Sara =

Gomol Sara گمل سرا
- Village
- Location within Iran
- Coordinates: 37°07′41″N 50°01′44″E
- Country: Iran
- Province: Gilan
- County: Lahijan
- Bakhsh: Central
- Rural District: Layl

Population (2016)
  - Total: 33
- Time zone: UTC+3:30 (IRST)

Gomol Sara (Persian: گمل سرا, also Romanized as Gomol Sarā) is a village in Layl Rural District, in the Central District of Lahijan County, Gilan Province, Iran.

At the time of the 2006 National Census, the village's population was 63 in 17 households. The following census in 2011 counted 53 people in 15 households. The 2016 census measured the population of the village as 33 people in 10 households.
