= Ahandan =

Village in Gilan province, Iran

Ahandan Persian: آهندان
- Village
- Location within Iran
- Coordinates: 37°10′31″N 49°59′04″E
- Country: Iran
- Province: Gilan
- County: Lahijan
- District: Central
- Rural District: Ahandan

Population (2016)
  - Total: 1,031
- Time zone: UTC+3:30 (IRST)

Ahandan (Persian: آهندان) (Note: Also romanized as Āhandān) is a village in, and the capital of, Ahandan Rural District in the Central District of Lahijan County, Gilan province, Iran.

== Demographics ==
=== Population ===
At the time of the 2006 National Census, the village's population was 1,056 in 302 households. The following census in 2011 counted 1,071 people in 345 households. The 2016 census measured the population of the village as 1,031 people in 374 households.
