= Fidarreh =

Fidarreh (Persian: فيدره), also rendered as Fudarreh and Fedreh, may refer to:

- Bala Fidarreh
- Pain Fidarreh
