= Sattarabad =

Village in Iran

Sattarabad ستارآباد
- Village
- Location within Iran
- Coordinates: 37°08′28″N 50°04′47″E
- Country: Iran
- Province: Gilan
- County: Lahijan
- Bakhsh: Central
- Rural District: Layl

Population (2016)
  - Total: 36
- Time zone: UTC+3:30 (IRST)

Sattarabad (Persian: ستارآباد, also Romanized as Sattārābād) is a village in Layl Rural District, in the Central District of Lahijan County, Gilan Province, Iran.

At the time of the 2006 National Census, the village's population was 51 in 16 households. The following census in 2011 counted 59 people in 18 households. The 2016 census measured the population of the village as 36 people in 12 households.
