= Shirin Nesa =

Shirin Nesa شيرين نسا
- Village
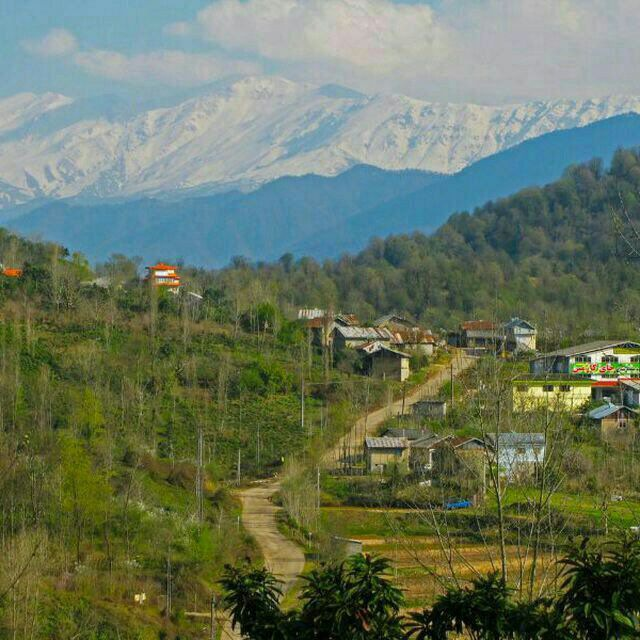

- Location within Iran
- Coordinates: 37°08′30″N 50°04′21″E
- Country: Iran
- Province: Gilan
- County: Lahijan
- Bakhsh: Central
- Rural District: Layl

Population (2016)
  - Total: 177
- Time zone: UTC+3:30 (IRST)

Shirin Nesa (Persian: شيرين نسا, also Romanized as Shīrīn Nesā; also known as Shīrnesā, Shir Nesā, and Shīrnesā’) is a village in Layl Rural District, in the Central District of Lahijan County, Gilan Province, Iran. At the 2016 census, its population was 177, in 68 families.
