= Lialeman =

Village in Gilan province, Iran

Lialeman Persian: ليالمان
- Village
- Location within Iran
- Coordinates: 37°10′00″N 49°58′31″E
- Country: Iran
- Province: Gilan
- County: Lahijan
- District: Central
- Rural District: Ahandan

Population (2016)
  - Total: 719
- Time zone: UTC+3:30 (IRST)

Lialeman (Persian: ليالمان) (Note: Also romanized as Līālemān) is a village in Ahandan Rural District of the Central District in Lahijan County, Gilan province, Iran.

== Demographics ==
=== Population ===
At the time of the 2006 National Census, the village's population was 819 in 223 households. The following census in 2011 counted 854 people in 286 households. The 2016 census measured the population of the village as 719 people in 268 households.
