= Sheykhanbar =

Sheykhanbar شيخانبر
- Village, Suburb
- Location within Iran
- Coordinates: 37°12′13″N 50°02′47″E
- Country: Iran
- Province: Gilan
- County: Lahijan
- Bakhsh: Central
- Rural District: Layalestan

Population (2011)
  - Total: 871
- Time zone: UTC+3:30 (IRST)

Sheykhanbar (Persian: شيخانبر, also Romanized as Sheykhānbar; also known as Sheikhaneh Sar and Sheykhānehvar) is an eastern suburb of Lahijan city. and a village in Layalestan Rural District, in the Central District of Lahijan County, Gilan Province, Iran.

Its population was 110, in 40 families at the time of 2016 census., down from 871 people in 2011, as parts of the residential area was annexed to Lahijan's urban area.
