= Chahar Khaneh Sar =

Chahar Khaneh Sar (Persian: چهارخانه سر) may refer to:

- Chahar Khaneh Sar-e Bala
- Chahar Khaneh Sar-e Pain
