= Khortab, Lahijan =

Khortab خرتاب
- Village
- Interactive map of Khortab
- Coordinates: 37.133°N 49.944°E
- Country: Iran
- Province: Gilan
- County: Lahijan
- Bakhsh: Central
- Rural District: Ahandan

Population (2016)
  - Total: 10
- Time zone: UTC+3:30 (IRST)

Khortab (Persian: خرتاب, also Romanized as Khortāb) is a village in Ahandan Rural District, in the Central District of Lahijan County, Gilan Province, Iran.

At the time of the 2006 National Census, the village's population was 71 in 24 households. The following census in 2011 counted 59 people in 21 households. The 2016 census measured the population of the village as 10 people in 4 households.
