= Bazarsar-e Lafmejan =

Village in Gilan province, Iran

Bazarsar-e Lafmejan Persian: بازارسر لفمجان
- Village
- Location within Iran
- Coordinates: 37°11′35″N 49°52′32″E
- Country: Iran
- Province: Gilan
- County: Lahijan
- District: Central
- Rural District: Lafmejan

Population (2016)
  - Total: 204
- Time zone: UTC+3:30 (IRST)

Bazarsar-e Lafmejan (Persian: بازارسر لفمجان) (Note: Also romanized as Bāzārsar-e Lafmejān) is a village in, and the capital of, Lafmejan Rural District in the Central District of Lahijan County, Gilan province, Iran.

== Demographics ==
=== Population ===
At the time of the 2006 National Census, the village's population was 382 in 130 households. The following census in 2011 counted 341 people in 123 households. The 2016 census measured the population of the village as 204 people in 81 households.
