= Bilazh Mahalleh =

Bilazh Mahalleh بيلاژمحله
- Village
- Interactive map of Bilazh Mahalleh
- Coordinates: 37.161°N 50.006°E
- Country: Iran
- Province: Gilan
- County: Lahijan
- Bakhsh: Central
- Rural District: Ahandan

Population (2016)
  - Total: 62
- Time zone: UTC+3:30 (IRST)

Bilazh Mahalleh (Persian: بيلاژمحله, also Romanized as Bīlāzh Maḩalleh) is a village in Ahandan Rural District, in the Central District of Lahijan County, Gilan Province, Iran.

At the time of the 2006 National Census, the village's population was 60 in 22 households. The following census in 2011 counted 66 people in 22 households. The 2016 census measured the population of the village as 62 people in 22 households.
