= Kord Gavar =

Kord Gavar كردگاور
- Village
- Location within Iran
- Coordinates: 37°10′02″N 50°04′31″E
- Country: Iran
- Province: Gilan
- County: Lahijan
- Bakhsh: Central
- Rural District: Layl

Population (2016)
  - Total: 158
- Time zone: UTC+3:30 (IRST)

Kord Gavar (Persian: كردگاور, also Romanized as Kord Gāvar; also known as Kord Gavābar) is a village in Layl Rural District, in the Central District of Lahijan County, Gilan Province, Iran.

At the time of the 2006 National Census, the village's population was 150 in 44 households. The following census in 2011 counted 152 people in 47 households. The 2016 census measured the population of the village as 158 people in 50 households.
