= Bijar Ankish =

Bijar Ankish (Persian: بيجارانكيش) may refer to:

- Bala Bijar Ankish
- Pain Bijar Ankish
