= Kuhbijar =

Kuhbijar كوه بيجار
- Village
- Location within Iran
- Coordinates: 37°11′41″N 50°01′34″E
- Country: Iran
- Province: Gilan
- County: Lahijan
- Bakhsh: Central
- Rural District: Layl

Population (2006)
  - Total: 716
- Time zone: UTC+3:30 (IRST)

Kuhbijar (Persian: كوه بيجار, also Romanized as Kūhbījār) is a village in Layl Rural District, in the Central District of Lahijan County, Gilan Province, Iran. Its population was 170, in 57 families at the time 2016 census, down from 716 in 2006.

The village is currently located part of Lahijan, located near the city's eastern limits.
