= Gerd-e Kuh, Lahijan =

Gerd-e Kuh گردكوه
- Village
- Location within Iran
- Coordinates: 37°09′33″N 49°57′18″E
- Country: Iran
- Province: Gilan
- County: Lahijan
- Bakhsh: Central
- Rural District: Ahandan

Population (2016)
  - Total: 139
- Time zone: UTC+3:30 (IRST)

Gerd-e Kuh (Persian: گردكوه, also Romanized as Gerd-e Kūh) is a village in Ahandan Rural District, in the Central District of Lahijan County, Gilan Province, Iran.

At the time of the 2006 National Census, the village's population was 171 in 46 households. The following census in 2011 counted 122 people in 43 households. The 2016 census measured the population of the village as 139 people in 56 households.
