= Kushal, Iran =

Village in Gilan province, Iran

Kushal Persian: كوشال
- Village
- Location within Iran
- Coordinates: 37°13′56″N 50°03′17″E
- Country: Iran
- Province: Gilan
- County: Lahijan
- District: Central
- Rural District: Layalestan

Population (2016)
  - Total: 498
- Time zone: UTC+3:30 (IRST)

Kushal (Persian: كوشال) (Note: Also romanized as Kūshāl) is a village in Layalestan Rural District of the Central District in Lahijan County, Gilan province, Iran.

== Demographics ==
=== Population ===
At the time of the 2006 National Census, the village's population was 669 in 234 households. The following census in 2011 counted 564 people in 212 households. The 2016 census measured the population of the village as 498 people in 203 households.
