= Rahimabad, Lahijan =

Rahimabad رحيم آباد
- Village
- Location within Iran
- Coordinates: 37°08′50″N 50°01′32″E
- Country: Iran
- Province: Gilan
- County: Lahijan
- Bakhsh: Central
- Rural District: Layl

Population (2016)
  - Total: 59
- Time zone: UTC+3:30 (IRST)

Rahimabad (Persian: رحيم آباد, also Romanized as Raḩīmābād) is a village in Layl Rural District, in the Central District of Lahijan County, Gilan Province, Iran. At the 2016 census, its population was 59, in 23 families. Decreased from 98 people in 2006.
