= Rajab Sara =

Rajab Sara رجب سرا
- Village
- Location within Iran
- Coordinates: 37°07′33″N 50°05′10″E
- Country: Iran
- Province: Gilan
- County: Lahijan
- Bakhsh: Central
- Rural District: Layl

Population (2016)
  - Total: 82
- Time zone: UTC+3:30 (IRST)

Rajab Sara (Persian: رجب سرا, also Romanized as Rajab Sarā) is a village in Layl Rural District, in the Central District of Lahijan County, Gilan Province, Iran.

At the time of the 2006 National Census, the village's population was 110. The following census in 2011 counted 97 people in 32 households. The 2016 census measured the population of the village as 82 people in 31 households.
