= Garmabrud =

Garmabrud گرمابرود
- Village
- Location within Iran
- Coordinates: 37°10′13″N 50°04′09″E
- Country: Iran
- Province: Gilan
- County: Lahijan
- Bakhsh: Central
- Rural District: Layl

Population (2016)
  - Total: 73
- Time zone: UTC+3:30 (IRST)

Garmabrud (Persian: گرمابرود, also Romanized as Garmābrūd; also known as Garmārūd) is a village in Layl Rural District, in the Central District of Lahijan County, Gilan Province, Iran.

At the time of the 2006 National Census, the village's population was 87 in 27 households. The following census in 2011 counted 98 people in 29 households. The 2016 census measured the population of the village as 73 people in 23 households.
