= Gushkejan =

Gushkejan گوشكجان
- Village
- Location within Iran
- Coordinates: 37°10′44″N 49°48′25″E
- Country: Iran
- Province: Gilan
- County: Lahijan
- Bakhsh: Central
- Rural District: Lafmejan

Population (2016)
  - Total: 128
- Time zone: UTC+3:30 (IRST)

Gushkejan (Persian: گوشكجان, also Romanized as Gūshkejān; also known as Gashkījān, Gishkadzhan, Gīshkajān, and Kūshkejān) is a village in Lafmejan Rural District, in the Central District of Lahijan County, Gilan Province, Iran. At the 2016 census, its population was 128, in 57 families. Decreased from 211 people in 2006.
