= Lavasi Mahalleh =

Lavasi Mahalleh لواسی محله
- Village
- Interactive map of Lavasi Mahalleh
- Coordinates: 37.158°N 50.007°E
- Country: Iran
- Province: Gilan
- County: Lahijan
- Bakhsh: Central
- Rural District: Ahandan

Population (2016)
  - Total: 63
- Time zone: UTC+3:30 (IRST)

Lavasi Mahalleh (Persian: لواسی محله, also Romanized as Lavāsī Maḩalleh) is a village in Ahandan Rural District, in the Central District of Lahijan County, Gilan Province, Iran.

At the time of the 2006 National Census, the village's population was 45 in 13 households. The following census in 2011 counted 61 people in 24 households. The 2016 census measured the population of the village as 63 people in 24 households.
