= Sharam Lengeh =

Sharam Lengeh شرم لنگه
- Village
- Interactive map of Sharam Lengeh
- Coordinates: 37.118°N 50.017°E
- Country: Iran
- Province: Gilan
- County: Lahijan
- Bakhsh: Central
- Rural District: Ahandan

Population (2016)
  - Total: 30
- Time zone: UTC+3:30 (IRST)

Sharm Lengeh (Persian: شرم لنگه) is a village in Ahandan Rural District, in the Central District of Lahijan County, Gilan Province, Iran.

At the time of the 2006 National Census, the village's population was 55 in 17 households. The following census in 2011 counted 60 people in 19 households. The 2016 census measured the population of the village as 30 people in 13 households.
