= Kahbijar =

Kahbijar كاه بيجار
- Village
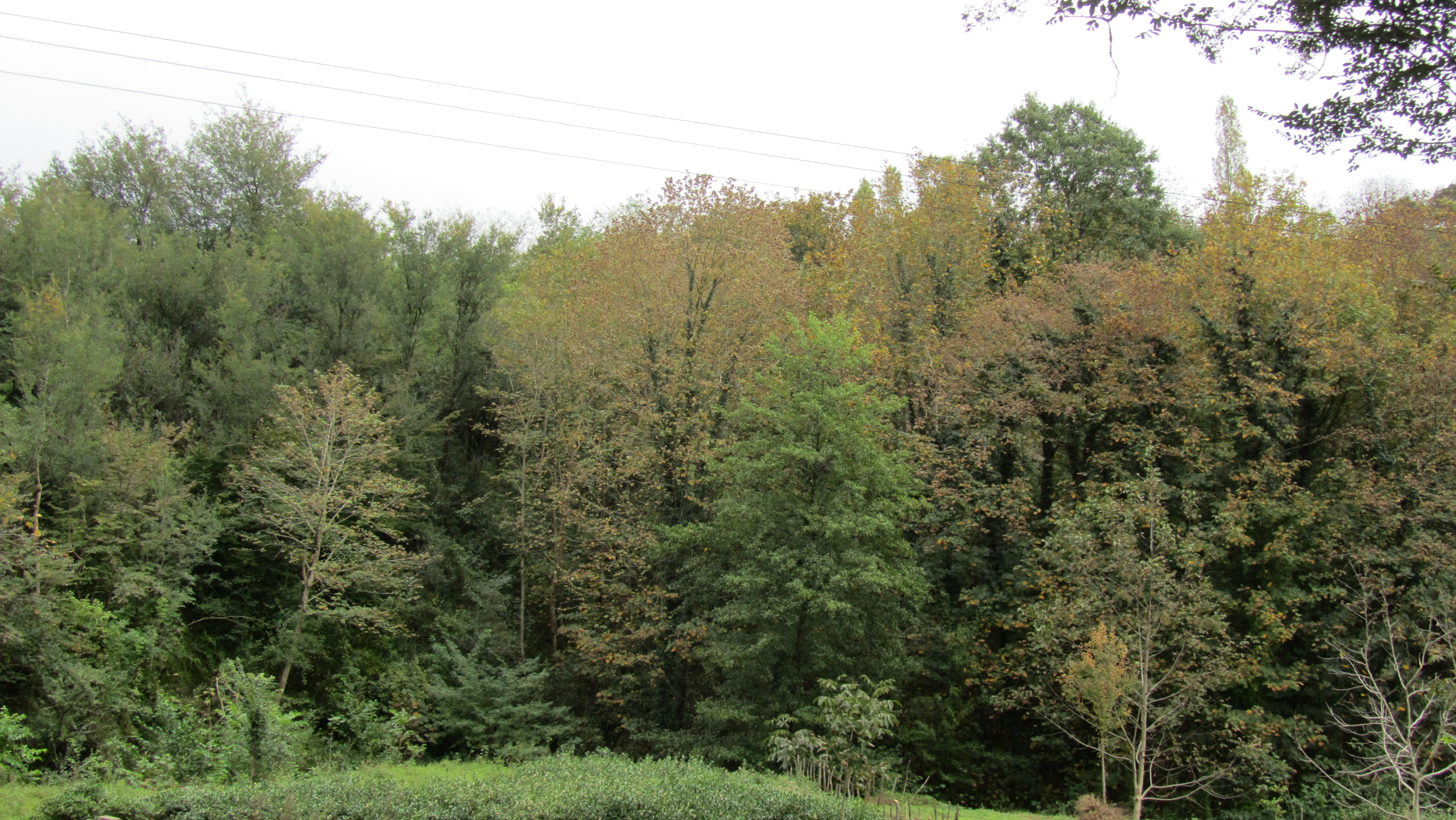
- Nature of Kah Bijar

- Location within Iran
- Coordinates: 37°07′54″N 50°05′29″E
- Country: Iran
- Province: Gilan
- County: Lahijan
- Bakhsh: Central
- Rural District: Layl

Population (2016)
  - Total: 172
- Time zone: UTC+3:30 (IRST)

Kahbijar (Persian: كاه بيجار, also Romanized as Kāhbījār; also known as Kābījār) is a village in Layl Rural District, in the Central District of Lahijan County, Gilan Province, Iran.

At the time of the 2006 National Census, the village's population was 291 in 104 households. The following census in 2011 counted 220 people in 81 households. The 2016 census measured the population of the village as 172 people in 69 households.
