= Pain Narenj Lengeh =

Pain Narenj Lengeh پایین نارنج لنگه
- Village
- Interactive map of Pain Narenj Lengeh
- Coordinates: 37.155°N 50.013°E
- Country: Iran
- Province: Gilan
- County: Lahijan
- Bakhsh: Central
- Rural District: Ahandan

Population (2016)
  - Total: 173
- Time zone: UTC+3:30 (IRST)

Pain Narenj Lengeh (Persian: پائين نارنج لنگه, also Romanized as Pā’īn Nārenj Lengeh) is a village in Ahandan Rural District, in the Central District of Lahijan County, Gilan Province, Iran.

At the time of the 2006 National Census, the village's population was 192. The following census in 2011 counted 198 people in 54 households. The 2016 census measured the population of the village as 173 people in 55 households.
