= Satlsar =

Village in Gilan province, Iran

Satlsar Persian: سطل سر
- Village
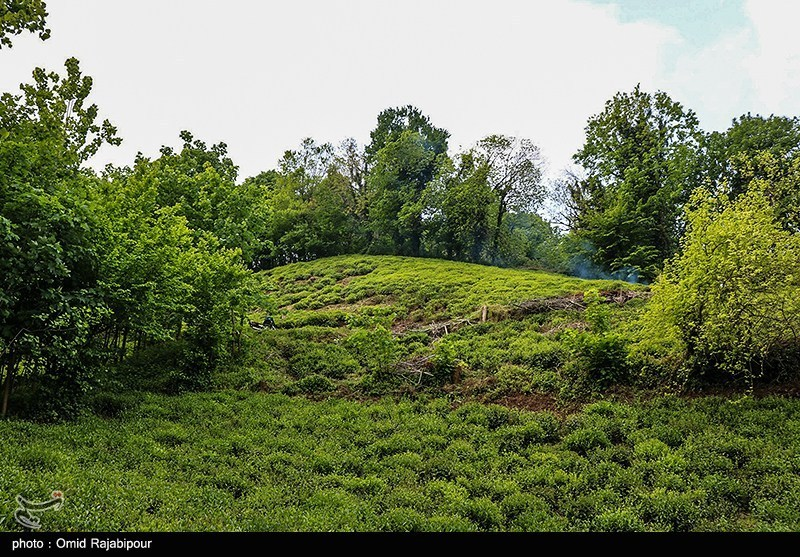
- Tea Cultivation in Satlsar

- Location within Iran
- Coordinates: 37°09′34″N 50°03′50″E
- Country: Iran
- Province: Gilan
- County: Lahijan
- District: Central
- Rural District: Layl

Population (2016)
  - Total: 834
- Time zone: UTC+3:30 (IRST)

Satlsar (Persian: سطل سر) (Note: Also romanized as Saţlsar and Saţlesar) is a village in, and the capital of, Layl Rural District in the Central District of Lahijan County, Gilan province, Iran.

== Demographics ==
=== Population ===
At the time of the 2006 National Census, the village's population was 1,020 in 307 households. The following census in 2011 counted 1,012 people in 320 households. The 2016 census measured the population of the village as 834 people in 291 households.
