= Zemidan Sara =

Zemidan Sara زميدان سرا
- Village
- Interactive map of Zemidan Sara
- Coordinates: 37.143°N 50.047°E
- Country: Iran
- Province: Gilan
- County: Lahijan
- Bakhsh: Central
- Rural District: Layl

Population (2016)
  - Total: 15
- Time zone: UTC+3:30 (IRST)

Zemidan Sara (Persian: زميدان سرا, also Romanized as Zemīdān Sarā) is a village in Layl Rural District, in the Central District of Lahijan County, Gilan Province, Iran.

At the time of the 2006 National Census, the village's population was 30 in nine households. The following census in 2011 counted 22 people in eight households. The 2016 census measured the population of the village as 15 people in five households.
