= Siah Rudbar, Gilan =

Siah Rudbar سياه رودبار
- Village
- Location within Iran
- Coordinates: 37°08′24″N 50°05′26″E
- Country: Iran
- Province: Gilan
- County: Lahijan
- Bakhsh: Central
- Rural District: Layl

Population (2016)
  - Total: 170
- Time zone: UTC+3:30 (IRST)

Siah Rudbar (Persian: سياه رودبار, also Romanized as Sīāh Rūdbār) is a village in Layl Rural District, in the Central District of Lahijan County, Gilan Province, Iran.

At the time of the 2006 National Census, the village's population was 209 in 57 households. The following census in 2011 counted 186 people in 59 households. The 2016 census measured the population of the village as 170 people in 63 households.
