= Sar Cheshmeh, Gilan =

Village in Gilan province, Iran

Sar Cheshmeh Persian: سرچشمه
- Village
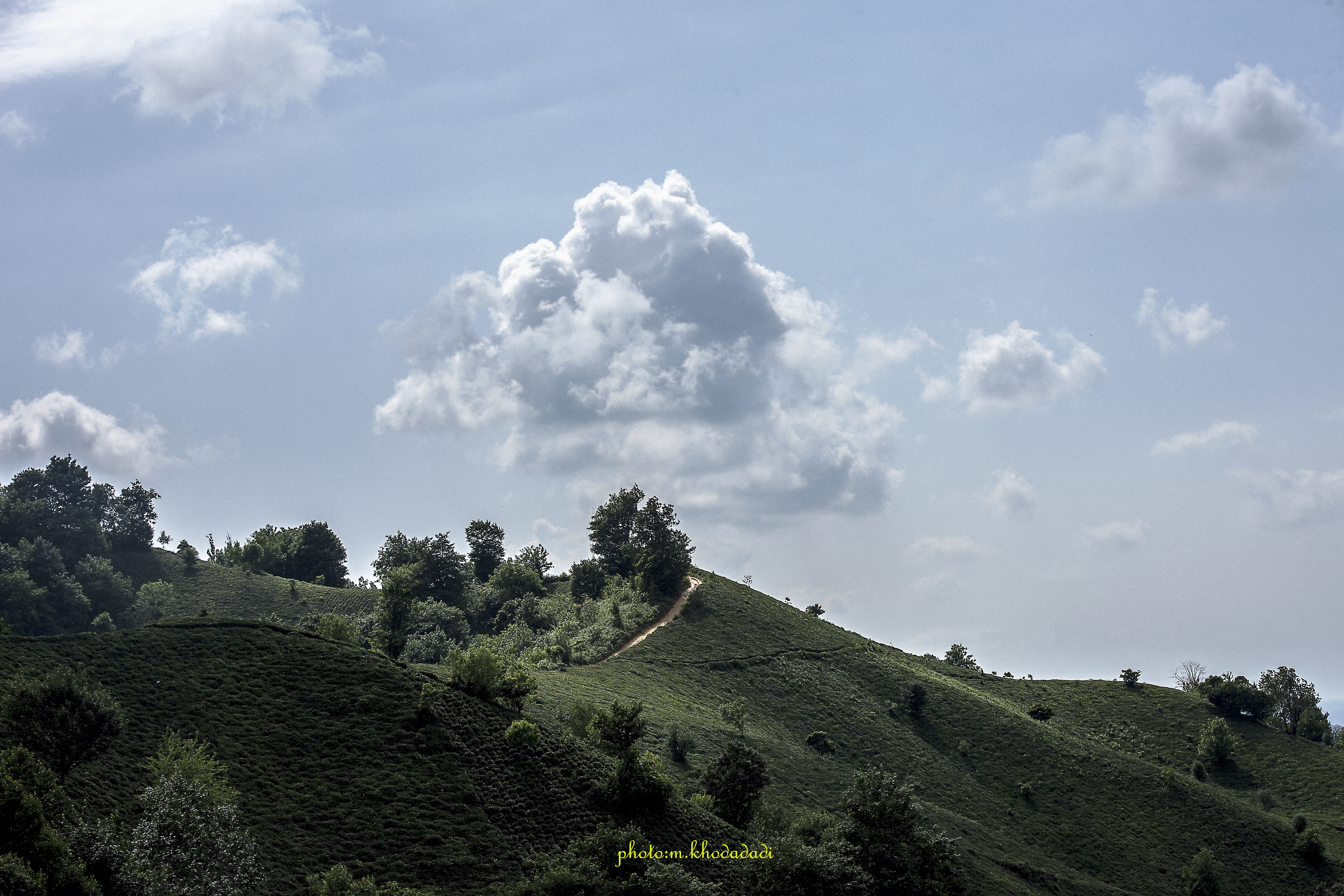

- Location within Iran
- Coordinates: 37°09′14″N 50°05′03″E
- Country: Iran
- Province: Gilan
- County: Lahijan
- District: Central
- Rural District: Layl

Population (2016)
  - Total: 359
- Time zone: UTC+3:30 (IRST)

Sar Cheshmeh (Persian: سرچشمه) (Note: Also romanized as Sar Chashmeh) is a village in Layl Rural District of the Central District in Lahijan County, Gilan province, Iran.

== Demographics ==
=== Population ===
At the time of the 2006 National Census, the village's population was 382 in 126 households. The following census in 2011 counted 344 people in 123 households. The 2016 census measured the population of the village as 359 people in 132 households.
