= Bijar Bagh =

Bijar Bagh بيجارباغ
- Village
- Location within Iran
- Coordinates: 37°10′44″N 50°03′24″E
- Country: Iran
- Province: Gilan
- County: Lahijan
- Bakhsh: Central
- Rural District: Layl

Population (2016)
  - Total: 197
- Time zone: UTC+3:30 (IRST)

Bijar Bagh (Persian: بيجارباغ, also Romanized as Bījār Bāgh) is a village in Layl Rural District, in the Central District of Lahijan County, Gilan Province, Iran.

At the time of the 2006 National Census, the village's population was 336 in 104 households. The following census in 2011 counted 252 people in 78 households. The 2016 census measured the population of the village as 197 people in 68 households.
