= Gomol =

Gomol گمل
- Village
- Location within Iran
- Coordinates: 37°07′41″N 50°01′44″E
- Country: Iran
- Province: Gilan
- County: Lahijan
- Bakhsh: Central
- Rural District: Layl

Population (2016)
  - Total: 155
- Time zone: UTC+3:30 (IRST)

Gomol (Persian: گمل) is a village in Layl Rural District, in the Central District of Lahijan County, Gilan Province, Iran.

At the time of the 2006 National Census, the village's population was 234 in 65 households. The following census in 2011 counted 197 people in 58 households. The 2016 census measured the population of the village as 155 people in 48 households.
