= Zemidan =

Village in Gilan province, Iran

Zemidan Persian: زميدان
- Village
- Location within Iran
- Coordinates: 37°09′43″N 50°04′02″E
- Country: Iran
- Province: Gilan
- County: Lahijan
- District: Central
- Rural District: Layl

Population (2016)
  - Total: 304
- Time zone: UTC+3:30 (IRST)

Zemidan (Persian: زميدان) (Note: Also romanized as Zamīdān, Zemīdān, and Zomeydan) is a village in Layl Rural District of the Central District in Lahijan County, Gilan province, Iran.

== Demographics ==
=== Population ===
At the time of the 2006 National Census, the village's population was 369 in 98 households. The following census in 2011 counted 250 people in 79 households. The 2016 census measured the population of the village as 304 people in 103 households.
