= Ramezan Bijar =

Ramezan Bijar رمضان بيجار
- Village
- Interactive map of Ramezan Bijar
- Coordinates: 37.13°N 50.035°E
- Country: Iran
- Province: Gilan
- County: Lahijan
- Bakhsh: Central
- Rural District: Layl

Population (2016)
  - Total: 15
- Time zone: UTC+3:30 (IRST)

Ramezan Bijar (Persian: رمضان بيجار, also Romanized as Rameẕān Bījār) is a village in Layl Rural District, in the Central District of Lahijan County, Gilan Province, Iran.

At the time of the 2006 National Census, the village's population was 23 in 7 households. The following census in 2011 counted 27 people in 9 households. The 2016 census measured the population of the village as 15 people in 7 households.
