= Mian Mahalleh-ye Zakleh Bar =

Village in Gilan province, Iran

Mian Mahalleh-ye Zakleh Bar Persian: ميان محله زاكله بر
- Village
- Location within Iran
- Coordinates: 37°08′36″N 50°00′10″E
- Country: Iran
- Province: Gilan
- County: Lahijan
- District: Central
- Rural District: Ahandan

Population (2016)
  - Total: 292
- Time zone: UTC+3:30 (IRST)

Mian Mahalleh-ye Zakleh Bar (Persian: ميان محله زاكله بر) (Note: Also romanized as Mīān Maḩalleh-ye Zākleh Bar; also known as Zāklebar and Zāklīvar) is a village in Ahandan Rural District of the Central District in Lahijan County, Gilan province, Iran.

== Demographics ==
=== Population ===
At the time of the 2006 National Census, the village's population was 274 in 77 households. The following census in 2011 counted 265 people in 83 households. The 2016 census measured the population of the village as 292 people in 99 households.
