= Shiva, Iran =

Shiva شيوا
- Village
- Location within Iran
- Coordinates: 37°12′18″N 49°48′36″E
- Country: Iran
- Province: Gilan
- County: Lahijan
- Bakhsh: Central
- Rural District: Lafmejan

Population (2016)
  - Total: 173
- Time zone: UTC+3:30 (IRST)

Shiva (Persian: شيوا, also Romanized as Shīvā; also known as Shīū) is a village in Lafmejan Rural District, in the Central District of Lahijan County, Gilan Province, Iran. At the 2006 census, its population was 173, in 64 families. Down from 204 people in 2006.
