= Motaalleq Mahalleh =

Motaalleq Mahalleh or Motaaleq Mahalleh (Persian: متعلق محله) may refer to:

- Motaalleq Mahalleh-ye Arbastan
- Motaalleq Mahalleh-ye Nowbijar
