= Mian Gavaber =

Mian Gavaber (Persian: ميان گوابر) may refer to:

- Mian Gavaber, Lahijan
- Mian Gavaber, Langarud
