= Bijar Basteh Sar =

Bijar Basteh Sar بيجاربسته سر
- Village
- Location within Iran
- Coordinates: 37°13′29″N 50°03′16″E
- Country: Iran
- Province: Gilan
- County: Lahijan
- Bakhsh: Central
- Rural District: Layalestan

Population (2016)
  - Total: 112
- Time zone: UTC+3:30 (IRST)

Bijar Basteh Sar (Persian: بيجاربسته سر, also Romanized as Bījār Basteh Sar) is a village in Layalestan Rural District, in the Central District of Lahijan County, Gilan Province, Iran.

At the time of the 2006 National Census, the village's population was 134 in 45 households. The following census in 2011 counted 124 people in 44 households. The 2016 census measured the population of the village as 112 people in 47 households.
