= Narenj Kelayeh =

Narenj Kelayeh نارنج كلايه
- Village
- Location within Iran
- Coordinates: 37°10′11″N 50°03′51″E
- Country: Iran
- Province: Gilan
- County: Lahijan
- Bakhsh: Central
- Rural District: Layl

Population (2016)
  - Total: 95
- Time zone: UTC+3:30 (IRST)

Narenj Kelayeh (Persian: نارنج كلايه, also Romanized as Nārenj Kelāyeh; also known as Nāranjkelāyeh) is a village in Layl Rural District, in the Central District of Lahijan County, Gilan Province, Iran.

At the time of the 2006 National Census, the village's population was 138 in 37 households. The following census in 2011 counted 156 people in 48 households. The 2016 census measured the population of the village as 95 people in 29 households.
