= Golestan, Gilan =

Golestan گلستان
- Village
- Location within Iran
- Coordinates: 37°02′21″N 49°45′12″E
- Country: Iran
- Province: Gilan
- County: Lahijan
- Bakhsh: Central
- Rural District: Ahandan

Population (2016)
  - Total: 23
- Time zone: UTC+3:30 (IRST)

Golestan (Persian: گلستان, also Romanized as Golestān) is a village in Ahandan Rural District, in the Central District of Lahijan County, Gilan Province, Iran.

At the time of the 2006 National Census, the village's population was 42 in 10 households. The following census in 2011 counted 27 people in 9 households. The 2016 census measured the population of the village as 23 people in 8 households.
