= Shad Deh =

Shad Deh (Persian: شادده), also rendered as Shadeh or Shady, may refer to:

- Bala Shad Deh
- Pain Shad Deh
