= Tanazarud =

Tanazarud تنازارود
- Village
- Interactive map of Tanazarud
- Coordinates: 37.163°N 50.079°E
- Country: Iran
- Province: Gilan
- County: Lahijan
- Bakhsh: Central
- Rural District: Layl

Population (2016)
  - Total: 89
- Time zone: UTC+3:30 (IRST)

Tanazarud (Persian: تنازارود, also Romanized as Tanāzārūd) is a village in Layl Rural District, in the Central District of Lahijan County, Gilan Province, Iran.

At the time of the 2006 National Census, the village's population was 120 in 34 households. The following census in 2011 counted 112 people in 33 households. The 2016 census measured the population of the village as 89 people in 23 households.
