= Dehsar, Ahandan =

Village in Gilan province, Iran

Dehsar Persian: دهسر
- Village
- Location within Iran
- Coordinates: 37°09′23″N 49°56′45″E
- Country: Iran
- Province: Gilan
- County: Lahijan
- District: Central
- Rural District: Ahandan

Population (2016)
  - Total: 1,240
- Time zone: UTC+3:30 (IRST)

Dehsar (Persian: دهسر) (Note: Also romanized as Deh Sar) is a village in Ahandan Rural District of the Central District in Lahijan County, Gilan province, Iran.

== Demographics ==
=== Population ===
At the time of the 2006 National Census, the village's population was 398 in 103 households. The following census in 2011 counted 371 people in 117 households. The 2016 census measured the population of the village as 1,240 people in 116 households.
