= Darreh Jir =

Village in Gilan province, Iran

Darreh Jir Persian: دره جير
- Village
- Location within Iran
- Coordinates: 37°10′04″N 50°00′06″E
- Country: Iran
- Province: Gilan
- County: Lahijan
- District: Central
- Rural District: Ahandan

Population (2016)
  - Total: 213
- Time zone: UTC+3:30 (IRST)

Darreh Jir (Persian: دره جير) (Note: Also romanized as Darreh Jīr) is a village in Ahandan Rural District of the Central District in Lahijan County, Gilan province, Iran.

== Demographics ==
=== Population ===
At the time of the 2006 National Census, the village's population was 215 in 71 households. The following census in 2011 counted 200 people in 69 households. The 2016 census measured the population of the village as 213 people in 77 households.
