= Halukhani =

Halukhani هالوخانی
- Village
- Location within Iran
- Coordinates: 37°08′59″N 49°58′57″E
- Country: Iran
- Province: Gilan
- County: Lahijan
- Bakhsh: Central
- Rural District: Ahandan

Population (2016)
  - Total: 74
- Time zone: UTC+3:30 (IRST)

Halukhani (Persian: هالوخانی, also Romanized as Hālūkhānī) is a village in Ahandan Rural District, in the Central District of Lahijan County, Gilan Province, Iran.

At the time of the 2006 National Census, the village's population was 96 in 21 households. The following census in 2011 counted 92 people in 31 households. The 2016 census measured the population of the village as 74 people in 26 households.
