= Pashaki =

Pashaki or Pashki (Persian: پاشاكی), also rendered as Pashakh, may refer to:

- Bala Mahalleh-ye Pashaki
- Pain Mahalleh-ye Pashaki
