= Morad Dahandeh =

Morad Dahandeh مراددهنده
- Village
- Location within Iran
- Coordinates: 37°09′51″N 50°01′29″E
- Country: Iran
- Province: Gilan
- County: Lahijan
- Bakhsh: Central
- Rural District: Layl

Population (2016)
  - Total: 173
- Time zone: UTC+3:30 (IRST)

Morad Dahandeh (Persian: مراددهنده, also Romanized as Morād Dahandeh) is a village in Layl Rural District, in the Central District of Lahijan County, Gilan Province, Iran.

At the time of the 2006 National Census, the village's population was 208 in 58 households. The following census in 2011 counted 189 people in 62 households. The 2016 census measured the population of the village as 173 people in 60 households.
