= Chalak, Lahijan =

Chalak چلک
- Village
- Location within Iran
- Coordinates: 37°08′22″N 49°57′04″E
- Country: Iran
- Province: Gilan
- County: Lahijan
- Bakhsh: Central
- Rural District: Layl

Population (2016)
  - Total: 139
- Time zone: UTC+3:30 (IRST)

Chalak (Persian: چلک) is a village in Layl Rural District, in the Central District of Lahijan County, Gilan Province, Iran.

At the time of the 2006 National Census, the village's population was 141 in 41 households. The following census in 2011 counted 169 people in 51 households. The 2016 census measured the population of the village as 139 people in 42 households.
