= Qazi Gavaber =

Qazi Gavaber قاضی گوابر
- Village
- Interactive map of Qazi Gavaber
- Coordinates: 37.129°N 49.944°E
- Country: Iran
- Province: Gilan
- County: Lahijan
- Bakhsh: Central
- Rural District: Ahandan

Population (2016)
  - Total: 24
- Time zone: UTC+3:30 (IRST)

Qazi Gavaber (Persian: قاضی گوابر, also Romanized as Qāẕī Gavāber) is a village in Ahandan Rural District, in the Central District of Lahijan County, Gilan Province, Iran.

At the time of the 2006 National Census, the village's population was 54 in 16 households. The following census in 2011 counted 70 people in 23 households. The 2016 census measured the population of the village as 24 people in 9 households.
