= Azarsetanaki =

Village in Gilan province, Iran

Azarsetanaki Persian: آزارستانکی
- Village
- Location within Iran
- Coordinates: 37°09′31″N 49°59′32″E
- Country: Iran
- Province: Gilan
- County: Lahijan
- District: Central
- Rural District: Ahandan

Population (2016)
  - Total: 229
- Time zone: UTC+3:30 (IRST)

Azarsetanaki (Persian: آزارستانکی) (Note: Also romanized as Āzārsetānakī; also known as Āzārsetān) is a village in Ahandan Rural District of the Central District in Lahijan County, Gilan province, Iran.

== Demographics ==
=== Population ===
At the time of the 2006 National Census, the village's population was 261 in 82 households. The following census in 2011 counted 203 people in 77 households. The 2016 census measured the population of the village as 229 people in 90 households.
