= Rahdar Khaneh, Gilan =

Rahdar Khaneh راهدارخانه
- Village
- Interactive map of Rahdar Khaneh
- Coordinates: 37.125°N 49.992°E
- Country: Iran
- Province: Gilan
- County: Lahijan
- Bakhsh: Central
- Rural District: Ahandan

Population (2016)
  - Total: 29
- Time zone: UTC+3:30 (IRST)

Rahdar Khaneh (Persian: راهدارخانه, also Romanized as Rāhdār Khāneh) is a village in Ahandan Rural District, in the Central District of Lahijan County, Gilan Province, Iran.

At the time of the 2006 National Census, the village's population was 36 in 10 households. The following census in 2011 counted 34 people in 13 households. The 2016 census measured the population of the village as 29 people in 13 households.
