= Mazi Kalleh =

Mazi Kalleh مازی كله
- Village
- Location within Iran
- Coordinates: 37°10′59″N 49°57′52″E
- Country: Iran
- Province: Gilan
- County: Lahijan
- Bakhsh: Central
- Rural District: Ahandan

Population (2016)
  - Total: 108
- Time zone: UTC+3:30 (IRST)

Mazi Kalleh (Persian: مازی كله, also Romanized as Māzī Kalleh; also known as Muzikalah) is a village in Ahandan Rural District, in the Central District of Lahijan County, Gilan Province, Iran.

At the time of the 2006 National Census, the village's population was 131 in 24 households. The following census in 2011 counted 114 people in 33 households. The 2016 census measured the population of the village as 108 people in 36 households.
