= Bala Tamushal =

Village in Gilan province, Iran

Bala Tamushal Persian: بالاتموشل
- Village
- Location within Iran
- Coordinates: 37°09′28″N 49°56′26″E
- Country: Iran
- Province: Gilan
- County: Lahijan
- District: Central
- Rural District: Ahandan

Population (2016)
  - Total: 315
- Time zone: UTC+3:30 (IRST)

Bala Tamushal (Persian: بالاتموشل) (Note: Also romanized as Bālā Tamūshal; also known as Bālāmaḩalleh-ye Tamūshal) is a village in Ahandan Rural District of the Central District in Lahijan County, Gilan province, Iran.

== Demographics ==
=== Population ===
At the time of the 2006 National Census, the village's population was 387 in 112 households. The following census in 2011 counted 344 people in 110 households. The 2016 census measured the population of the village as 315 people in 110 households.
