= Gurandan, Gilan =

Gurandan گوراندان
- Village
- Location within Iran
- Coordinates: 37°13′36″N 50°02′39″E
- Country: Iran
- Province: Gilan
- County: Lahijan
- Bakhsh: Central
- Rural District: Layalestan

Population (2016)
  - Total: 297
- Time zone: UTC+3:30 (IRST)

Gurandan (Persian: گوراندان, also Romanized as Gūrandān) is a village in Layalestan Rural District, in the Central District of Lahijan County, Gilan Province, Iran.

At the time of the 2006 National Census, the village's population was 375 in 121 households. The following census in 2011 counted 329 people in 121 households. The 2016 census measured the population of the village as 297 people in 121 households.
