= Bijar Boneh, Lahijan =

Bijar Boneh بيجاربنه
- Village
- Location within Iran
- Coordinates: 37°13′21″N 49°50′59″E
- Country: Iran
- Province: Gilan
- County: Lahijan
- Bakhsh: Central
- Rural District: Lafmejan

Population (2016)
  - Total: 51
- Time zone: UTC+3:30 (IRST)

Bijar Boneh (Persian: بيجاربنه, also Romanized as Bījār Boneh; also known as Bījār Boneh-ye Kīsūm) is a village in Lafmejan Rural District, in the Central District of Lahijan County, Gilan Province, Iran. At the 2016 census, its population was 51, in 27 families. Up from 49 in 2006.
