= Pain Tamushal =

Pain Tamushal پائين تموشل
- Village
- Location within Iran
- Coordinates: 37°10′18″N 49°56′56″E
- Country: Iran
- Province: Gilan
- County: Lahijan
- Bakhsh: Central
- Rural District: Ahandan

Population (2016)
  - Total: 152
- Time zone: UTC+3:30 (IRST)

Pain Tamushal (Persian: پائين تموشل, also Romanized as Pā’īn Tamūshal; also known as Pāeenmaḩalleh-ye Tamūshal) is a village in Ahandan Rural District, in the Central District of Lahijan County, Gilan Province, Iran.

At the time of the 2006 National Census, the village's population was 245. The following census in 2011 counted 205 people in 64 households. The 2016 census measured the population of the village as 152 people in 52 households.
