= Siah Gurab-e Bala =

Siah Gurab-e Bala سياهگوراب بالا
- Village
- Location within Iran
- Coordinates: 37°14′09″N 50°02′42″E
- Country: Iran
- Province: Gilan
- County: Lahijan
- Bakhsh: Central
- Rural District: Layalestan

Population (2016)
  - Total: 126
- Time zone: UTC+3:30 (IRST)

Siah Gurab-e Bala (Persian: سياهگوراب بالا, also Romanized as Sīāh Gūrāb-e Bālā) is a village in Layalestan Rural District, in the Central District of Lahijan County, Gilan Province, Iran.

At the time of the 2006 National Census, the village's population was 211 in 82 households. The following census in 2011 counted 164 people in 60 households. The 2016 census measured the population of the village as 126 people in 54 households.
