= Pain Fidarreh =

Pain Fidarreh پايين فيدره
- Village
- Location within Iran
- Coordinates: 37°08′32″N 50°02′42″E
- Country: Iran
- Province: Gilan
- County: Lahijan
- Bakhsh: Central
- Rural District: Layl

Population (2016)
  - Total: 68
- Time zone: UTC+3:30 (IRST)

Pain Fidarreh (Persian: پايين فيدره, also Romanized as Pā’īn Fīdarreh; also known as Pā’īn Fedreh and Pā’īn Fūdarreh) is a village in Layl Rural District, in the Central District of Lahijan County, Gilan Province, Iran.

At the time of the 2006 National Census, the village's population was 90 in 34 households. The following census in 2011 counted 71 people in 27 households. The 2016 census measured the population of the village as 68 people in 29 households.
