= Jir Gavaber =

Jir Gavaber or Jir Gavabar or Jirgavabar or Jirgovaber (Persian: جيرگوابر) may refer to:

- Jir Gavaber, Amlash
- Jir Gavabar, Lahijan
