= Bandbon-e Bala =

Bandbon-e Bala بندبن بالا
- Village
- Location within Iran
- Coordinates: 37°09′01″N 49°57′05″E
- Country: Iran
- Province: Gilan
- County: Lahijan
- Bakhsh: Central
- Rural District: Ahandan

Population (2016)
  - Total: 44
- Time zone: UTC+3:30 (IRST)

Bandbon-e Bala (Persian: بندبن بالا, also Romanized as Bandbon-e Bālā; also known as Bālā Bandbūn and Bandbūn) is a village in Ahandan Rural District, in the Central District of Lahijan County, Gilan Province, Iran. At the 2006 census, its population was 44, in 21 families. Down from 76 people in 2006.
