= Bala Mahalleh-ye Pashaki =

Village in Gilan province, Iran

Bala Mahalleh-ye Pashaki Persian: بالا محله پاشاكی
- Village
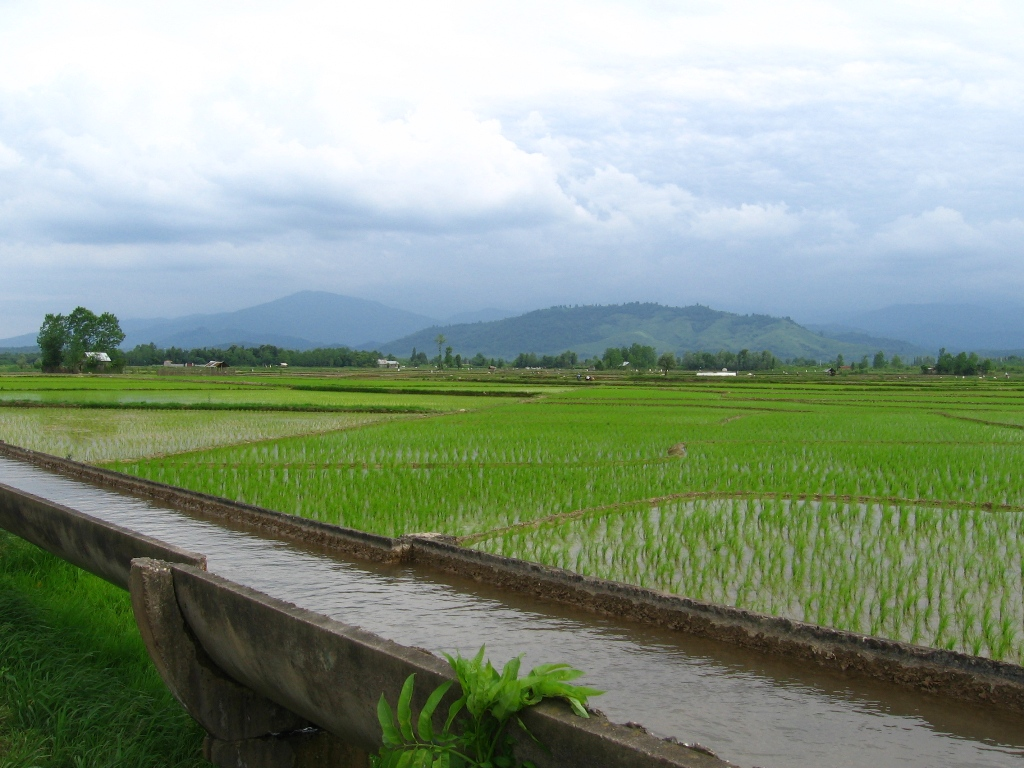
- Natural lansdcape of Pashaki

- Location within Iran
- Coordinates: 37°09′33″N 49°48′09″E
- Country: Iran
- Province: Gilan
- County: Lahijan
- District: Central
- Rural District: Lafmejan

Population (2016)
  - Total: 1,154
- Time zone: UTC+3:30 (IRST)

Bala Mahalleh-ye Pashaki (Persian: بالامحله پاشاكی) (Note: Also romanized as Bālā Maḩalleh-ye Pāshākī; also known as Pashakh, Pāshākī, Pāshākī Bālā Maḩalleh, and Pāshkī) is a village in Lafmejan Rural District of the Central District in Lahijan County, Gilan province, in Iran.

== Demographics ==
=== Population ===
At the time of the 2006 National Census, the village's population was 1,494 in 509 households. The following census in 2011 counted 1,278 people in 488 households. The 2016 census measured the population of the village as 1,154 people in 461 households. It was the most populous village in its rural district.
