= Bala Mahalleh-ye Lafmejan =

Bala Mahalleh-ye Lafmejan بالامحله لفمجان
- Village
- Location within Iran
- Coordinates: 37°11′35″N 49°52′33″E
- Country: Iran
- Province: Gilan
- County: Lahijan
- Bakhsh: Central
- Rural District: Lafmejan

Population (2016)
  - Total: 219
- Time zone: UTC+3:30 (IRST)

Bala Mahalleh-ye Lafmejan (Persian: بالامحله لفمجان, also Romanized as Bālā Maḩalleh-ye Lafmejān; also known as Lafmajān, Lafmejān, Lafmudzhan, and Lafmujān) is a village in Lafmejan Rural District, in the Central District of Lahijan County, Gilan Province, Iran. At the 2016 census, its population was 219, in 86 families, up from 198 in 2006.
