= Bandbon-e Pain =

Bandbon-e Pain بندبن پائين
- Village
- Location within Iran
- Coordinates: 37°10′50″N 49°57′55″E
- Country: Iran
- Province: Gilan
- County: Lahijan
- Bakhsh: Central
- Rural District: Ahandan

Population (2016)
  - Total: 101
- Time zone: UTC+3:30 (IRST)

Bandbon-e Pain (Persian: بندبن پائين, also Romanized as Bandbon-e Pā’īn) is a village in Ahandan Rural District, in the Central District of Lahijan County, Gilan Province, Iran. At the 2006 census, its population was 101, in 37 families. Down from 122 people in 2006.
