= Chahar Khaneh Sar-e Bala =

Chahar Khaneh Sar-e Bala چهارخانه سر بالا
- Village
- Interactive map of Chahar Khaneh Sar-e Bala
- Coordinates: 37.197°N 50.031°E
- Country: Iran
- Province: Gilan
- County: Lahijan
- Bakhsh: Central
- Rural District: Layl

Population (2016)
  - Total: 15
- Time zone: UTC+3:30 (IRST)

Chahar Khaneh Sar-e Bala (Persian: چهارخانه سر بالا, also Romanized as Chahār Khāneh Sar-e Bālā) is a village in Layl Rural District, in the Central District of Lahijan County, Gilan Province, Iran.

At the time of the 2006 National Census, the village's population was 21 in 6 households. The following census in 2011 counted 23 people in 7 households. The 2016 census measured the population of the village as 15 people in 6 households.
