= Bala Shad Deh =

Village in Gilan province, Iran

Bala Shad Deh Persian: بالاشادده
- Village
- Location within Iran
- Coordinates: 37°11′41″N 49°49′11″E
- Country: Iran
- Province: Gilan
- County: Lahijan
- District: Central
- Rural District: Lafmejan

Population (2016)
  - Total: 257
- Time zone: UTC+3:30 (IRST)

Bala Shad Deh (Persian: بالاشادده) (Note: Also romanized as Bālā Shād Deh; also known as Bālā Shādeh and Shādeh) is a village in Lafmejan Rural District of the Central District in Lahijan County, Gilan province, in Iran.

== Demographics ==
=== Population ===
At the time of the 2006 National Census, the village's population was 291 in 93 households. The following census in 2011 counted 276 people in 93 households. The 2016 census measured the population of the village as 257 people in 98 households.
