= Jir Gavabar, Lahijan =

Jir Gavabar جيرگوابر
- Village
- Location within Iran
- Coordinates: 37°08′41″N 49°58′54″E
- Country: Iran
- Province: Gilan
- County: Lahijan
- Bakhsh: Central
- Rural District: Ahandan

Population (2016)
  - Total: 57
- Time zone: UTC+3:30 (IRST)

Jir Gavabar (Persian: جيرگوابر, also Romanized as Jīr Gavābar; also known as Jirgaver) is a village in Ahandan Rural District, in the Central District of Lahijan County, Gilan Province, Iran.

At the time of the 2006 National Census, the village's population was 90 in 27 households. The following census in 2011 counted 78 people in 27 households. The 2016 census measured the population of the village as 57 people in 24 households.
