= Lahashar =

Lahashar لاحشر
- Village
- Location within Iran
- Coordinates: 37°12′16″N 49°52′27″E
- Country: Iran
- Province: Gilan
- County: Lahijan
- Bakhsh: Central
- Rural District: Lafmejan

Population (2016)
  - Total: 60
- Time zone: UTC+3:30 (IRST)

Lahashar (Persian: لاحشر, also Romanized as Lāḩashar; also known as Lahash) is a village in Lafmejan Rural District, in the Central District of Lahijan County, Gilan Province, Iran. At the 2006 census, its population was 60, in 29 families. Down from 83 in 2006.
