= Pain Shad Deh =

Village in Gilan province, Iran

Pain Shad Deh Persian: پايين شادده
- Village
- Location within Iran
- Coordinates: 37°12′00″N 49°49′38″E
- Country: Iran
- Province: Gilan
- County: Lahijan
- District: Central
- Rural District: Lafmejan

Population (2016)
  - Total: 210
- Time zone: UTC+3:30 (IRST)

Pain Shad Deh (Persian: پايين شادده) (Note: Also romanized as Pā’īn Shād Deh; also known as Pā’īn Shādeh, Shādeh, and Shady) is a village in Lafmejan Rural District of the Central District in Lahijan County, Gilan province, in Iran.

== Demographics ==
=== Population ===
At the time of the 2006 National Census, the village's population was 282 in 110 households. The following census in 2011 counted 223 people in 87 households. The 2016 census measured the population of the village as 210 people in 86 households.
