= Amir Kalayeh =

Amir Kalayeh اميركلايه
- Village
- Location within Iran
- Coordinates: 37°11′13″N 50°02′27″E
- Country: Iran
- Province: Gilan
- County: Lahijan
- Bakhsh: Central
- Rural District: Layl

Population (2016)
  - Total: 84
- Time zone: UTC+3:30 (IRST)

Amir Kalayeh (Persian: اميركلايه, also Romanized as Amīr Kalāyeh; also known as Amīr Kolā) is a village in Layl Rural District, in the Central District of Lahijan County, Gilan Province, Iran.

At the time of the 2006 National Census, the village's population was 64 in 16 households. The following census in 2011 counted 74 people in 22 households. The 2016 census measured the population of the village as 84 people in 30 households.
