= Motaalleq Mahalleh-ye Nowbijar =

Motaalleq Mahalleh-ye Nowbijar متعلق محله نوبيجار
- Village
- Location within Iran
- Coordinates: 37°14′28″N 50°02′07″E
- Country: Iran
- Province: Gilan
- County: Lahijan
- Bakhsh: Central
- Rural District: Layalestan

Population (2016)
  - Total: 237
- Time zone: UTC+3:30 (IRST)

Motaalleq Mahalleh-ye Nowbijar (Persian: متعلق محله نوبيجار, also Romanized as Mota‘alleq Maḩalleh-ye Nowbījār; also known as Mota‘aleq Maḩalleh and Mota‘alleq Maḩalleh) is a village in Layalestan Rural District, in the Central District of Lahijan County, Gilan Province, Iran.

At the time of the 2006 National Census, the village's population was 303 in 108 households. The following census in 2011 counted 268 people in 105 households. The 2016 census measured the population of the village as 237 people in 89 households.
