= Bala Bijar Ankish =

Bala Bijar Ankish بالابيجارانكيش
- Village
- Location within Iran
- Coordinates: 37°07′09″N 49°58′03″E
- Country: Iran
- Province: Gilan
- County: Lahijan
- Bakhsh: Central
- Rural District: Ahandan

Population (2016)
  - Total: 15
- Time zone: UTC+3:30 (IRST)

Bala Bijar Ankish (Persian: بالابيجارانكيش, also Romanized as Bālā Bījār Ankīsh; also known as Bījār Ankīsh-e Bālā) is a village in Ahandan Rural District, in the Central District of Lahijan County, Gilan Province, Iran.

At the time of the 2006 National Census, the village's population was 38 in 7 households. The following census in 2011 counted 20 people in 7 households. The 2016 census measured the population of the village as 15 people in 5 households.
