= Pain Mahalleh-ye Pashaki =

Village in Gilan province, Iran

Pain Mahalleh-ye Pashaki Persian: پايين محله پاشاكی
- Village
- Location within Iran
- Coordinates: 37°10′01″N 49°48′11″E
- Country: Iran
- Province: Gilan
- County: Lahijan
- District: Central
- Rural District: Lafmejan

Population (2016)
  - Total: 802
- Time zone: UTC+3:30 (IRST)

Pain Mahalleh-ye Pashaki (Persian: پايين محله پاشاكی) (Note: Also romanized as Pā’īn Maḩalleh-ye Pāshākī; also known as Pā’īn Maḩalleh, Pāshākī Pā’īn Maḩalleh, and Pāshkī-ye Pā’īn) is a village in Lafmejan Rural District of the Central District in Lahijan County, Gilan province, in Iran.

== Demographics ==
=== Population ===
At the time of the 2006 National Census, the village's population was 1,090 in 333 households. The following census in 2011 counted 931 people in 328 households. The 2016 census measured the population of the village as 802 people in 310 households.
