= Kia Sara =

Kia Sara or Kiya Sara or Keya Sara (Persian: كياسرا) may refer to:

- Kia Sara, Lahijan
- Kia Sara, Rasht
- Kia Sara, Rudsar
