= Amirkola (disambiguation) =

Amirkola is a city in Mazandaran Province, Iran.

Amirkola or Amir Kola (Persian: اميركلا) may refer to:

- Amir Kola, Gilan
- Amir Kola, Babol Kenar, Mazandaran Province
- Amir Kola, Savadkuh, Mazandaran Province
