= Kateshal-e Bala =

Village in Gilan province, Iran

Kateshal-e Bala Persian: كتشال بالا
- Village
- Location within Iran
- Coordinates: 37°10′24″N 50°02′21″E
- Country: Iran
- Province: Gilan
- County: Lahijan
- District: Central
- Rural District: Layl

Population (2016)
  - Total: 330
- Time zone: UTC+3:30 (IRST)

Kateshal-e Bala (Persian: كتشال بالا) (Note: Also romanized as Kateshāl-e Bālā; also known as Kateh Shāl, Kateshāl, and Katshāl) is a village in Layl Rural District of the Central District in Lahijan County, Gilan province, Iran.

== Demographics ==
=== Population ===
At the time of the 2006 National Census, the village's population was 366 in 104 households. The following census in 2011 counted 478 people in 112 households. The 2016 census measured the population of the village as 330 people in 114 households.
