= Bujayeh =

Village in Gilan province, Iran

Bujayeh Persian: بوجايه
- Village
- Location within Iran
- Coordinates: 37°11′32″N 49°58′57″E
- Country: Iran
- Province: Gilan
- County: Lahijan
- District: Central
- Rural District: Ahandan

Population (2016)
  - Total: 551
- Time zone: UTC+3:30 (IRST)

Bujayeh (Persian: بوجايه) (Note: Also romanized as Būjāyeh; also known as Bū Jā’ī, Bū Jāneh-ye Bālā, Būjā’ī, and Būjāneh) is a village in Ahandan Rural District of the Central District in Lahijan County, Gilan province, Iran. The village is located southwest of Lahijan's city limits.

== Demographics ==
=== Population ===
At the time of the 2006 National Census, the village's population was 3,186 in 888 households. The following census in 2011 counted 455 people in 138 households, as most of the village was annexed to Lahijan's urban area. The 2016 census measured the population of the village as 551 people in 183 households.
