= Pain Mahalleh-ye Lafmejan =

Village in Gilan province, Iran

Pain Mahalleh-ye Lafmejan Persian: پائين محله لفمجان
- Village
- Location within Iran
- Coordinates: 37°13′06″N 49°52′25″E
- Country: Iran
- Province: Gilan
- County: Lahijan
- District: Central
- Rural District: Lafmejan

Population (2016)
  - Total: 219
- Time zone: UTC+3:30 (IRST)

Pain Mahalleh-ye Lafmejan (Persian: پائين محله لفمجان) (Note: Also romanized as Pā’īn Maḩalleh-ye Lafmejān) is a village in Lafmejan Rural District of the Central District in Lahijan County, Gilan province, in Iran.

== Demographics ==
=== Population ===
At the time of the 2006 National Census, the village's population was 198 in 68 households. The following census in 2011 counted 170 people in 66 households. The 2016 census measured the population of the village as 219 people in 86 households.
