= Kia Sara, Lahijan =

Village in Gilan province, Iran

Kia Sara Persian: كياسرا
- Village
- Location within Iran
- Coordinates: 37°11′42″N 49°51′07″E
- Country: Iran
- Province: Gilan
- County: Lahijan
- District: Central
- Rural District: Lafmejan

Population (2016)
  - Total: 209
- Time zone: UTC+3:30 (IRST)

Kia Sara (Persian: كياسرا) (Note: Also romanized as Kīā Sarā) is a village in Lafmejan Rural District of the Central District in Lahijan County, Gilan province, in Iran.

== Demographics ==
=== Population ===
At the time of the 2006 National Census, the village's population was 321 in 105 households. The following census in 2011 counted 269 people in 105 households. The 2016 census measured the population of the village as 209 people in 80 households.
