= Mian Gavaber, Lahijan =

Mian Gavaber ميان گوابر
- Village
- Location within Iran
- Coordinates: 37°08′42″N 49°59′16″E
- Country: Iran
- Province: Gilan
- County: Lahijan
- Bakhsh: Central
- Rural District: Ahandan

Population (2016)
  - Total: 7
- Time zone: UTC+3:30 (IRST)

Mian Gavaber (Persian: ميان گوابر, also Romanized as Mīān Gavāber; also known as Miyangaver) is a village in Ahandan Rural District, in the Central District of Lahijan County, Gilan Province, Iran.

At the time of the 2006 National Census, the village's population was 18 in four households. The following census in 2011 counted 12 people in four households. The 2016 census measured the population of the village as seven people in four households.
