= Kateshal-e Pain =

Kateshal-e Pain كتشال پائين
- Village
- Interactive map of Kateshal-e Pain
- Coordinates: 37.175°N 50.031°E
- Country: Iran
- Province: Gilan
- County: Lahijan
- Bakhsh: Central
- Rural District: Layl

Population (2016)
  - Total: 166
- Time zone: UTC+3:30 (IRST)

Kateshal-e Pain (Persian: كتشال پائين, also Romanized as Kateshāl-e Pā’īn) is a village in Layl Rural District, in the Central District of Lahijan County, Gilan Province, Iran.

At the time of the 2006 National Census, the village's population was 166 in 50 households. The following census in 2011 counted 168 people in 58 households. The 2016 census measured the population of the village as 166 people in 63 households.
