= Chahar Khaneh Sar-e Pain =

Chahar Khaneh Sar-e Pain چهارخانه سرپائين
- Suburb, Village
- Location within Iran
- Coordinates: 37°11′51″N 50°01′35″E
- Country: Iran
- Province: Gilan
- County: Lahijan
- Bakhsh: Central
- Rural District: Layalestan

Population (2006)
  - Total: 2,885
- Time zone: UTC+3:30 (IRST)

Chahar Khaneh Sar-e Pain (Persian: چهارخانه سرپائين, also Romanized as Chahār Khāneh Sar-e Pā’īn; also known as Chahār Khāneh Sar) is an eastern suburb of Lahijan city and a village in Layalestan Rural District, in the Central District of Lahijan County, Gilan Province, Iran.

At the time of the 2006 National Census, the village's population was 2,885 in 816 households. The following census in 2011 counted 18 people in 6 households, as most of the residential area of the village was incorporated into Lahijan city's urban area. The 2016 census measured the population of rural part as 17 people in 5 households.
