= Fidarreh-ye Olya =

Village in Gilan province, Iran

Fidarreh-ye Olya Persian: فيدره عليا
- Village
- Location within Iran
- Coordinates: 37°06′49″N 50°02′56″E
- Country: Iran
- Province: Gilan
- County: Lahijan
- District: Central
- Rural District: Layl

Population (2016)
  - Total: 219
- Time zone: UTC+3:30 (IRST)

Fidarreh-ye Olya (Persian: فيدره عليا) (Note: Also romanized as Fidarreh-ye ‘Olyā; formerly known as Bala Fidarreh (بالافيدره), also romanized as Bālā Fīdarreh; also known as Bālā Fedreh and Bālā Fūdarreh) is a village in Layl Rural District of the Central District in Lahijan County, Gilan province, Iran.

== Demographics ==
=== Population ===
At the time of the 2006 National Census, the village's population, as Bala Fidarreh, was 257 in 67 households. The following census in 2011 counted 259 people in 71 households, by which time the village was listed as Fidarreh-ye Olya. The 2016 census measured the population of the village as 219 people in 66 households.
