= Bijar Boneh-ye Pain =

Village in Gilan province, Iran

Bijar Boneh-ye Pain Persian: بيجاربنه پايين
- Village
- Location within Iran
- Coordinates: 37°12′52″N 50°01′32″E
- Country: Iran
- Province: Gilan
- County: Lahijan
- District: Central
- Rural District: Layalestan

Population (2016)
  - Total: 675
- Time zone: UTC+3:30 (IRST)

Bijar Boneh-ye Pain (Persian: بيجاربنه پايين) (Note: Also romanized as Bījār Boneh-ye Pā’īn; also known as Bījār Boneh) is a village in Layalestan Rural District of the Central District in Lahijan County, Gilan province, Iran. The village is located north of the city limits of Lahijan, east of the village of Bijar Boneh-ye Bala.

== Demographics ==
=== Population ===
At the time of the 2006 National Census, the village's population was 512 in 151 households. The following census in 2011 counted 585 people in 182 households. The 2016 census measured the population of the village as 675 people in 226 households.
