= Siah Gurab-e Pain =

Siah Gurab-e Pain سياهگوراب پايين
- Village
- Location within Iran
- Coordinates: 37°13′27″N 50°02′30″E
- Country: Iran
- Province: Gilan
- County: Lahijan
- Bakhsh: Central
- Rural District: Layalestan

Population (2016)
  - Total: 85
- Time zone: UTC+3:30 (IRST)

Siah Gurab-e Pain (Persian: سياهگوراب پايين, also Romanized as Sīāh Gūrāb-e Pā’īn; also known as Seyāh Qorāb, Sīāh Gūrāb, Sīāh Qorāb, and Siyah Gowdab) is a village in Layalestan Rural District, in the Central District of Lahijan County, Gilan Province, Iran.

At the time of the 2006 National Census, the village's population was 84 in 31 households. The following census in 2011 counted 68 people in 26 households. The 2016 census measured the population of the village as 85 people in 34 households.
