= Pain Bijar Ankish =

Pain Bijar Ankish پائين بيجاران كيش
- Village
- Location within Iran
- Coordinates: 37°07′00″N 49°58′09″E
- Country: Iran
- Province: Gilan
- County: Lahijan
- Bakhsh: Central
- Rural District: Ahandan

Population (2006)
  - Total: 16
- Time zone: UTC+3:30 (IRST)

Pain Bijar Ankish (Persian: پائين بيجارانكيش, also Romanized as Pā’īn Bījār Ankīsh; also known as Bījār Ankīsh-e Pā’īn) is a village in Ahandan Rural District, in the Central District of Lahijan County, Gilan Province, Iran.At the time of the 2006 National Census, the village's population was 16 in four households. The following censuses in 2011 and 2016 counted less than 4 households and total population was not reported.
