= Layalestan Rural District =

Rural district in Gilan province, Iran

Layalestan Rural District Persian: دهستان ليالستان
- Rural District
- Location within Iran
- Coordinates: 37°13′N 50°03′E
- Country: Iran
- Province: Gilan
- County: Lahijan
- District: Central
- Established: 1987
- Capital: Layalestan

Population (2016)
  - Total: 9,359
- Time zone: UTC+3:30 (IRST)

Layalestan Rural District (Persian: دهستان ليالستان) is in the Central District of Lahijan County, Gilan province, Iran. Its capital is the village of Layalestan.

== Demographics ==
=== Population ===
At the time of the 2006 National Census, the rural district's population was 12,993 in 3,893 households. There were 13,885 inhabitants in 4,524 households at the following census of 2011. The 2016 census measured the population of the rural district as 9,359 in 3,389 households. The most populous of its 20 villages was Bijar Boneh-ye Bala, with 2,136 people.

=== Other villages in the rural district ===
- Alaki Sahra
- Bijar Basteh Sar
- Bijar Boneh-ye Pain
- Chahar Khaneh Sar-e Pain
- Dizbon
- Gurandan
- Kuchek Deh
- Kushal
- Lashidan-e Motlaq
- Motaalleq Mahalleh-ye Nowbijar
- Nakhjir Kolayeh
- Nowbijar
- Qassab Mahalleh
- Sapahar Posht
- Sheykhanbar
- Siah Gurab-e Bala
- Siah Gurab-e Pain
