= Ahandan Rural District =

Rural district in Gilan province, Iran

Ahandan Rural District Persian: دهستان آهندان
- Rural District
- Location within Iran
- Coordinates: 37°09′N 50°00′E
- Country: Iran
- Province: Gilan
- County: Lahijan
- District: Central
- Established: 1987
- Capital: Ahandan

Population (2016)
  - Total: 9,459
- Time zone: UTC+3:30 (IRST)

Ahandan Rural District (Persian: دهستان آهندان) is in the Central District of Lahijan County, Gilan province, Iran. Its capital is the village of Ahandan.

== Demographics ==
=== Population ===
At the time of the 2006 National Census, the rural district's population was 11,859 in 3,270 households. There were 8,716 inhabitants in 2,807 households at the following census of 2011. The 2016 census measured the population of the rural district as 9,459 in 3,036 households. The most populous of its 40 villages was Kuh Boneh, with 1,630 people.

=== Other villages in the rural district ===
- Azarestan
- Azarsetanaki
- Bala Bijar Ankish
- Bala Tamushal
- Bandbon-e Bala
- Bandbon-e Pain
- Bilazh Mahalleh
- Bujayeh
- Chamandan
- Chichi Nikuti
- Darreh Jir
- Dehsar
- Dozdaksu
- Gerd-e Kuh
- Golestan
- Halukhani
- Jir Gavabar
- Khortab
- Khurtay
- Kureh Bar
- Lavasi Mahalleh
- Lialeman
- Mazi Kalleh
- Mian Gavaber
- Mian Mahalleh-ye Zakleh Bar
- Molla Mahalleh-ye Chehel Setun
- Pain Bijar Ankish
- Pain Narenj Lengeh
- Pain Tamushal
- Qazi Gavaber
- Rahdar Khaneh
- Sadat Mahalleh
- Salehbar
- Sharam Lengeh
- Sukhteh Kuh
