= Bijar Boneh-ye Bala =

Village in Gilan province, Iran

Bijar Boneh-ye Bala Persian: بيجار بنه بالا
- Village
- Location within Iran
- Coordinates: 37°13′11″N 50°00′31″E
- Country: Iran
- Province: Gilan
- County: Lahijan
- District: Central
- Rural District: Layalestan

Population (2016)
  - Total: 2,136
- Time zone: UTC+3:30 (IRST)

Bijar Boneh-ye Bala (Persian: بيجار بنه بالا) (Note: Also romanized as Bījār Boneh-ye Bālā; also known as Bījār Boneh) is a village in Layalestan Rural District of the Central District in Lahijan County, Gilan province, Iran.

== Demographics ==
=== Population ===
At the time of the 2006 National Census, the village's population was 1,230 in 360 households. The following census in 2011 counted 1,777 people in 564 households. The 2016 census measured the population of the village as 2,136 people in 704 households. It was the most populous village in its rural district.
