= Layl Rural District =

Rural district in Gilan province, Iran

Layl Rural District Persian: دهستان ليل
- Rural District
- Location within Iran
- Coordinates: 37°08′N 50°03′E
- Country: Iran
- Province: Gilan
- County: Lahijan
- District: Central
- Established: 1987
- Capital: Satlsar

Population (2016)
  - Total: 8,077
- Time zone: UTC+3:30 (IRST)

Layl Rural District (Persian: دهستان ليل) is in the Central District of Lahijan County, Gilan province, Iran. Its capital is the village of Satlsar.

== Demographics ==
=== Population ===
At the time of the 2006 National Census, the rural district's population was 12,183 in 3,523 households. There were 8,908 inhabitants in 2,784 households at the following census of 2011. The 2016 census measured the population of the rural district as 8,077 people in 2,770 households. The most populous of the rural district's 41 villages was Sustan, with 2,336 residents.

=== Other villages in the rural district ===
- Ali Sorud
- Amir Kalayeh
- Bala Mahalleh-ye Zemidan
- Bangebar
- Bijar Bagh
- Chahar Khaneh Sar-e Bala
- Chalak
- Dangayeh
- Fidarreh-ye Olya
- Garmabrud
- Gerd Geraf
- Golkesh
- Gomol
- Gomol Sara
- Kahbijar
- Kateshal-e Bala
- Kateshal-e Pain
- Kord Gavar
- Kuhbijar
- Kureh
- Mishkasar
- Morad Dahandeh
- Narenj Kelayeh
- Pain Fidarreh
- Pain Gomol
- Pain Mahalleh-ye Zemidan
- Rahimabad
- Rajab Sara
- Ramezan Bijar
- Sar Cheshmeh
- Sarash
- Sattarabad
- Shirin Nesa
- Siah Kash
- Siah Rudbar
- Tanazarud
- Tusowdasht
- Zemidan
- Zemidan Sara
