= Motaalleq Mahalleh-ye Arbastan =

Motaalleq Mahalleh-ye Arbastan متعلق محله ارباستان
- Village
- Location within Iran
- Coordinates: 37°12′28″N 50°06′44″E
- Country: Iran
- Province: Gilan
- County: Lahijan
- Bakhsh: Rudboneh
- Rural District: Shirju Posht

Population (2006)
  - Total: 72
- Time zone: UTC+3:30 (IRST)
  - Summer (DST): UTC+4:30 (IRDT)

Motaalleq Mahalleh-ye Arbastan (Persian: متعلق محله ارباستان, also Romanized as Mota‘alleq Maḩalleh-ye Ārbāstān; also known as Mota‘alleq Maḩalleh-ye Langerūd) is a village in Shirju Posht Rural District, Rudboneh District, Lahijan County, Gilan Province, Iran. At the 2006 census, its population was 72, in 25 families.
