= Bandbon-e Beneksar =

Bandbon-e Beneksar بندبن بنكسر
- Village
- Location within Iran
- Coordinates: 37°00′34″N 50°18′31″E
- Country: Iran
- Province: Gilan
- County: Rudsar
- Bakhsh: Rahimabad
- Rural District: Rahimabad

Population (2016)
  - Total: 219
- Time zone: UTC+3:30 (IRST)

Bandbon-e Beneksar (Persian: بندبن بنكسر) is a village in Rahimabad Rural District, Rahimabad District, Rudsar County, Gilan Province, Iran. At the 2016 census, its population was 219, in 73 families. Up from 206 in 2006.
