= Band Bon, Tonekabon =

Band Bon بندبن
- Village
- Location within Iran
- Coordinates: 36°42′01″N 51°00′44″E
- Country: Iran
- Province: Mazandaran
- County: Tonekabon
- Bakhsh: Nashta
- Rural District: Tameshkol

Population (2016)
  - Total: 209
- Time zone: UTC+3:30 (IRST)

Band Bon (Persian: بندبن; also known as Bandbon-e Asadollāh) is a village in Tameshkol Rural District, Nashta District, Tonekabon County, Mazandaran Province, Iran. At the 2006 census, its population was 248, in 63 families. In 2016 its population was 209, in 66 households.
