= Lafmejan Rural District =

Rural district in Gilan province, Iran

Lafmejan Rural District Persian: دهستان لفمجان
- Rural District
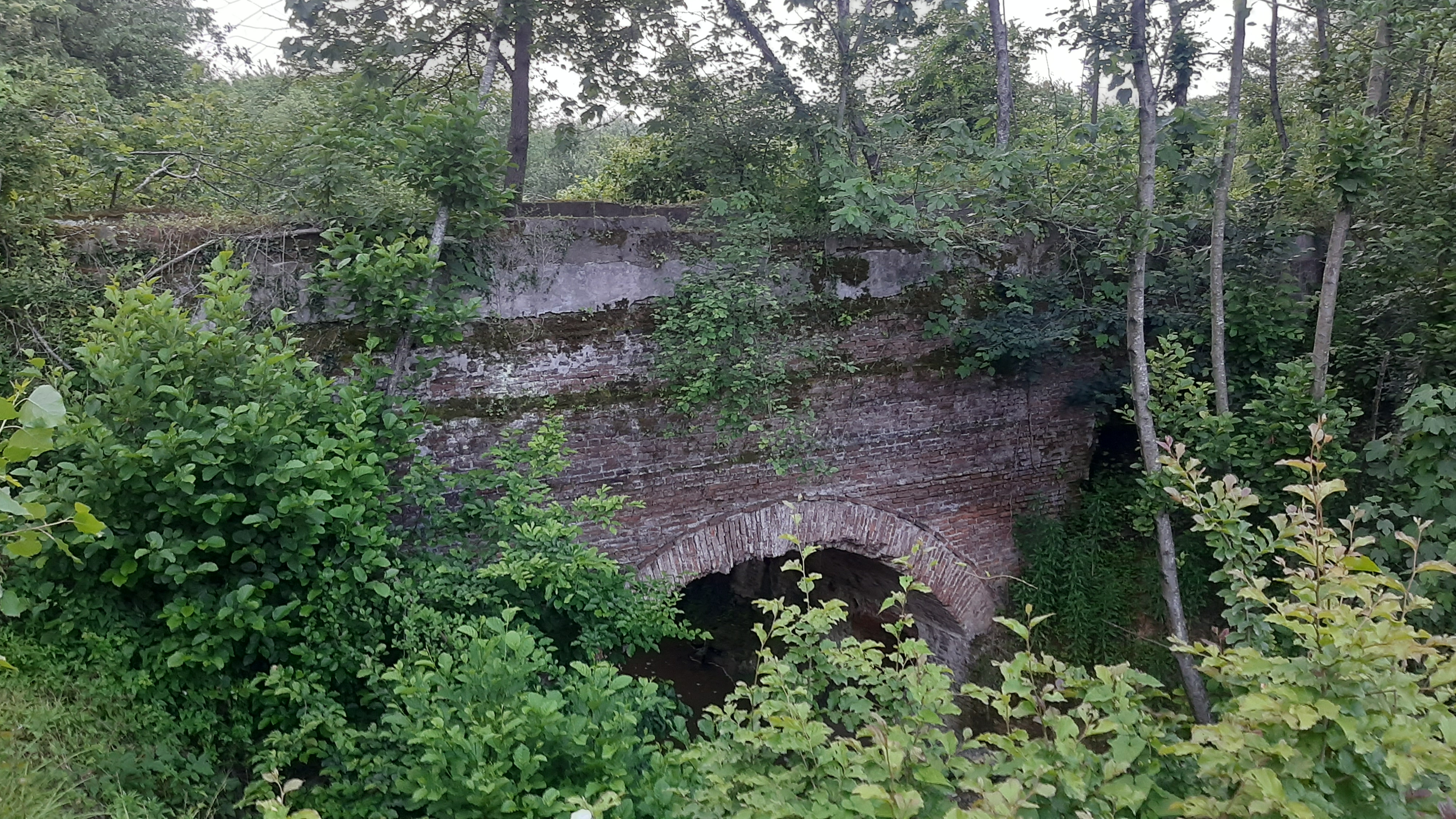
- Clay bridge of Pashaki

- Location within Iran
- Coordinates: 37°12′N 49°52′E
- Country: Iran
- Province: Gilan
- County: Lahijan
- District: Central
- Established: 1987
- Capital: Bazarsar-e Lafmejan

Population (2016)
  - Total: 4,721
- Time zone: UTC+3:30 (IRST)

Lafmejan Rural District (Persian: دهستان لفمجان) is in the Central District of Lahijan County, Gilan province, Iran. Its capital is the village of Bazarsar-e Lafmejan.

== Demographics ==
=== Population ===
At the time of the 2006 National Census, the rural district's population was 6,353 in 2,132 households. There were 5,529 inhabitants in 2,054 households at the following census of 2011. The 2016 census measured the population of the rural district as 4,721 in 1,877 households. The most populous of its 19 villages was Bala Mahalleh-ye Pashaki, with 1,154 people.

=== Other villages in the rural district ===
- Bala Mahalleh-ye Lafmejan
- Bala Shad Deh
- Bazar Deh
- Bijar Boneh
- Gukeh
- Gushkejan
- Jowpish
- Khubdeh
- Kia Sara
- Kolangaran
- Kord Mahalleh
- Lahashar
- Lamak Mahalleh-ye Lafmejan
- Pain Mahalleh-ye Lafmejan
- Pain Mahalleh-ye Pashaki
- Pain Shad Deh
- Shiva
