= Band-e Bon, Gilan =

Band-e Bon بندبن
- Village
- Location within Iran
- Coordinates: 36°51′49″N 49°49′19″E
- Country: Iran
- Province: Gilan
- County: Siahkal
- Bakhsh: Deylaman
- Rural District: Deylaman

Population (2016)
  - Total: 82
- Time zone: UTC+3:30 (IRST)

Band-e Bon (Persian: بندبن, also Romanized as Band Bon; also known as Band Bonak, Bandebun, Estakhr-e Kīān, and Esţalakh Kīān) is a village in Deylaman Rural District, Deylaman District, Siahkal County, Gilan Province, Iran. At the 2016 census, its population was 82, in 32 families. Up from 74 in 2006.
