= Bandbon-e Kabud Tabar =

Bandbon-e Kabud Tabar بندبن كبودتبار
- Village
- Interactive map of Bandbon-e Kabud Tabar
- Coordinates: 36°18′39.116″N 52°38′39.709″E
- Country: Iran
- Province: Mazandaran
- County: Babol
- Bakhsh: Bandpey-ye Sharqi
- Rural District: Sajjadrud

Population (2006)
  - Total: 23
- Time zone: UTC+3:30 (IRST)

Bandbon-e Kabud Tabar (Persian: بندبن كبودتبار, also Romanized as Bandbon-e Kabūd Tabār) is a village in Sajjadrud Rural District, Bandpey-ye Sharqi District, Babol County, Mazandaran Province, Iran. At the 2006 census, its population was 23, in 4 families. In 2016, the village had no residents.
