= Gurandan, Hormozgan =

Gurandan گوراندان
- Village
- Location within Iran
- Coordinates: 27°38′16″N 55°35′47″E
- Country: Iran
- Province: Hormozgan
- County: Bandar Abbas
- Bakhsh: Fin
- Rural District: Fin

Population (2006)
  - Total: 68
- Time zone: UTC+3:30 (IRST)
  - Summer (DST): UTC+4:30 (IRDT)

Gurandan (Persian: گوراندان, also Romanized as Gūrandān) is a village in Fin Rural District, Fin District, Bandar Abbas County, Hormozgan Province, Iran. At the 2006 census, its population was 68, in 13 families.
