= Lahash International =

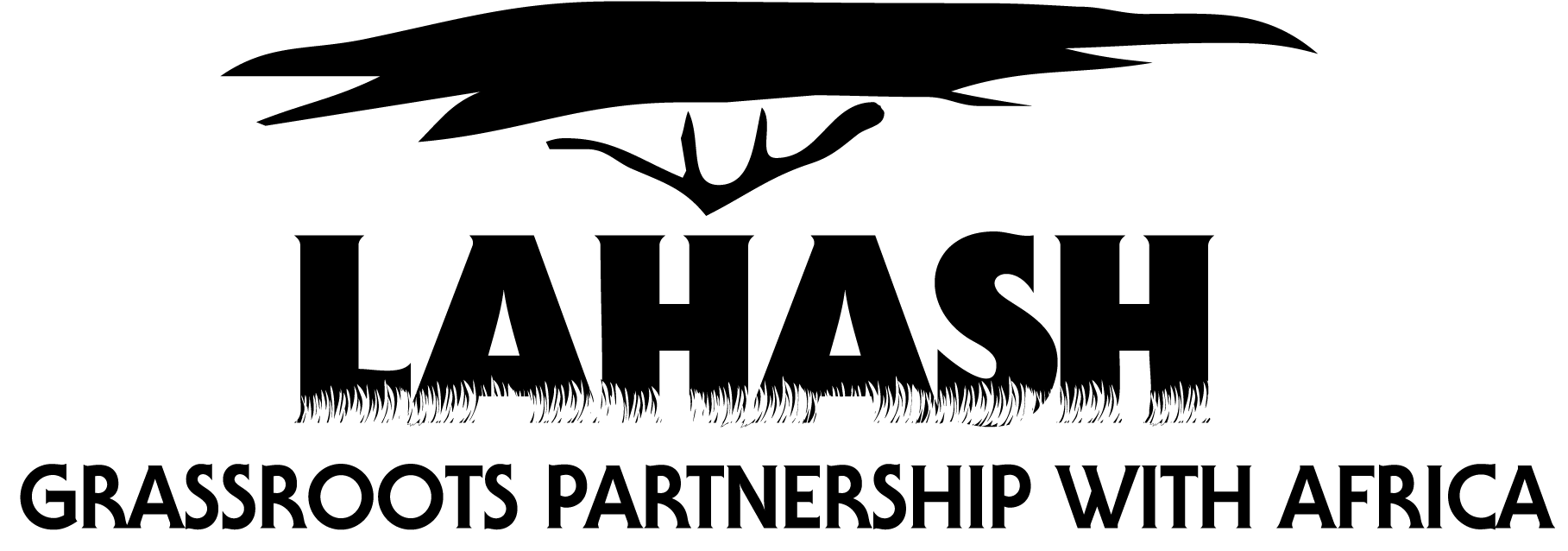
- Founded: 2005
- Founder: Daniel Holcomb
- Type: Christian child sponsorship non-profit organization
- Tax ID no.: 20-4787434
- Location(s): 1315 SE 20th Ave; Portland, OR 97214; United States
- Region served: 4 Countries
- Employees: 9
- Volunteers: 50
- Website: www.lahash.org

Lahash International is a Christian organization working in East Africa. Lahash works to help vulnerable children in communities affected by war, disease, and corruption. The work is accomplished through partnerships with existing East African churches and ministries that have a vision for serving vulnerable kids in a holistic manner. Lahash currently sponsors 450 children in Uganda, Kenya, Tanzania, and Rwanda.

Child Sponsorship is the primary method of securing long-term international support for the work in East Africa. An office in Portland, Oregon is the headquarters of the organization. The ministry has also created a month-long experiential event called Rice & Beans Month. This month offers an opportunity to the international community to pare back meal budgets for a month in order to share savings with people in East Africa who are facing nutritional shortages.

A book was written in 2011 by Lyla Peterson about the journey of the organization and the partnership with Susan Tabia and her ministry in South Sudan and Uganda to the Sudanese.

== History ==
The Lahash team visits with partners in Shinyanga, Tanzania

Lahash was founded by Daniel Holcomb and several friends in 2005. A few years earlier, in 2002, Daniel had visited Northern Uganda and encountered the Amazing Grace Children's Home. The South Sudanese at the home asked Daniel if he would partner with them in their work of serving vulnerable refugee children. He agreed and began to partner with several additional ministries across East Africa.

Over the years Lahash has served many disadvantaged communities. For several years the organization partnered with Mama Margaret Nyabuto at the Tenderfeet School.

== Leadership ==
Daniel Holcomb, the founder and Executive Director, lives in Oregon with his wife, Erin, and three children.

== Servant Team Program ==
Lahash facilitates a discipleship and service program each year called Servant Teams. While participating in the program, several young adults enter into a time of classroom learning, serving Portland, Oregon neighborhoods and churches, and serving in East Africa with the ministries that Lahash partners with.
