= Bandbon, Babol =

Bandbon بندبن
- Village
- Interactive map of Bandbon
- Coordinates: 36°18′14.189″N 52°40′20.99″E
- Country: Iran
- Province: Mazandaran
- County: Babol
- Bakhsh: Bandpey-ye Sharqi
- Rural District: Sajjadrud

Population (2016)
  - Total: 392
- Time zone: UTC+3:30 (IRST)

Bandbon (Persian: بندبن) is a village in Sajjadrud Rural District, Bandpey-ye Sharqi District, Babol County, Mazandaran Province, Iran. At the 2016 census, its population was 392, in 115 families. Increased from 227 people in 2006.
