= Central District (Lahijan County) =

District in Gilan province, Iran

Central District (Lahijan County) Persian: بخش مرکزی شهرستان لاهیجان
- District
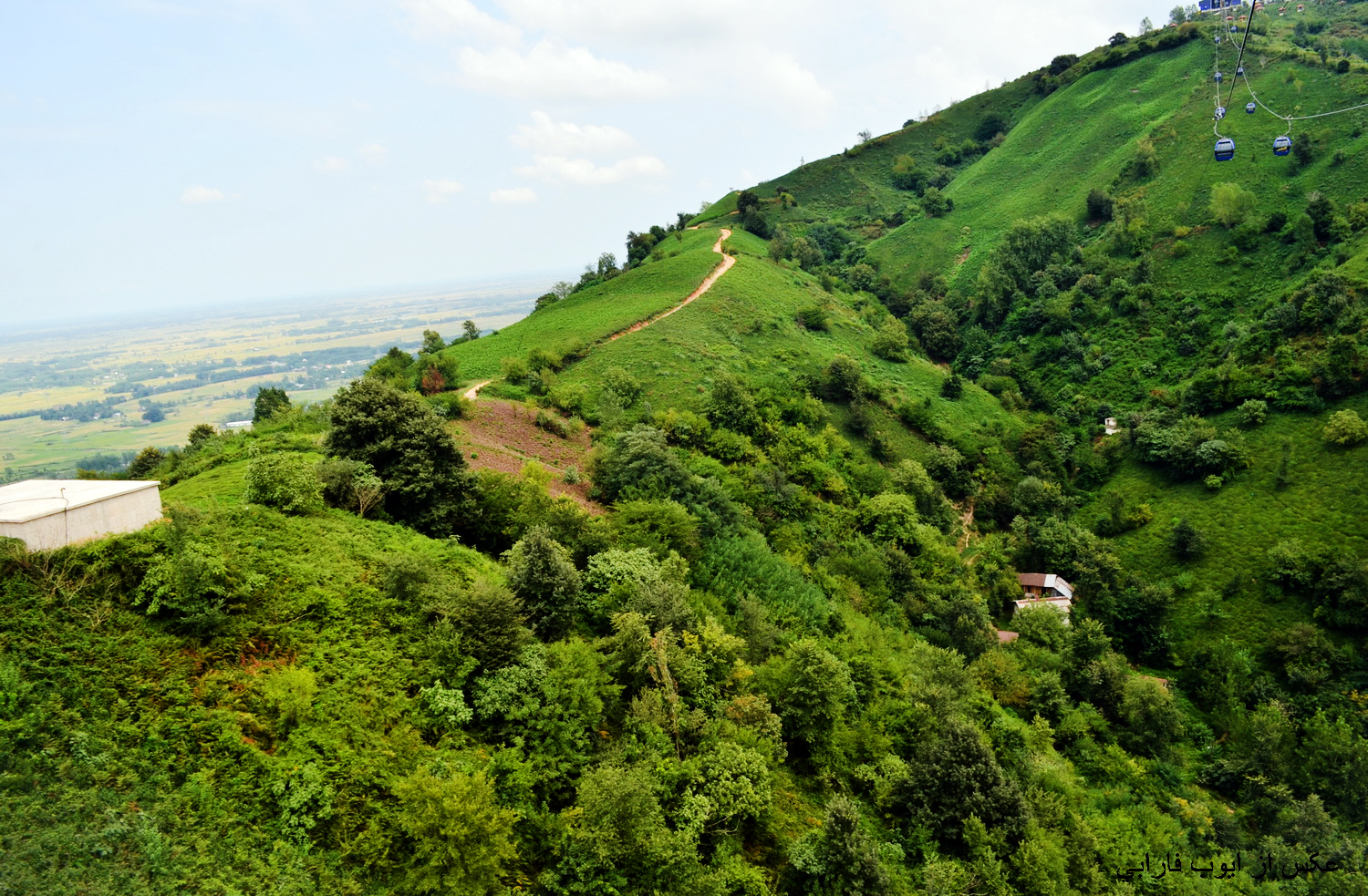

- Location within Iran
- Coordinates: 37°10′N 49°56′E
- Country: Iran
- Province: Gilan
- County: Lahijan
- Capital: Lahijan

Population (2016)
  - Total: 144,292
- Time zone: UTC+3:30 (IRST)

The Central District of Lahijan County (Persian: بخش مرکزی شهرستان لاهیجان) is in northwestern Iran's Gilan province. Its capital is the city of Lahijan.

== Demographics ==
=== Population ===
At the 2006 National Census, the district's population was 130,288 in 38,766 households. The census in 2011 recorded 143,478 people in 46,681 households, while the 2016 census reported the population of the district as 144,292 inhabitants in 49,729 households.

=== Administrative divisions ===
Central District (Lahijan County) Population
Administrative Divisions	2006	2011	2016
Ahandan RD	11,859	8,716	9,459
Baz Kia Gurab RD	15,029	12,389	11,603
Lafmejan RD	6,353	5,529	4,721
Layalestan RD	12,993	13,885	9,359
Layl RD	12,183	8,908	8,077
Lahijan (city)	71,871	94,051	101,073
Total	130,288	143,478	144,292
RD = Rural District
