= Lahijan County =

County in Gilan province, Iran

Lahijan County Persian: شهرستان لاهیجان
- County
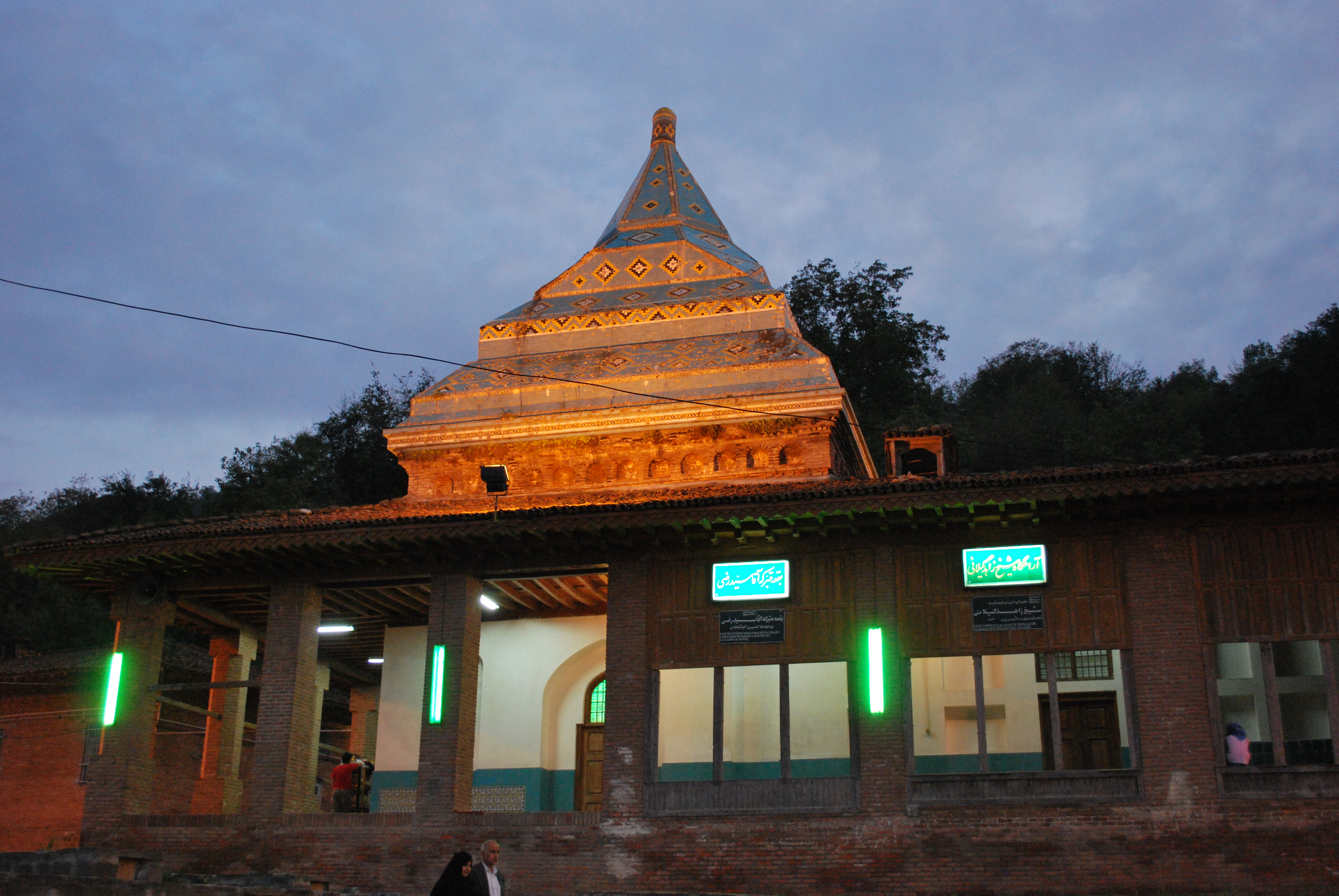
- Sheikh Zahed tomb

- Location of Lahijan County in Gilan province (center right, purple)

- Location of Gilan province in Iran
- Coordinates: 37°14′N 50°02′E
- Country: Iran
- Province: Gilan
- Capital: Lahijan
- Districts: Central, Rudboneh

Population (2016)
  - Total: 167,544
- Time zone: UTC+3:30 (IRST)

Lahijan County (Persian: شهرستان لاهیجان) is in Gilan province, in northwestern Iran. Its capital is the city of Lahijan.

== Demographics ==
=== Population ===
At the time of the 2006 National Census, the county's population was 161,491 in 48,075 households. The following census in 2011 counted 168,829 people in 55,174 households. The 2016 census measured the population of the county as 167,544 in 58,378 households.

=== Administrative divisions ===
Lahijan County's population history and administrative structure over three consecutive censuses are shown in the following table.

Lahijan County Population
Administrative Divisions	2006	2011	2016
Central District	130,288	143,478	144,292
Ahandan RD	11,859	8,716	9,459
Baz Kia Gurab RD	15,029	12,389	11,603
Lafmejan RD	6,353	5,529	4,721
Layalestan RD	12,993	13,885	9,359
Layl RD	12,183	8,908	8,077
Lahijan (city)	71,871	94,051	101,073
Rudboneh District	31,203	25,351	23,252
Rudboneh RD	11,893	7,598	6,858
Shirju Posht RD	15,716	14,107	12,953
Rudboneh (city)	3,594	3,646	3,441
Total	161,491	168,829	167,544
RD = Rural District

== See also ==
Media related to Lahijan County at Wikimedia Commons
