= Earth structure =

Building or other structure made largely from soil

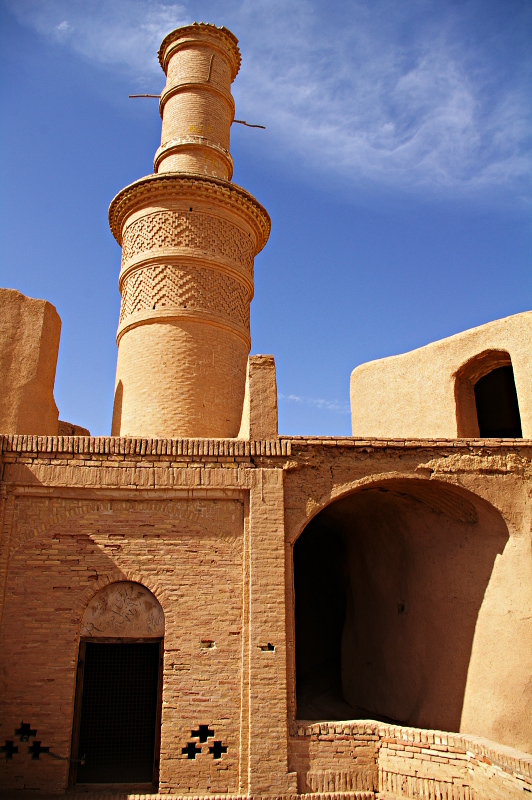
Old adobe minaret in Kharanagh village, Iran

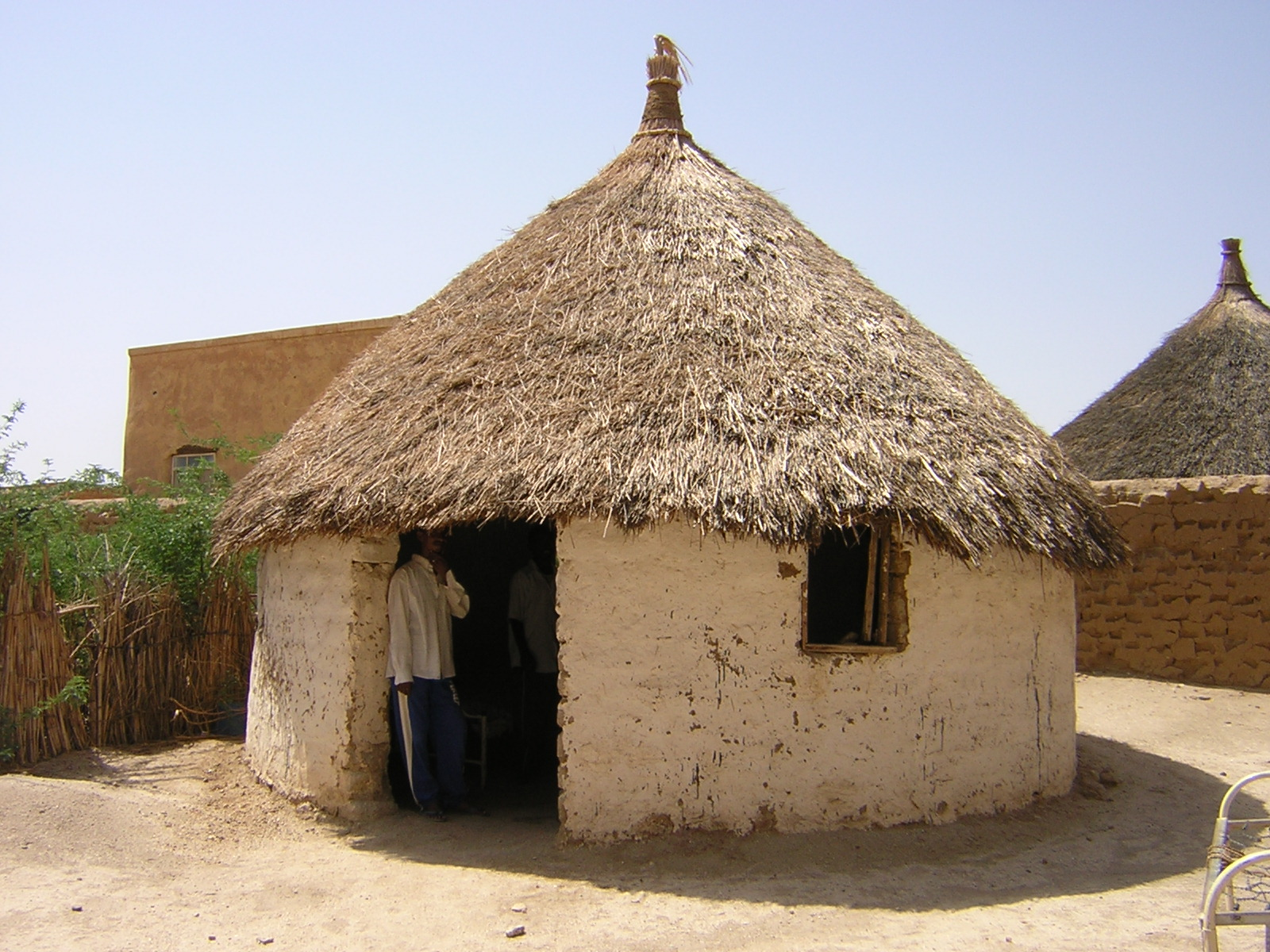
Earthen hut with thatched roof in Toteil, near Kassala, Sudan

An earth structure is a building or other structure made largely from soil. Since soil is a widely available material, it has been used in construction since prehistory. It may be combined with other materials, compressed and/or baked to add strength.

Soil is still an economical material for many applications, and may have low environmental impact both during and after construction.

Earth structure materials may be as simple as mud, or mud mixed with straw to make cob. Sturdy dwellings may be also built from sod or turf. Soil may be stabilized by the addition of lime or cement, and may be compacted into rammed earth. Construction is faster with pre-formed adobe or mudbricks, compressed earth blocks, earthbags or fired clay bricks. (Note: Fired bricks and concrete are derived from earth, but structures built from these materials are usually not considered earth structures.)

Types of earth structure include earth shelters, where a dwelling is wholly or partly embedded in the ground or encased in soil. Native American earth lodges are examples. Wattle and daub houses use a "wattle" of poles interwoven with sticks to provide stability for mud walls. Sod houses were built on the northwest coast of Europe, and later by European settlers on the North American prairies. Adobe or mud-brick buildings are built around the world and include houses, apartment buildings, mosques and churches. Fujian Tulous are large fortified rammed earth buildings in southeastern China that shelter as many as 80 families. Other types of earth structure include mounds and pyramids used for religious purposes, levees, mechanically stabilized earth retaining walls, forts, trenches and embankment dams.

== Soil ==
Soil types by clay, silt and sand composition as used by the USDA

Soil is created from rock that has been chemically or physically weathered, transported, deposited and precipitated. Soil particles include sand, silt and clay. Sand particles are the largest at 2 to 0.05 millimetres (0.0787 to 0.0020 in) in diameter and clay the smallest at less than 0.002 millimetres (7.9×10^{−5} in) in diameter. Both sand and silt are mostly inert rock particles, including quartz, calcite, feldspar and mica.

Clays typically are phyllosilicate minerals with a sheet-like structure. The very small clay particles interact with each other physically and chemically. Even a small proportion of clay affects the physical properties of the soil much more than might be expected. Clays such as kaolinite do not expand or contract when wetted or dried, and are useful for brick-making. Others, such as smectites, expand or contract considerably when wet or dry, and are not suitable for building.

Loam is a mix of sand, silt and clay in which none predominates. Soils are given different names depending on the relative proportions of sand, silt and clay such as "Silt Loam", "Clay Loam" and "Silty Clay". Loam construction, the subject of this article, referred to as adobe construction when it uses unfired clay bricks, is an ancient building technology. It was used in the early civilizations of the Mediterranean, Egypt and Mesopotamia, in the Indus, Ganges and Yellow river valleys, in Central and South America. As of 2005 about 1.5 billion people lived in houses built of loam. (Note: One source estimates that as many as three billion people live in earth buildings.)

In recent years, interest in loam construction has revived in the developed world. It is seen as a way to minimize use of fossil fuels and pollution, particularly carbon dioxide, during manufacture, and to create a comfortable living environment through the high mass and high absorption of the material. The two main technologies are stamped or rammed earth, clay or loam, called pise de terre in French, and adobe, typically using sun-dried bricks made of a mud and straw mixture. (Note: The word "adobe" is derived from the ancient Egyptian "tob", meaning "brick". The Arabs adopted the word as "at-tub" or "attuba", and the Spanish made this "adobe".)

== Materials ==
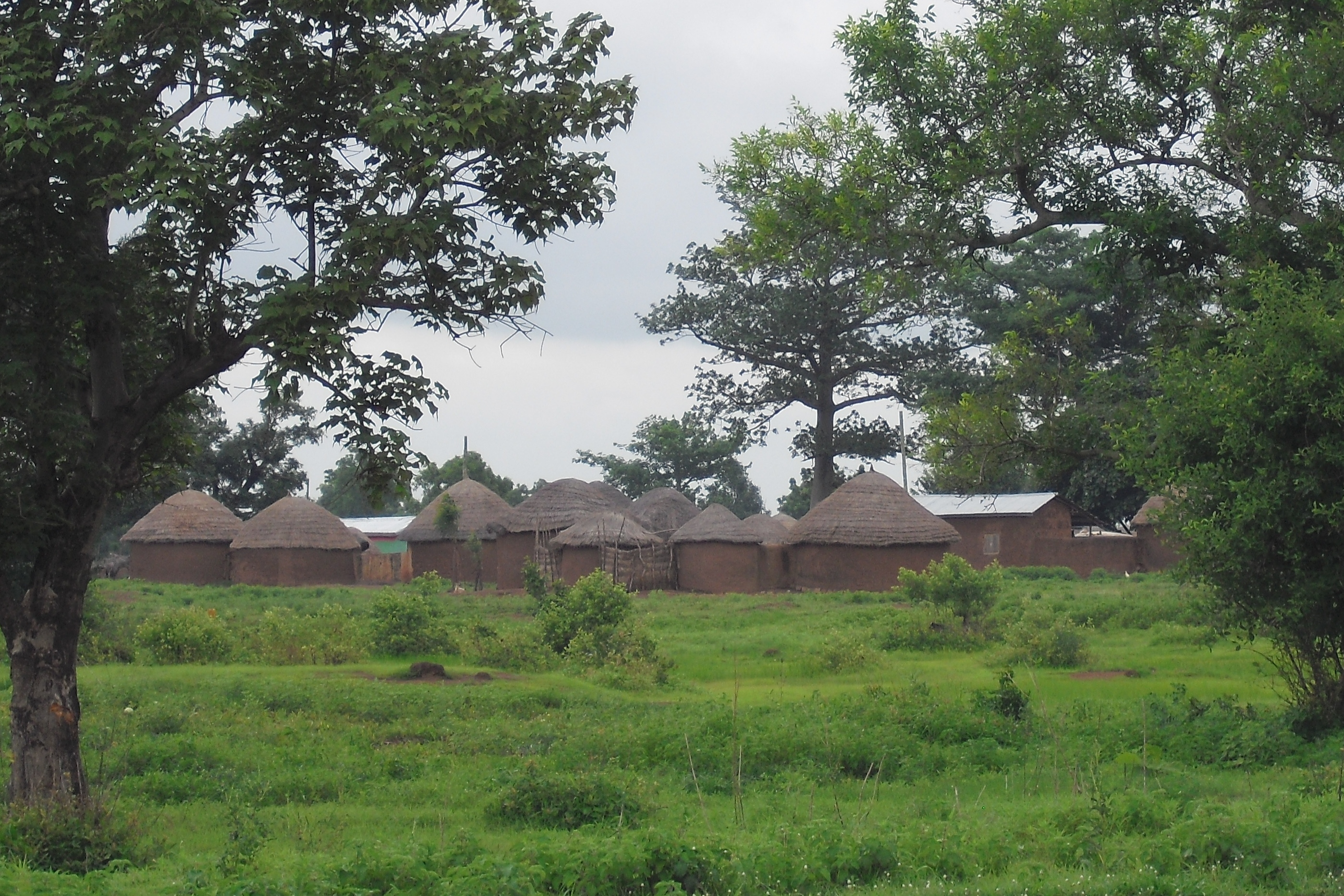
Traditional round mud and thatch houses forming a family compound near Tamale, Ghana

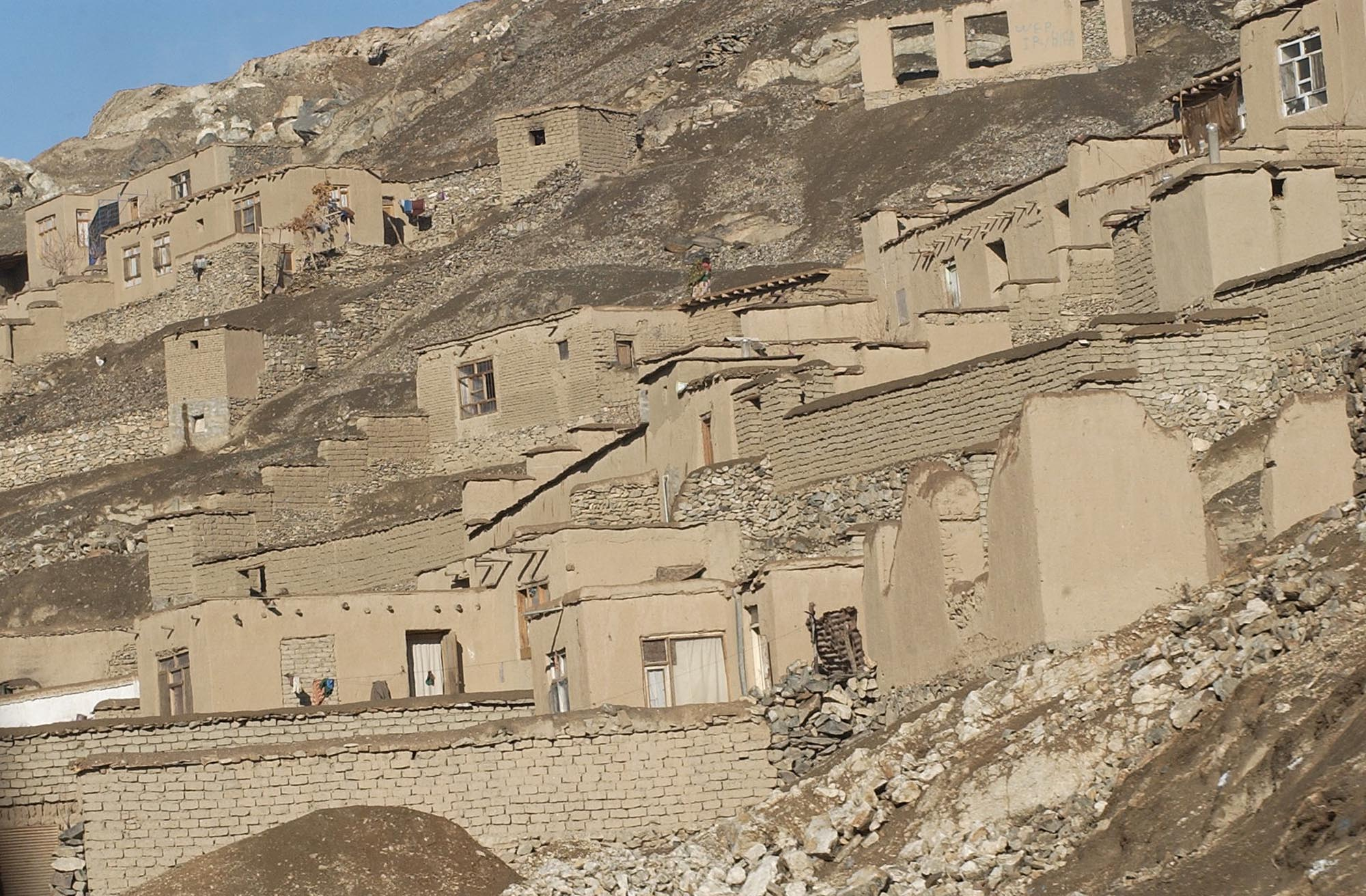
Mud houses in Kandahar, Afghanistan

Earth usually requires some sort of processing for use in construction. It may be combined with water to make mud, straw may be added, some form of stabilizing material such as lime or cement may be used to harden the earth, and the earth may be compacted to increase strength.

=== Mud ===
Coursed mud construction is one of the oldest approaches to building walls. Moist mud is formed by hand to make the base of a wall, and allowed to dry. More mud is added and allowed to dry to form successive courses until the wall is complete. With puddled mud, a hand-made mud form is filled with wetter mud and allowed to dry. In Iran, puddled mud walls are called chine construction. Each course is about 18 to 24 inches (460 to 610 mm) thick, and about 18 to 24 inches (460 to 610 mm) high. Typically the technique is used for garden walls but not for house construction, presumably because of concern about the strength of walls made in this way. A disadvantage to the approach is that a lot of time can be spent waiting for each course to dry. Another technique, used in areas where wood is plentiful, is to build a wood-frame house and to infill it with mud, primarily to provide insulation. In parts of England a similar technique was used with cob.

=== Cob ===
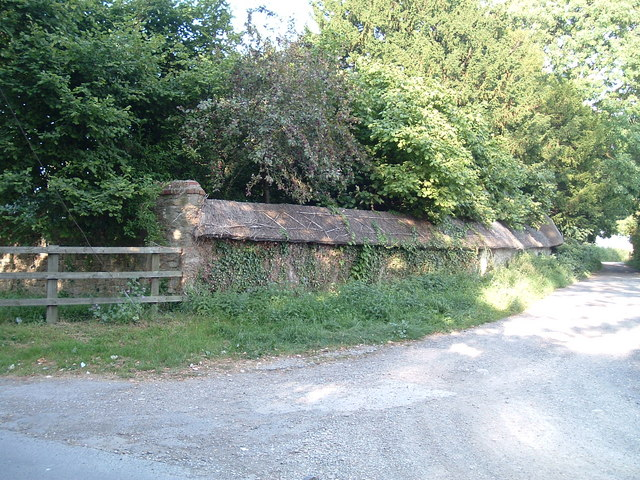
Cob wall in Harwell, Oxfordshire, England, hundreds of years old, thatched to protect it from water

Cob, sometimes referred to as "monolithic adobe", is a natural building material made from soil that includes clay, sand or small stones and an organic material such as straw. Cob walls are usually built up in courses, have no mortar joints and need 30% or more clay in the soil. Cob can be used as in-fill in post-and-beam buildings, but is often used for load bearing walls, and can bear up to two stories. A cob wall should be at least 16 inches (410 mm) thick, and the ratio of width to height should be no more than one to ten. It will typically be plastered inside and out with a mix of lime, soil and sand. Cob is fireproof, and its thermal mass helps stabilize indoor temperatures. Tests have shown that cob has some resistance to seismic activity. However, building codes in the developed world may not recognize cob as an approved material.

=== Sod or turf ===
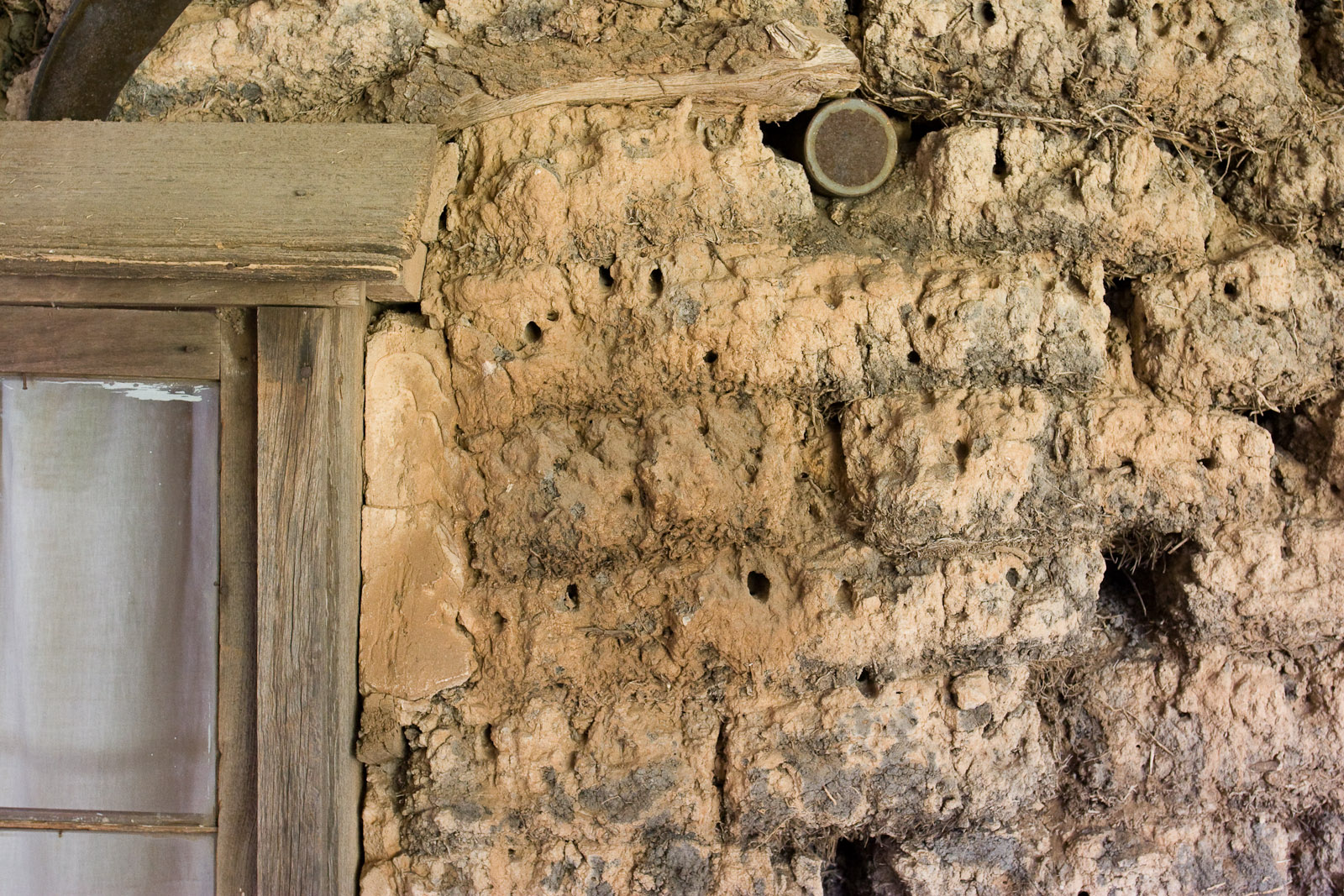
Sod bricks in a house wall

Cut sod bricks, called terrone in Spanish, can be used to make tough and durable walls. The sod is cut from soil that has a heavy mat of grass roots, which may be found in river bottom lands. It is stood on edge to dry before being used in construction. European settlers on the North American Prairies found that the sod least likely to deteriorate due to freezing or rain came from dried sloughs. Turf was once extensively used for the walls of houses in Ireland, Scotland and Iceland, where some turf houses may still be found. A turf house may last fifty years or longer if well-maintained in a cold climate. The Icelanders find that the best quality turf is the Strengur, the top 5 centimetres (2.0 in) of the grass turf.

=== Stabilized earth ===
Clay is usually hard and strong when dry, but becomes very soft when it absorbs water. The dry clay helps hold an earth wall together, but if the wall is directly exposed to rain, or to water leaking down from the roof, it may become saturated. Earth may be "stabilized" to make it more weather resistant. The practice of stabilizing earth by adding burnt lime is centuries old. Portland cement or bitumen may also be added to earth intended for construction which adds strength, although the stabilized earth is not as strong as fired clay or concrete. Mixtures of cement and lime, or pozzolana and lime, may also be used for stabilization.

Preferably the sand content of the soil will be 65% – 75%. Soils with low clay content, or with no more than 15% non-expansive clay, are suitable for stabilized earth. The clay percentage may be reduced by adding sand, if available. If there is more than 15% clay it may take more than 10% cement to stabilize the soil, which adds to the cost. If earth contains little clay and holds 10% or more cement, it is in effect concrete. Cement is not particularly environmentally friendly, since the manufacturing process generates large amounts of carbon dioxide. Low-density stabilized earth will be porous and weak. The earth must therefore be compacted either by a machine that makes blocks or within the wall using the "rammed earth" technique.

=== Rammed earth ===
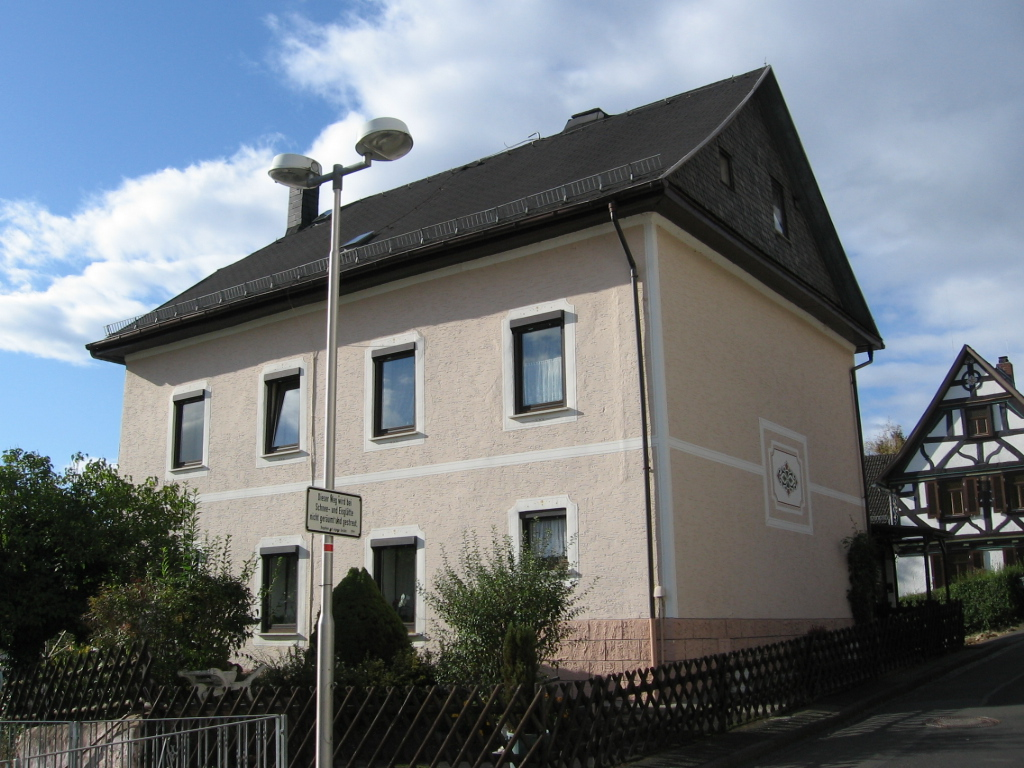
Old school built of rammed earth in 1836–37 in Bonbaden, Hesse, Germany

Rammed earth is a technique for building walls using natural raw materials such as earth, chalk, lime or gravel. A rammed earth wall is built by placing damp soil in a temporary form. The soil is manually or mechanically compacted and then the form is removed. Rammed earth is generally made without much water, and so does not need much time to dry as the building rises. It is susceptible to moisture, so must be laid on a course that stops rising dampness, must be roofed or covered to keep out water from above, and may need protection through some sort of plaster, paint or sheathing.

In China, rammed earth walls were built by the Longshan people in 2600–1900 BC, during the period when cities first appeared in the region. Thick sloping walls made of rammed earth became a characteristic of traditional Buddhist monasteries throughout the Himalayas and became very common in northern Indian areas such as Sikkim. The technique spread to the Middle East, and to North Africa, and the city of Carthage was built of rammed earth. From there the technology was brought to Europe by the Romans. Rammed earth structures may be long lasting. Most of the Great Wall of China was made from rammed earth, as was the Alhambra in the Kingdom of Granada. In Northern Europe there are rammed earth buildings up to seven stories high and two hundred years old.

=== Concrete ===
The Romans made durable concrete strong enough for load-bearing walls. Roman concrete contains a rubble of broken bricks and rocks set in mortar. The mortar included lime and pozzolana, a volcanic material that contributed significantly to its strength. Roman concrete structures such as the Colosseum, completed in 80 AD, still stand. Their longevity may be explained by the fact that the builders used a relatively dry mix of mortar and aggregate and compacted it by pounding it down to eliminate air pockets. Although derived from earth products, concrete structures would not usually be considered earth structures.

== Building units ==
=== Mud brick or adobe brick ===
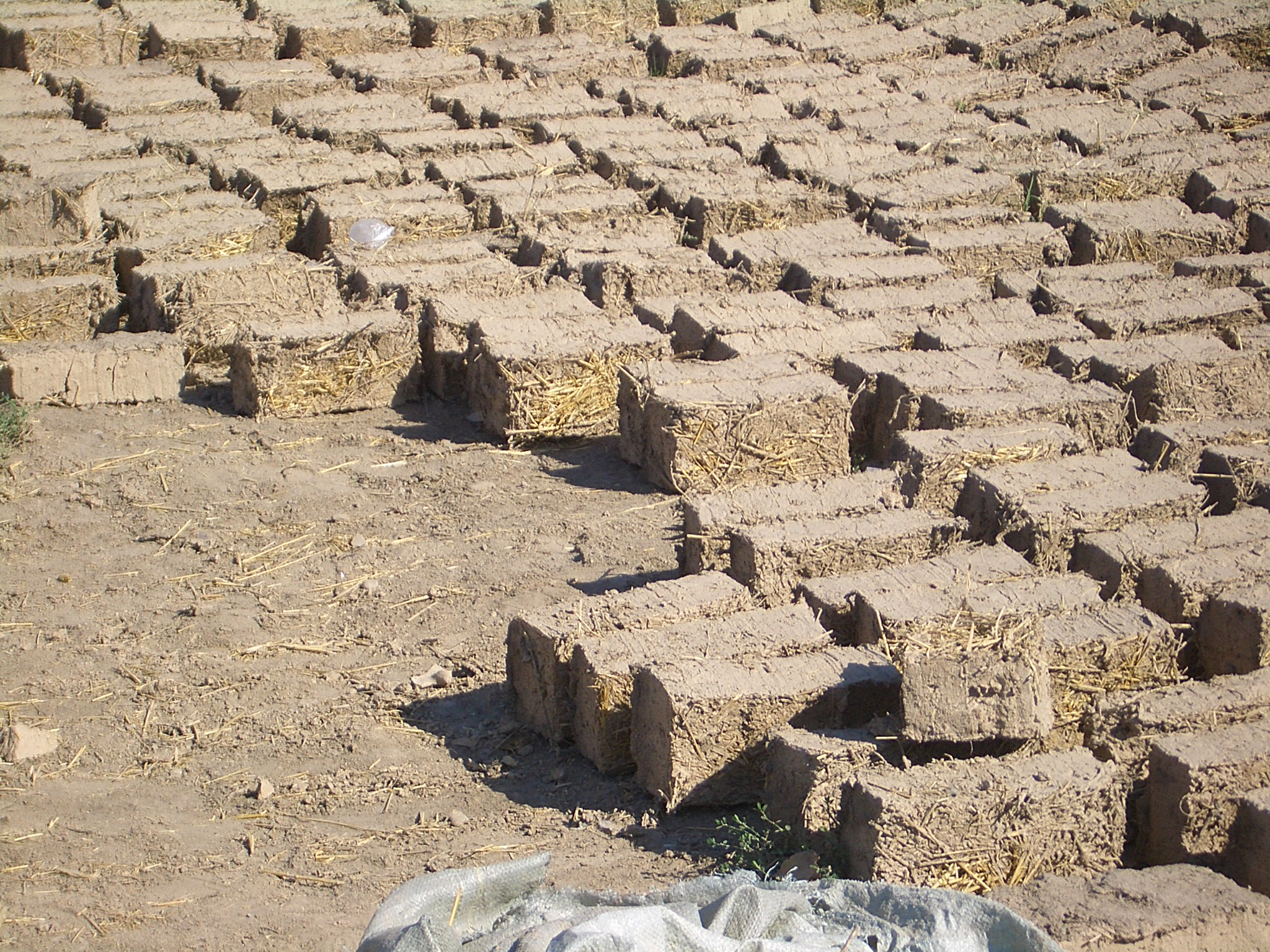
Adobe bricks near a construction site in Milyanfan, Kyrgyzstan

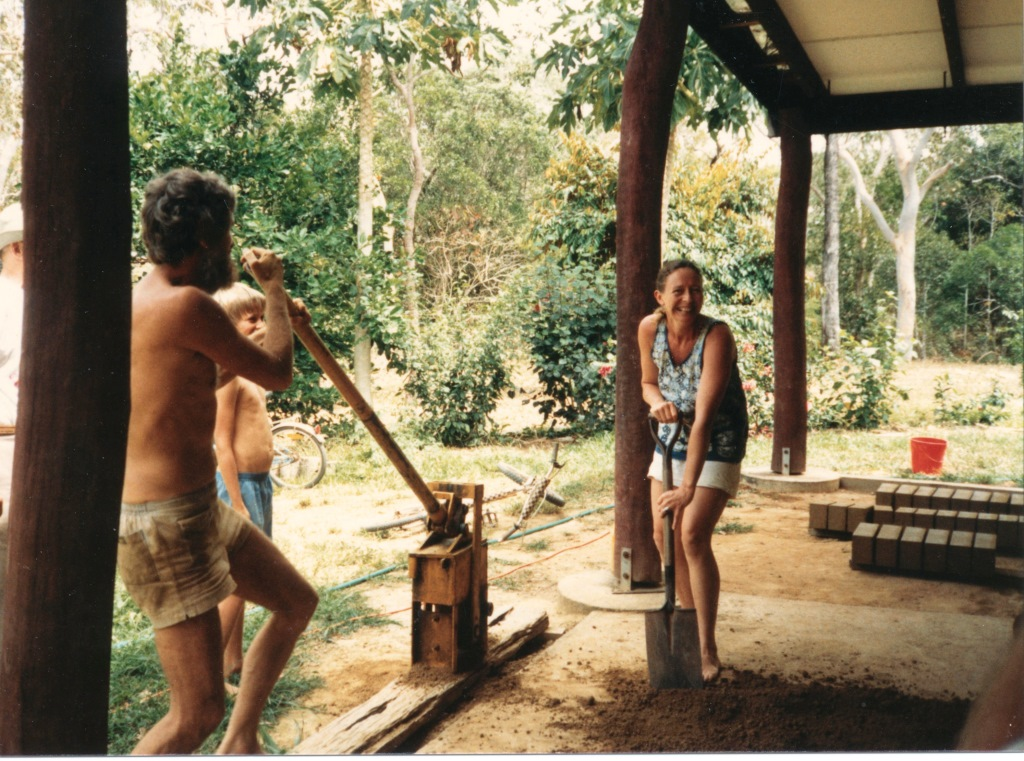
Making mudbricks near Cooktown, Australia

Mudbricks or Adobe bricks are preformed modular masonry units of sun-dried mud that were invented at different times in different parts of the world as civilization developed. Construction with bricks avoids the delays while each course of puddled mud dries. Wall murals show that adobe production techniques were highly advanced in Egypt by 2500 BC. Adobe construction is common throughout much of Africa today. Adobe bricks are traditionally made from sand and clay mixed with water to a plastic consistency, with straw or grass as a binder. (Note: The straw and grass in adobe does not make the brick any stronger in the long term, but helps ensure that the bricks shrink uniformly as they dry.) The mud is prepared, placed in wooden forms, tamped and leveled, and then turned out of the mold to dry for several days. The bricks are then stood on end to air-cure for a month or more.

In the southwest United States and Mexico adobe buildings had massive walls and were rarely more than two stories high. Adobe mission churches were never more than about 35 feet (11 m). Since adobe surfaces are fragile, coatings are used to protect them. These coatings, periodically renewed, have included mud plaster, lime plaster, whitewash (Note: Whitewash, made of ground gypsum mixed with water and clay, has been used to protect earth walls since ancient times.) or stucco. Adobe walls were historically made by laying the bricks with mud mortar, which swells and shrinks at the same rate as the bricks when wetted or dried, heated or cooled. Modern adobe may be stabilized with cement and bonded with cement mortars, but cement mortars will cause unstabilized adobe bricks to deteriorate due to the different rates of thermal expansion and contraction.

=== Compressed earth block ===
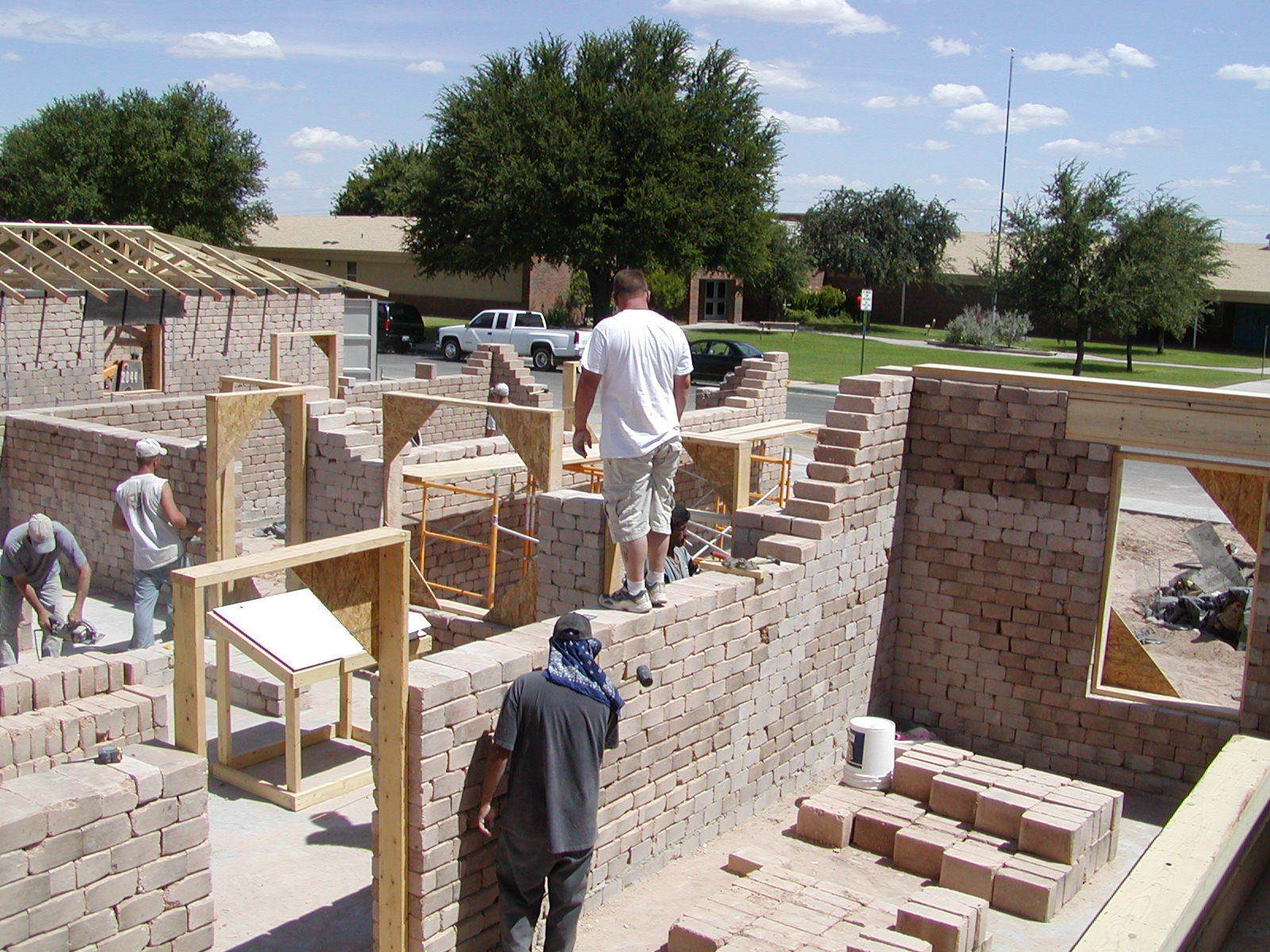
Compressed earth block housing being built in Midland, Texas in 2006

Compressed earth blocks (CEB) were traditionally made by using a stick to ram soil into a wooden mold. Today they are usually made from subsoil compressed in a hand-operated or powered machine. In the developing world, manual machines can be a cost-effective solution for making uniform building blocks, while the more complex and expensive motorized machines are less likely to be appropriate. Although labor-intensive, CEB construction avoids the cost of buying and transporting materials. Block-making machines may form blocks that have interlocking shapes to reduce the requirement for mortar. The block may have holes or grooves so rods such as bamboo can be inserted to improve earthquake resistance.

Suitable earth must be used, with enough clay to hold the block together and resist erosion, but not too much expansive clay. When the block has been made from stabilized earth, which contains cement, the concrete must be given perhaps three weeks to cure. During this time the blocks should be stacked and kept from drying out by sprinkling water over them. This may be a problem in hot, dry climates where water is scarce. Closely stacking the blocks and covering them with a polythene sheet may help reduce water loss.

=== Earthbags ===
Earthbag construction is a natural building technique that has evolved from historic military construction techniques for bunkers. Local subsoil of almost any composition can be used, although an adobe mix would be preferable. The soil is moistened so it will compact into a stable structure when packed into woven polypropylene or burlap sacks or tubes. Plastic mesh is sometimes used. Polypropylene (pp) sacks are most common, since they are durable when covered, cheap, and widely available. The bags are laid in courses, with barbed wire between each course to prevent slipping. Each course is tamped after it is laid. The structure in pp bags is similar to adobe but more flexible. With mesh tubing the structure is like rammed earth. Earthbags may be used to make dome-shaped or vertical wall buildings. With soil stabilization they may also be used for retaining walls.

=== Fired clay brick ===
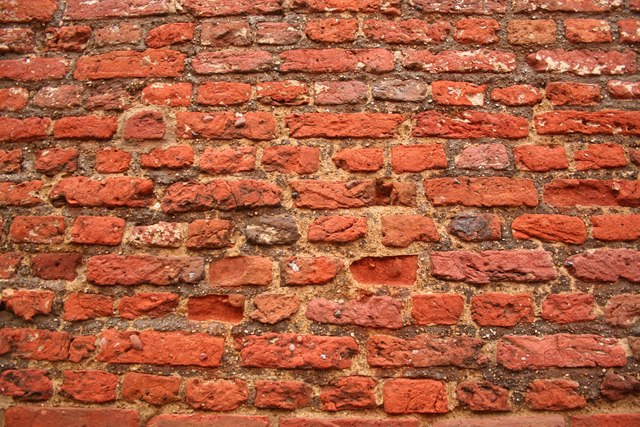
English bond bricks from 1454 at the Old College in Tattershall, Lincolnshire, England

The technique of firing clay bricks in a kiln dates to about 3500 BC. Fired bricks were being used to build durable masonry across Europe, Asia and North Africa by 1200 BC and still remain an important building material. Modern fired clay bricks are formed from clays or shales, shaped and then fired in a kiln for 8–12 hours at a temperature of 900–1150 °C. (Note: Yellow Dutch bricks were made from clay or mud dredged from the IJssel and other rivers, which was molded and burned in peat-fired kilns for three or four weeks. The bricks were then given about three weeks to cool before being removed. Modern processes use higher temperatures and much shorter firing times.) The result is a ceramic that is mainly composed of silica and alumina, with other ingredients such as quartz sand. The porosity of the brick depends on the materials and on the firing temperature and duration. The bricks may vary in color depending on the amount of iron and calcium carbonate in the materials used, and the amount of oxygen in the kiln. Bricks may decay due to crystallization of salts on the brick or in its pores, from frost action and from acidic gases.

Bricks are laid in courses bonded with mortar, a combination of Portland cement, lime and sand. A wall that is one brick thick will include stretcher bricks with their long, narrow side exposed and header bricks crossing from side to side. There are various brickwork "bonds", or patterns of stretchers and headers, including the English, Dutch and Flemish bonds.

== Examples ==
=== Earth sheltering ===
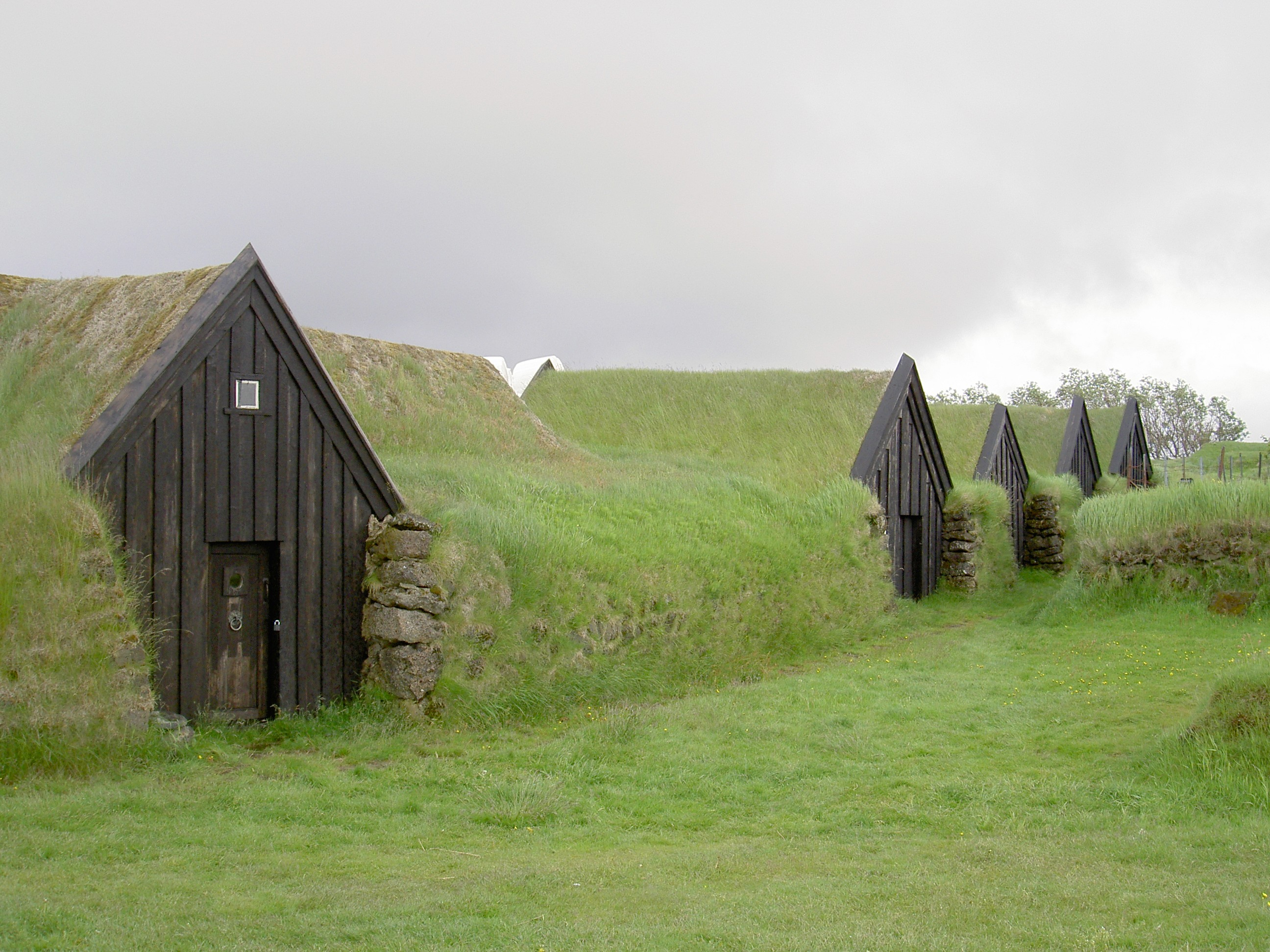
Turf houses in Keldur, Iceland, an example of Earth sheltering

Earth sheltering has been used for thousands of years to make energy-efficient dwellings. There are various configurations. At one extreme, an earth sheltered dwelling is completely underground, with perhaps an open courtyard to provide air and light. An earth house may be set into a slope, with windows or door openings in one or more of its sides, or the building may be on ground level, but with earth mounded against the walls, and perhaps with an earth roof.

Pit houses made by Hohokam farmers between 100 and 900 AD, in what is now the southwest of the US, were bermed structures, partially embedded in south-facing slopes. Their successful design was used for hundreds of years. At Matmata, Tunisia, most of the ancient homes were built 12 metres (39 ft) below ground level, and surrounded courtyards about 12 metres (39 ft) square. (Note: The opening scenes of Star Wars were shot in the Hotel Sidi Driss in Matmata, Tunisia, an earth sheltered dwelling around a deeply sunken courtyard.) The homes were reached through tunnels. Other examples of subterranean, semi-subterranean or cliff-based dwellings in both hot and cold climates are found in Turkey, northern China and the Himalayas, and the southwest USA. A number of Buddhist monasteries built from earth and other materials into cliff sides or caves in Himalayan areas such as Tibet, Bhutan, Nepal and northern India are often perilously placed. Starting in the 1970s, interest in the technique has revived in developed countries. By setting an earth house into the ground, the house will be cooler in the warm season and warmer in the cool season.

=== Native American earth lodge ===
An earth lodge is a circular building made by some of the Native Americans of North America. They have wood post and beam construction and are dome-shaped. A typical structure would have four or more central posts planted in the ground and connected at the top by cross beams. The smoke hole would be left open in the center. Around the central structure there was a larger ring of shorter posts, also connected by cross beams. Rafters radiated from the central cross beams to the outside cross beams, and then split planks or beams formed the slanting or vertical side walls. The structure was covered by sticks and brush or grass, covered in turn by a heavy layer of earth or sod. Some groups plastered the whole structure with mud, which dried to form a shell.

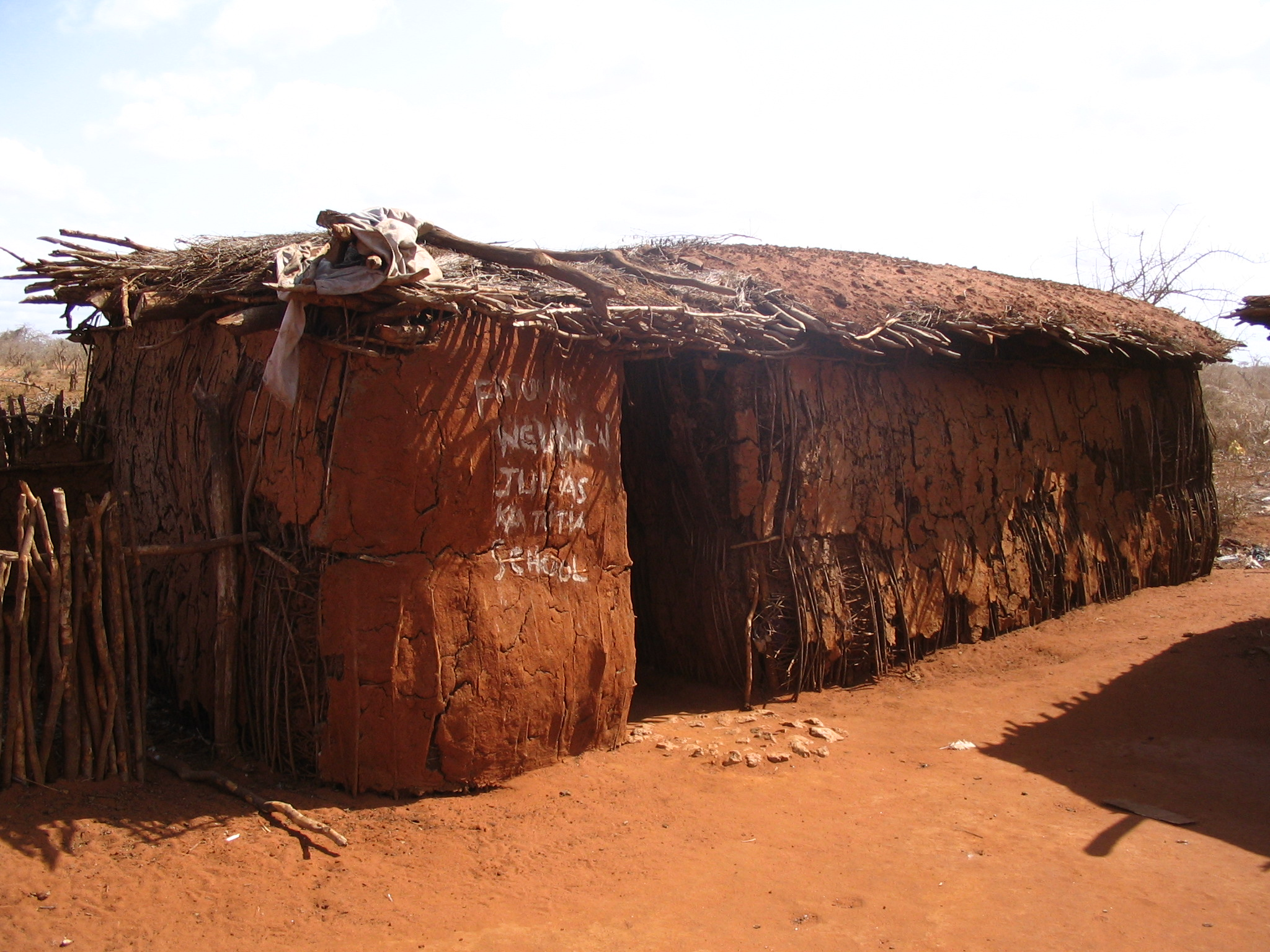
School in a Maasai village on the A109 road, Kenya

=== Wattle and daub ===
Wattle and daub is an old building technique in which vines or smaller sticks are interwoven between upright poles, and then mud mixed with straw and grass is plastered over the wall. The technique is found around the world, from the Nile Delta to Japan, where bamboo was used to make the wattle. In Cahokia, now in Illinois, USA, wattle and daub houses were built with the floor lowered by 1 to 3 feet (0.30 to 0.91 m) below the ground. A variant of the technique is called bajareque in Colombia. In prehistoric Britain simple circular wattle and daub shelters were built wherever adequate clay was available. Wattle and daub is still found as the panels in timber-framed buildings. Generally the walls are not structural, and in interior use the technique in the developed world was replaced by lath and plaster, and then by gypsum wallboard.

=== Prairie sod house ===
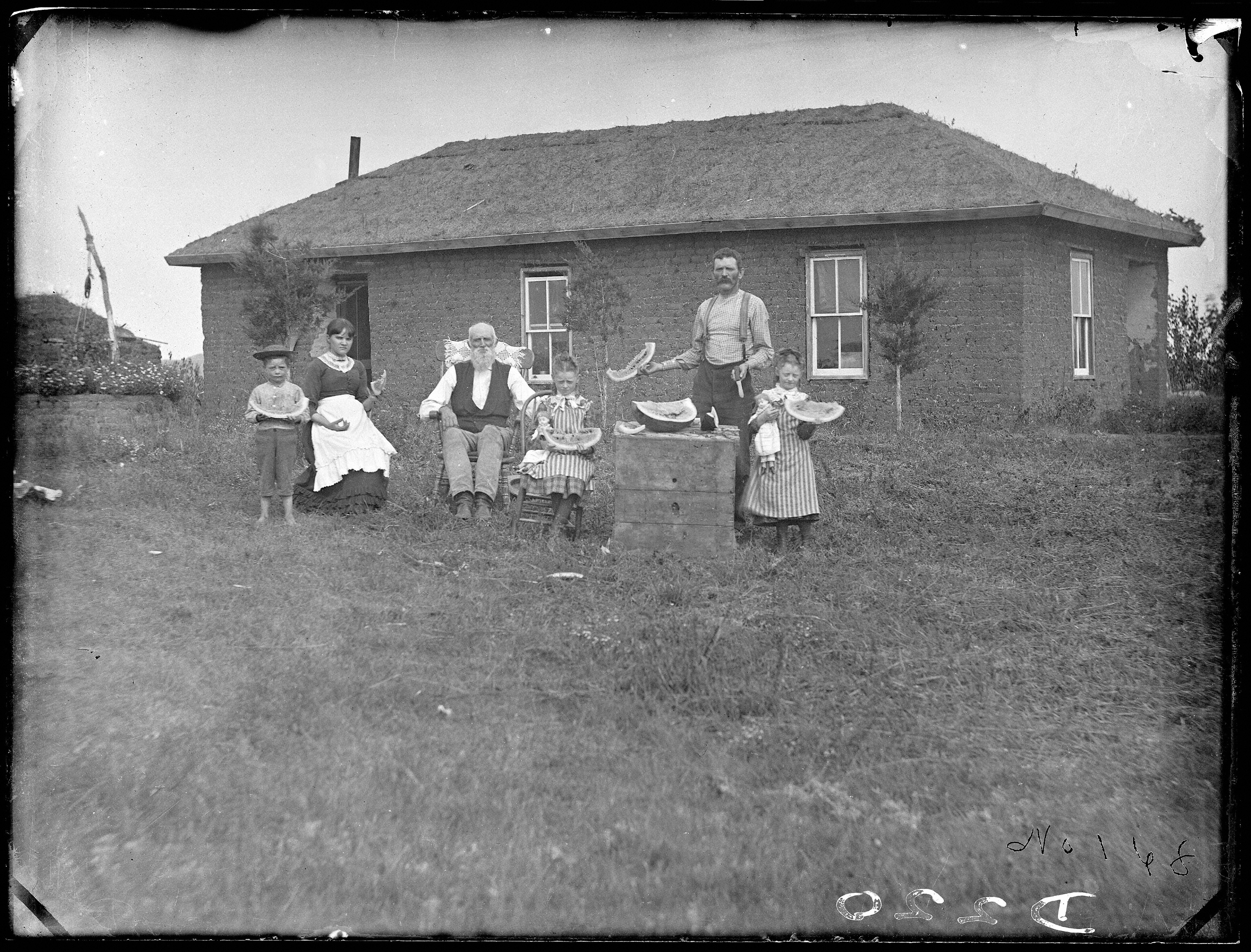
Omer Madison Kem, (later, Representative to the United States Congress) in front of his sod house in Nebraska (1886)

European pioneer farmers in the prairies of North America, where there is no wood for construction, often made their first home in a dug-out cave in the side of a hill or ravine, with a covering over the entrance. When they had time, they would build a sod house. The farmer would use a plow to cut the sod into bricks 1 by 2 feet (0.30 by 0.61 m), which were then piled up to form the walls. The sod strips were piled grass-side down, staggered in the same way as brickwork, in three side-by-side rows, resulting in a wall over 3 feet (0.91 m) thick. The sod wall was built around door and window frames, and the corners of the wall were secured by rods driven vertically through them. The roof was made with poles or brush, covered with prairie grass, and then sealed with a layer of sod. Sod houses were strong and often lasted many years, but they were damp and dirty unless the interior walls were plastered. The roofs tended to leak, and sometimes collapsed in a rainstorm.

=== Mud brick buildings ===
There are innumerable examples of mud brick or adobe building around the world. The walled city of Shibam in Yemen, designated a World Heritage Site in 1982, is known for its ten-story unreinforced mud-brick buildings. The Djinguereber Mosque of Timbuktu, Mali, was first built at the start of the 14th century AD (8th century AH) from round mud bricks and a stone-mud mixture, and was rebuilt several times afterwards, steadily growing in size. Further south in Mali, the Great Mosque of Djenné, a dramatic example of Sahel mudbrick architecture. was built in 1907, based on the design of an earlier Great Mosque first built on the site in 1280. Mudbrick requires maintenance, and the fundamentalist ruler Seku Amadu had let the previous mosque collapse.

The Casa Grande Ruins, now a national monument in Arizona protected by a modern roof, is a massive four-story adobe structure built by Hohokam people between 1200 and 1450 AD. The first European to record the great house was a Jesuit priest, Father Eusebio Kino, who visited the site in 1694. At that time it had long been abandoned. By the time a temporary roof was installed in 1903 the adobe building had been standing empty and unmaintained for hundreds of years.

Huaca de la Luna in what is now northern Peru is a large adobe temple built by the Moche people. The building went through a series of construction phases, growing eventually to a height of about 32 metres (105 ft), with three main platforms, four plazas and many smaller rooms and enclosures. The walls were covered by striking multi-colored murals and friezes; those visible today date from about 400–610 AD.

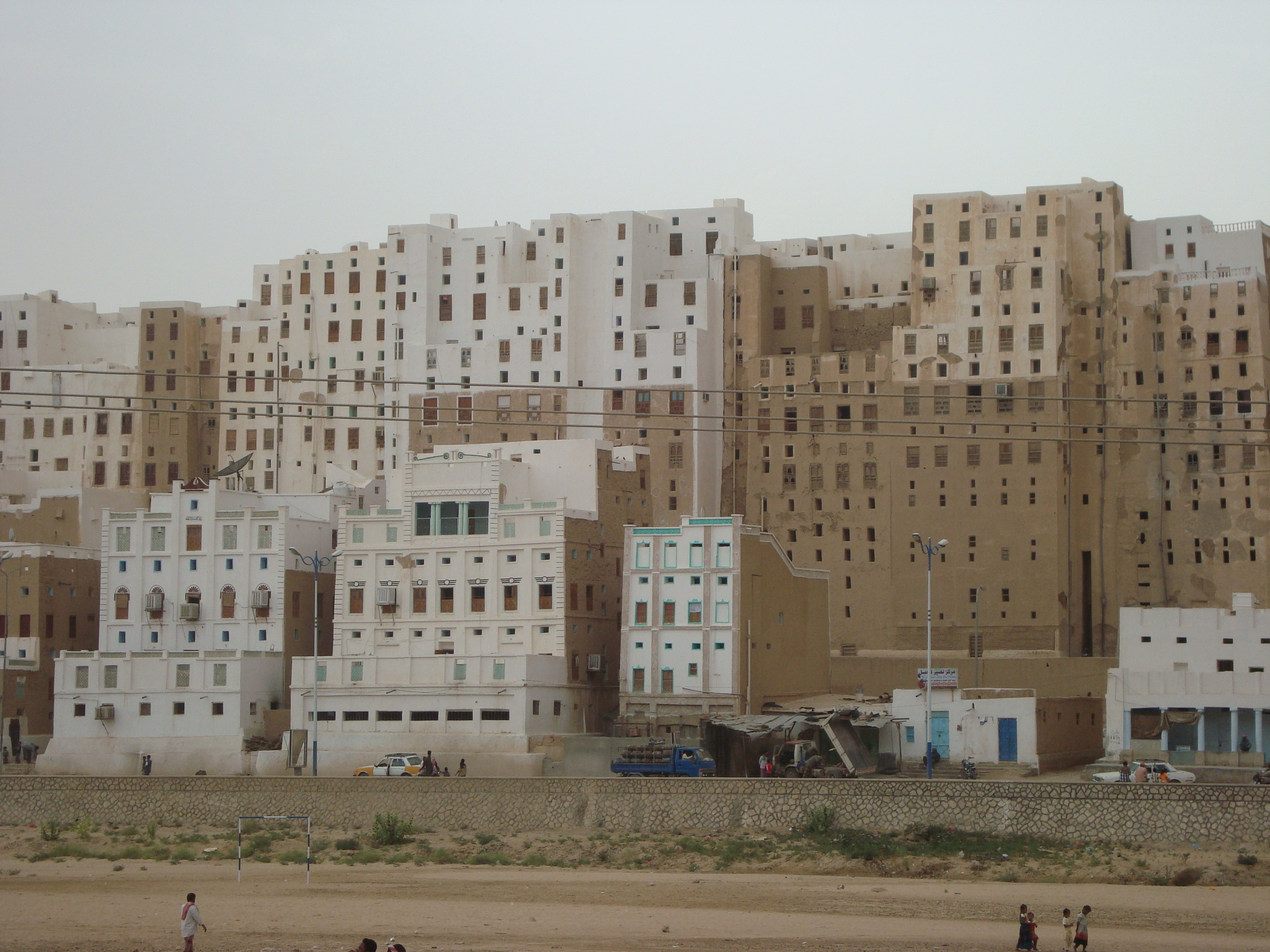
High-rise mud brick buildings in Shibam

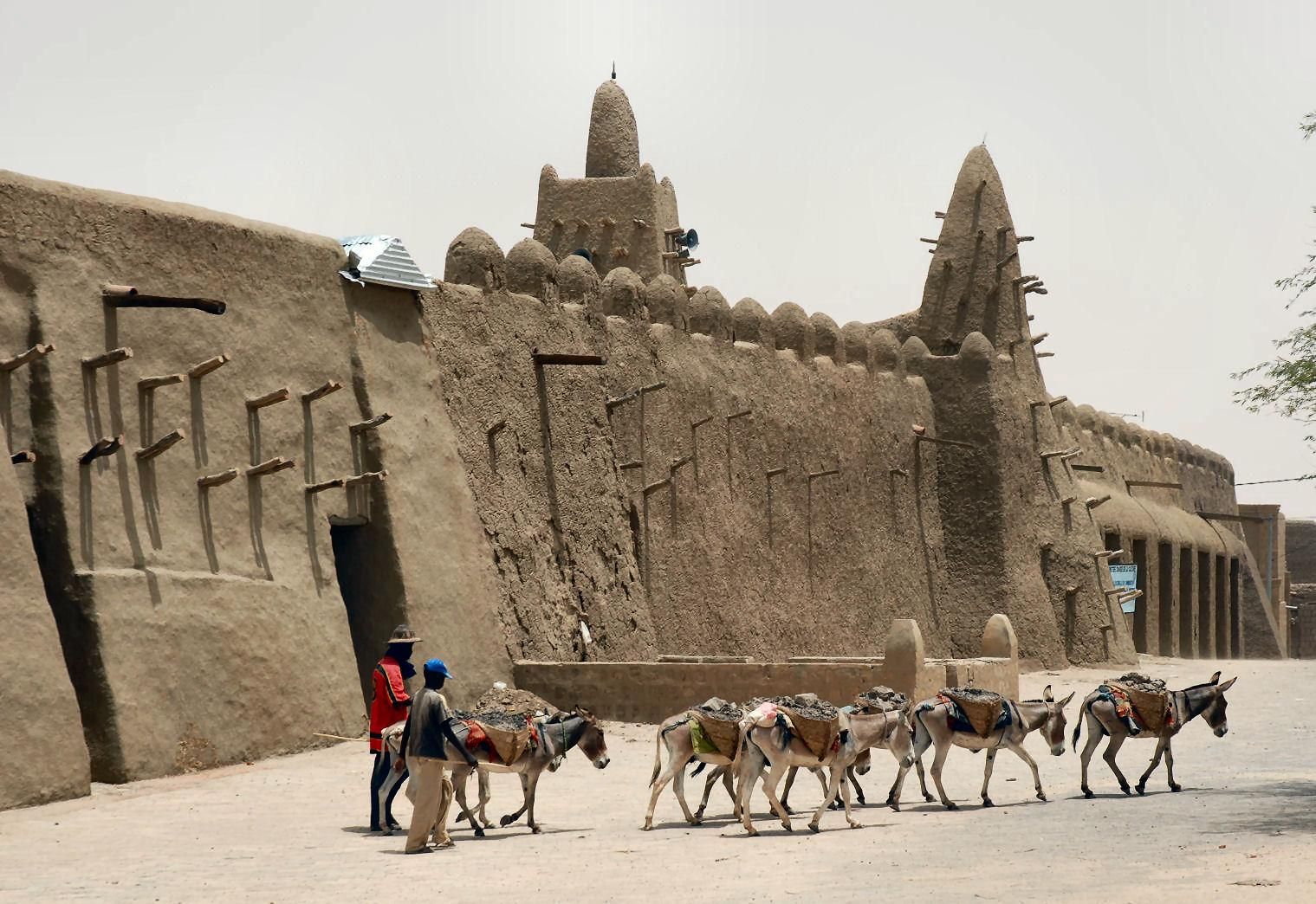
Mud wall and mosque in Timbuktu

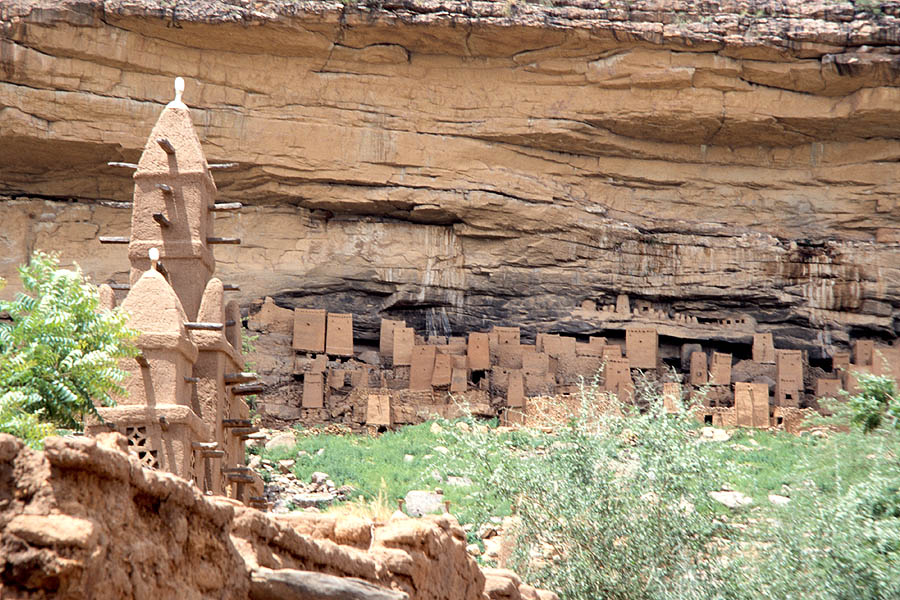
Old mud dwellings and modern mud mosque in Mali

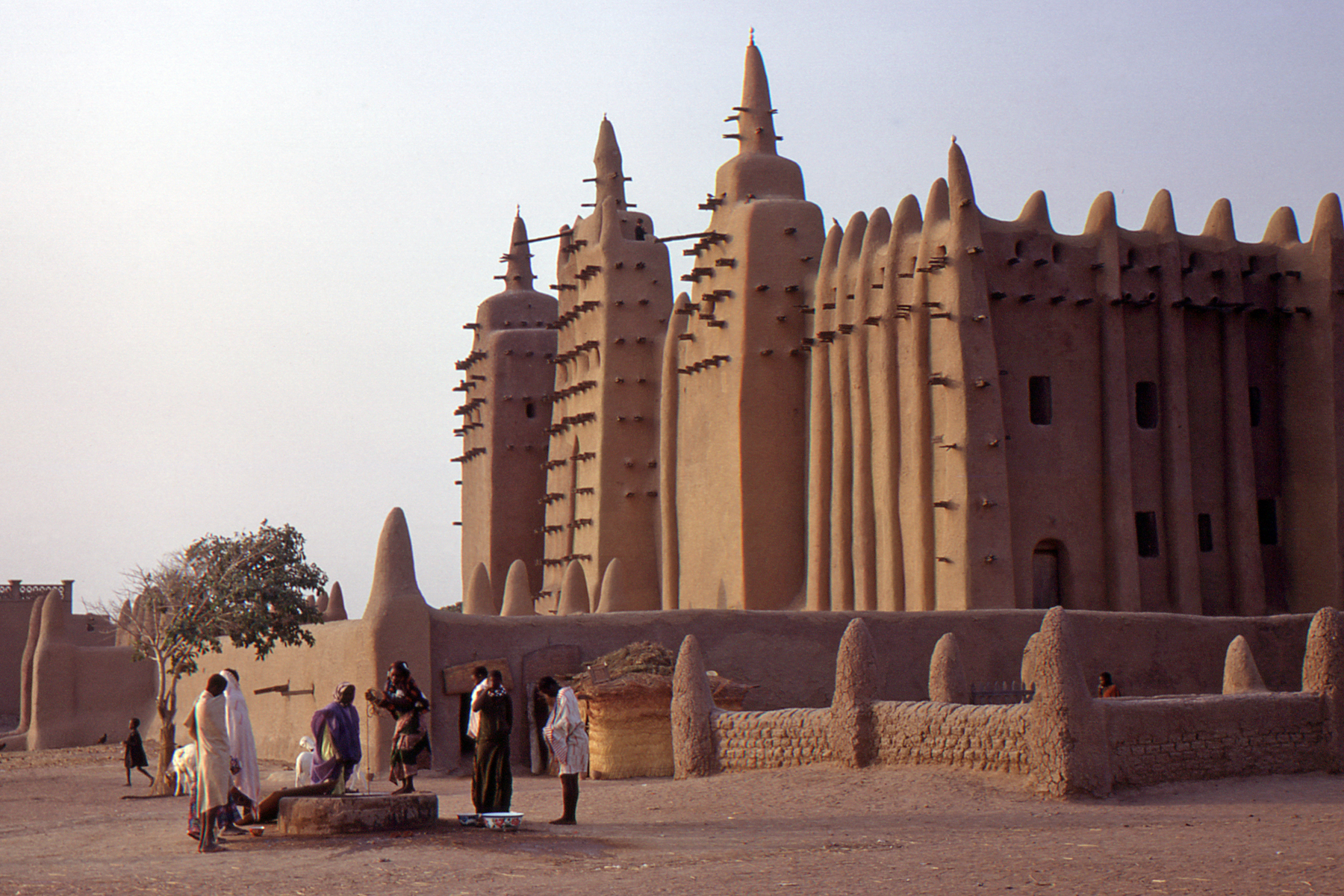
Great Mosque of Djenné, Mali, in 1972

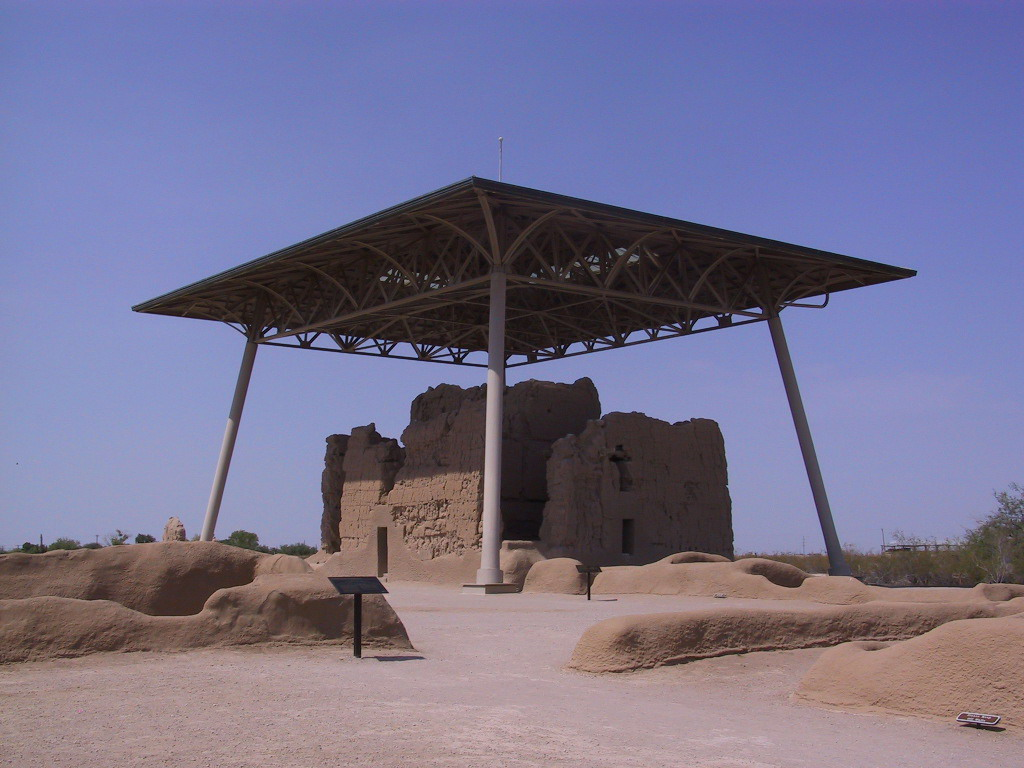
Casa Grande Ruins National Monument in Arizona

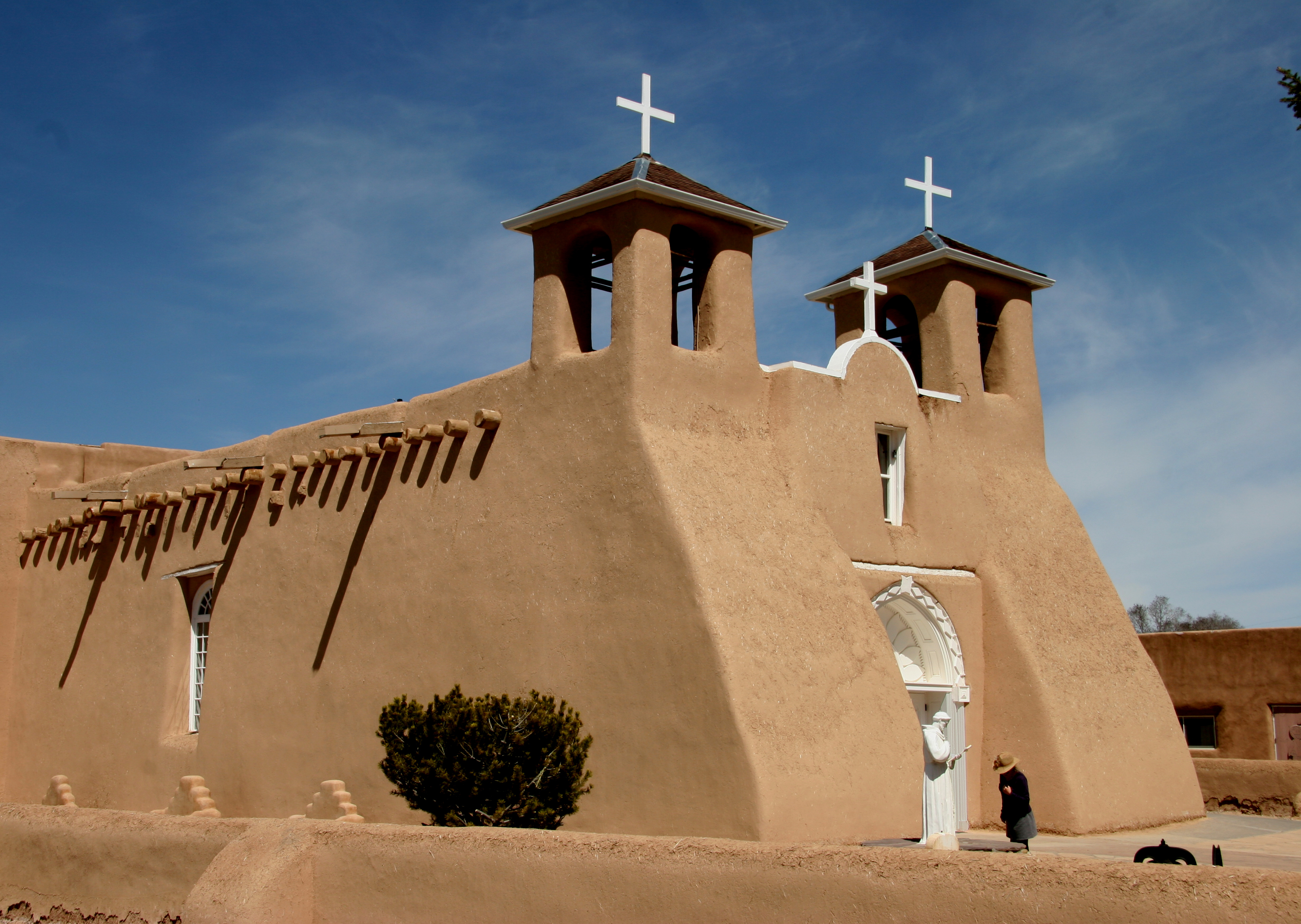
San Francisco de Asis Mission Church at Ranchos de Taos, New Mexico

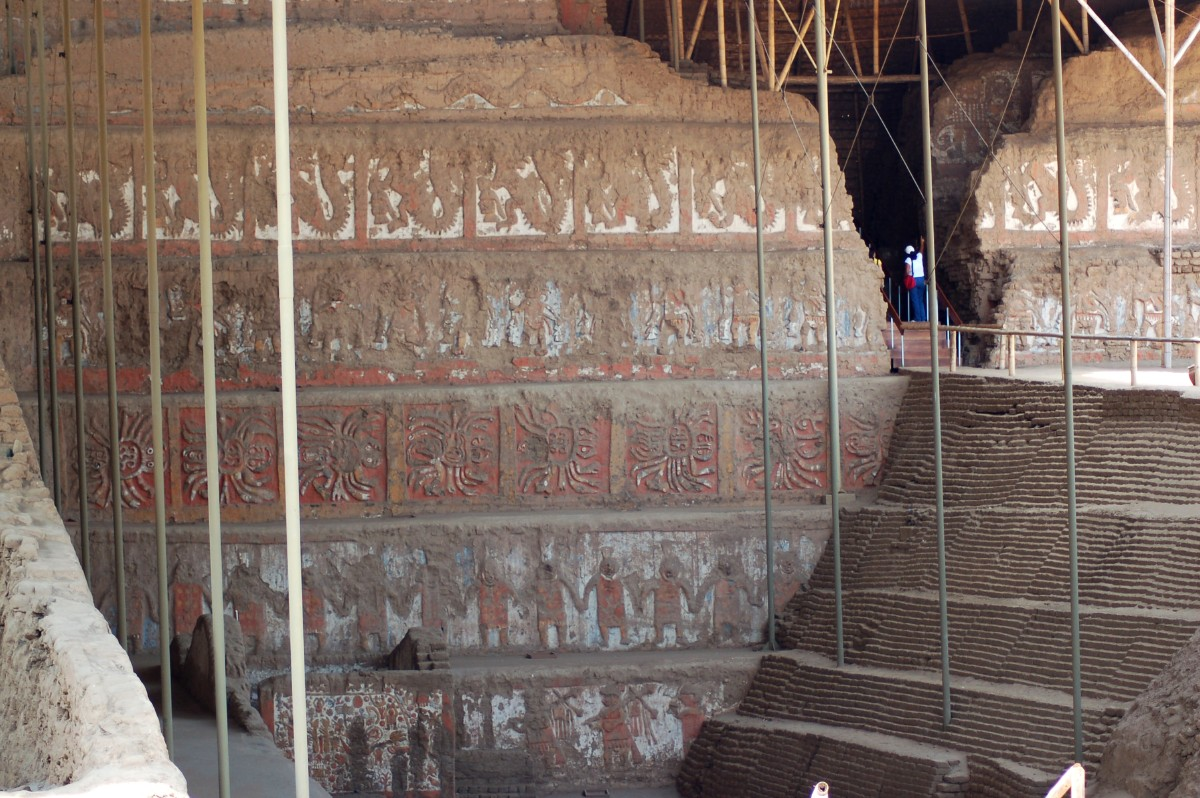
Interior of Huaca de la Luna, Trujillo, Peru

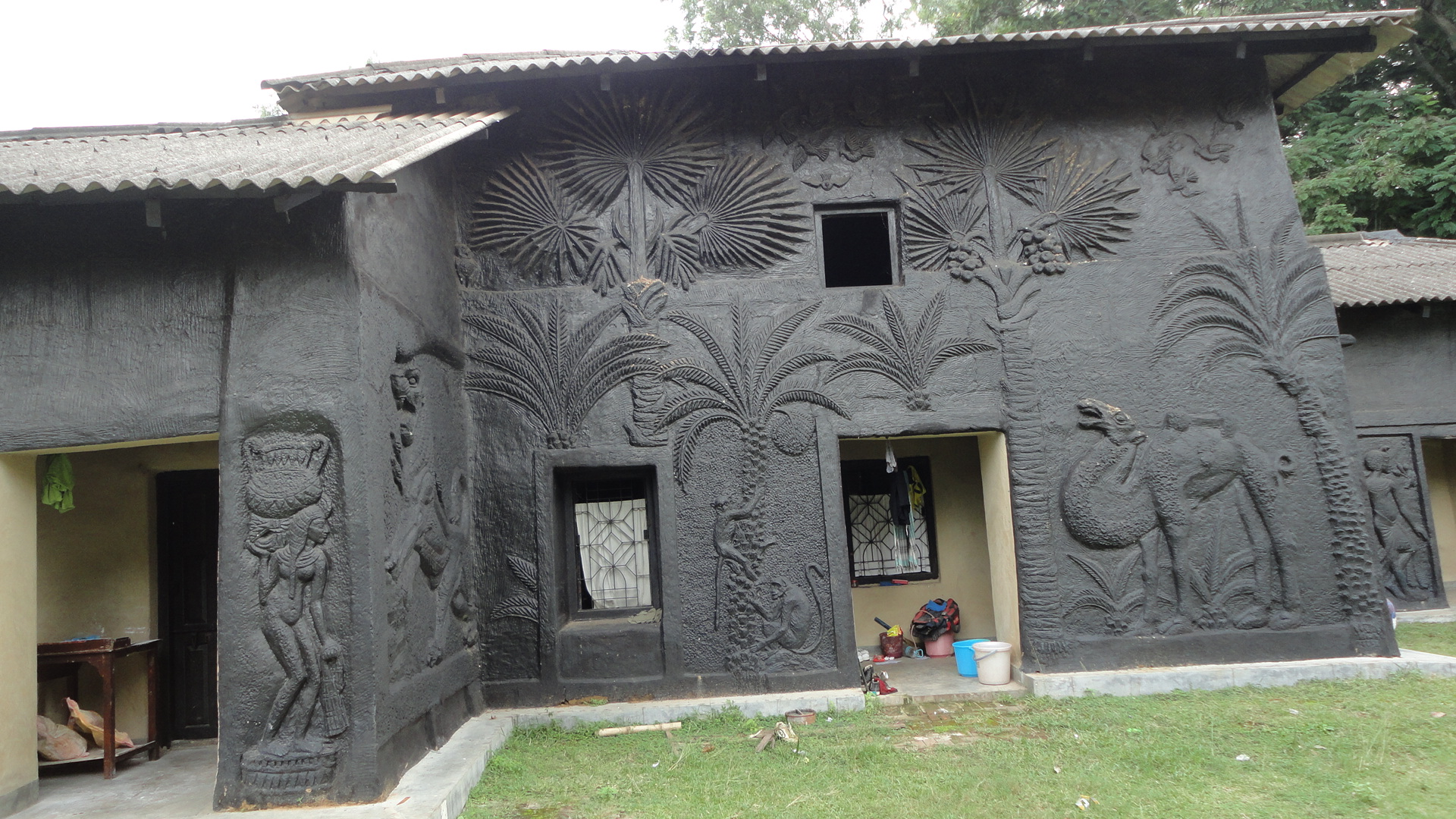
Art on an adobe building at Shantiniketan University, Bolpur, West Bengal

=== Toulous ===
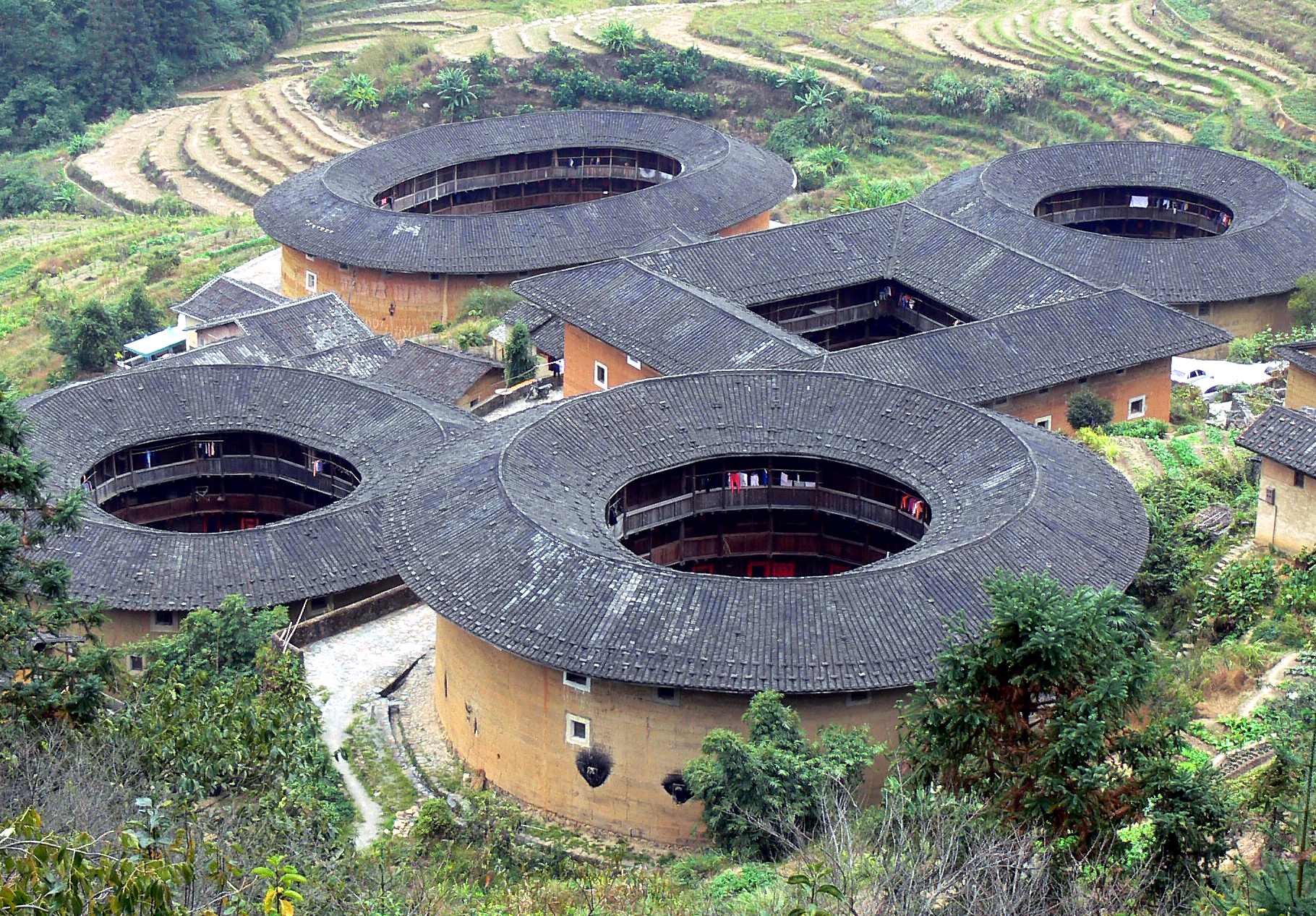
Tianluokeng Tulou cluster in Fujian province, China

A Fujian Tulou is a type of rural dwelling of the Hakka people in the mountainous areas in southeastern Fujian, China. They were mostly built between the 13th and the 20th centuries. A tulou is a large, enclosed and fortified earth building, rectangular or circular, with very thick load-bearing rammed earth walls between three and five stories high. A toulou might house up to 80 families. Smaller interior buildings are often enclosed by these huge peripheral walls which can contain halls, storehouses, wells and living areas. The structure resembles a small fortified city. The walls are formed by compacting earth mixed with stone, bamboo, wood and other readily available materials, and are to 6 feet (1.8 m) thick. The result is a well-lit, well-ventilated, windproof and earthquake-proof building that is warm in winter and cool in summer.

=== Mounds and pyramids ===
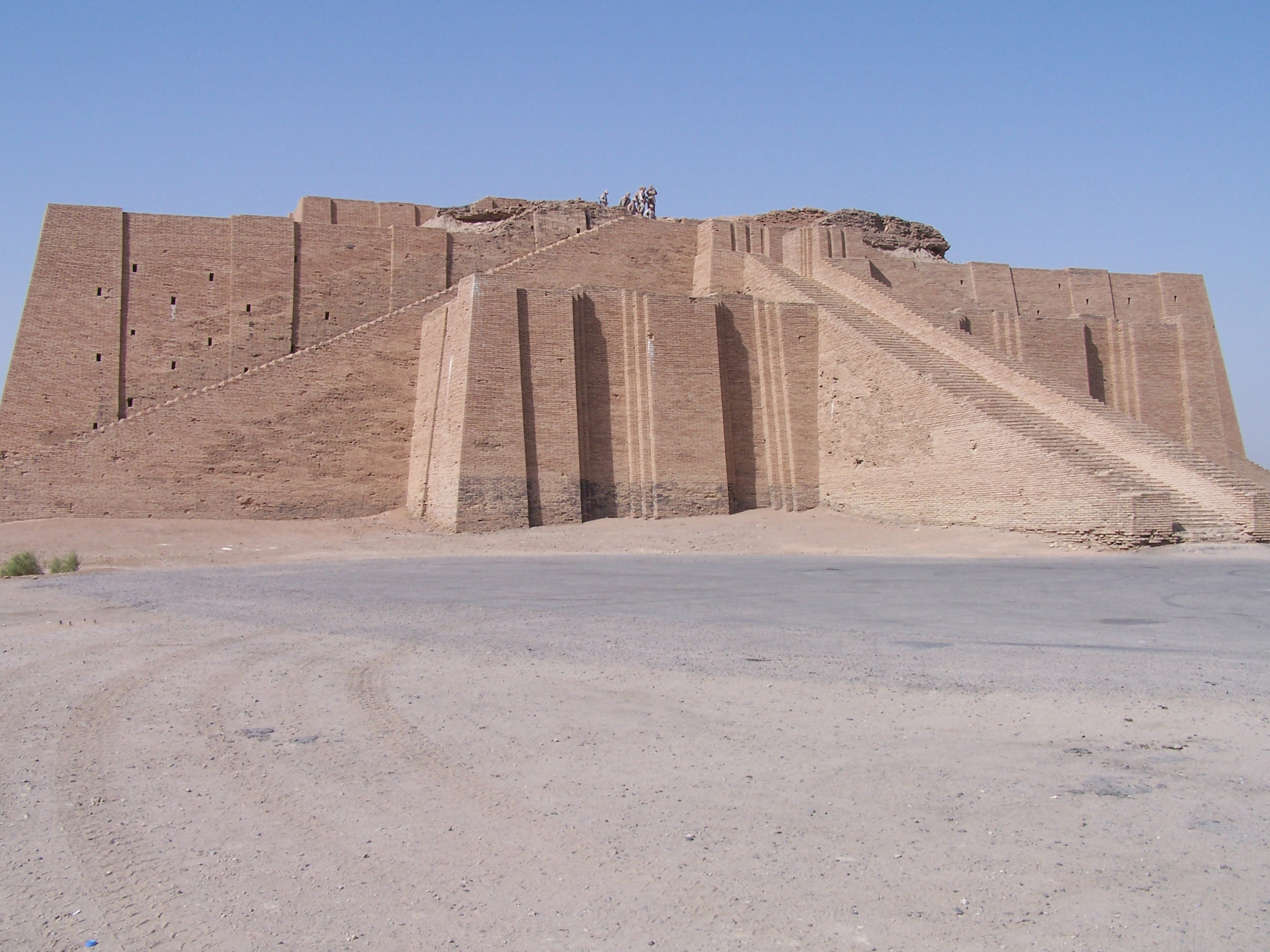
Ziggurat at Ali Air Base in Iraq

Ziggurats were elevated temples constructed by the Sumerians between the end of the 4th millennium BC and the 2nd millennium BC, rising in a series of terraces to a temple up to 200 feet (61 m) above ground level. The Ziggurat of Ur contained about three million bricks, none more than 15 inches (380 mm) in length, so construction would have been a huge project. The largest ziggurat was in Babylon, and is thought by some to be the Tower of Babel mentioned in the Bible. It was destroyed by Alexander the Great and only the foundations remain, but originally it stood 300 feet (91 m) high on a base about 660 feet (200 m) square. Sun-dried bricks were used for the interior and kiln-fired bricks for the facing. The bricks were held together by clay or bitumen.

Many pre-Columbian Native American societies of ancient North America built large pyramidal earth structures known as platform mounds. Among the largest and best-known of these structures is Monks Mound at the site of Cahokia in what became Illinois, completed around 1100 AD, which has a base larger than that of the Great Pyramid at Giza. Many of the mounds underwent multiple episodes of mound construction at periodic intervals, some becoming quite large. They are believed to have played a central role in the mound-building peoples' religious life and documented uses include semi-public chief's house platforms, public temple platforms, mortuary platforms, charnel house platforms, earth lodge/town house platforms, residence platforms, square ground and rotunda platforms, and dance platforms.

The 207 feet (63 m) Pyramid of the Sun in Teotihuacan, Mexico, was started in 100 AD. The stone-faced structure contains two million tons of rammed earth.

=== Earthworks ===
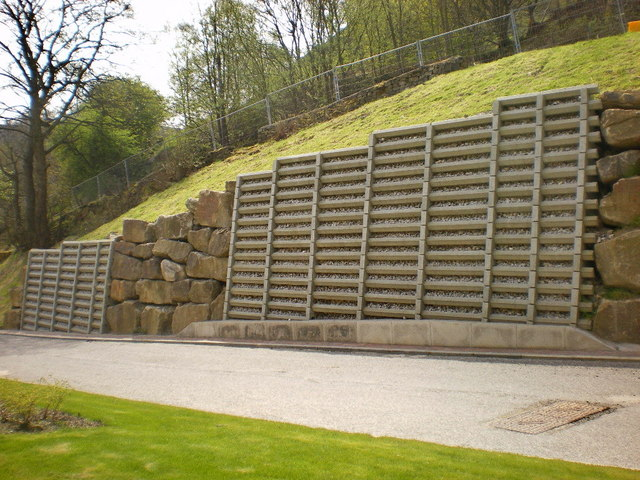
Retaining wall near Todmorden, West Yorkshire, England

Earthworks are engineering works created through moving or processing quantities of soil or unformed rock. The material may be moved to another location and formed into a desired shape for a purpose. Levees, embankments and dams are types of earthwork. A levee, floodbank or stopbank is an elongated natural ridge or artificially constructed dirt fill wall that regulates water levels. It is usually earthen and often runs parallel to the course of a river in its floodplain or along low-lying coastlines.

Mechanically stabilized earth (MSE) retaining walls may be used for embankments. MSE walls combine a concrete leveling pad, wall facing panels, coping, soil reinforcement and select backfill. A variety of designs of wall facing panels may be used. After the leveling pad has been laid and the first row of panels has been placed and braced, the first layer of earth backfill is brought in behind the wall and compacted. The first set of reinforcements is then laid over the earth. The reinforcements, which may be tensioned polymer or galvanized metal strips or grids, are attached to the facing panels. This process is repeated with successive layers of panels, earth and reinforcements. The panels are thus tied into the earth embankment to make a stable structure with balanced stresses.

Although construction using the basic principles of MSE has a long history, MSE was developed in its current form in the 1960s. The reinforcing elements used can vary but include steel and geosynthetics. The term MSE is usually used in the US to distinguish it from "Reinforced Earth", a trade name of the Reinforced Earth Company, but elsewhere Reinforced Soil is the generally accepted term. MSE construction is relatively fast and inexpensive, and although labor-intensive, it does not demand high levels of skill. It is therefore suitable for developing as well as developed countries.

=== Forts and trenches ===
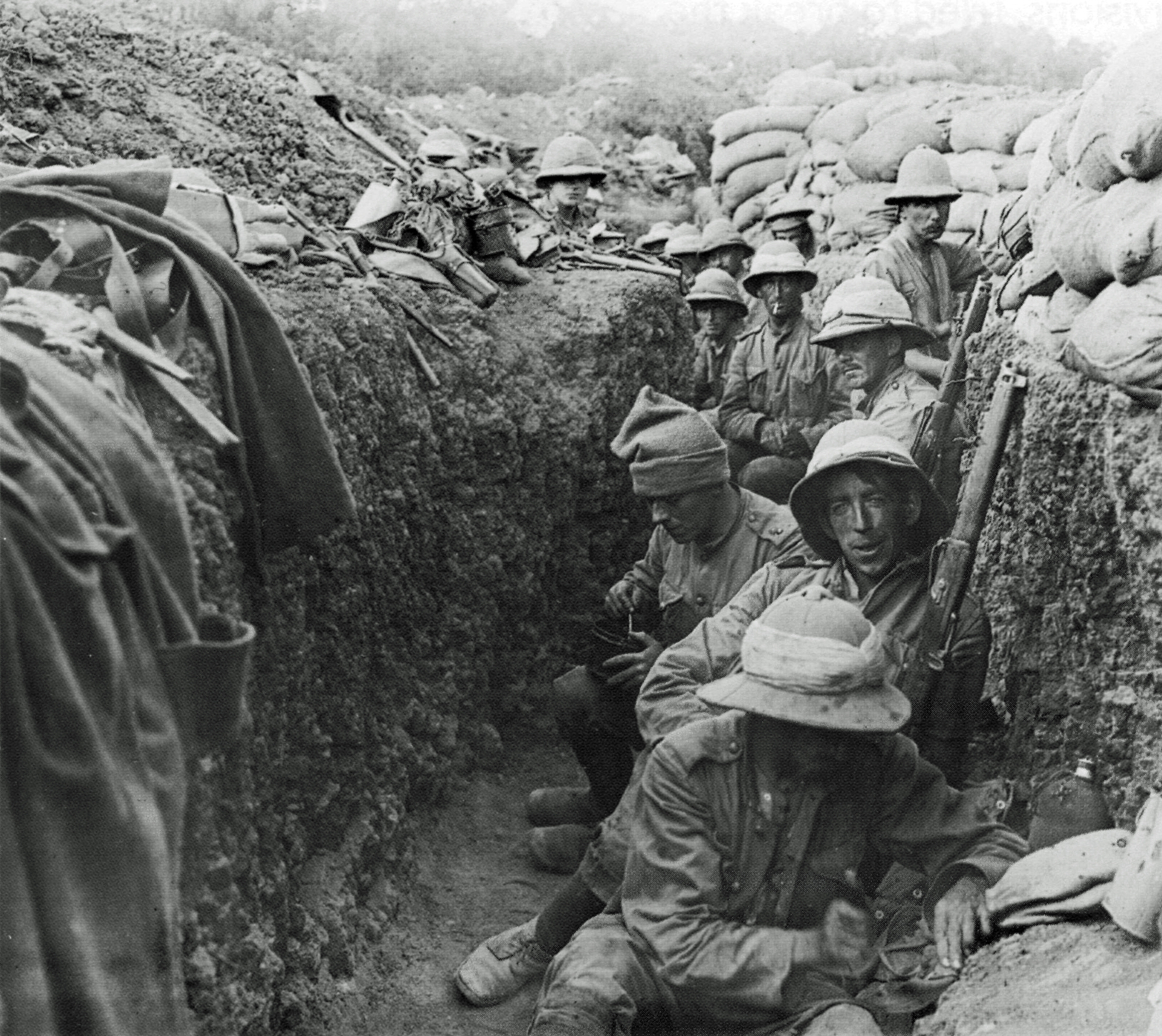
Soldiers in a trench on Gallipoli during World War I

Earth has been used to construct fortifications for thousands of years, including strongholds and walls, often protected by ditches. Aerial photography in Europe has revealed traces of earth fortifications from the Roman era, and later medieval times. Offa's Dyke is a huge earthwork that stretches along the disputed border between England and Wales. Little is known about the period or the builder, King Offa of Mercia, who died in 796 AD. An early timber and earth fortification might later be succeeded by a brick or stone structure on the same site.

Trenches were used by besieging forces to approach a fortification while protected from missiles. Sappers would build "saps", or trenches, that zig-zagged towards the fortress being attacked. They piled the excavated dirt to make a protective wall or gabion. The combined trench depth and gabion height might be 8 to 10 feet (2.4 to 3.0 m). Sometimes the sap was a tunnel, dug several feet below the surface. Sappers were highly skilled and highly paid due to the extreme danger of their work.

In the American Civil War (1861−1865) trenches were used for defensive positions throughout the struggle, but played an increasingly important role in the campaigns of the last two years. Military earthworks perhaps culminated in the vast network of trenches built during World War I (1914−1918) that stretched from Switzerland to the North Sea by the end of 1914. The two lines of trenches faced each other, manned by soldiers living in appalling conditions of cold, damp and filth. Conditions were worst in the Allied trenches. The Germans were more willing to accept the trenches as long-term positions, and used concrete blocks to build secure shelters deep underground, often with electrical lighting and heating.

=== Embankment dams ===
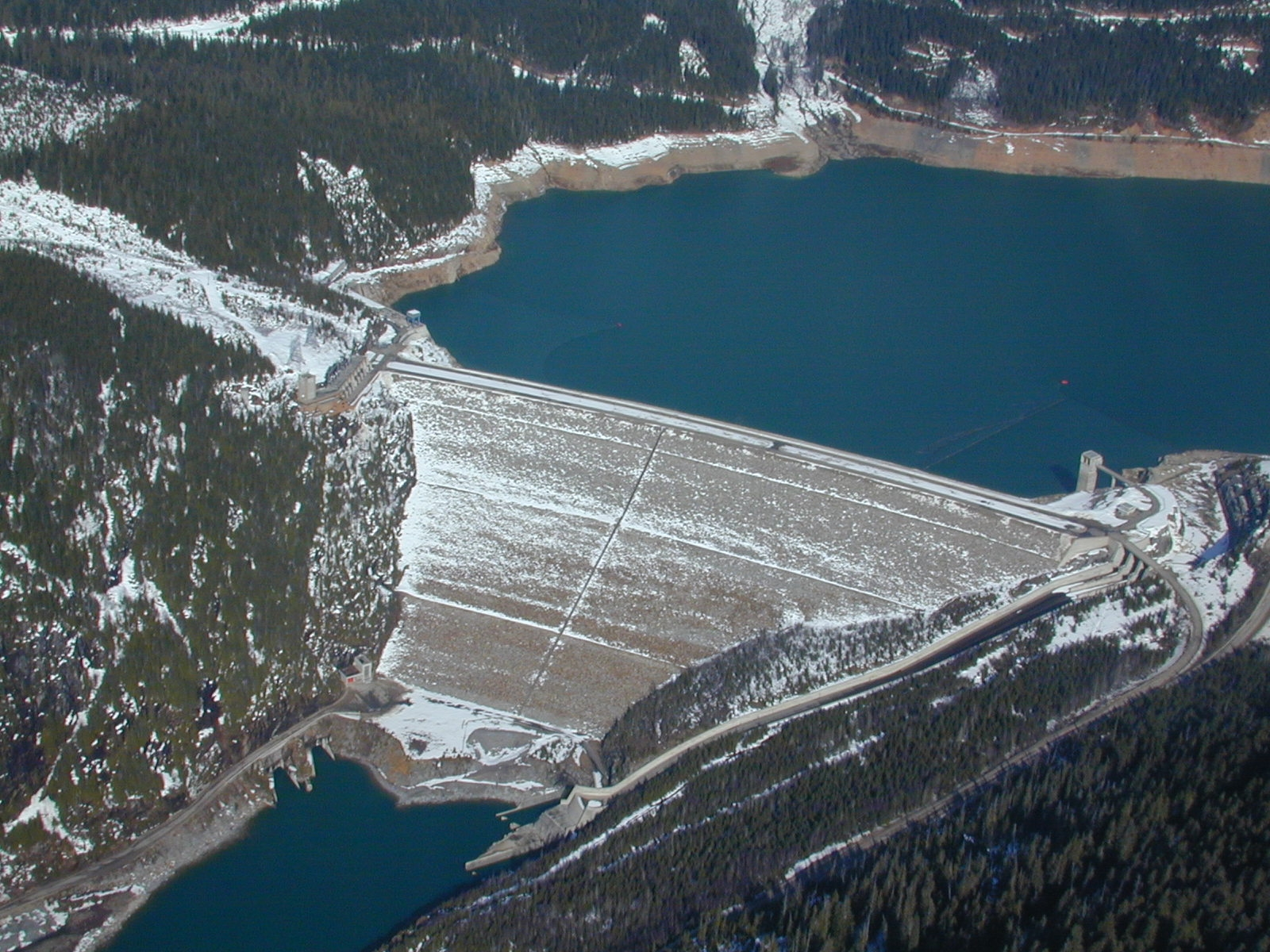
The Mica Dam in Canada

An embankment dam is a massive artificial water barrier. It is typically created by the emplacement and compaction of a complex semi-plastic mound of various compositions of soil, sand, clay and/or rock. It has a semi-permanent natural waterproof covering for its surface, and a dense, waterproof core. This makes such a dam impervious to surface or seepage erosion. The force of the impoundment creates a downward thrust upon the mass of the dam, greatly increasing the weight of the dam on its foundation. This added force effectively seals and makes waterproof the underlying foundation of the dam, at the interface between the dam and its stream bed. Such a dam is composed of fragmented independent material particles. The friction and interaction of particles binds the particles together into a stable mass rather than by the use of a cementing substance.

The Syncrude Mildred Lake Tailings Dyke in Alberta, Canada, is an embankment dam about 18 kilometres (11 mi) long and from 40 to 88 metres (131 to 289 ft) high. By volume of fill, as of 2001 it was believed to be the largest earth structure in the world.

== Structural issues ==
=== Designing for Earthquakes ===
Regions with low seismic risk are safe for most earth buildings, but historic construction techniques often cannot resist even medium earthquake levels effectively because of earthen buildings' three highly undesirable qualities as a seismic building material: being relatively 'weak, heavy and brittle'. However, earthen buildings can be built to resist seismic loads.

Key factors to improved seismic performance are soil strength, construction quality, robust layout and seismic reinforcement.

Stronger soils make stronger walls. Adobe builders can test cured blocks for strength by dropping from a specific height or by breaking them with a lever. Builders using immediate techniques like earthbag, cob, or rammed earth may prefer approximate crushing tests on smaller samples that can be oven-dried and crushed under a small lever.

Builders must understand construction processes and be able to produce consistent quality for strong buildings.

Robust layout means buildings more square than elongated, and symmetrical not L-shaped, as well as no 'soft' first stories (stories with large windows, buildings on unbraced columns). New Zealand's earthen building guidelines check for enough bracing wall length in each of the two principal directions, based on wall thickness, story height, bracing wall spacing, and the roof, loft and second story weight above earthen walls.

=== Seismic-Resistant Construction Techniques ===
Building techniques that are more ductile than brittle, like the contained earth type of earthbag, or tire walls of earthships, may better avoid collapse than brittle unreinforced earth. Contained gravel base courses may add base isolation potential.

Wall containment can be added to techniques like adobe to resist loss of material that leads to collapse. Confined masonry is effective for adobe against quake forces of 0.3 g may be useful with earthen masonry.

Many types of reinforcement can increase wall strength, such as plastic or wire mesh and reinforcing rods of steel or fiberglass or bamboo. Earth resists compression well but is weak when twisted. Tensile reinforcement must span potential damage points and be well-anchored to increase out-of-plane stability. Bond beams at wall tops are vital and must be well attached to walls.

Builders should be aware that organic reinforcements embedded in walls may be destroyed before the building is retired. Attachment details of reinforcement are critical to resist higher forces. Best adobe shear strength came from horizontal reinforcement attached directly to vertical rebar spanning from footing to bond beam.

Interlaced wood in earthen walls reduces quake damage if wood is not damaged by dry rot or insects. Timberlacing includes finely webbed Dhajji, and other types.

== See also ==
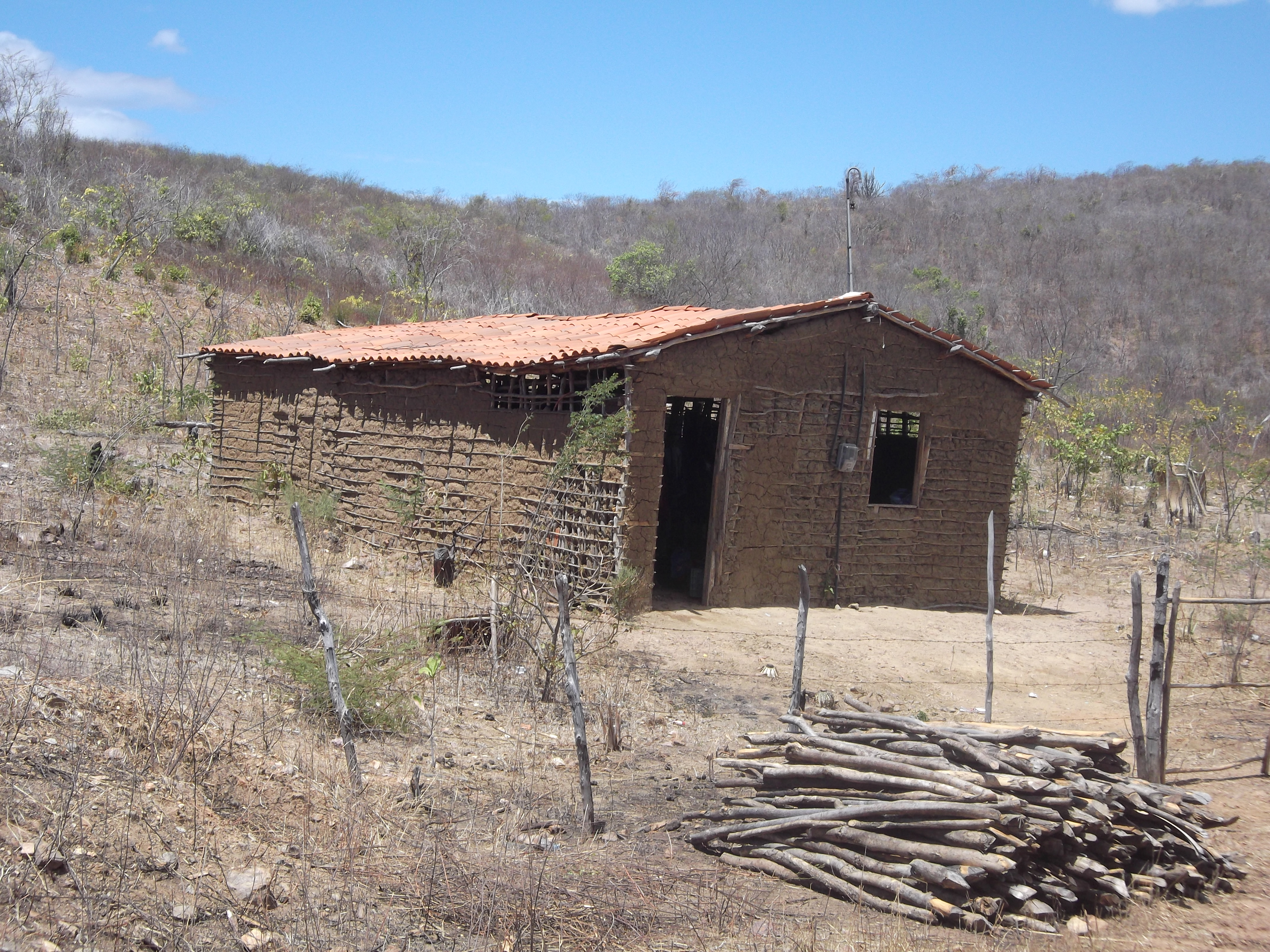
Mud house in Maranguape, Ceará State, Brazil

- Alker – Earth-based stabilized building material
- Contained earth – Earthbag construction material and method
- Earthbag construction – Building method
- Earthship – Style of architecture that uses native materials and upcycled materials to build homes
- Geotechnical engineering – Scientific study of earth materials in engineering problems
- Green building – Structures and processes of building structures that are more environmentally responsible
- Natural building – Sustainable construction practice
- Rural crafts
- Stonemasonry – Creation of buildings, structures, and sculpture using stone
- Tabby concrete – A type of concrete using lime from burnt shell, sometimes considered earthen architecture
- Underground living – Living below the ground's surface
- Yaodong – Form of earth shelter dwelling in the Loess Plateau, Chinese cave dwellings
