= Contained earth =

Earthbag construction material and method

Contained earth (CE) is a structurally designed natural building material that combines containment, inexpensive reinforcement, and strongly cohesive earthen walls. CE is earthbag construction that can be calibrated for several seismic risk levels based on building soil strength and plan standards for adequate bracing.

There is a recognized need for structural understanding of alternative building materials. Construction guidelines for CE are currently under development, based on the New Zealand's performance-based code for adobe and rammed earth.

CE is differentiated from contained gravel (CG) or contained sand (CS) by the use of damp, tamped, cured cohesive fill. CE can be modular, built in poly-propylene rice bag material containers, or solid, built in mesh tubing that allows earthen fill to solidify between courses.

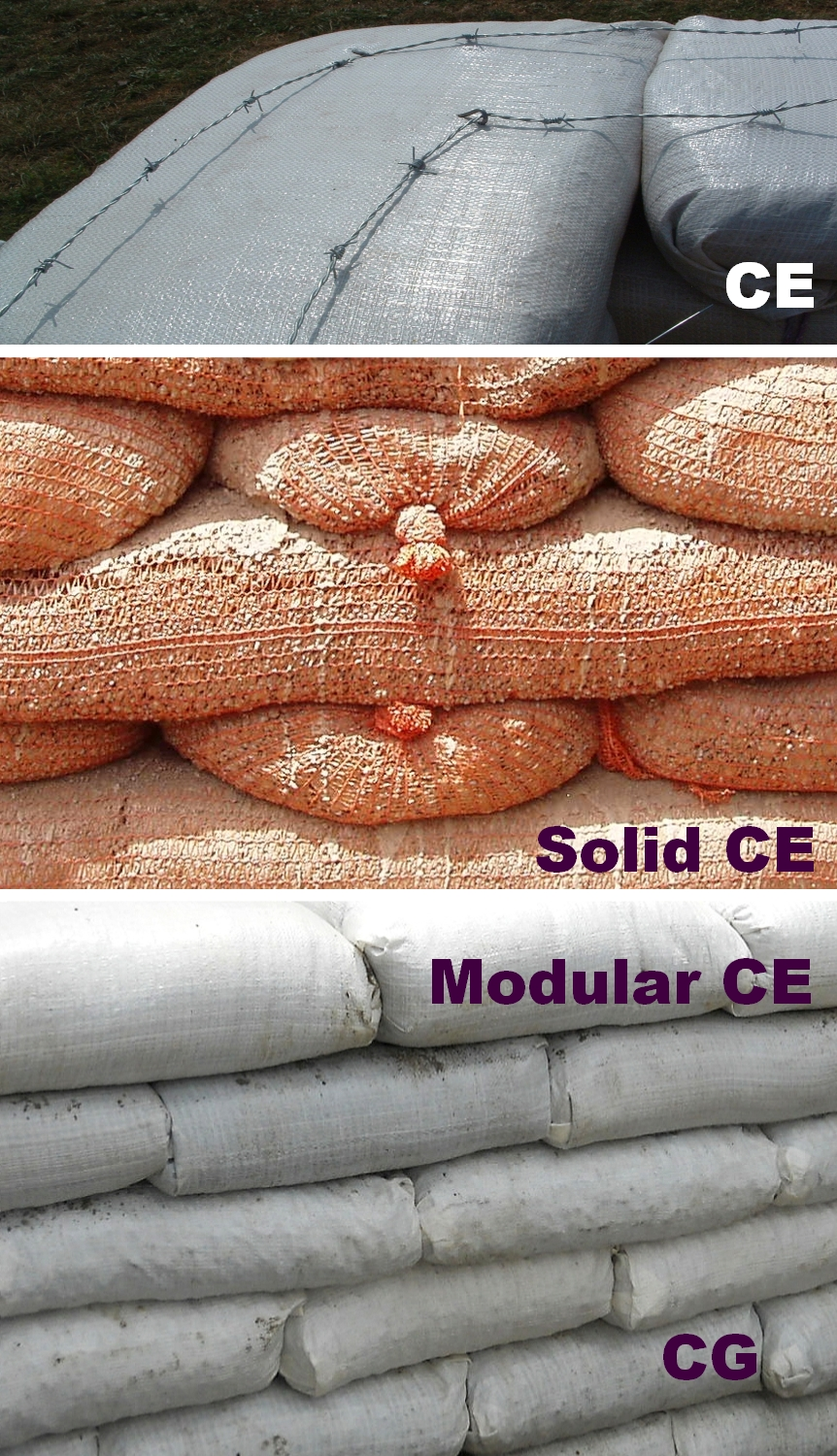
Types of contained earth

CG, filled with pumice or ordinary gravel and/ or small stones, is often used as water-resistant base walls under CE, which also provides an effective capillary break. Soil bags used mostly in horizontal applications by civil engineers contain loose fill which includes both CG and CS. CG courses, like soil bags, may contribute base isolation and/or vibration damping qualities, although out-of-plane strength needs research.

For clarity, earthbag built with a low cohesion fill, or filled with dry soil that does not solidify, is not CE but CS. Uncured CE also performs structurally like CS.

== Earthbag variations ==
Builders used to working without engineers are proud of earthbag's unlimited variations. Few trainers discuss risk levels of building sites, or recommend accurate tests of soil strength, even though soil strength is a key factor of improved seismic performance for earthen walls.

Need for or use of metal components are disputed, including rebar hammered into walls and barbed wire between courses, although static friction of smooth bag-to-bag surfaces of heavy modular CE walls is 0.4 with no adhesion.

Engineering knowledge of earthbag has been growing. More is known about the performance of walls made with sand or dry or uncured soil than about the overwhelming majority of earthbag buildings which have used damp, cohesive soil fill. Reports based on tests of soil bags and loose or granular fill (or uncured fill) assumes that soil strength is less important to wall strength than bag fabric strength for. However, shear tests show clearly that stronger cured, cohesive fill increases contained earth wall strength substantially.

== Earthbag for high risk environments ==
Earthbag developed gradually without structural analysis, first for small domes, then for vertical wall buildings of many shapes. Although domes passed structural testing in California, no structural information was extracted from tests of the inherently stable shapes. Builders borrowed guidelines for adobe to recommend plan details, but code developed in low seismic risk New Mexico does not address issues for higher risk areas. California's seismic risk levels are almost three times as high as New Mexico's, and risk worldwide rises much higher.

Earthbag is often tried after disasters in the developing world, including Sri Lanka's 2004 tsunami, Haiti's 2010 earthquake and Nepal's 2015 earthquake.

CE walls fail in shear tests when barbs flex or bend back or (with weak soil fill) by chipping cured bag fill. CS walls or uncured CE walls fail differently, by slitting bag fabric as barbs move through loose fill.

Because no earthbag buildings were seriously damaged by seismic motion up to 0.8 g in Nepal's 2015 quakes, Nepal's building code recognizes earthbag, although the code does not discuss soil strengths or improved reinforcement. Nepal requires buildings to resist 1.5 g risk although hazard maps show higher values. Better trainers assume the use of cohesive soil and barbed wire, and recommend vertical rebar, buttresses, and bond beams, but rule of thumb earthbag techniques should be differentiated from contained earth that follows more complete guidelines.

== CE compared to New Zealand wall strengths ==
Earthquake damage results confirm the validity of New Zealand's detailed standards for non-engineered adobe and rammed earth which allow unreinforced buildings to 0.6 g force levels.

Although earthbag without specific guidelines may often be this strong, conventional adobe can have severe damage at levels below 0.2 g forces. Non-traditional earthbag built with barbed wire, barely cohesive soil and no rebar can have half the shear strength of NZ's unreinforced adobe. Somewhere between 0.3 and 0.6 g forces, CE guidelines become important.

Based on static shear testing (Stouter, P. May 2017): The following approximate guidelines assume a single story of 380 mm (15 in) wide walls with 2 strands of 4 point barbed wire per course. Check NZS 4299 for bracing wall spacing and size of bracing walls and/ or buttresses. Vertical rebar must be spaced 1.5 m (5 ft) on center average and embedded in wall fill while damp. Follow NZS 4299 restrictions on building size, site slope, climate, and uses. Discuss foundation concerns with an engineer, since NZS 4299 assumes a full reinforced concrete footing.

For comparison to NZS 4299 the following risk levels are based roughly on 0.2 second spectral acceleration (Ss) from 2% probability of exceedance in 50 years. Builders may refer to the Unified Facilities Handbook online for these values for some cities worldwide. These risk levels are based on ultimate strength, but deformation limits may require stiffer detailing or lower risk levels.

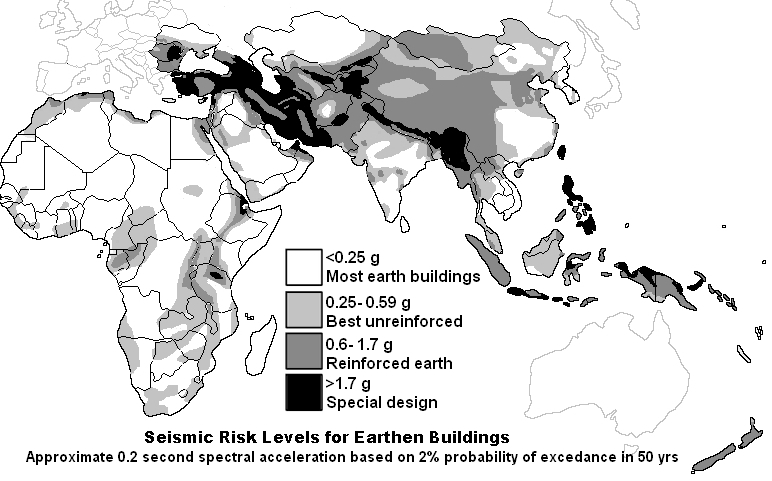
Seismic Risk Levels- Eastern Hemisphere

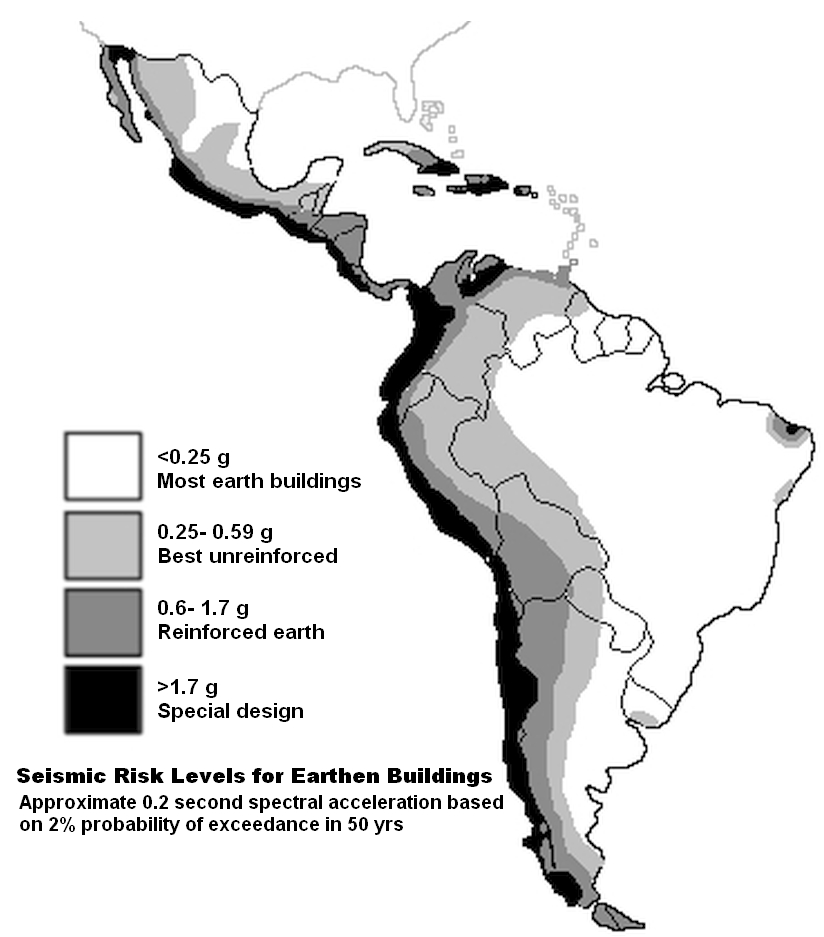
Seismic Risk Levels-Western hemisphere

Medium strength soil: 1.7 MPa (250 psi) unconfined compressive strength

- ±0.75 g risk if 2 separate pieces of rebar are inserted, overlapped
- 1.6 g risk if an entire internal rebar extends from base to bond beam

Strong soil: 2.2 MPa (319 psi) unconfined compressive strength

- ±1.6 g risk if 2 separate pieces of rebar are inserted, overlapped
- ±2.1 g risk if a single rebar extends from base to bond beam

Additional research and engineering analysis is needed to create valid CE manuals.
