= Alshaytan Mountain =

Alshaytan mountain ( also known as Sheytan Kuh) is a prominent, forested hill in Gilan province, Iran. It forms a part of the Alborz mountain range. It is one of the best known monuments in Lahijan. The slopes of Alshaytan mountain are covered with dense vegetation, including tea plants, maple trees and wildflowers.

== Prominent features ==
=== Lahijan waterfall ===
Lahijan waterfall is a 24 meter high artificial waterfall fed by the nearby Lahijan pool.

=== Lahijan cable car ===
The Lahijan cable car is a 550 meter long telecabin network connecting Bam-e Sabz to Taj-e Khorus.

=== Walking staircase ===
The walking staircase is a trail of ~750 steps from Lahijan waterfall to Bam-e Sabz.

The entrance to Alshaytan mountain is located near Kashif Square and along Talai Sabz Street.
