= 1862 in Iran =

- Decades
- See also: Other events of 1862; Years in Iran

The following lists events that happened during 1862 in Qajar era.

== Incumbents ==
- Monarch: Naser al-Din Shah Qajar

== Births ==
- December 13 – Soltan-Ali Vazir-e Afkham, Iranian politician.
- ? – Baqir Khan, Iranian revolutionary.
- ? – Hassan Ali Nokhodaki Isfahani, Iranian mystic.
- ? – Kashef as-Saltaneh, Iranian diplomat and politician.
- ? – Sayyid Jamal al-Din Va'iz, Iranian journalist.
- ? – Soleiman Eskandari, Iranian Qajar prince, historian and socialist politician.
- ? – Touran Agha Khanoum Qajar, Iranian poet; daughter of Naser al-Din Shah Qajar and Khazen al-Douleh.
