= Hovhannes Mrkuz Jughayetsi =

- Born: 1643; New Julfa, Safavid Iran
- Died: 1715 (aged 72); New Julfa, Safavid Iran
- Writing career
- Notable works: Kitab-i Avanus khalifa-yi masihi Usul-i din-i isavi u furu-i an

Hovhannes Mrkuz Jughayetsi (Armenian: Յովհաննէս Մրքուզ Ջուղայեցի; 1643–1715), known in Persian sources as Avanus or Vanis Khalifa, was an Armenian Apostolic theologian and philosopher based in New Julfa in Safavid Iran. He is known to have written various theological and philosophical works in Armenian, Persian and possibly also Arabic.

== Biography ==
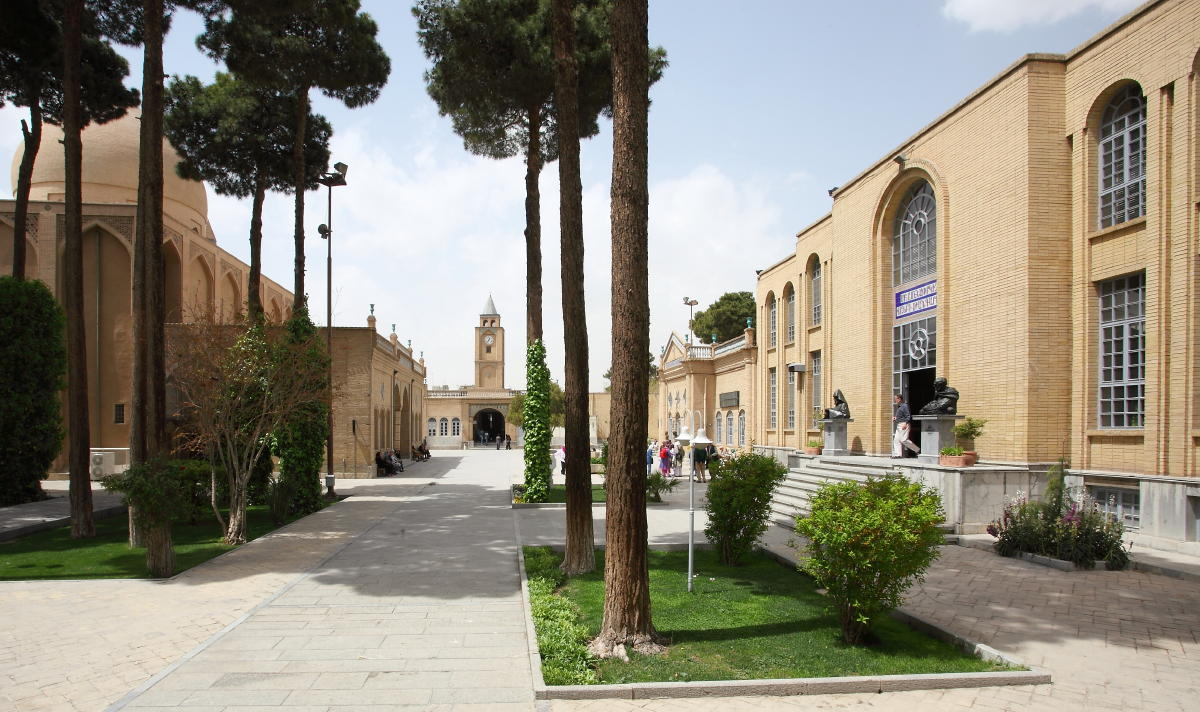
Courtyard of the Vank Cathedral in New Julfa, Isfahan

Hovhannes was born in 1643 in New Julfa, an Armenian suburb located on the outskirts of Isfahan, the Safavid capital of Iran. At the start of the 17th century, hundreds of Armenian families were forced to relocate to New Julfa by Shah Abbas I (r. 1588–1629). In 1669, Hovhannes was elevated to the position of vardapet ('doctor of theology') by the Armenian Church. He thus also became known as Hovhannes Vardapet. In Persian sources, he was called Avanus Khalifa, Vanis Khalifa or Khalifa Avanus. Hovhannes debated both Shia Muslim scholars and European missionaries on a number of occasions. One of his pupils was the Iranian scholar Hazin Lahiji, whom he taught about the New Testament and some aspects of Christian theology. According to Hazin, Hovhannes was well-read in Islamic philosophy and spoke Arabic and Persian fluently.

Hovhannes was one of the monks that Shah Soltan Hoseyn (r. 1694–1722) spoke with about religion and theology during the latter's visit to the Vank Cathedral in New Julfa. Hovhannes is known to have written various theological and philosophical works in Armenian, Persian and possibly also Arabic. However, most studies have been directed towards his Armenian works. His book Kitab-i Avanus khalifa-yi masihi (The book of the Christian Hovhannes Khalifa) is among those that still exist in bilingual manuscripts, with Armenian on the right folios and Persian or Arabic on the left folios, but others, like his Usul-i din-i isavi u furu-i an (The principles of the Christian faith and its practical aspects), seem to have only been published in Persian.

Hovhannes died in 1715 in New Julfa.

== Sources ==
- Halft, Dennis (2018a). "Hovhannēs Mrk'uz ǰułayec'i". Christian-Muslim Relations. A Bibliographical History. Volume 12 Asia, Africa and the Americas (1700-1800). Brill.
- Pourjavady, Reza (2018). "Muḥammad ʿAlī Ḥazīn Lāhījī". Christian-Muslim Relations. A Bibliographical History. Volume 12 Asia, Africa and the Americas (1700-1800). Brill.
