= Hazin Lahiji =

Iranian writer (1692–1766)

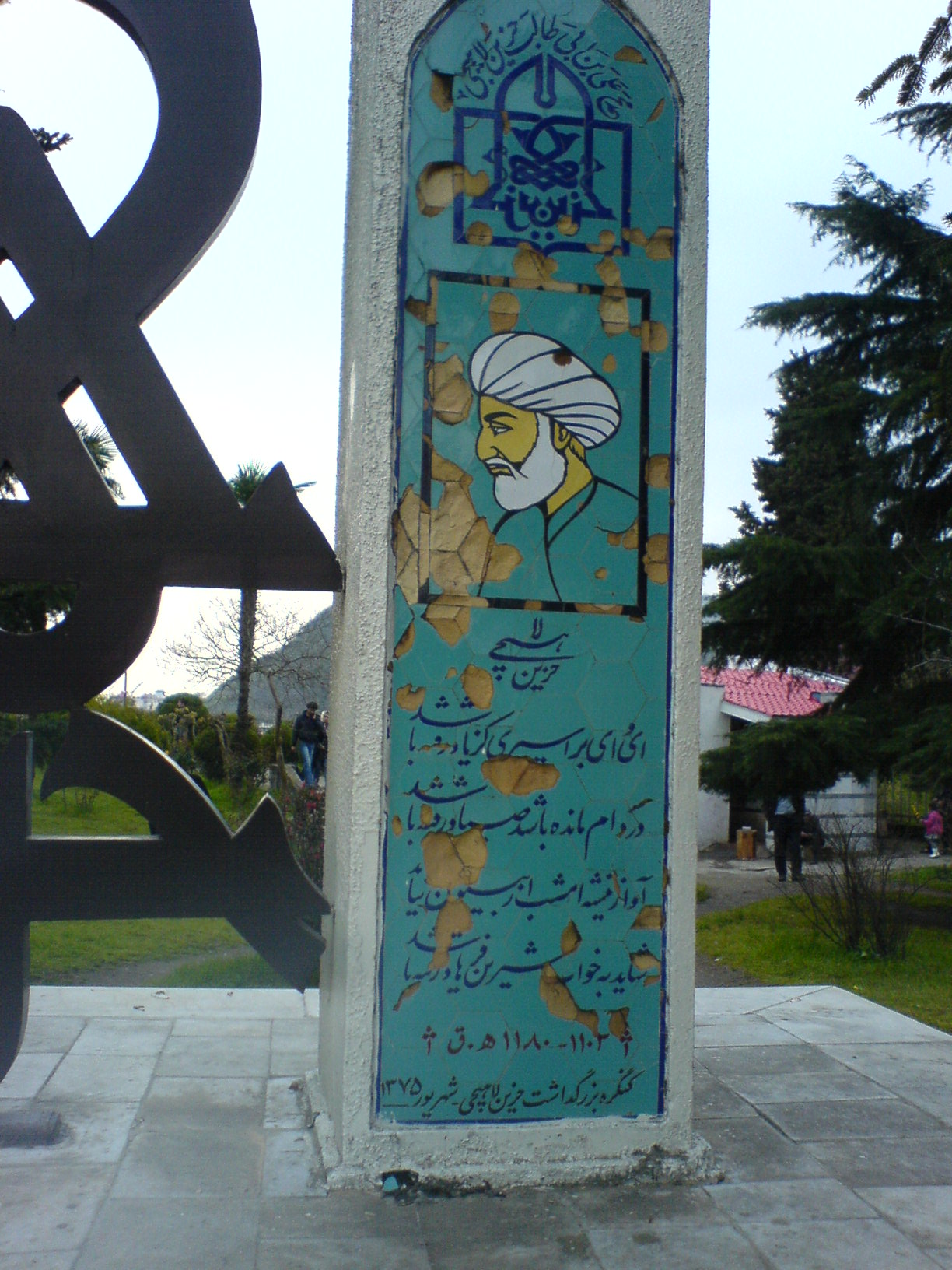
- Memorial at Lahijan dedicated to Hazin Lahiji
- Born: 8 January 1692; Isfahan, Safavid Iran
- Died: 15 October 1766 (aged 74); Benares, Benares State

Hazin Lahiji (Persian: حزین لاهیجی; 8 January 1692 – 15 October 1766), was an Iranian historian, theologian and philosopher.

== Life ==
=== Background, upbringing and education ===
Hazin belonged to a family of scholars and landowners in the northern Iranian province of Gilan, which mainly resided in the town of Astara. They traced their lineage back to Zahed Gilani, a saint from the 13th century. In order to complete his studies, Hazin's father Abu Talib Lahiji—a philosopher from Lahijan—relocated to Isfahan during the reign of Shah Solayman (r. 1666–1694). There he married Inayat Allah Isfahani's daughter and had four sons, among whom Hazin was the eldest. Hazin was born on 8 January 1692 in Isfahan and raised there, but would regardless identify as being from his father's hometown of Lahijan. By the age of four Hazin started studying under his father. Within two years, he picked up reading and writing, and by the time he was eight, he had been taught by Qari Malik Husayn on how to recite the Quran. He continued on to study courses like law, hadith, mathematics, and medicine. During his youth, he also visited the city of Shiraz and its surroundings.

Hazin studied under sixteen teachers, of whom the most distinguished are Khalil Allah Taliqani, Shah Mohammad Shirazi, Mirza Qawam al-Din, Mohammad Sayfi Qazvini and Mohammad Masih ibn Ismail Fasa'i. After completing his official education, Hazin became acquainted with the doctrine of other religions as well as different Muslim societies. He was taught about the New Testament and some aspects of Christian theology by Hovhannes Mrkuz Jughayetsi, an Armenian theologian from New Julfa. A certain Jewish scholar from Isfahan named Shu'ayb taught him about the Old Testament, and in Beyza he was taught about Zoroastrianism by one of their scholars. Afterwards, he researched the variations in Muslim communities' ideologies.

The Iranian historian Masoumeh Salek considers Hazin to be a "broad-minded thinker of the 18th century." Because intellectuals would assemble at his father's home, he got the chance to meet several of the poets and academics he mentions in his later book named Tazkirat al-Mu'asirin. His liberal beliefs and personality were affected by exposure to their ideas. Hazin's father and mother died in 1715 and 1717, respectively. In 1722, two of his brothers also died.

In 1722, Isfahan was besieged by insurgent Afghan forces led by Mahmud Hotak. Having eventually sold everything but his books, Hazin tried unsuccessfully to convince Shah Soltan Hoseyn (r. 1694–1722) and his own remaining family and friends to leave the famine-stricken city before it was too late.

== Sources ==
- Kia, Mana (2020). Persianate Selves: Memories of Place and Origin Before Nationalism. Stanford University Press. ISBN 978-1503611955.
- Matthee, Rudi (2015). "Solṭān Ḥosayn". Encyclopaedia Iranica.
- Salek, Masoumeh (2022). "Ḥazīn Lāhījī". In Madelung, Wilferd; Daftary, Farhad (eds.). Encyclopaedia Islamica Online. Brill Online. ISSN 1875-9831.
- Pourjavady, Reza (2018). "Muḥammad ʿAlī Ḥazīn Lāhījī". Christian-Muslim Relations. A Bibliographical History. Volume 12 Asia, Africa and the Americas (1700-1800). Brill.
- Perry, John R. (2003). "Ḥazin Lāhiji". In Yarshater, Ehsan (ed.). Encyclopædia Iranica. Vol. XII/1: Harem I–Hedāyat al-mota'allemin. London and New York: Routledge & Kegan Paul. pp. 97–98. ISBN 978-0-933273-74-0.
