= Abolhassan Ziyā-Zarifi =

Iranian scientist, academic and political figure

Abolhassan Ziyā-Zarifi (Persian: ابوالحسن ضیاظریفی; 20 August 1926 – 4 October 2010) was an Iranian scientist, academic, author, and political figure. In recognition of his lifelong work in combating pulmonary diseases he was voted an Honorary Member of the International Union Against Tuberculosis and Lung Diseases (IUTLD).

He has written, edited, and contributed to dozens of books, pamphlets, and scientific articles. His books have ranged from the earlier purely scientific volumes (The Bacteriology of Tuberculosis, 1973) to works on modern Iranian political history, including his biographies of Hassan Zia-Zarifi (his brother, one of the founders of Iran's Communist guerrilla movement), and work as editor of the autobiography of Ahmad Zirakzadeh (his wife's uncle, one of the founders of the liberal Iran Party and a member of Mohammad Mosaddegh's cabinet).

== Personal life ==
Abolhassan Zia-Zarifi was born on 20 August 1926 in Lahijan, Gilan province, the eldest son of Hajji Issa Zia-Zarifi and Rukhsareh Monajjemi. His father was a prominent local merchant and a highly pious man. Abolhassan Zia-Zarifi was strongly inspired by paternal forebears, including two of his uncles, his paternal grandfather and great-great-grandfather, who were all physicians. His great-great-grandfather, the physician Mirza Rahim Lahiji, wrote poetry in the early 19th century under the pen name Zarif ("Delicate"), from whence the family name Zarifi. His grandfather Hojatollah Hakimbashi ("the physician") also wrote poetry under the name Atarod. Abolhassan Zia-Zarifi's paternal uncle, Mirza Abolfazl, was a prominent physician with the title Zia-ol Atteba ("Light of Physicians"), whose title, combined with the ancestral pen-name, created the family name Zia-Zarifi.

He showed early academic promise and after finishing the available secondary education in Lahijan was sent to finish his high school in the provincial capital of Rasht.

He attended the University of Tehran from 1945 to 1952, where he met his wife, Dr. Touran Zirakzadeh, whom he married in 1952.

== Politics and the Student Movement ==
Abolhassan Zia-Zarifi became attracted to leftist political ideologies while a teenager in Gilan, at a time when the influence of the Soviet Union was pronounced in the area. In his memoirs he described the invasion of northern Iran by Soviet troops, including an air raid that killed his cousin in front of his eyes.

His travel to Tehran to attend university coincided with a period of relative political liberty and the movement to regain control of Iran's oil resources from colonial powers.

Abolhassan Zia-Zarifi helped organize the first political student union at Tehran University and became the first chairman of the University of Tehran's Student Union, which was dominated by the Tudeh Party of Iran.

Abolhassan Zia-Zarifi's first major political effort focused on students' well-being: a successful campaign to convert the abandoned barracks of US military forces occupying Tehran into a suitable dormitory for university students, an incident amusingly recounted by the noted historian Bastani Parizi.

As the movement to nationalize Iran's oil resources strengthened, Abolhassan Zia-Zarifi gained prominence as a leftist student organizer and writer, often at odds with other student groups, including the liberal Iran Party as well as religious organizations. Abolhassan Zia-Zarifi described in several places his increasing disenchantment with the Tudeh Party's blind and misguided following of Soviet Russia's interests.

In 1952 Abolhassan Zia-Zarifi was sentenced to internal exile for his political activity, but the verdict was delayed, and ultimately rejected.

With the 1953 Iranian coup d'état, Abolhassan Zia-Zarifi's political career ended abruptly. His political activity significantly influenced his younger brother, Hassan Zia-Zarifi, who went on to establish the ideological principles of leftist armed struggle in Iran and is considered one of the founders of the Iranian People's Fedai Guerrillas. Hassan Zia-Zarifi's detention and extrajudicial execution in 1975 consumed much of Abolhassan's energy and placed him under constant supervision and suspicion during the Shah's reign.

== Medical, Scientific and Philanthropic Work ==
Abolhassan Zia-Zarifi began his public health career in 1952 with the Iranian Ministry of Health, and culminated with his position as the Director General of Iran's Laboratories (1975–1979) and his establishing and directing Iran's National Reference Laboratories, equivalent to the Centers for Disease Control (1965–1975).

His work focused on pulmonary diseases, in particular legionnaire's disease and tuberculosis. During the 1950s and 1960s, he was instrumental in expanding laboratory coverage in rural Iran, and adapting international standards for Iran's difficult economic and physical conditions. Poverty and logistical difficulties often prevented rural laboratories from following strict international protocols. Abolhassan Zia-Zarifi and his colleagues set about adapting these protocols for use with limited resources.

As a result, he became a consultant to the World Health Organization in the Middle East, Asia, and Africa, including stints working against cholera in Saudi Arabia in the early 1970s, in Ethiopia, the Central African Republic, and Congo (1972). He remained a proficient member of the WHO's Emergency Team from 1974 to 1996.

In 1971, he led efforts to extend health care and protection from venereal diseases to sex workers in Tehran's notorious Shahre Now red-light district, against significant religious and cultural opposition. During his tenure as Director General of Laboratories he successfully pushed for the establishment of more than 400 medical laboratories in Iran's most impoverished and remote regions.

His crowning success was the establishment of Iran's National Reference Laboratories as a center for epidemiology and national standard setting. The Reference Laboratories significantly modernized Iran's public health system and were recognized internationally as a model for maintaining rigorous scientific principles in difficult ground conditions.

Abolhassan Zia-Zarifi retired from government office in 1978 but continued working in the field of public health. After the 1979 revolution in Iran, Abolhassan Zia-Zarifi increasingly focused on passing on his experience and knowledge as an academic, writer, and health consultant. He was appointed a member of the Physicians' Reeducation Committee in 1990 and in the same year assumed his position as Professor of Laboratory Sciences at Iran's prestigious Shahid Beheshti University of Medical Sciences.

In 1991, Abolhassan Zia-Zarifi was among the founders of Iran's National Institute for Tuberculosis, which is recognized as a regional leader in research and education on pulmonary diseases.

Abolhassan Zia-Zarifi was very active in philanthropic work. After the 1990 Manjil–Rudbar earthquake, which resulted in the death of some 40,000 people and the displacement of half a million people from affected areas of Gilan province, Abolhassan Zia-Zarifi gathered a group of friends who helped rebuild homes and schools, and provided life-time assistance to some 150 people, including full assistance to more than 40 children to attend university. He was also instrumental in establishing the Zirakzadeh Science Foundation, in honor of Ahmad Zirakzadeh, which was dedicated to providing science education to underprivileged children.

== Academic and Historical Writing ==
Among Abolhassan Zia-Zarifi's works are:

- Bacteriology of Tuberculosis (1973)
- A Short History of Robert Koch (1984)
- History of Tuberculosis (1984)
- Management of Medical Laboratories (1986)
- Biology and Bacteriology of Mycobacteria (1986)
- Principles of Tuberculosis (with Velayati, Masjedi, Tabatabaii) (1995)
- Clinical Study of Tuberculosis (with Velayati, Masjedi, Tabatabaii) (1995)
- Nobel Prize Winners in Physiology or Medicine (now in its third printing) (2000)
- Biosafety Guidelines for Health Care Workers against Viral Hepatitis and AIDS (2001)
- Unanswered Questions in Extraordinary Years (Autobiography of Ahmad Zirakzadeh) (editor with Khosro Sa'idi) (1997)
- The Students' Organization of Tehran University (2003)
- Biography of Hassan Zia Zarifi (2004)
- The Story of Life (2006)
- How Doctors Think? (translated from Jerome Groopman, 2008)
- The Fall of Freddie the Leaf (translated from Leo Buscaglia, 2008)
