= Lahijan =

City in Gilan province, Iran

Lahijan لاهیجان (Persian) لاجؤن (Gilaki)
- City
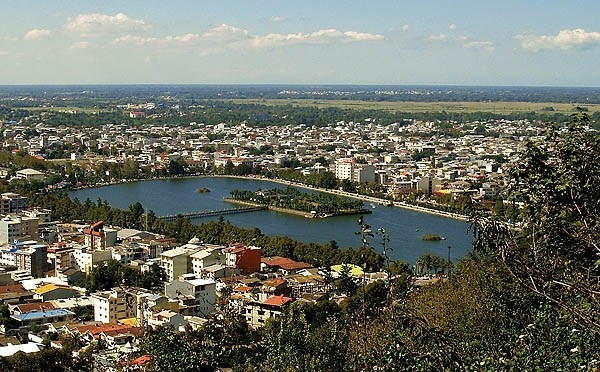
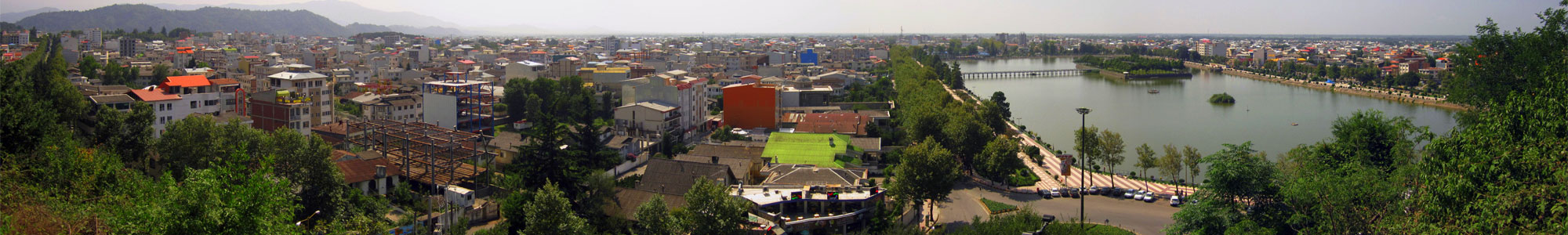
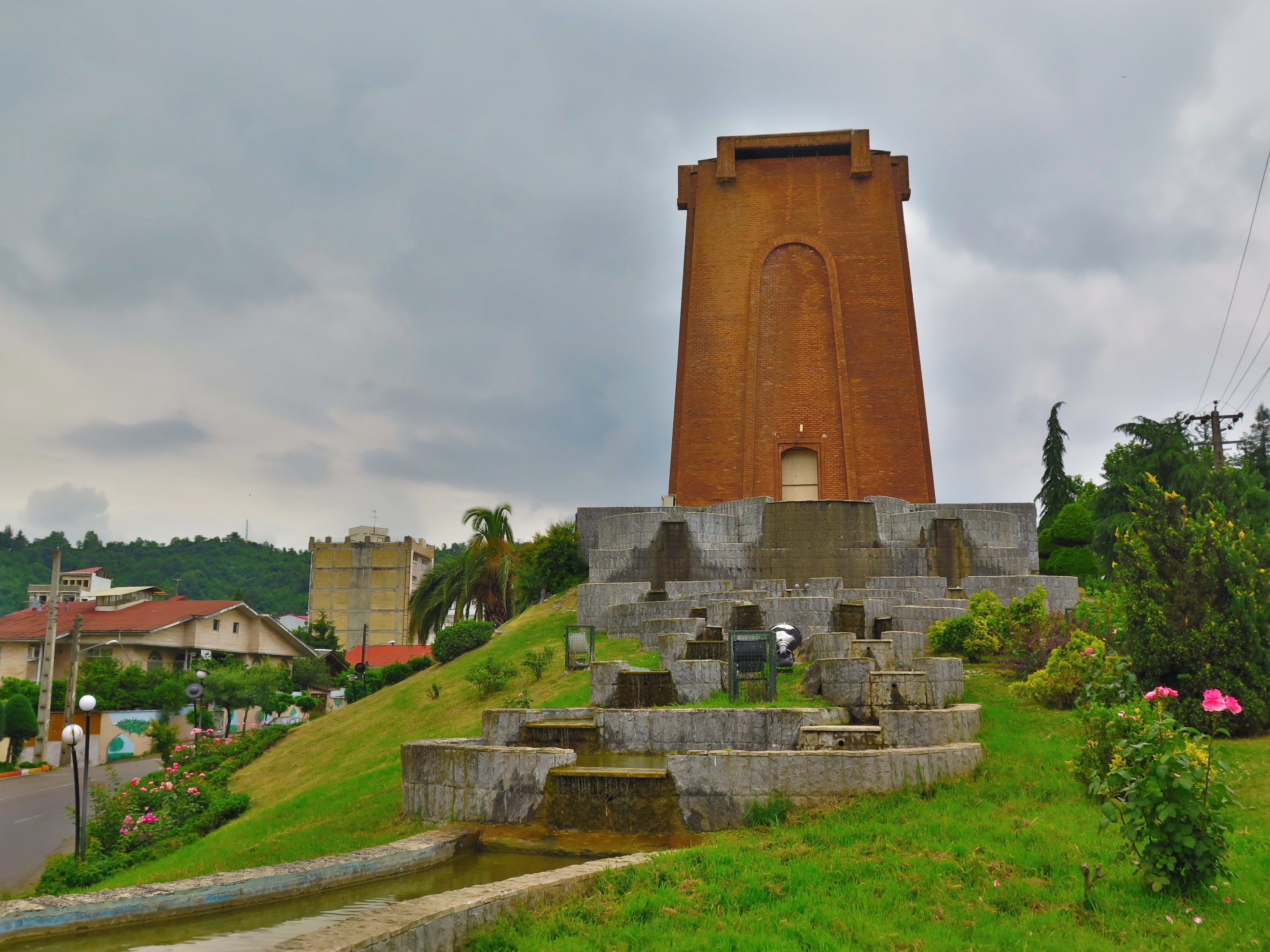
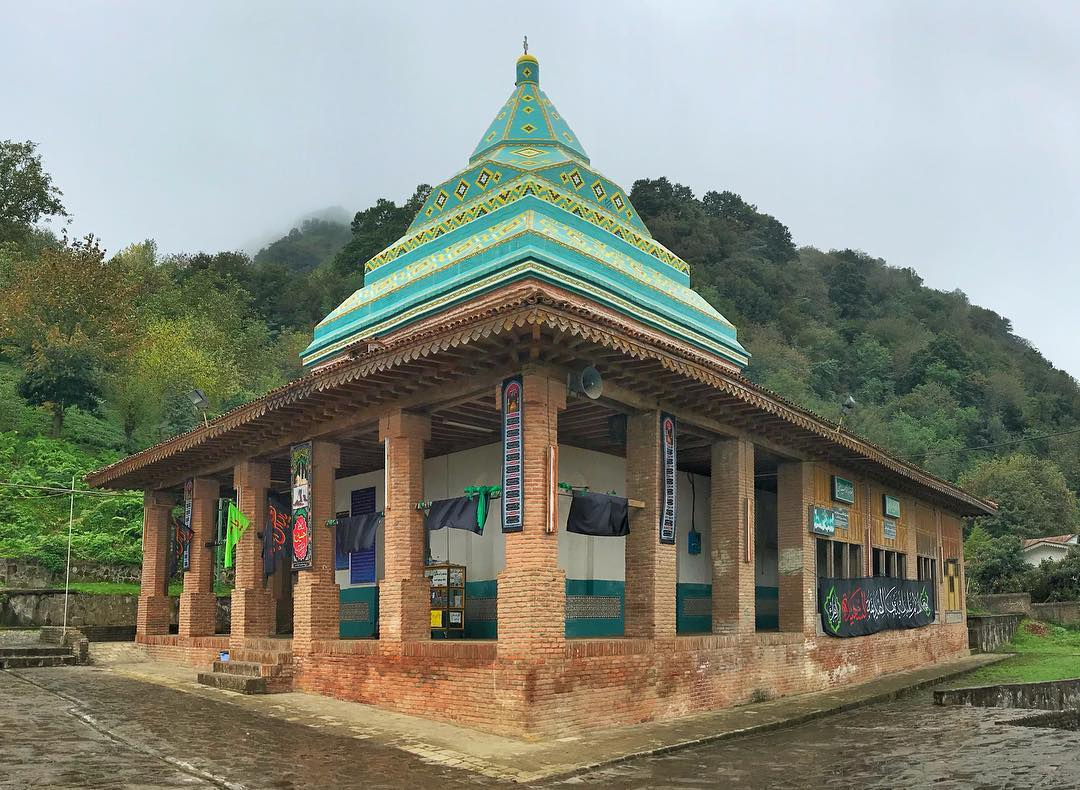
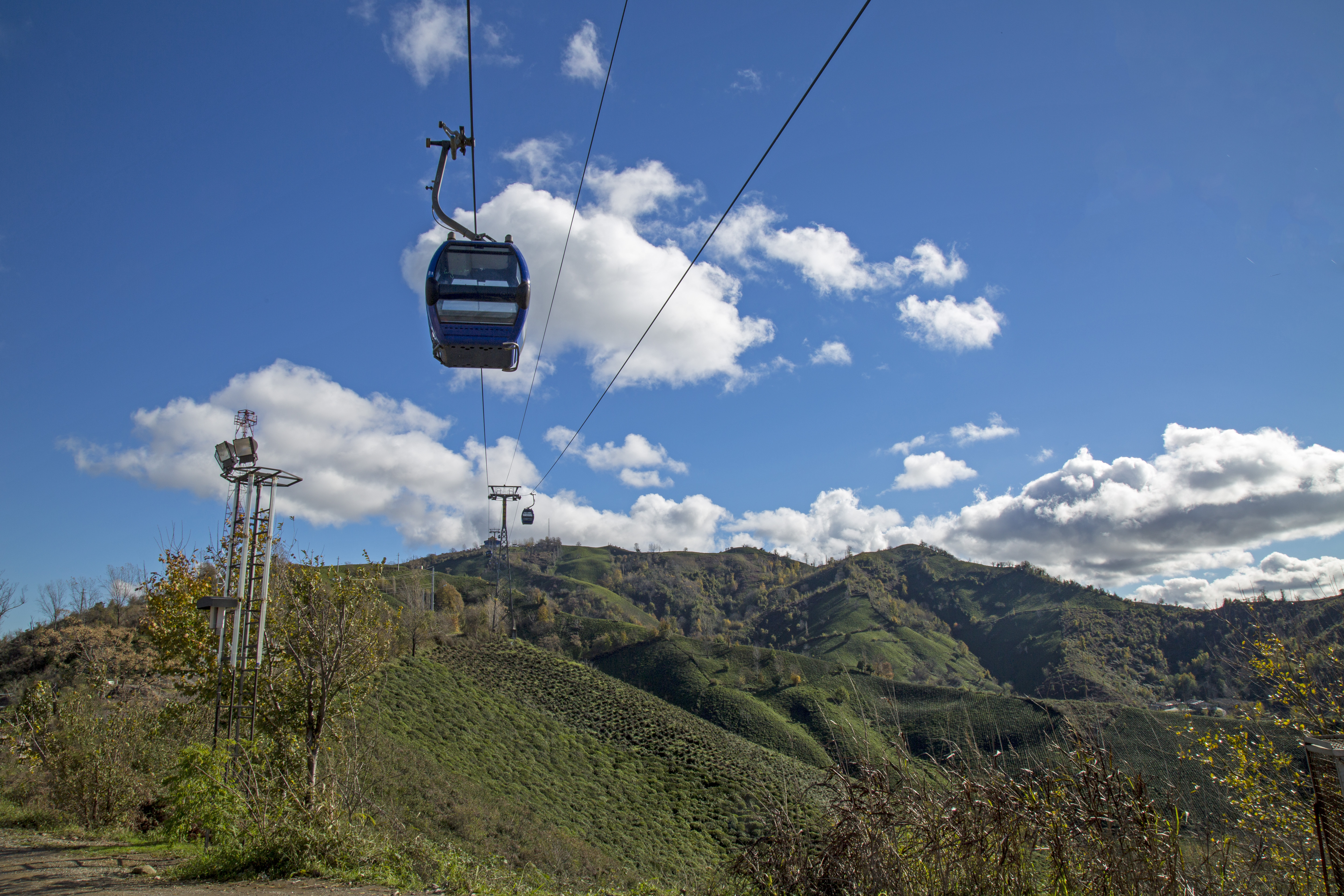
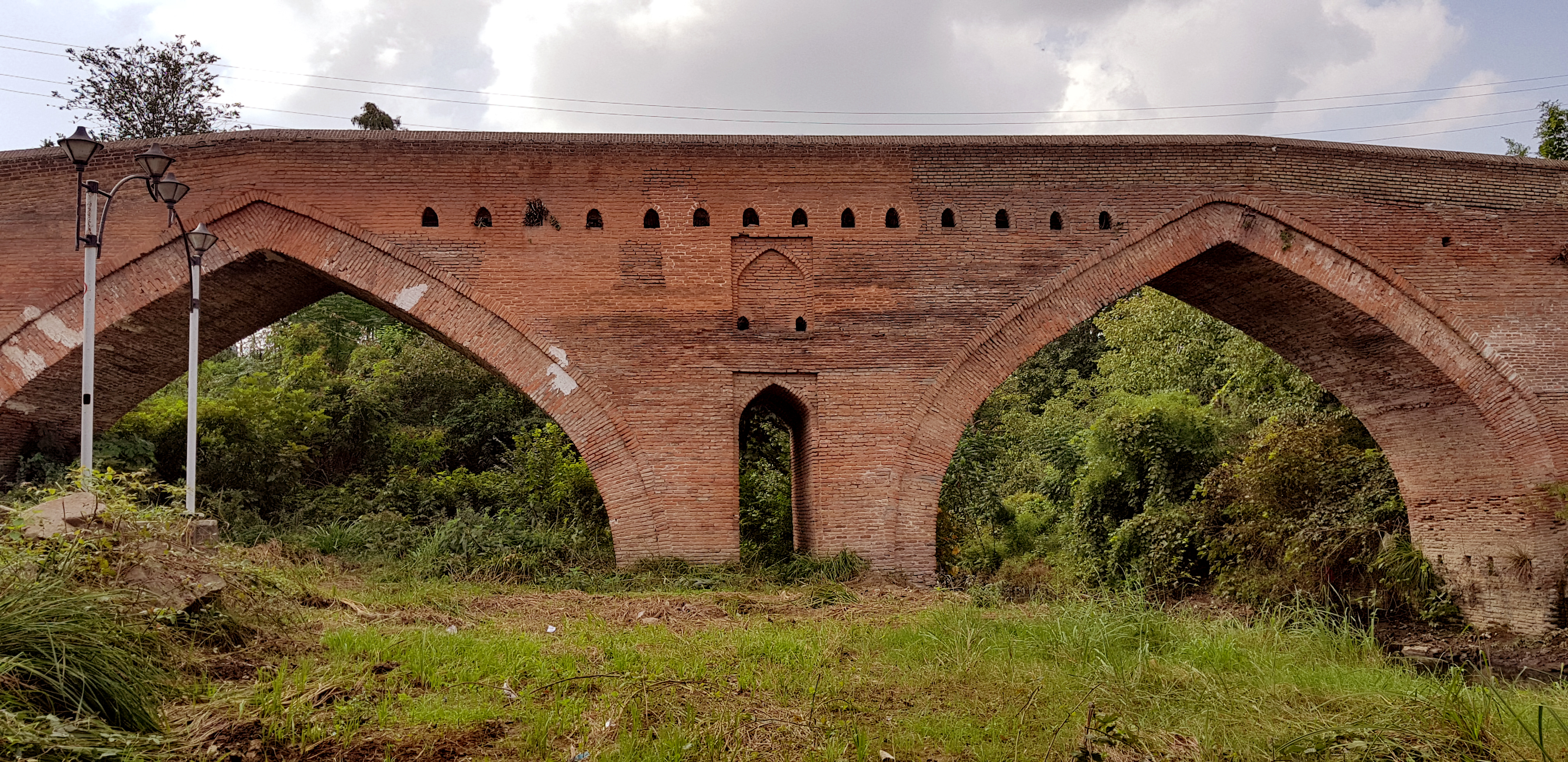
- National Tea Museum, Lahijan artificial lake's view from the top of Sheitan Koh (Satan's hill), Zahed Gilani Tomb, Lahiajan Brick Bridge

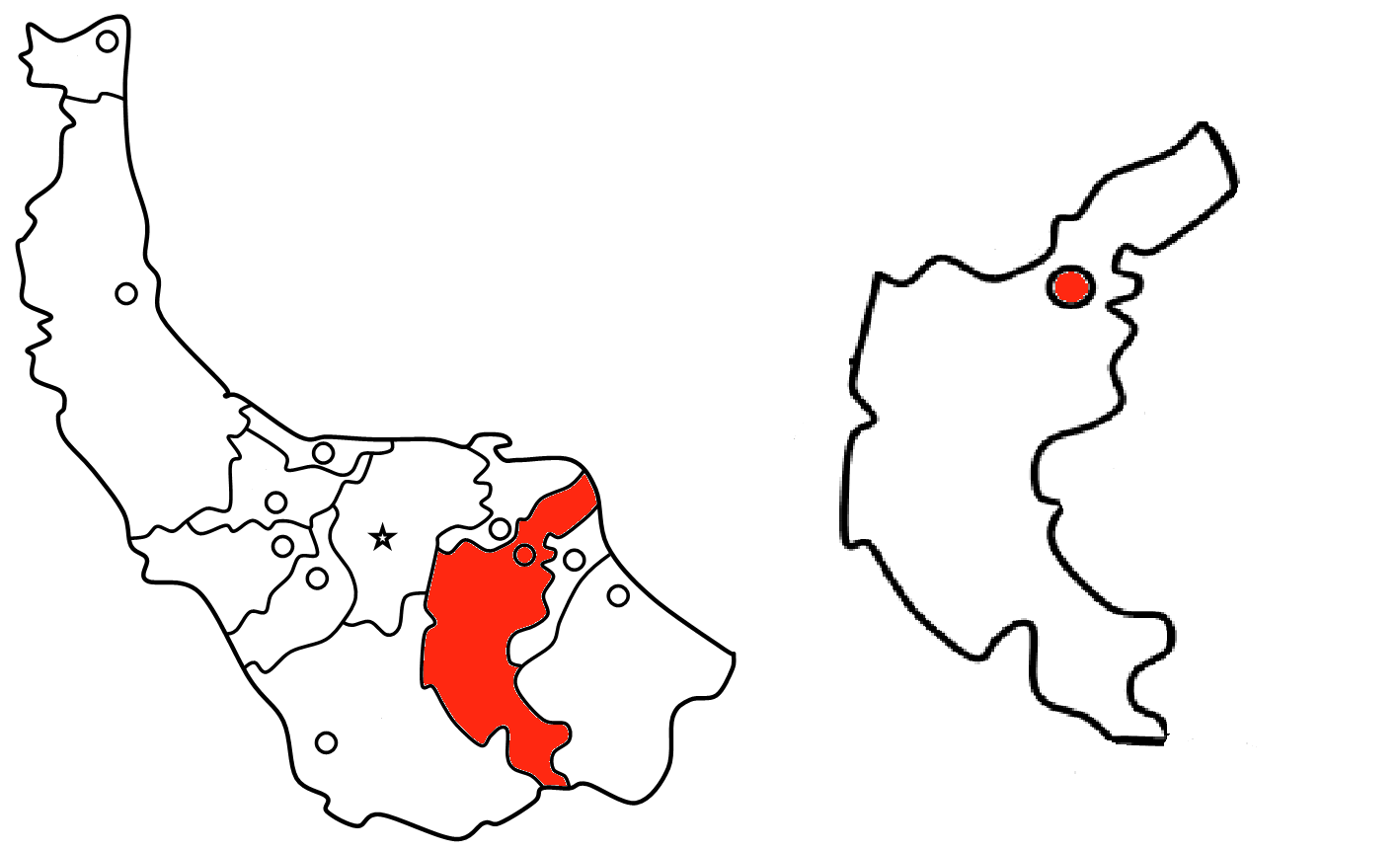
- Location in Gilan province and Lahijan County

- Location within Iran
- Coordinates: 37°12′15″N 50°00′17″E
- Country: Iran
- Province: Gilan
- County: Lahijan
- District: Central

Area
  - Total: 1,428 km^{2} (551 sq mi)
- Elevation: 4 m (13 ft)

Population (2016)
  - Total: 101,073
  - Density: 70.78/km^{2} (183.3/sq mi)
- Time zone: UTC+3:30 (IRST)
- Area code: +98-13

Lahijan (Persian: لاهیجان) (Note: Also romanized as Lāhijān; also known as Lājön (Gilaki: لاجؤن)) is a city in close proximity to the Caspian Sea within the Central District of Lahijan County, in northwestern Iran's Gilan province. It serves as capital of both the county and the district.

Lahijan is distinguished by its blend of traditional and modern architectural styles. Situated on the northern slope of the Alborz Mountains, the city exhibits an Iranian-European urban structure. Its culture and favourable climatic conditions have positioned Lahijan as a significant tourist destination in northern Iran. The city's foundations are built upon sediments deposited by prominent rivers in Gilan, including the Sepid/Sefid-Rud (White River). Throughout history, Lahijan has been a prominent commercial centre and served as the capital of East Gilan under specific rulers. Over various historical periods, Lahijan has garnered recognition as a notable tourism hub within the Islamic world.

== Etymology ==
Lahijan is also the former name of the city of Piranshahr, one of the Kurdish cities of Azerbaijan, and now there are many cities, districts and villages named Lahijan in this county.

== History ==
In ancient times, the Gilan region was indeed divided into 'the Caspian' and 'the Golha' (flowers) sub-regions. Before Iran's present provincial divisions, the Sefid-Rud River did indeed partition Gilan into eastern and western regions, with the river's eastern side referred to as Biehpish and the western side as Biehpas. Lahijan did become the capital of Biehpish at a certain point in time. The region has historically been a major silk-producing center in Iran and was indeed the country's first area for tea cultivation, set out by Prince Mohammad Mirza, known as "Kashef-ol-Saltaneh."

Prince Mohammad Mirza's role in tea cultivation and his strategy to learn the secrets of tea production while posing as a French laborer in British-controlled India is a factual account. He successfully transported tea samples back to Iran, which was instrumental in initiating tea cultivation in the country. His mausoleum in Lahijan is now part of the "Iran Tea Museum."

Lahijan's historical foundation is attributed to 'Lahij Ebne Saam.' Furthermore, the Mongol ruler Oljaito conquered Lahijan in 705 AH, and Amir Teimoor attacked the region. Indeed, Shah Abbas defeated 'Khan Ahmad,' leading to subsequent Safavid governance over the city. Historical events, such as the outbreak of plague in 703, a conflagration in 850, and the occupation of Lahijan by the Russian army in June 1725, are well-documented. Additionally, Lahijan played a significant role as one of the main bases of the Jungle Movement.

== Demographics ==
=== Population ===
During the first census taken in 1956, Lahijan city had a population of 19,877 people.

At the time of the 2006 National Census, the city's population was 71,871 individuals residing in 21,518 households. The following census in 2011 counted 94,051 people in 30,311 households. The 2016 census measured the population of the city as 101,073 people in 34,497 households.

== Geography ==
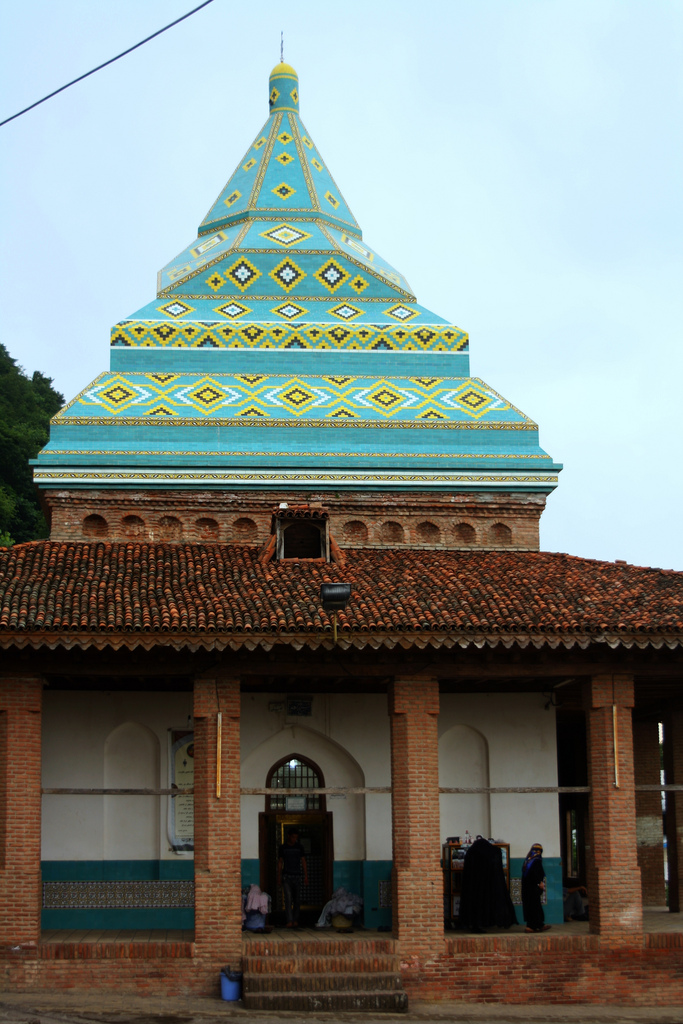
Zahed Gilani's Shrine

=== Location ===
Lahijan is located west of Langarud and east of Astaneh-ye Ashrafiyeh at an altitude of 94 meters above sea level. It is the third largest city in the province after Rasht and Bandar-e Anzali.

=== Topography ===
Except at their northern end, where the Heyran passes at the top of the Āstārāčāy valley does not exceed 1600 m, they are over 2,000 metres (6,600 ft) high, with three spots over 3,000 metres (9,800 ft) including the Baqrow Daḡ, the Ajam Daḡ, and the Shah Moʿallem or Masouleh Daḡ. Their eastern and north-eastern side is deeply carved by parallel streams flowing down towards the Caspian, resulting in a comb-shaped pattern. The western Alborz itself, to the east of the Safid-rud valley, is wider and more intricate, with three parallel (WNW-ESE) ranges; the southernmost and lowest one is represented in Gilan by the Asman-sara Kuh in the Ammarlu district; the medium one is the most continuous, from the Kuh-e-Dalfak to the Keram Kuh, whereas the transverse valley of Polrud clearly divides the northern range into Kuh-e-Natesh and Kuh-e-Somam or Somamus, the highest spot of Gilan. All these mountains have a very complicated geological structure and tectonic history which connects them to the structural complex of central Persia.

Though all those mountains cover a greater area than the plains, these are the most specific features of the province, and locally, the word Gilan often refers to the plain areas or particularly to the central plain.

This large parallelogram of lowlands is heterogeneous and can be divided into two main parts: The delta of the Safid-rud in the east and the Fumanat plain in the west. The former has been entirely built by the Safid-rud, a river with a high discharge and a high alluvial content. The higher part is made out of coarse ancient alluvial material, whereas in the lower part, north of Astaneh-e Ashrafiyyeh, the river often changed its course through thin silty and clayey material; it has thus abandoned its former northeastward course, which flowed into the sea at the prominent angle of the plain near Dastak, and presently flows northwards and builds a smaller living delta jutting out into the Caspian between Zibakenar and Bandar kiashahr.

The Fumanat plain to the west intermingles marine alluvial deposits and former sandy beach lines with abundant alluvial deposits from the numerous rivers draining the southern part of Talesh highlands. They do not reach directly the sea but converge into the lagoon of Anzali with a single outlet to the Caspian through the dune-covered sandy coastline. The lagoon is constantly getting smaller and shallower under the effect of silting. On the contrary, the streams of northern Talesh and eastern Gilan, even the more abundant Polrud, do not bring alluvium enough to counterbalance the action of a coastal current going eastward, and thus could not build more than a narrow ribbon of lowlands, only a few kilometers wide between Astara and Safid-rud and to the east of Qasemabad, and some 10 km wide at the mouth of the Polrud around kelachay.

=== Climate and weather ===
Climate data for Lahijan
Month	Jan	Feb	Mar	Apr	May	Jun	Jul	Aug	Sep	Oct	Nov	Dec	Year
Mean daily maximum °C (°F)	11.7 (53.1)	11.9 (53.4)	15.2 (59.4)	18.4 (65.1)	22.9 (73.2)	26.6 (79.9)	28.5 (83.3)	29.1 (84.4)	25.2 (77.4)	21.5 (70.7)	16.5 (61.7)	13.3 (55.9)	20.1 (68.1)
Daily mean °C (°F)	6.6 (43.9)	7 (45)	10.3 (50.5)	13.8 (56.8)	18.6 (65.5)	22.7 (72.9)	24.9 (76.8)	25.3 (77.5)	21.8 (71.2)	17.8 (64.0)	12.2 (54.0)	8.4 (47.1)	15.8 (60.4)
Mean daily minimum °C (°F)	2 (36)	2.2 (36.0)	5.3 (41.5)	9 (48)	13.9 (57.0)	18.1 (64.6)	20.9 (69.6)	21.2 (70.2)	18.4 (65.1)	14.2 (57.6)	8.2 (46.8)	4.1 (39.4)	11.5 (52.7)
Average precipitation mm (inches)	111.35 (4.38)	114.67 (4.51)	116.55 (4.59)	87.02 (3.43)	37.67 (1.48)	57.6 (2.27)	63.22 (2.49)	78.69 (3.10)	145.95 (5.75)	264.9 (10.43)	198.73 (7.82)	140.96 (5.55)	1,417.31 (55.8)
Average extreme snow depth cm (inches)	5.2 (2.0)	5.73 (2.26)	1.14 (0.45)	0.28 (0.11)	0.0 (0.0)	0.0 (0.0)	0.0 (0.0)	0.0 (0.0)	0.0 (0.0)	0.0 (0.0)	0.83 (0.33)	0.65 (0.26)	5.73 (2.26)
Average rainy days	8.9	9.8	10.8	12.2	10.6	6.8	8.8	9.8	14.8	15.1	12.9	10.3	130.8
Average snowy days	0.9	2.2	0.6	0	0	0	0	0	0	0	0.2	0.1	4
Average relative humidity (%)	77	78	78	82	80	74	72	76	84	85	82	78	79
Mean monthly sunshine hours	110.8	83.7	100.2	111.7	162.1	197.7	196.5	192.4	133.6	126.7	106.7	101.4	1,623.5
Source 1: Climate data(Temperatures and humidity 1991-2021) IRIMO(Precipitation 2004-2014)
Source 2: IRIMO(sun-snow depth 2006-2023) Weather Atlas(rain and snow days)

The topographic position of the Caspian lowlands results in a very characteristic Hyrcanian climate, and the whole province of Gilan belongs to this humid and green area. Prevailing north-south atmospheric currents, humidified over the Caspian, are forced to a vigorous ascendancy by the mighty barrier of Alborz and thus pour abundant rainfall all year long on both the plain and the north-western slope of the mountains. The precipitation regime shows a sharp maximum in autumn (September to December), when atmospheric instability is at its highest point, medium values in winter and early spring, and lowest values from May to August.

The weather system in Lahijan is more favorable than the other points in the Gilan. It has warmer winters and cooler summers. Freezing temperatures are seldom reported in the coastal areas; however, it is not odd for Lahijan to experience periods of near blizzard conditions during the winter. The amount of rainfall in Lahijan depends on the winds bearing vapor that blows from the North West in winter, from the East in spring, and from the West in summer and autumn. These winds carry the vapor and humidity towards the plains causing heavy and prolonged rainfalls.

=== Districts ===
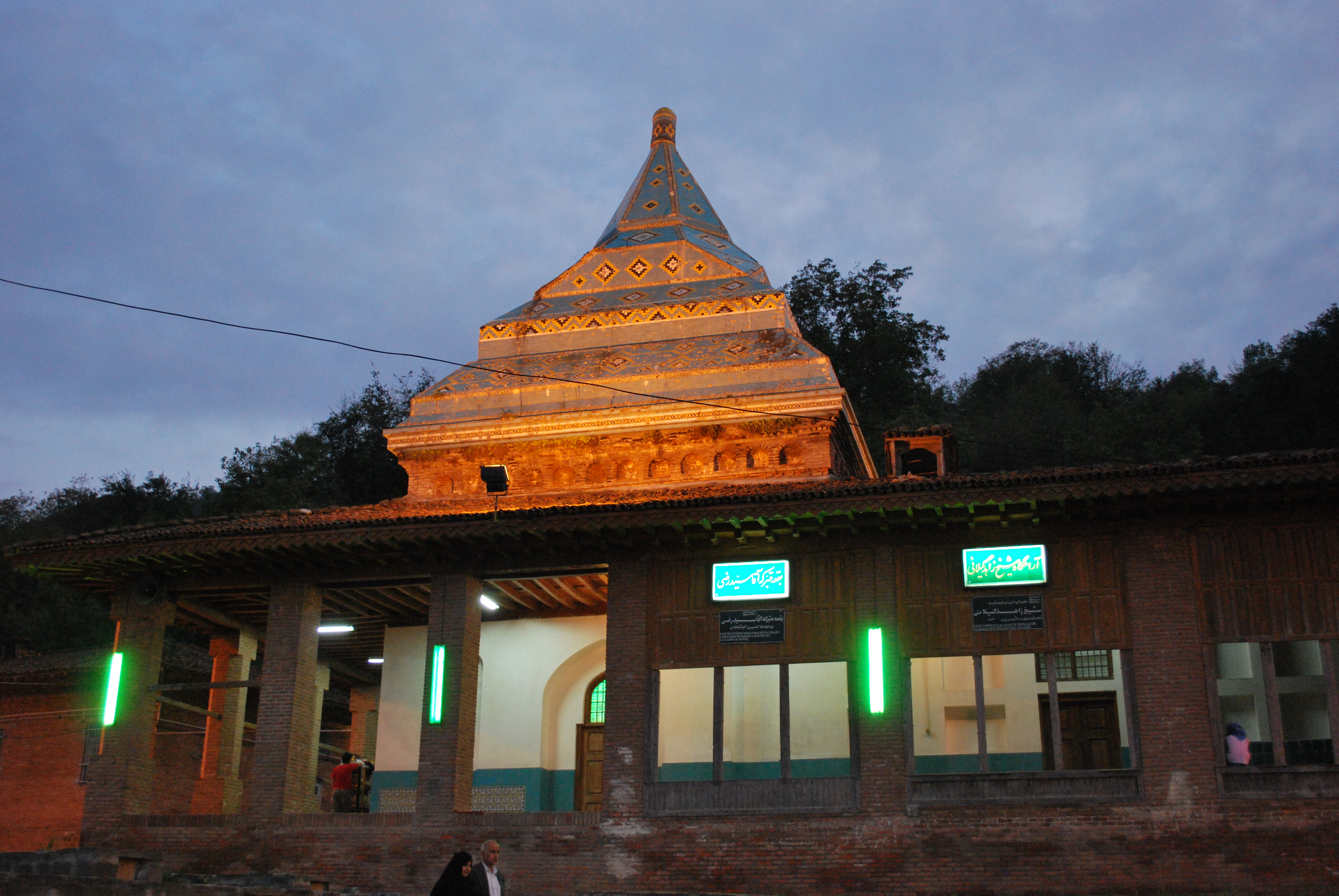
The shrine of Sheikh Zahed Gilani. Lahijan

Keshavarzi - Khamir Kalaye - Gharib Abad - Amir Shahid - Pordesar - Shishe Garan - Ordubazar - Khazar St. - Karegar (Shahid Rajayi)- Andisheh - Shahrake Salman - Shahrake Janbazan - Yousef Abad - Chahar Padeshahan - Sardare Jangal - Shoron Maleh - Khoramshahr - Ghiam St. - Bolvar St. - Nima St. - Jire Sar - Koucheh Bargh - Malek-e-Ashtar - Bazkia Gorab - Shaghayegh St. - East & West Kashef St. - Hazin St. - Sheikh Zahed Village - 22 Aban - Shahid Karimi St. - Bazar Rooz 1 2 3 4 - Shahrake Tarbiat Mo'allem - Shahrake Farhangian - Kamarbandi - Pomp Benzin - Golestan Alleies - Azadegan St. - Taleghani St. - Sher Bafan - Ghasab Mohaleh - Lashidan-e-Hokomati - Lashidan - Tarbiat Mo'allem St. - Assyed Yamani Alley - Abshar & Damaneh - Gabaneh - Karvan Sara Bar - Fayath St. - Hassan Bigdesht - Haji Abad - Asour Meli - Javaher Poshteh - Kord-e-Mahaleh - Namak Abi - Koi Zamani - . . .

=== Neighborhoods ===
Sustan, also known as Soustan, is a diminutive village nestled in the southern region of Lahijan, characterized by its division into two distinct districts: Upper and Lower. The village boasts a notable natural pool situated in its southeastern expanse, commonly referred to by locals as Soustan'sal. The pool garners considerable attention as a prominent tourist attraction within the area. At its heart lies a natural island adorned with ancient trees, enhancing its scenic allure.

Functionally, Soustan'sal plays a vital role in the local agricultural landscape, serving as a critical irrigation source for the surrounding tea fields and paddy lands. This natural reservoir also supports the community's economic activities, aiding in the sustenance and growth of the region's agricultural sector.

Adjacent to the pool, one can find the Shin'chal sand mine—an open mine prevalent in the vicinity. This mining site is of substantial economic significance, as contractors extract tens of thousands of tonnes of sand annually from this locality. The extracted sand contributes to various construction and industrial endeavors, further underlining the economic importance of this natural resource.

Kat'schel, on the other hand, is a diminutive village situated in the eastern reaches of Lahijan. Notably, it holds the distinction of being the closest neighboring village to Sustan, highlighting its geographical proximity to the aforementioned village.

== Tea ==
=== Tea in Iran ===
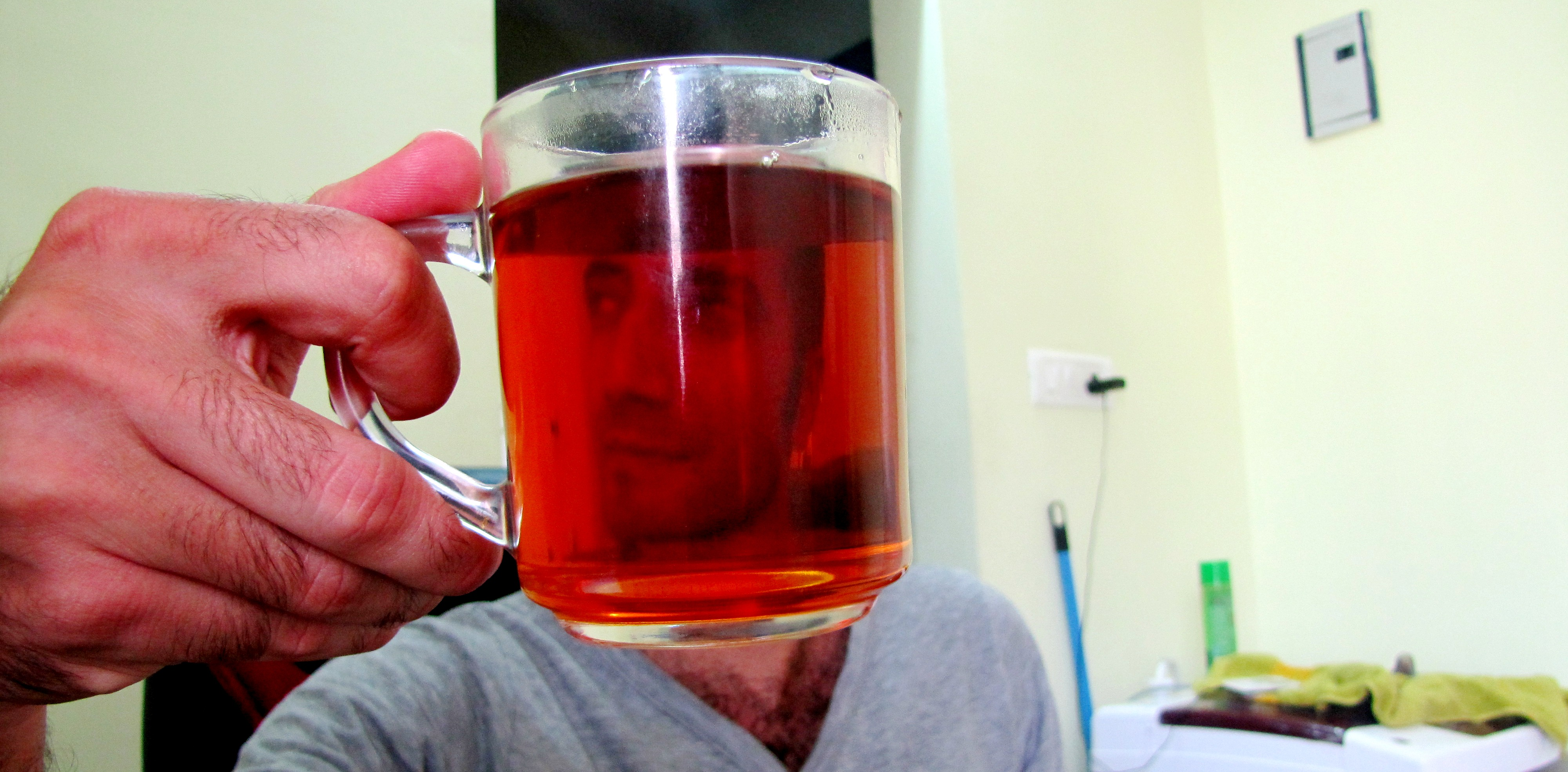
The real color of the Tea

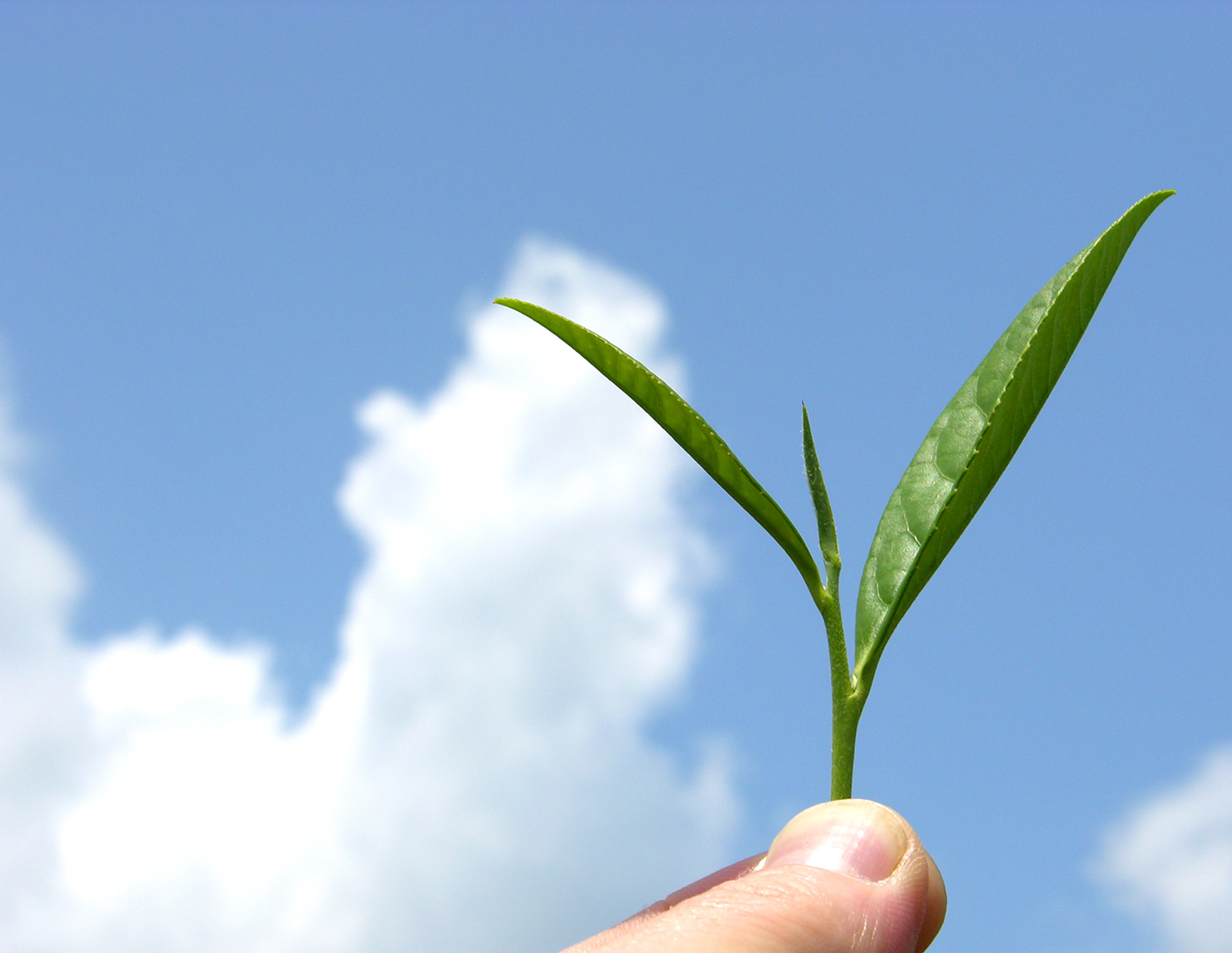
Tea plant.

The history of tea in Iran traces its origins to the latter part of the 15th century. Prior to this, coffee held prominence as the primary beverage in the region. However, logistical challenges associated with shipping coffee from distant producer nations led to a shift in preference towards tea. Positioned along the historical trade route known as the silk Road, Iran found China, a major tea-producing nation, more accessible for trade. This ease of transportation facilitated the increased popularity of tea in Iran over time. As tea consumption surged, so did the demand, necessitating larger imports to match the consumption patterns.

In the year 1882, Iran made its initial attempt to cultivate tea within its borders, importing seeds from India. However, the venture proved unsuccessful. Subsequently, in 1899, Prince Mohammad Mirza, also recognized as "Kashef Al Saltaneh" and born in Lahijan, imported Indian tea and initiated its cultivation in Lahijan. Displaying ingenuity, Kashef, the inaugural mayor of Tehran and an Iranian ambassador to British-ruled India, concealed his true identity by posing as a French laborer to glean insights into tea production. His objective was to obtain tea saplings for cultivation in Iran. Successfully executing his plan, he transported 3,000 saplings from the Kangra region in Northern India, utilizing his diplomatic immunity to avert scrutiny. Commencing cultivation in the Gilan region, south of the Caspian Sea, the climate of Gilan proved conducive to tea cultivation, leading to a swift expansion of the tea industry in Gilan and Mazanderan. Presently, Kashef's mausoleum in Lahijan stands as an integral part of "Iran's National Tea Museum."

A pivotal milestone in the tea industry materialized in 1934 with the establishment of the first modern-style tea factory. The industry has since burgeoned, with approximately 107 tea factories and a collective expanse of 32,000 hectares devoted to tea farms. These farms, predominantly situated on the slopes of Iran, akin to those in Darjeeling, specialize in producing orthodox-style black tea. The Iranian tea boasts a reddish hue and a delicate flavor profile.

By the year 2009, the aggregate production of black tea in Iran amounted to approximately 60,000 tons.

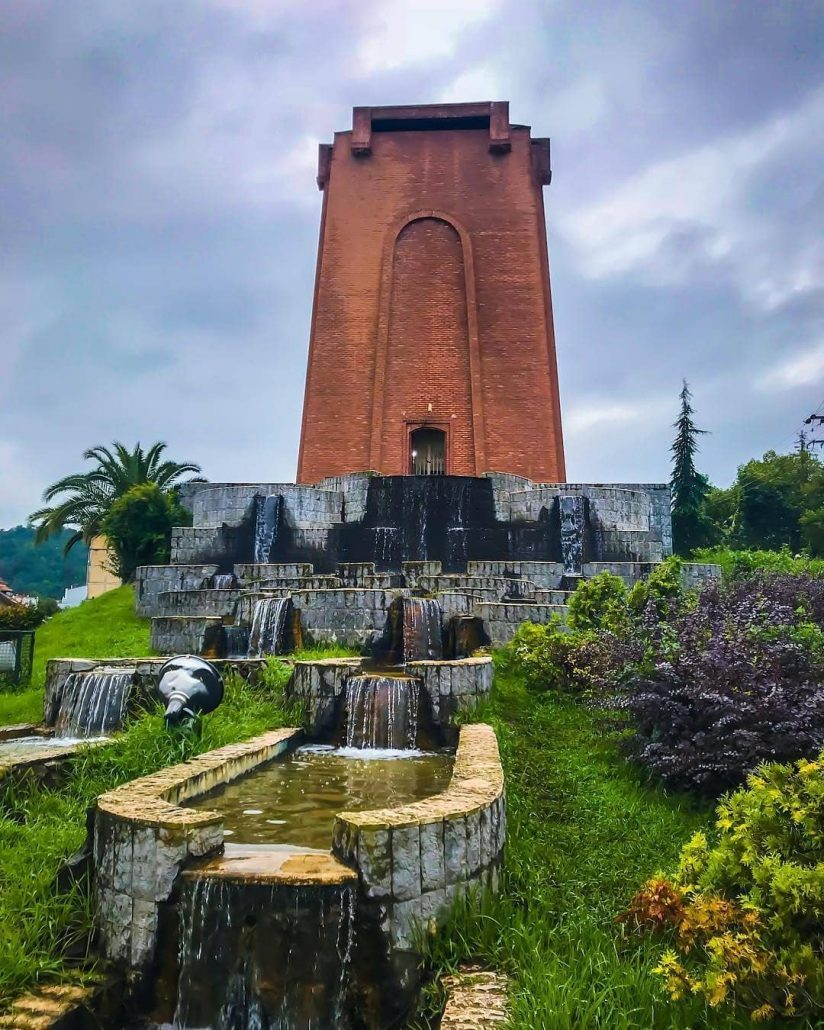
Iran's National Tea Museum and Kashef Osaltane's tomb.

=== Tea in Lahijan ===
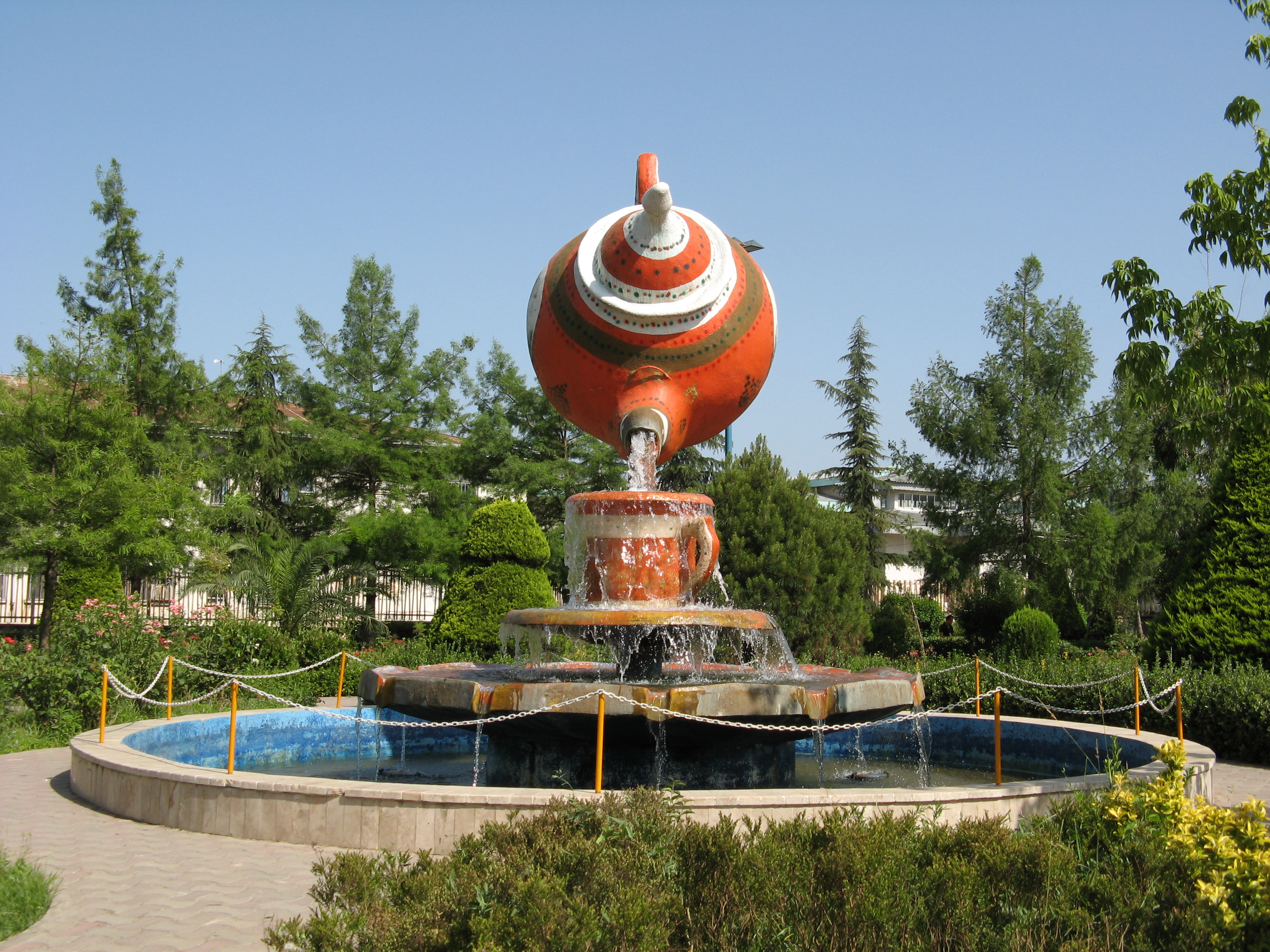
A statue in Lahijan

Historically, Lahijan is the first town in Iran to have tea plantations. With its mild weather, soil quality and fresh spring water, Lahijan stands to have the largest area of tea cultivation in Iran.

Today, the country's tea industry is deep in trouble as the verdant gardens that once sustained millions of farmers and their workers are used only for grazing and other personal purposes. Despite having one of the world's most avid tea-drinking populations, the Iranian tea economy is reeling from an influx of foreign imports and smugglers who, as per the complaints of local traders, often have close family ties to powerful figures in the Islamic government. As a consequence, Lahijan, the historic capital of Iran's tea industry which was once a lush vista of tea bushes is now occupied by real estate. These buildings and structures are built by tea factory owners who have moved into real estate in response to their industry's decline. Several of the town's tea mills are derelict. Others are at a standstill or operating at half capacity. Some 40% of the half-million tea farmers in tea-rich Gilan province have gone out of business because the factories are no longer buying their crops. Hundreds of thousands of pickers have been forced out of work.

== Tourist sites ==
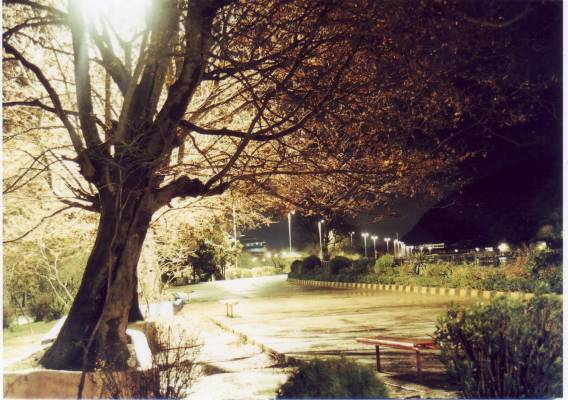
Lahijan lake at Night

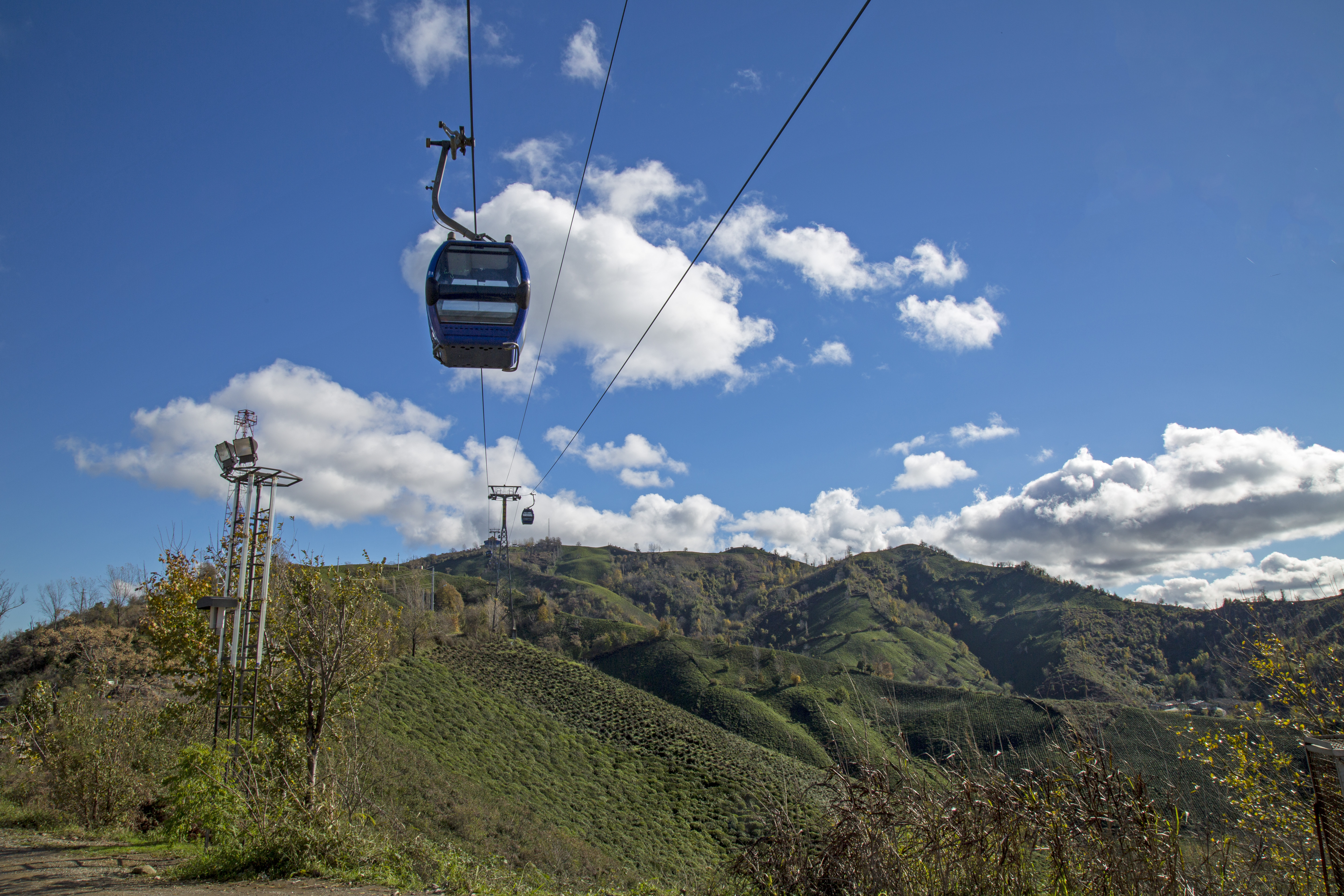
Lahijan Satan's Hill telecabin

- Baam-e-Sabz (lit. 'Green Roof'): It is a flat surface located on top of the Sheitan Kuh. It also has many recreational and sightseeing facilities, such as an amusement park with Ferris Wheel, cafe and gondola lift.
- Lahijan Pool (Estakhr): It is a large pool with a view of the Sheytan Kuh and a boxwood-lined boulevard full of flowers. It is said that this pool was built by Shah Abbas I to store the water flowing from the mountain for irrigation of rice fields. Inside this pool, there is also a square-shaped island that the elder called it "Mian Poshteh". It is said that Shah Abbas built a palace for himself in this place, but there is no trace of it now. This small island, which has a cement bridge leading to the outside, has been turned into a restaurant and a place for holding celebrations.
- The Tomb of the Four king (Char Padeshahan)
- Sheikh Zahed Gilani's Tomb
- Shen Chal & Sustan Pool
- Iran National Tea Museum: The tomb of the Iranian father of tea, Kashef as-Saltaneh, who established Iran's first tea gardens in 1900, has become a tea museum. The structure of the museum is from concrete and stone, which is located in an area of 2 square meters at the end of East Kashef Street on top of a hill.
- Brick Bridge (pole Kheshti)
- Amjadossoltan (Tomb of Farah Pahlavi(Diba)'s ancestor - National Library)

=== Lahijan Pool ===
Lahijan Pool, also known as the Lahijan Reservoir, is an essential water resource situated in the eastern part of Lahijan. Nestled atop Sheitankuh Mountain, this reservoir is enveloped in vibrant greenery and bush, offering a picturesque backdrop. Historically referred to as Shahneshin, the reservoir is pivotal for irrigation purposes, particularly catering to the adjacent rice fields.

Covering an extensive area of 17 hectares and boasting a maximum depth of 4 meters, the reservoir is replenished by water flowing from the mountains. One notable feature is the presence of a prominent structure known as "the beauty in the middle of the lake," historically referred to as "between the backs." This structure is connected to the southern edge of the reservoir through a lengthy concrete bridge. The reservoir stretches for about 2 kilometers, bordered by a charming boulevard that enhances its appeal as a popular sightseeing and recreational destination.

According to local accounts, it is believed that Shah Abbas Safavid, a significant ruler of the Safavid dynasty, commissioned the construction of this reservoir. There were plans to build an expansive palace on the reservoir's island, intended to serve as a residence for Shah Abbas Safavid during his visits to Lahijan. However, as of the present day, there are no visible remnants or traces of this envisioned palace. The historical and geographical significance of the Lahijan Pool makes it an important landmark within the region, attracting visitors for its natural beauty and cultural associations.

== Special ceremony ==
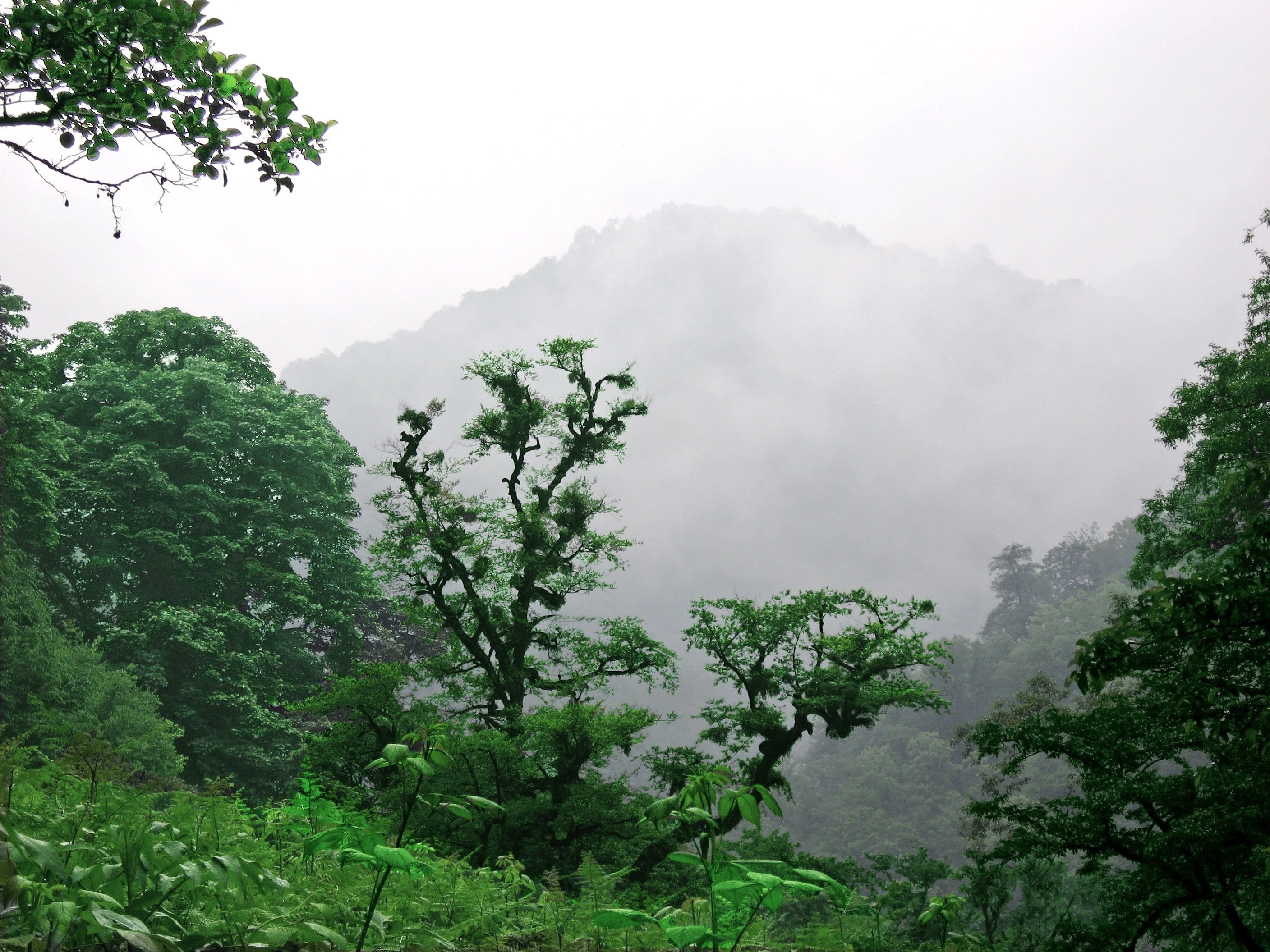
Gilan

The musical instrument known as "Karb," also referred to as "Kareb" or "cymbal," is a traditional percussive instrument in Iranian culture. It is made from two sturdy pieces of wood, typically played by striking them together. The player holds the pieces of wood through a leather belt, allowing for controlled and rhythmic percussion sounds. This design serves as a safer alternative to the previous use of stones for percussion. Karb is an integral part of traditional music and is often played in ensembles to create a specific rhythmic pattern. It is particularly popular in various regions of Iran, including Aran, Kashan, select districts in Semnan, as well as Sabzevar and Lahijan.

The traditional ritual of stone beating, known as "karb" in Persian, is a symbolic practice prevalent in several parts of Iran, often associated with mourning and commemorative ceremonies. The ritual involves the rhythmic striking of two pieces of stone against the sides of a mourner's body, following specific methods and movements, accompanied by mournful songs. However, due to the potential physical harm caused by the stones, wooden sticks are gradually supplanting them in this ritual. Contemporary terms such as "Karbzani" or "Karebzani," along with playing cymbals and ratchets, are now used in place of stone beating. Notably, regions like Mazandaran and Komesh, situated south of the Alborz Mountains, use the term "Kareb," while Gilan employs "Karb," and in Aran (Kashan), the term "cymbal" is customary.

The performance of this ceremony demands considerable physical strength from the participants and remains a significant cultural and religious practice in certain areas, such as Lahijan and Aran (Kashan), as well as Semnan and Sabzevar.

In addition to Karb, another significant aspect of musical traditions during rituals is "Karna Nawazi," involving the use of "Karna," which translates to trumpet or horn. In certain villages in Gilan, including Mashk, Lasht, and Rudbeneh in Lahijan, long Karnas, constructed from reeds with a staff-like bend made of squash at one end and a wooden mouthpiece at the other, are employed during Ashura ceremonies. These unique trumpets, known as "martyrdom songs," find use in passion plays and other Ashurayi ceremonies, with alternating performances by a singer and a group of Karna players during specific rituals. This practice reflects the rich cultural and musical diversity present in various regions of Iran.

== Cuisine ==
The following are some popular dishes in Lahijanian cuisine:

Lahijanian cuisine is characterized by a diverse array of dishes, each holding a significant place in the culinary traditions of the region. Among the popular dishes are Mirza Ghassemi, Torshe'tare, Bademjan'khoroush, Sir'vabichke Morgh-e-Lako, Baghali ghatogh, Torshe Tare, Koii Khorosh, Sir ghalieh, Alo Mosama, Naz Khatoon, Chaghar Tameh, Anarbij, Shesh Andaz, Shirin Tare, Sirabij, Khali Ovei, Chakhardameh, Motonjen, Loongi, Ghorabij, Mahi Febij, Vavishkah, Torshe Shami, Shami, Halichoe, Kaleh kabab, and Tabironey.

=== Cookies (kulucheh) ===
One particularly renowned element of Lahijanian cuisine is the traditional Persian-style filled cookie known as "Kulucheh." These cookies, widely recognized and sought after, are marketed globally. Kulucheh features a crusty shell enveloping a soft and flavorful filling. The filling comes in a variety of options, including cocoa, walnut, and coconut flavors. The age-old production of these cookies in Gilan has adhered to traditional methods over centuries. Four well-known brands associated with the production of Kulucheh cookies in Lahijan include Noosheen, Grand Naderi, Naderi, Nadi, and Peyman, all contributing to the reputation of Lahijan's culinary heritage.

== Cinema and theater centers ==
There were two movie centers in Lahijan, Be'sat and Shahr-e-Sabz. They were once important destinations for the people of Lahijan. However, around 10 years ago, because of economic meltdown in the city, both movie centers went bankrupt, resulting in their shut down. Despite this, Shahr-e-Sabz was rebuilt and re-opened in 2012.

== Universities and schools ==
There are two kinds of university in Lahijan, state and non-state (semi-private) universities.

=== State universities ===
- Hazrat Zeinab School of Nursing and Midwifery, East Gilan
- Lahijan Payam-Noor University
- Tarbiat Modarres College, Lahijan

=== Non-state universities ===
- Islamic Azad University, Lahijan Branch

== Notable people from Lahijan ==
- Ebu Nasr Mansur (960-1036), mathematician
- Ismail I, Shahanshah of Iran, founder of the Safavid state
- Hazin Lahiji, Theologian, historian, philosopher
- Hasan Lahiji (1620- 1709), theologian and philosopher
- Mohammad Ali Mojtahedi Gilani - Founder of Sharif University of Technology and Principal of Alborz High School.
- Hazin Lahiji - Iranian Poet and Scholar
- Sheikh Zahed Gilani - Grandmaster of the famed Zahediyeh Sufi Order at Lahijan
- Farideh Ghotbi (1920–2000), mother of Farah Diba Pahlavi, former Shahbanu.
- Hassan Zia-Zarifi - Iranian intellectual and one of the founders of the communist guerrilla movement in Iran
- Bijan Najdi - Poet and Writer
- Reza Qotbi - Head of Iranian National TV
- Abolhassan Ziyā-Zarifi, public health specialist

== Gallery ==
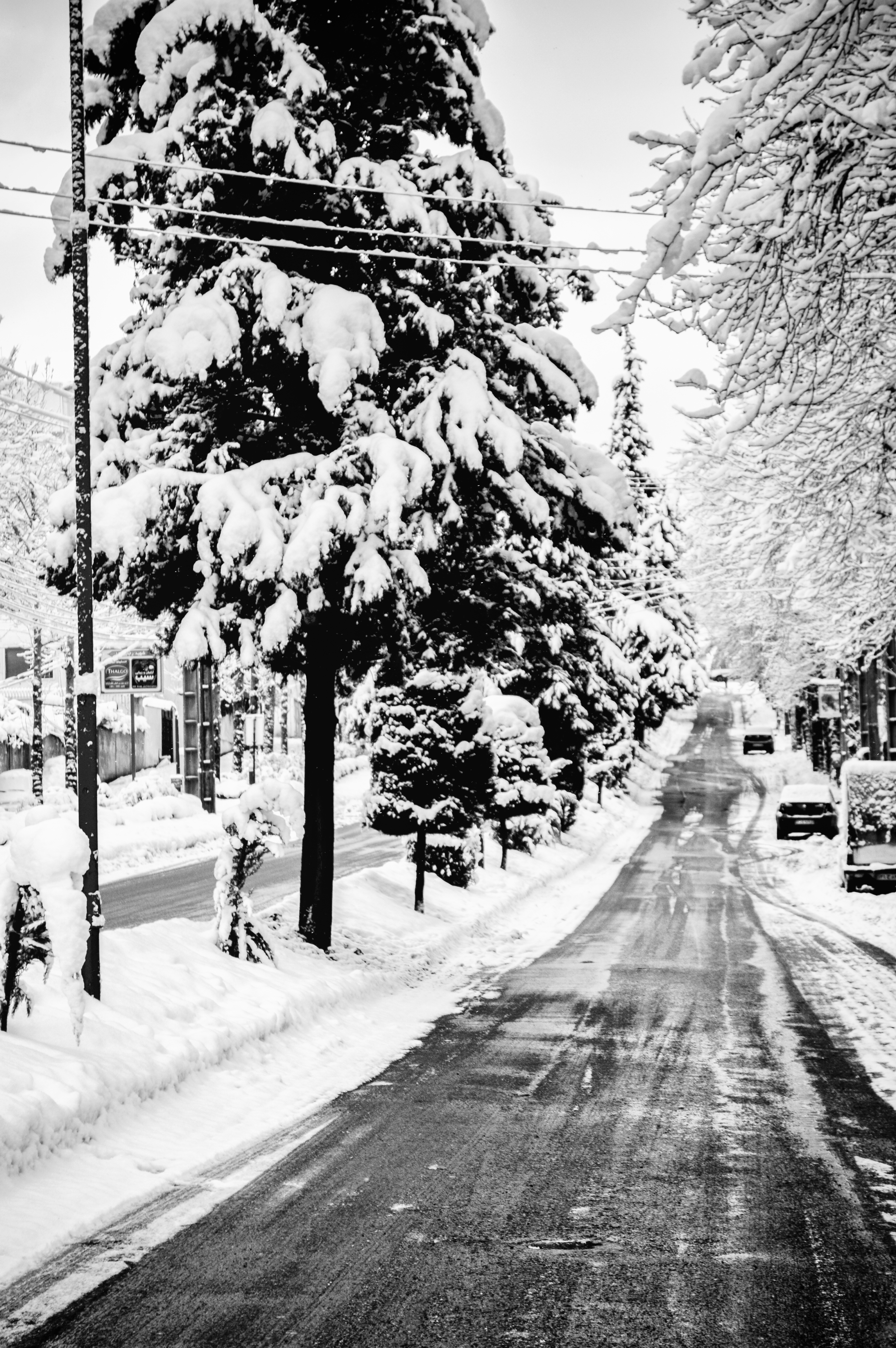
Lahijan in winter

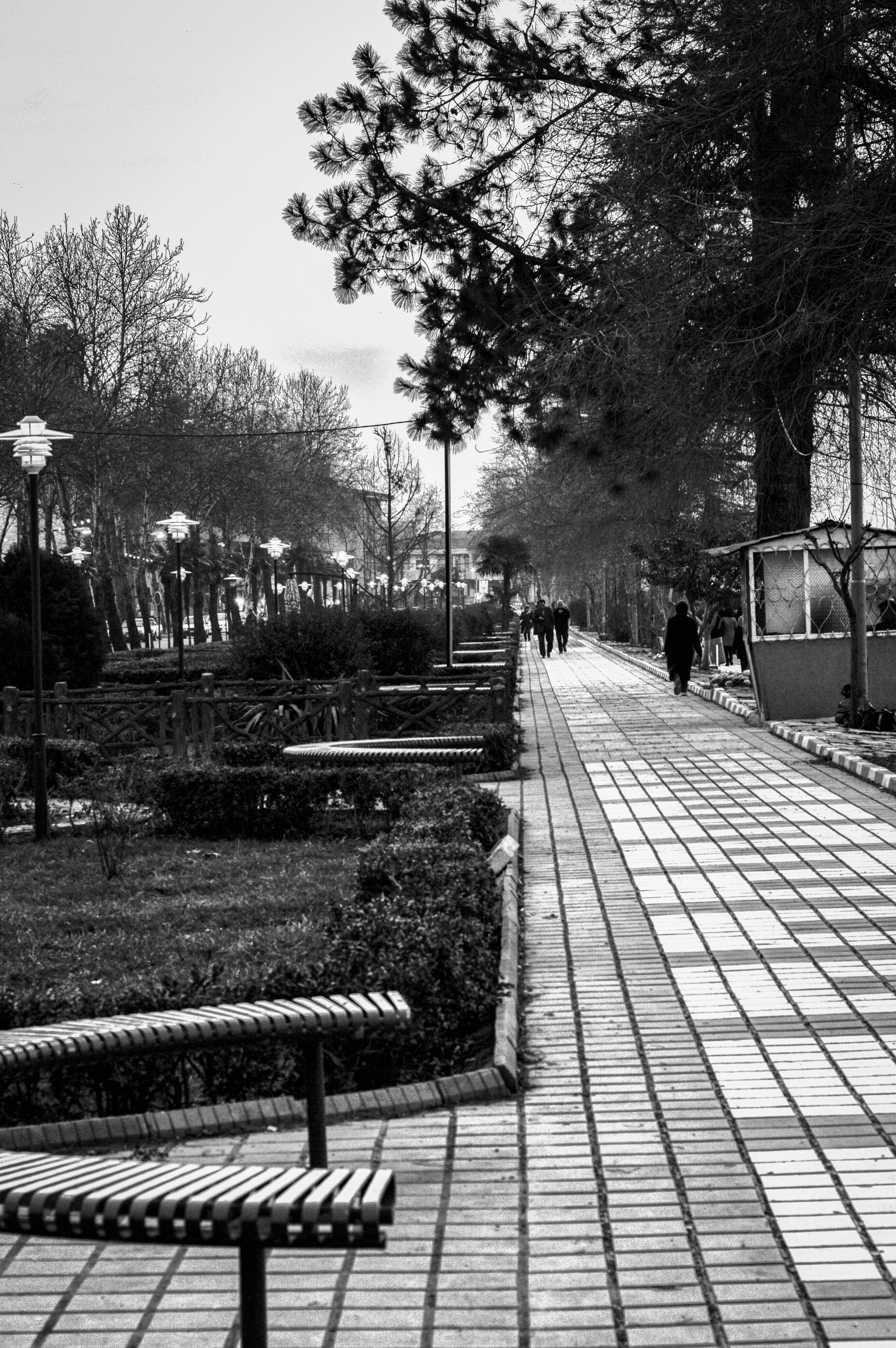
The sidewalk around the Lahijan lake

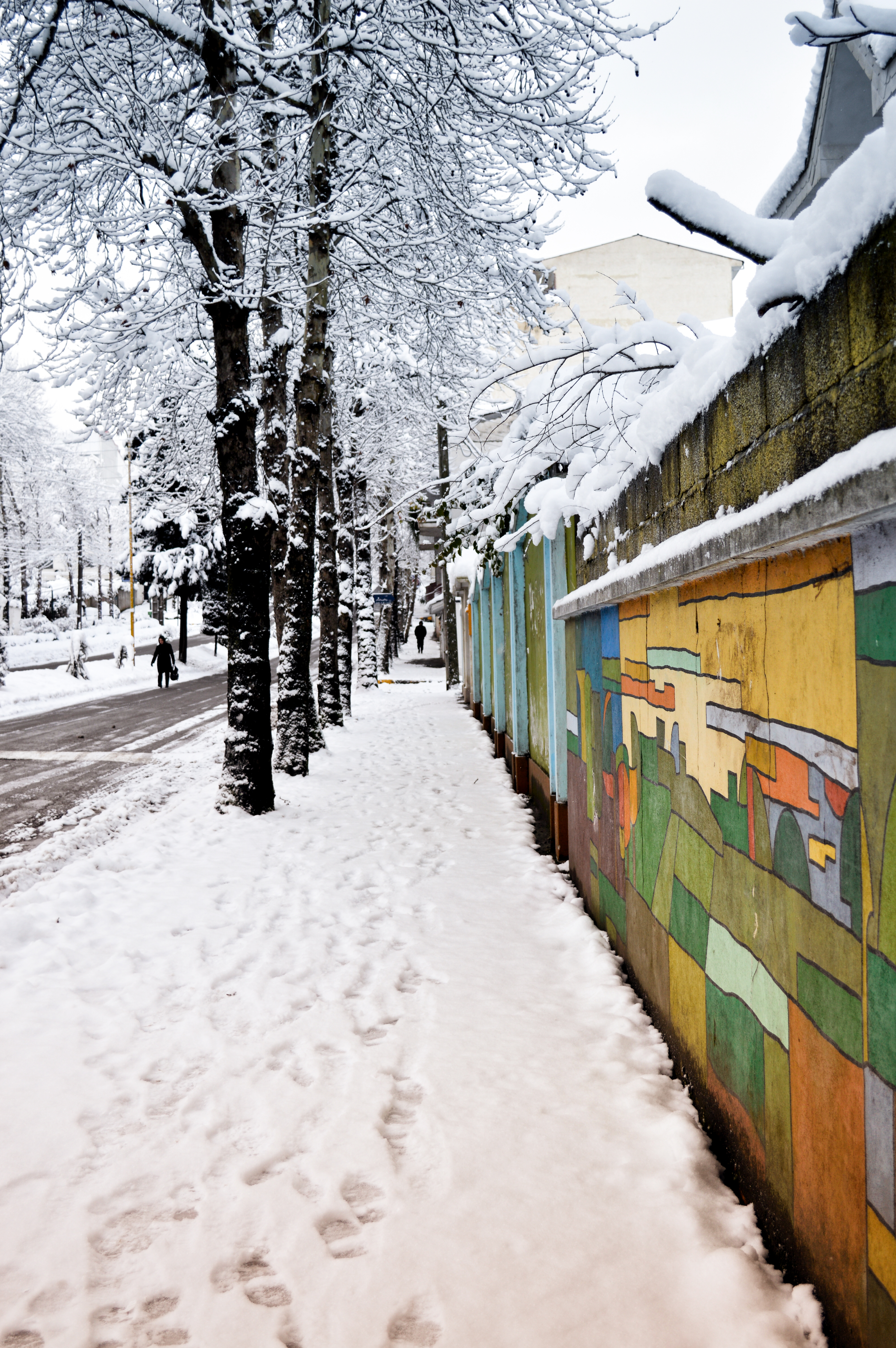
A sidewalk in lahijan after morning snow

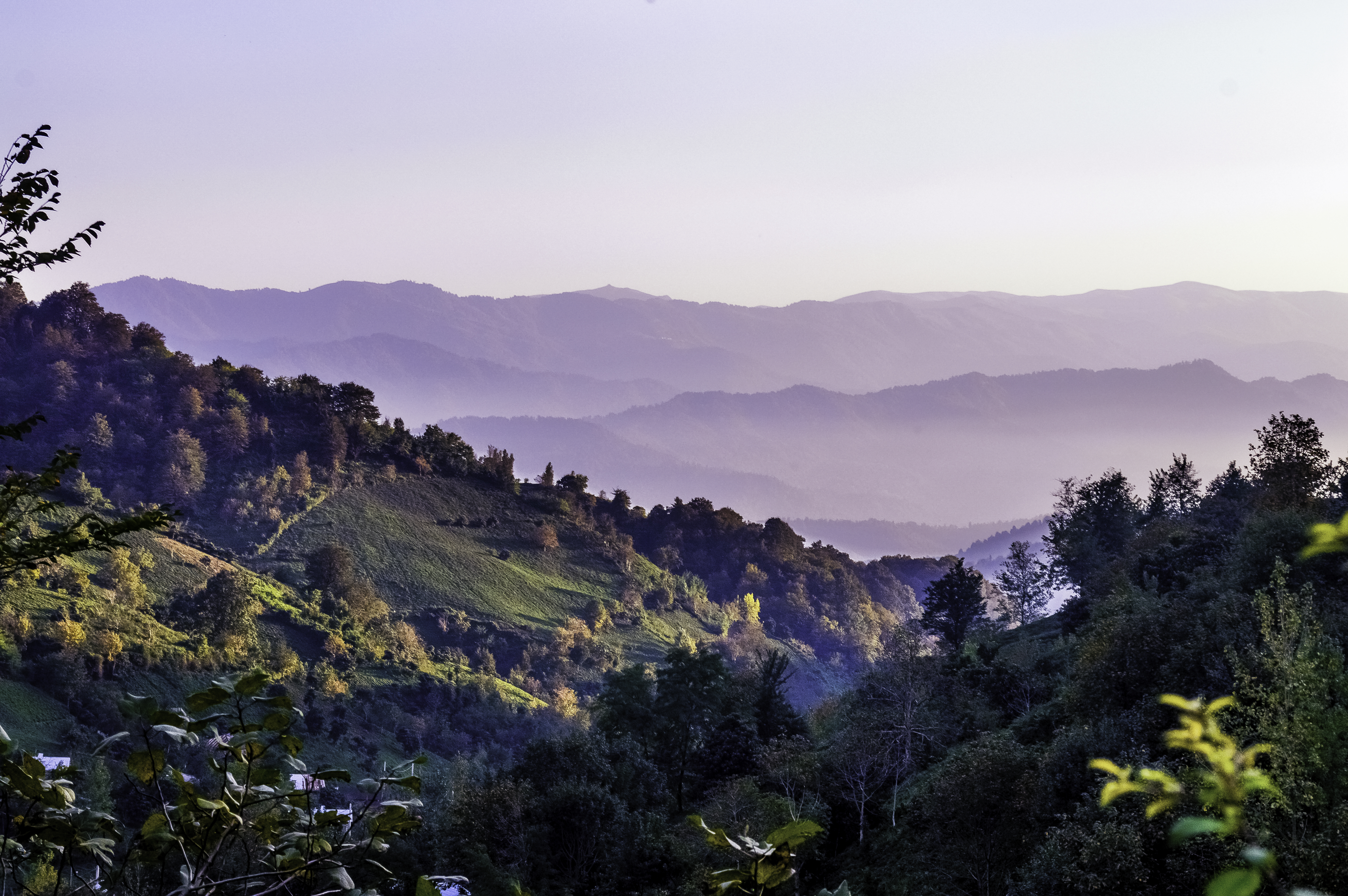
Tea plantations at the outskirt hills of Lahijan

== See also ==
Media related to Lahijan at Wikimedia Commons
