= Kashef as-Saltaneh =

Iranian diplomat and politician (1865–1929)

Kashef as-Saltaneh Mohammad Mirza Qajar Qovanlu
- محمد میرزا قاجار قوانلو
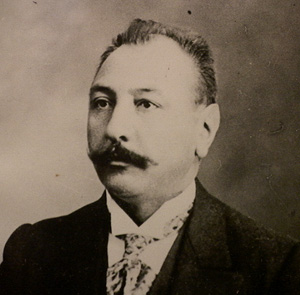
- Born: 21 March 1865; Torbat-e Heydarieh, Qajar Iran
- Died: 20 April 1929 (aged 64); Fars province, Pahlavi Iran
- Burial place: Lahijan, Iran
- Education: Sorbonne University
- Known for: Introducing tea cultivation to Iran
- Children: Three daughters and one son

Mohammad Mirza Qajar Qovanlu (Persian: محمد میرزا قاجار قوانلو; 21 March 1865 – 20 April 1929), better known by his honorary title Kashef as-Saltaneh (کاشف السلطنه), was an Iranian politician, diplomat and constitutionalist who is best known for introducing tea cultivation to Iran. He also served as the first mayor of Tehran.

== Life ==
Born on 21 March 1865, he was the oldest child of Asadallah Mirza Nayeb al-Eyaleh. His mother Jahan Ara Khanom was a granddaughter of Abbas Mirza. He attended Dar al-Fonun and learned French and other common subjects of his time. At the age of 16, he was hired by the ministry of foreign affairs and worked as secretary of Mirza Nasrullah Khan for two years. In 1881, he was sent to Paris where he studied law and jurisprudence in Sorbonne university. After getting his baccalaureate, he studied administrative law for another year. In 1889, when Naser al-Din Shah Qajar was on his third travel to Europe, he was chosen as translator to the Shah's new French physician, Jean-Baptiste Feuvrier, and returned to Iran.

=== Political activity in Iran ===
Mohammad Mirza was appointed as the governor (Nayeb al-Eyaleh) of Torbat-e Heydarieh by the governor of Khorasan, Mavid ad-dowleh. As the governor of Torbat-e Heydarieh, he advocated for a parliamentary government, which made the Shah to order his arrest. He first escaped to Nishapur, and from there moved to the Russian Empire and then the Ottoman Empire. The Shah continued searching for him and asked the Ottoman government to surrender him, which made Mohammad Mirza to escape to France, where he stayed until Naser al-Din Shah was assassinated.

=== In India ===
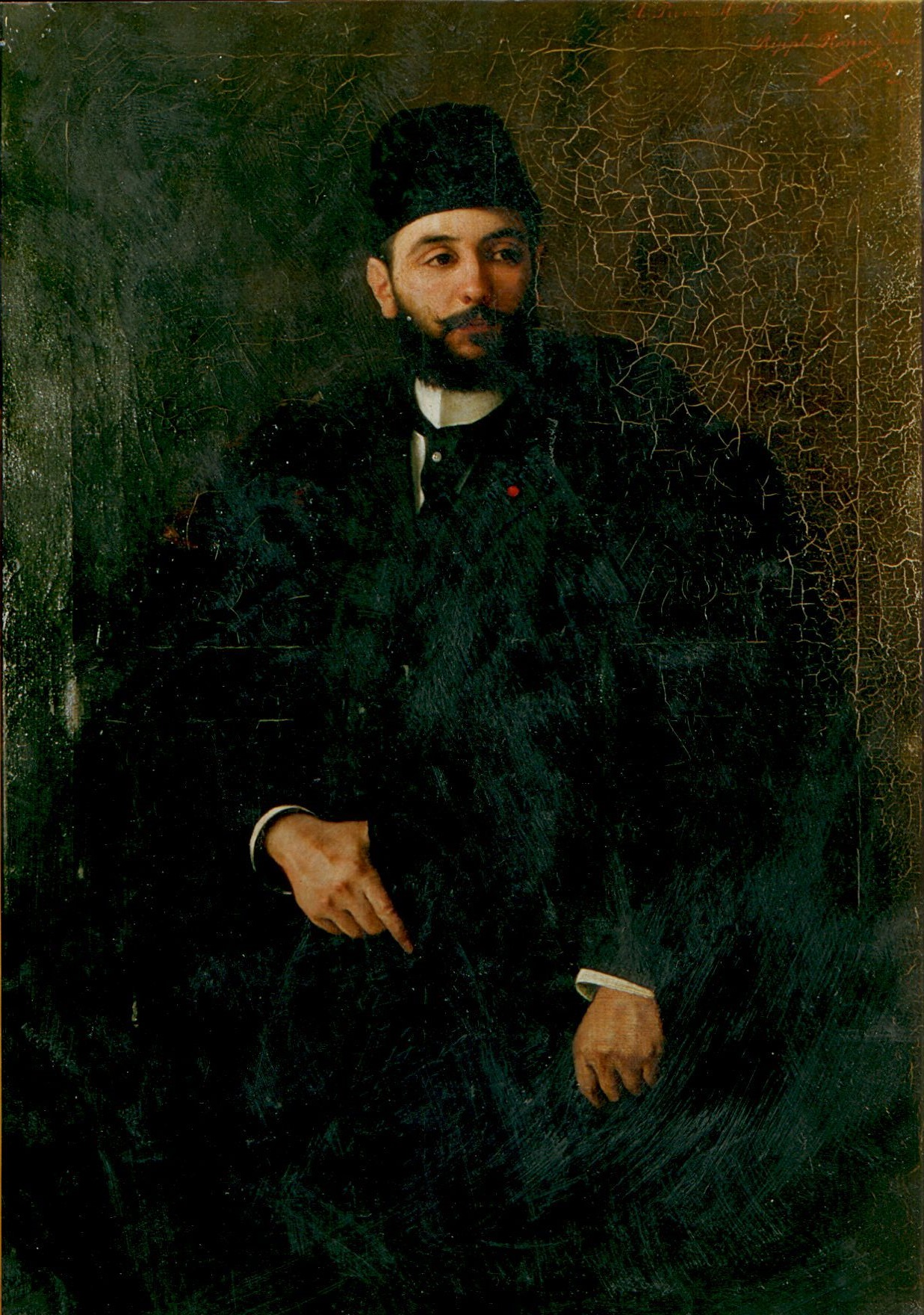
Portrait of Kashef as-Saltaneh in his youth, late 19th century

After the Shah's assassination, he was appointed as the consul general of the Iranian consulate in British India. There, he travelled to Shimla and studied tea cultivation in tea producing areas. Studying about tea was banned for citizens of non western countries however, and he had to conceal his real identity and instead claim to be a French merchant.

== Tea ==
Mohammad Mirza entered Mumbai in late 1898, and almost immediately started studying tea. At the time, around 83% of the tea consumption in Iran was imported from India worth approximately a million Tomans annually. Due to this, the Iranian government wanted to be self sufficient in tea production.

Before returning to Iran, Mohammad Mirza managed to gather some tea seeds and 4,000 saplings of tea, coffee, cinnamon, pepper, cardamom and smuggle them into Iran.

After his return, Mozaffar ad-Din Shah Qajar granted him a monopoly over production of tea. He chose two locations, Tonekabon in Mazandaran and Lahijan in Gilan, for cultivation and gradually increased his cultivated lands. By 1903, there were 300,000 tea plants in Lahijan alone.

Due to his works he was given the title "Kashef as-Saltaneh", meaning "Royal Discoverer".

== Mayor of Tehran ==
In December 1904, he was sent to France as chargé d'affaires to the Iranian embassy in France. He stayed there for more than three years and after returning he was commissioned by the recently established Iranian Parliament to found a modern municipality for Tehran. More than a year later however, he resigned.

== Death ==
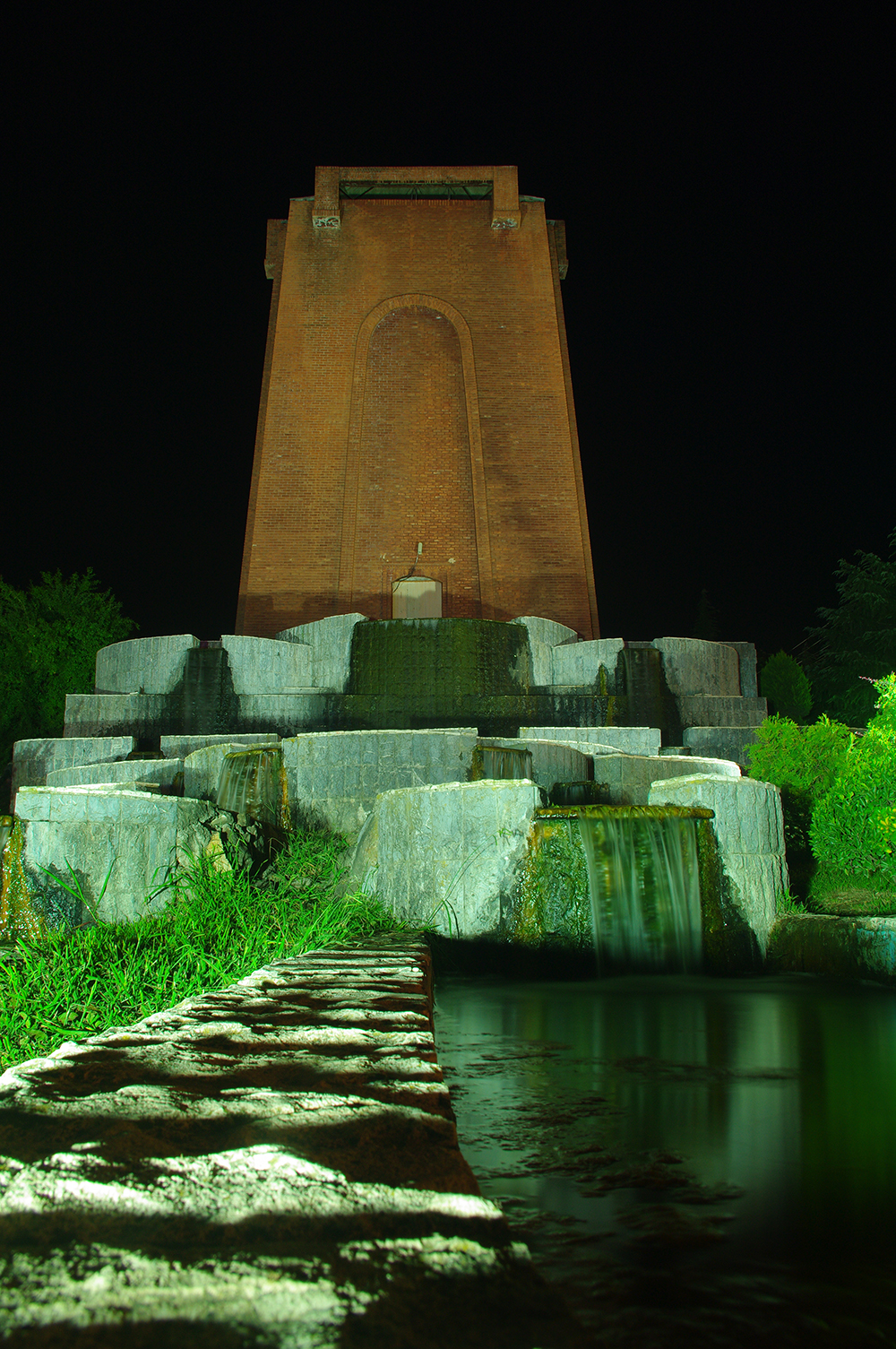
Kashef as-Saltaneh's tomb in Lahijan

After returning from a trip, he had a car accident on the road from Bushehr to Shiraz and died. He was buried in Lahijan and later a building was made on his tomb, the building is also the national museum of tea and is among the historical sights of Lahijan city.

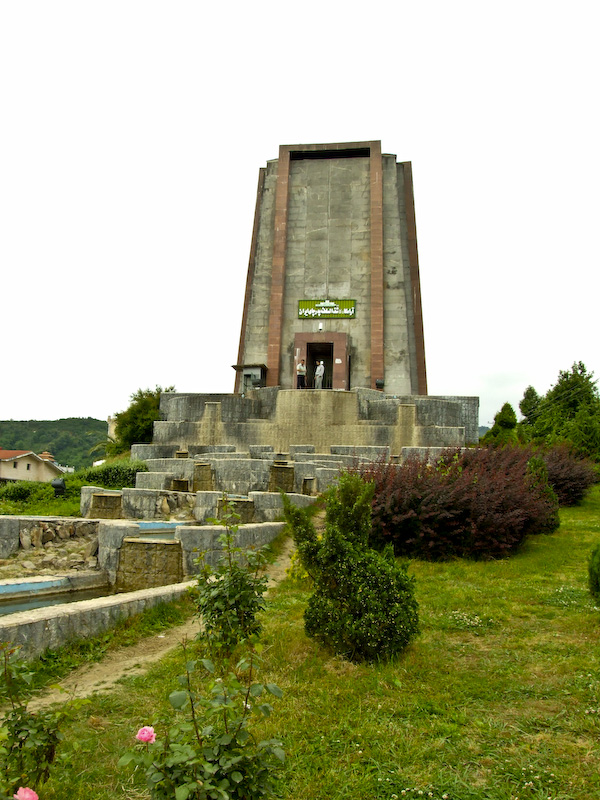
