= Shabkhus =

Shabkhus (Persian: شبخوس) may refer to:

- Shabkhus Lat
- Shabkhus Pahlu
- Shabkhus Sara
- Shabkhus Lat Rural District
