= Narakeh =

Narakeh or Narkeh (Persian: نركه) may refer to:

- Bagh Mahalleh-ye Narakeh
- Bala Mahalleh-ye Narakeh
- Pain Mahalleh-ye Narakeh
- Tazehabad-e Narakeh
