= Khomeyr Mahalleh =

Khomeyr Mahalleh (Persian: خميرمحله) may refer to:

- Khomeyr Mahalleh, Amlash
- Khomeyr Mahalleh, Langarud
- Khomeyr Mahalleh, Rudsar
- Khomeyr Mahalleh, Kelachay, Rudsar County
