= Pilam Pastanak =

Pilam Pastanak پيلام پستانك
- Village
- Country: Iran
- Province: Gilan
- County: Amlash
- Bakhsh: Central
- Rural District: Amlash-e Jonubi

Population (2006)
  - Total: 62
- Time zone: UTC+3:30 (IRST)
  - Summer (DST): UTC+4:30 (IRDT)

Pilam Pastanak (Persian: پيلام پستانك, also romanized as Pīlām Pastānak) is a village in Amlash-e Jonubi Rural District, in the Central District of Amlash County, Gilan Province, Iran. At the 2006 census, its population was 62, in 16 families.
