= Ashkar Meydan =

Ashkar Meydan اشكرميدان
- Village
- Location within Iran
- Coordinates: 37°05′43″N 50°14′29″E
- Country: Iran
- Province: Gilan
- County: Amlash
- Bakhsh: Central
- Rural District: Amlash-e Shomali

Population (2006)
  - Total: 219
- Time zone: UTC+3:30 (IRST)
  - Summer (DST): UTC+4:30 (IRDT)

Ashkar Meydan (Persian: اشكرميدان, also Romanized as Ashkar Meydān) is a village in Amlash-e Shomali Rural District, in the Central District of Amlash County, Gilan Province, Iran. At the 2006 census, its population was 219, in 69 families.
