= Tusheh Mian =

Tusheh Mian توشه ميان
- Village
- Location within Iran
- Coordinates: 37°04′12″N 50°09′51″E
- Country: Iran
- Province: Gilan
- County: Amlash
- Bakhsh: Central
- Rural District: Amlash-e Jonubi

Population (2006)
  - Total: 118
- Time zone: UTC+3:30 (IRST)
  - Summer (DST): UTC+4:30 (IRDT)

Tusheh Mian (Persian: توشه ميان, also Romanized as Tūsheh Mīān; also known as Tūshmīyān) is a village in Amlash-e Jonubi Rural District, in the Central District of Amlash County, Gilan Province, Iran. At the 2006 census, its population was 118, in 30 families.
