= Karkhaneh-ye Raisiyan =

Karkhaneh-ye Raisiyan كارخانه رئيسيان
- Village
- Country: Iran
- Province: Gilan
- County: Amlash
- Bakhsh: Central
- Rural District: Amlash-e Shomali

Population (2006)
  - Total: 46
- Time zone: UTC+3:30 (IRST)
  - Summer (DST): UTC+4:30 (IRDT)

Karkhaneh-ye Raisiyan (Persian: كارخانه رئيسيان, also Romanized as Kārkhāneh-ye Ra’īsīyān) is a village in Amlash-e Shomali Rural District, in the Central District of Amlash County, Gilan Province, Iran. At the 2006 census, its population was 46, in 13 families.
