= Siah Marz-e Gavabar =

Siah Marz-e Gavabar سياه مرزگوابر
- Village
- Location within Iran
- Coordinates: 37°04′08″N 50°11′20″E
- Country: Iran
- Province: Gilan
- County: Amlash
- Bakhsh: Central
- Rural District: Amlash-e Jonubi

Population (2006)
  - Total: 81
- Time zone: UTC+3:30 (IRST)
  - Summer (DST): UTC+4:30 (IRDT)

Siah Marz-e Gavabar (Persian: سياه مرزگوابر, also Romanized as Sīāh Marz-e Gavābar) is a village in Amlash-e Jonubi Rural District, in the Central District of Amlash County, Gilan Province, Iran. At the 2006 census, its population was 81, in 24 families.
