= Lar Dasar =

Lar Dasar لرداسر
- Village
- Interactive map of Lar Dasar
- Coordinates: 37.044°N 50.242°E
- Country: Iran
- Province: Gilan
- County: Amlash
- Bakhsh: Rankuh
- Rural District: Shabkhus Lat

Population (2016)
  - Total: 56
- Time zone: UTC+3:30 (IRST)

Lar Dasar (Persian: لرداسر, also Romanized as Lar Dāsar) is a village in Shabkhus Lat Rural District, Rankuh District, Amlash County, Gilan Province, Iran. It is an eastern suburb of Rankuh city.

At the time of the 2006 National Census, the village's population was 74 in 27 households. The following census in 2011 counted 65 people in 25 households. The 2016 census measured the population of the village as 56 people in 23 households.
