= Lat Mahalleh =

Lat Mahalleh (Persian: لات محله) may refer to:

- Lat Mahalleh, Gilan
- Lat Mahalleh, Amlash, Gilan Province
- Lat Mahalleh, Mazandaran
