= Asiab-e Saran =

Asiab-e Saran آسيابسران
- Village
- Interactive map of Asiab-e Saran
- Coordinates: 37.068°N 50.246°E
- Country: Iran
- Province: Gilan
- County: Amlash
- Bakhsh: Rankuh
- Rural District: Shabkhus Lat

Population (2016)
  - Total: 73
- Time zone: UTC+3:30 (IRST)

Asiab-e Saran (Persian: آسيابسران, also Romanized as Āsīāb-e Sarān) is a village in Shabkhus Lat Rural District, Rankuh District, Amlash County, Gilan Province, Iran. It is a northern suburb of Rankuh city.

At the time of the 2006 National Census, the village's population was 710 in 204 households. The following census in 2011 counted 58 people in 22 households. The 2016 census measured the population of the village as 73 people in 28 households.
