= Kalan Sara =

Kalan Sara كلانسرا
- Village
- Location within Iran
- Coordinates: 36°59′13″N 50°06′29″E
- Country: Iran
- Province: Gilan
- County: Amlash
- Bakhsh: Central
- Rural District: Amlash-e Jonubi

Population (2006)
  - Total: 180
- Time zone: UTC+3:30 (IRST)
  - Summer (DST): UTC+4:30 (IRDT)

Kalan Sara (Persian: كلانسرا, also Romanized as Kalān Sarā; also known as Kaland Sarā) is a village in Amlash-e Jonubi Rural District, in the Central District of Amlash County, Gilan Province, Iran. At the 2006 census, its population was 180, in 43 families.
