= Eshkiyet =

Eshkiyet اشكيت
- Village
- Location within Iran
- Coordinates: 37°07′44″N 50°12′29″E
- Country: Iran
- Province: Gilan
- County: Amlash
- Bakhsh: Central
- Rural District: Amlash-e Shomali

Population (2006)
  - Total: 115
- Time zone: UTC+3:30 (IRST)
  - Summer (DST): UTC+4:30 (IRDT)

Eshkiyet (Persian: اشكيت, also Romanized as Eshkīyet) is a village in Amlash-e Shomali Rural District, in the Central District of Amlash County, Gilan Province, Iran. At the 2006 census, its population was 115, in 35 families.
