= Darzi Gavabar =

Darzi Gavabar درزيگوابر
- Village
- Location within Iran
- Coordinates: 37°03′22″N 50°13′38″E
- Country: Iran
- Province: Gilan
- County: Amlash
- Bakhsh: Central
- Rural District: Amlash-e Jonubi

Population (2006)
  - Total: 181
- Time zone: UTC+3:30 (IRST)
  - Summer (DST): UTC+4:30 (IRDT)

Darzi Gavabar (Persian: درزيگوابر, also Romanized as Darzī Gavābar and Darzī Govābar) is a village in Amlash-e Jonubi Rural District, in the Central District of Amlash County, Gilan Province, Iran. At the 2006 census, its population was 181, in 42 families.
