= Piljeh =

Piljeh پيلجه
- Village
- Location within Iran
- Coordinates: 37°02′50″N 50°09′48″E
- Country: Iran
- Province: Gilan
- County: Amlash
- Bakhsh: Central
- Rural District: Amlash-e Jonubi

Population (2006)
  - Total: 310
- Time zone: UTC+3:30 (IRST)
  - Summer (DST): UTC+4:30 (IRDT)

Piljeh (Persian: پيلجه, also Romanized as Pīljeh; also known as Jūrpīlī Jān and Pīljān) is a village in Amlash-e Jonubi Rural District, in the Central District of Amlash County, Gilan Province, Iran. At the 2006 census, its population was 310, in 72 families.
