= Pileh Bagh =

Pileh Bagh پيله باغ
- Village
- Location within Iran
- Coordinates: 37°07′07″N 50°14′26″E
- Country: Iran
- Province: Gilan
- County: Amlash
- Bakhsh: Central
- Rural District: Amlash-e Shomali

Population (2006)
  - Total: 82
- Time zone: UTC+3:30 (IRST)
  - Summer (DST): UTC+4:30 (IRDT)

Pileh Bagh (Persian: پيله باغ, also Romanized as Pīleh Bāgh) is a village in Amlash-e Shomali Rural District, in the Central District of Amlash County, Gilan Province, Iran. At the 2006 census, its population was 82, in 25 families.
