= Kalayeh =

Kalayeh (Persian: كلايه) may refer to:

- Kalayeh, Rudbar, Gilan province
- Kia Kalayeh, a village in Gilan province
- Lasku Kalayeh, a village in Gilan province
- Musa Kalayeh, a village in Gilan province
- Kalayeh, Mazandaran
- Kalayeh, Abyek, Qazvin province
- Kalayeh, Alamut-e Gharbi, Qazvin province
- Kalayeh, Rudbar-e Alamut, Qazvin province
