= Aftab Khvortab =

Aftab Khvortab افتابخورتاب
- Village
- Location within Iran
- Coordinates: 37°03′48″N 50°10′53″E
- Country: Iran
- Province: Gilan
- County: Amlash
- Bakhsh: Central
- Rural District: Amlash-e Jonubi

Population (2006)
  - Total: 44
- Time zone: UTC+3:30 (IRST)
  - Summer (DST): UTC+4:30 (IRDT)

Aftab Khvortab (Persian: افتابخورتاب, also Romanized as Āftāb Khvortāb; also known as Āftāb Khowrdeh) is a village in Amlash-e Jonubi Rural District, in the Central District of Amlash County, Gilan Province, Iran. At the 2006 census, its population was 44, in 14 families.
