= Gudi Gavabar =

Gudi Gavabar گودي گوابر
- Village
- Country: Iran
- Province: Gilan
- County: Amlash
- Bakhsh: Central
- Rural District: Amlash-e Jonubi

Population (2006)
  - Total: 11
- Time zone: UTC+3:30 (IRST)
  - Summer (DST): UTC+4:30 (IRDT)

Gudi Gavabar (Persian: گودي گوابر, also Romanized as Gūdī Gavābar) is a village in Amlash-e Jonubi Rural District, in the Central District of Amlash County, Gilan Province, Iran. At the 2006 census, its population was 11, in 5 families.
