= Tahmas Gavabar =

Tahmas Gavabar طهماسگوابر
- Village
- Location within Iran
- Coordinates: 37°03′50″N 50°09′38″E
- Country: Iran
- Province: Gilan
- County: Amlash
- Bakhsh: Central
- Rural District: Amlash-e Jonubi

Population (2006)
  - Total: 69
- Time zone: UTC+3:30 (IRST)
  - Summer (DST): UTC+4:30 (IRDT)

Tahmas Gavabar (Persian: طهماسگوابر, also Romanized as Ţahmās Gavābar; also known as Tamās Gavābar) is a village in Amlash-e Jonubi Rural District, in the Central District of Amlash County, Gilan Province, Iran. At the 2006 census, its population was 69, in 23 families.
