= Gudun Gavabar =

Gudun Gavabar گودين گوابر
- Village
- Location within Iran
- Coordinates: 37°05′02″N 50°10′33″E
- Country: Iran
- Province: Gilan
- County: Amlash
- Bakhsh: Central
- Rural District: Amlash-e Jonubi

Population (2006)
  - Total: 95
- Time zone: UTC+3:30 (IRST)
  - Summer (DST): UTC+4:30 (IRDT)

Gudun Gavabar (Persian: گودين گوابر, also Romanized as Gūdūn Gavābar; also known as Godūn Gavābar) is a village in Amlash-e Jonubi Rural District, in the Central District of Amlash County, Gilan Province, Iran. At the 2006 census, its population was 95, in 31 families.
