= Asak =

Asak may refer to:

Iran
Asak (Persian: اسك) may refer to one of several places:

- Asak, Gilan
- Asak, Hirmand, Sistan and Baluchestan Province
- Asak, Qorqori, Hirmand County, Sistan and Baluchestan Province

North Africa

- Asak (Tuareg), traditional songs of the Tuareg people

Norway

- Asak (Norway), a village in Østfold
