= Pil Darreh =

Pil Darreh پيلدره
- Village
- Location within Iran
- Coordinates: 37°03′32″N 50°11′24″E
- Country: Iran
- Province: Gilan
- County: Amlash
- Bakhsh: Central
- Rural District: Amlash-e Jonubi

Population (2006)
  - Total: 313
- Time zone: UTC+3:30 (IRST)
  - Summer (DST): UTC+4:30 (IRDT)

Pil Darreh (Persian: پيلدره, also Romanized as Pīl Darreh; also known as Pīlidarreh) is a village in Amlash-e Jonubi Rural District, in the Central District of Amlash County, Gilan Province, Iran. At the 2006 census, its population was 313, in 77 families.
