= Shekarkash Mahalleh =

Shekarkash Mahalleh شكركش محله
- Village
- Location within Iran
- Coordinates: 37°05′43″N 50°15′27″E
- Country: Iran
- Province: Gilan
- County: Amlash
- Bakhsh: Central
- Rural District: Amlash-e Shomali

Population (2006)
  - Total: 80
- Time zone: UTC+3:30 (IRST)
  - Summer (DST): UTC+4:30 (IRDT)

Shekarkash Mahalleh (Persian: شكركش محله, also Romanized as Shekarkash Maḩalleh) is a village in Amlash-e Shomali Rural District, in the Central District of Amlash County, Gilan Province, Iran. At the 2006 census, its population was 80, in 28 families.
