= Jowrka Sar =

Village in Gilan, Iran

Jowrka Sar جوركاسر
- Village
- Location within Iran
- Coordinates: 37°04′11″N 50°11′24″E
- Country: Iran
- Province: Gilan
- County: Amlash
- Bakhsh: Central
- Rural District: Amlash-e Jonubi

Population (2006)
  - Total: 386
- Time zone: UTC+3:30 (IRST)
  - Summer (DST): UTC+4:30 (IRDT)

Jowrka Sar (Persian: جوركاسر, also Romanized as Jowrkā Sar; also known as Jorkā Sar) is a village in Amlash-e Jonubi Rural District, in the Central District of Amlash County, Gilan Province, Iran. At the 2006 census, its population was 386, in 101 families.
