= Shekarpas =

Shekarpas شكرپس
- Village
- Location within Iran
- Coordinates: 37°06′09″N 50°13′58″E
- Country: Iran
- Province: Gilan
- County: Amlash
- Bakhsh: Central
- Rural District: Amlash-e Shomali

Population (2006)
  - Total: 139
- Time zone: UTC+3:30 (IRST)
  - Summer (DST): UTC+4:30 (IRDT)

Shekarpas (Persian: شكرپس) is a village in Amlash-e Shomali Rural District, in the Central District of Amlash County, Gilan Province, Iran. At the 2006 census, its population was 139, in 45 families.
