= Sukhteh Kish =

Village in Gilan province, Iran

Sukhteh Kish Persian: سوخته كيش
- Village
- Location within Iran
- Coordinates: 37°03′00″N 50°15′02″E
- Country: Iran
- Province: Gilan
- County: Amlash
- District: Rankuh

Population (2016)
  - Total: 381
- Time zone: UTC+3:30 (IRST)

Sukhteh Kish (Persian: سوخته كيش) (Note: Also romanized as Sūkhteh Kīsh; also known as Sūkhteh Kesh) is a village in Shabkhus Lat Rural District (Note: Formerly Amlash-e Jonubi Rural District) of Rankuh District in Amlash County, Gilan province, Iran.

== Demographics ==
=== Population ===
At the time of the 2006 National Census, the village's population was 441 in 119 households. The following census in 2011 counted 408 people in 133 households. The 2016 census measured the population of the village as 381 people in 132 households.
