= Aliabad, Amlash =

Aliabad علی آباد
- Village
- Location within Iran
- Coordinates: 37°04′05″N 50°13′20″E
- Country: Iran
- Province: Gilan
- County: Amlash
- Bakhsh: Rankuh
- Rural District: Shabkhus Lat

Population (2016)
  - Total: 246
- Time zone: UTC+3:30 (IRST)

Aliabad (Persian: علی آباد, also Romanized as ‘Alīābād; also known as ‘Alīābād-e Rameshāyeh) is a village in Shabkhus Lat Rural District, Rankuh District, Amlash County, Gilan Province, Iran.

At the time of the 2006 National Census, the village's population was 198 in 50 households. The following census in 2011 counted 226 people in 63 households. The 2016 census measured the population of the village as 246 people in 81 households.
