= Malja Dasht =

Village in Gilan province, Iran

Malja Dasht Persian: ملجادشت
- Village
- Location within Iran
- Coordinates: 36°52′36″N 50°07′10″E
- Country: Iran
- Province: Gilan
- County: Amlash
- District: Rankuh
- Rural District: Kojid

Population (2016)
  - Total: 25
- Time zone: UTC+3:30 (IRST)

Malja Dasht (Persian: ملجادشت) (Note: Also romanized as Maljā Dasht; also known as Marjā Dasht) is a village in Kojid Rural District of Rankuh District in Amlash County, Gilan province, Iran.

== Demographics ==
=== Population ===
At the time of the 2006 National Census, the village's population was 38 in 15 households. The census in 2011 counted 35 people in 13 households. The 2016 census measured the population of the village as 25 people in 12 households.
