= Hajjiabad, Amlash =

Village in Gilan province, Iran

Hajjiabad Persian: حاجي اباد
- Village
- Location within Iran
- Coordinates: 37°04′59″N 50°12′02″E
- Country: Iran
- Province: Gilan
- County: Amlash
- District: Central
- Rural District: Amlash-e Jonubi

Population (2016)
  - Total: 545
- Time zone: UTC+3:30 (IRST)

Hajjiabad (Persian: حاجي اباد) (Note: Also romanized as Ḩājīābād and Ḩājjīābād) is a village in, and the capital of, Amlash-e Jonubi Rural District in the Central District of Amlash County, Gilan province, Iran.

== Demographics ==
=== Population ===
At the time of the 2006 National Census, the village's population was 452 in 129 households. The following census in 2011 counted 524 people in 173 households. The 2016 census measured the population of the village as 545 people in 192 households. It was the most populous village in its rural district.
