= Shiyeh =

Shiyeh شيه
- Village
- Location within Iran
- Coordinates: 36°53′04″N 50°01′44″E
- Country: Iran
- Province: Gilan
- County: Amlash
- Bakhsh: Rankuh
- Rural District: Somam

Population (2016)
  - Total: 12
- Time zone: UTC+3:30 (IRST)

Shiyeh (Persian: شيه, also Romanized as Shīyeh) is a village in Somam Rural District, Rankuh District, Amlash County, Gilan Province, Iran. At the 2016 census, its population was 12, in 6 families. Decreased from 66 people in 2006.
