= Alankangeh =

Village in Gilan province, Iran

Alankangeh Persian: النكنگه
- Village
- Location within Iran
- Coordinates: 36°54′08″N 50°07′52″E
- Country: Iran
- Province: Gilan
- County: Amlash
- District: Rankuh
- Rural District: Kojid

Population (2016)
  - Total: Below reporting threshold
- Time zone: UTC+3:30 (IRST)

Alankangeh (Persian: النكنگه) (Note: Also romanized as Ālankangeh) is a village in Kojid Rural District of Rankuh District in Amlash County, Gilan province, Iran.

== Demographics ==
=== Population ===
At the time of the 2006 National Census, the village's population was eight in five households. The following censuses of 2011 and 2016 counted a population below the reporting threshold.
