= Halu Sara =

Halu Sara or Holu Sara (Persian: هلوسرا) may refer to:

- Bala Holu Sara
- Pain Halu Sara
