= Motla Kuh =

Village in Gilan province, Iran

Motla Kuh Persian: مطلاكوه
- Village
- Location within Iran
- Coordinates: 36°52′40″N 50°07′44″E
- Country: Iran
- Province: Gilan
- County: Amlash
- District: Rankuh
- Rural District: Kojid

Population (2016)
  - Total: 61
- Time zone: UTC+3:30 (IRST)

Motla Kuh (Persian: مطلاكوه) (Note: Also romanized as Moţlā Kūh) is a village in Kojid Rural District of Rankuh District in Amlash County, Gilan province, Iran.

== Demographics ==
=== Population ===
At the time of the 2006 National Census, the village's population was 43 in 14 households. The census in 2011 counted 56 people in 21 households. The 2016 census measured the population of the village as 61 people in 23 households.
