= Sivir =

Village in Gilan province, Iran

Sivir Persian: سيوير
- Village
- Location within Iran
- Coordinates: 37°03′32″N 50°16′03″E
- Country: Iran
- Province: Gilan
- County: Amlash
- District: Rankuh

Population (2016)
  - Total: 337
- Time zone: UTC+3:30 (IRST)

Sivir (Persian: سيوير) (Note: Also romanized as Sīvīr) is a village in Shabkhus Lat Rural District (Note: Formerly Amlash-e Jonubi Rural District) of Rankuh District in Amlash County, Gilan province, Iran.

== Demographics ==
=== Population ===
At the time of the 2006 National Census, the village's population was 397 in 115 households. The following census in 2011 counted 380 people in 127 households. The 2016 census measured the population of the village as 337 people in 129 households.
