= Kalam Rud =

Village in Gilan province, Iran

Kalam Rud Persian: كلامرود
- Village
- Location within Iran
- Coordinates: 36°49′28″N 50°07′43″E
- Country: Iran
- Province: Gilan
- County: Amlash
- District: Rankuh
- Rural District: Somam

Population (2016)
  - Total: 172
- Time zone: UTC+3:30 (IRST)

Kalam Rud (Persian: كلامرود) (Note: Also romanized as Kalām Rūd) is a village in Somam Rural District of Rankuh District in Amlash County, Gilan province, Iran.

== Demographics ==
=== Population ===
At the time of the 2006 National Census, the village's population was 197 in 81 households. The following census in 2011 counted 155 people in 77 households. The 2016 census measured the population of the village as 172 people in 91 households.
