= Khasil-e Dasht =

Village in Gilan province, Iran

Khasil-e Dasht Persian: خصيل دشت
- Village
- Location within Iran
- Coordinates: 36°57′30″N 50°03′42″E
- Country: Iran
- Province: Gilan
- County: Amlash
- District: Rankuh
- Rural District: Kojid

Population (2016)
  - Total: 30
- Time zone: UTC+3:30 (IRST)

Khasil-e Dasht (Persian: خصيل دشت) is a village in Kojid Rural District of Rankuh District in Amlash County, Gilan province, Iran.

== Demographics ==
=== Population ===
At the time of the 2006 and 2011 National Censuses, the village's population was below the reporting threshold. The 2016 census measured the population of the village as 30 people in 15 households.
