= Taresh =

Village in Gilan province, Iran

Taresh Persian: طارش
- Village
- Location within Iran
- Coordinates: 36°52′08″N 50°08′17″E
- Country: Iran
- Province: Gilan
- County: Amlash
- District: Rankuh
- Rural District: Kojid

Population (2016)
  - Total: 44
- Time zone: UTC+3:30 (IRST)

Taresh (Persian: طارش) (Note: Also romanized as Ţāresh) is a village in Kojid Rural District of Rankuh District in Amlash County, Gilan province, Iran.

== Demographics ==
=== Population ===
At the time of the 2006 National Census, the village's population was 44 in 14 households. The census in 2011 counted 33 people in 11 households. The 2016 census measured the population of the village as 44 people in 17 households.
