= Sopordan =

Sopordan or Separdan or Sepordan (Persian: سپردان) may refer to:

- Sopordan, Amlash
- Separdan, Siahkal
