= Khomeyr Mahalleh, Amlash =

Khomeyr Mahalleh خميرمحله
- Village
- Location within Iran
- Coordinates: 37°06′07″N 50°08′16″E
- Country: Iran
- Province: Gilan
- County: Amlash
- Bakhsh: Central
- Rural District: Amlash-e Shomali

Population (2006)
  - Total: 68
- Time zone: UTC+3:30 (IRST)
  - Summer (DST): UTC+4:30 (IRDT)

Khomeyr Mahalleh (Persian: خميرمحله, also Romanized as Khomeyr Maḩalleh) is a village in Amlash-e Shomali Rural District, in the Central District of Amlash County, Gilan Province, Iran. At the 2006 census, its population was 68, in 19 families.
