= Mian Sara =

Mian Sara or Miyansara (Persian: ميانسرا) may refer to:

- Mian Sara, Gilan
- Mian Sara, Mazandaran
- Mian Sara, Razavi Khorasan
