= Chalaras =

Village in Gilan province, Iran

Chalaras Persian: چلارس
- Village
- Location within Iran
- Coordinates: 37°06′15″N 50°11′56″E
- Country: Iran
- Province: Gilan
- County: Amlash
- District: Central
- Rural District: Amlash-e Shomali

Population (2016)
  - Total: 344
- Time zone: UTC+3:30 (IRST)

Chalaras (Persian: چلارس) (Note: Also romanized as Chalāras; also known as Chalāras-e Bālā) is a village in Amlash-e Shomali Rural District of the Central District in Amlash County, Gilan province, Iran.

== Demographics ==
=== Population ===
At the time of the 2006 National Census, the village's population was 414 in 111 households. The following census in 2011 counted 366 people in 112 households. The 2016 census measured the population of the village as 344 people in 114 households.
