= Lakmuj =

Village in Gilan province, Iran

Lakmuj Persian: لكموج
- Village
- Location within Iran
- Coordinates: 37°06′07″N 50°13′21″E
- Country: Iran
- Province: Gilan
- County: Amlash
- District: Central
- Rural District: Amlash-e Shomali

Population (2016)
  - Total: 393
- Time zone: UTC+3:30 (IRST)

Lakmuj (Persian: لكموج) (Note: Also romanized as Lakmūj; also known as Lagmūj) is a village in Amlash-e Shomali Rural District of the Central District in Amlash County, Gilan province, Iran.

== Demographics ==
=== Population ===
At the time of the 2006 National Census, the village's population was 336 in 106 households. The following census in 2011 counted 571 people in 124 households. The 2016 census measured the population of the village as 393 people in 111 households.
