= Goshkur =

Goshkur گشكور
- Village
- Location within Iran
- Coordinates: 37°01′25″N 50°12′24″E
- Country: Iran
- Province: Gilan
- County: Amlash
- Bakhsh: Rankuh
- Rural District: Shabkhus Lat

Population (2016)
  - Total: 181
- Time zone: UTC+3:30 (IRST)

Goshkur (Persian: گشكور, also Romanized as Goshkūr) is a village in Shabkhus Lat Rural District, Rankuh District, Amlash County, Gilan Province, Iran.

At the time of the 2006 National Census, the village's population was 297 in 82 households. The following census in 2011 counted 264 people in 84 households. The 2016 census measured the population of the village as 181 people in 68 households.
