= Kash Kalayeh =

Village in Gilan province, Iran

Kash Kalayeh Persian: كشكلايه
- Village
- Location within Iran
- Coordinates: 37°03′49″N 50°12′48″E
- Country: Iran
- Province: Gilan
- County: Amlash
- District: Central
- Rural District: Amlash-e Jonubi

Population (2016)
  - Total: 222
- Time zone: UTC+3:30 (IRST)

Kash Kalayeh (Persian: كشكلايه) (Note: Also romanized as Kash Kalāyeh) is a village in Amlash-e Jonubi Rural District of the Central District in Amlash County, Gilan province, Iran.

== Demographics ==
=== Population ===
At the time of the 2006 National Census, the village's population was 277 in 83 households. The following census in 2011 counted 257 people in 83 households. The 2016 census measured the population of the village as 222 people in 82 households.
