= Kharashtom =

Village in Gilan province, Iran

Kharashtom Persian: خرشتم
- Village
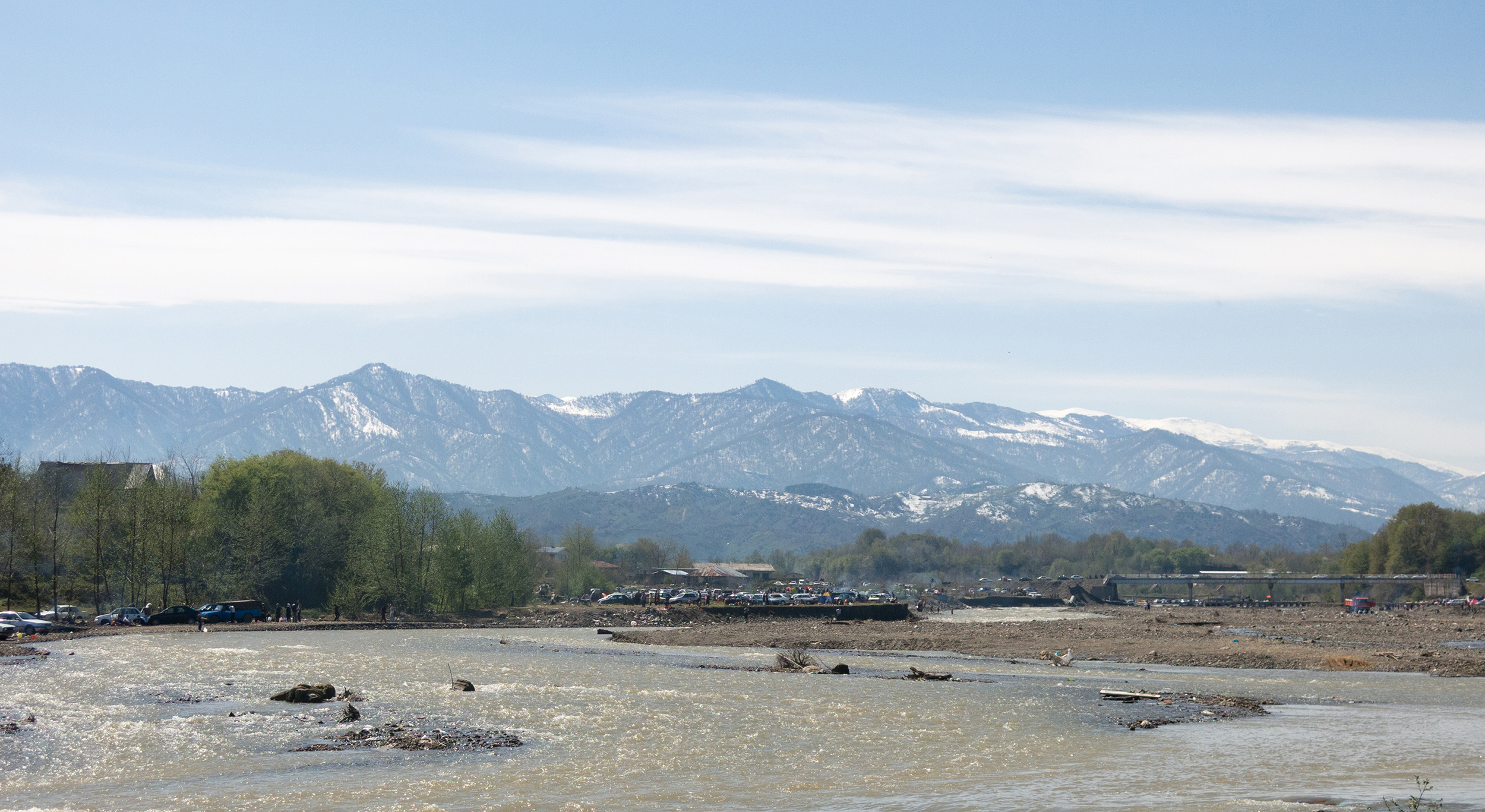
- The village of Kharashtom

- Location within Iran
- Coordinates: 37°07′11″N 50°11′26″E
- Country: Iran
- Province: Gilan
- County: Amlash
- District: Central
- Rural District: Amlash-e Shomali

Population (2016)
  - Total: 474
- Time zone: UTC+3:30 (IRST)

Kharashtom (Persian: خرشتم) (Note: Also romanized as Khareshtom) is a village in Amlash-e Shomali Rural District of the Central District in Amlash County, Gilan province, Iran.

== Demographics ==
=== Population ===
At the time of the 2006 National Census, the village's population was 626 in 205 households. The following census in 2011 counted 571 people in 204 households. The 2016 census measured the population of the village as 474 people in 182 households.
