= Shisharestan =

Village in Gilan province, Iran

Shisharestan Persian: شي شارستان
- Village
- Location within Iran
- Coordinates: 37°03′08″N 50°10′21″E
- Country: Iran
- Province: Gilan
- County: Amlash
- District: Central
- Rural District: Amlash-e Jonubi

Population (2016)
  - Total: 423
- Time zone: UTC+3:30 (IRST)

Shisharestan (Persian: شي شارستان) (Note: Also romanized as Shīshārestān; also known as Shesh Ārestān) is a village in Amlash-e Jonubi Rural District of the Central District in Amlash County, Gilan province, Iran.

== Demographics ==
=== Population ===
At the time of the 2006 National Census, the village's population was 619 in 174 households. The following census in 2011 counted 536 people in 176 households. The 2016 census measured the population of the village as 423 people in 166 households.
