= Sar Tarbat =

Village in Gilan province, Iran

Sar Tarbat Persian: سرتربت
- Village
- Location within Iran
- Coordinates: 36°54′51″N 50°06′18″E
- Country: Iran
- Province: Gilan
- County: Amlash
- District: Rankuh
- Rural District: Kojid

Population (2016)
  - Total: Below reporting threshold
- Time zone: UTC+3:30 (IRST)

Sar Tarbat (Persian: سرتربت) is a village in Kojid Rural District of Rankuh District in Amlash County, Gilan province, Iran.

== Demographics ==
=== Population ===
At the time of the 2006 National Census, the village's population was 15 in five households. The census in 2011 counted 12 people in five households. The 2016 census measured the population of the village as below the reporting threshold.
