= Mashkaleh =

Village in Gilan province, Iran

Mashkaleh Persian: مشكله
- Village
- Location within Iran
- Coordinates: 37°06′51″N 50°12′21″E
- Country: Iran
- Province: Gilan
- County: Amlash
- District: Central
- Rural District: Amlash-e Shomali

Population (2016)
  - Total: 483
- Time zone: UTC+3:30 (IRST)

Mashkaleh (Persian: مشكله) (Note: Also known as Mashgaleh) is a village in Amlash-e Shomali Rural District of the Central District in Amlash County, Gilan province, Iran.

== Demographics ==
=== Population ===
At the time of the 2006 National Census, the village's population was 555 in 161 households. The following census in 2011 counted 526 people in 178 households. The 2016 census measured the population of the village as 483 people in 179 households.
