= Surkuh =

Village in Gilan province, Iran

Surkuh Persian: سوركوه
- Village
- Location within Iran
- Coordinates: 37°07′25″N 50°13′31″E
- Country: Iran
- Province: Gilan
- County: Amlash
- District: Central
- Rural District: Amlash-e Shomali

Population (2016)
  - Total: 652
- Time zone: UTC+3:30 (IRST)

Surkuh (Persian: سوركوه) (Note: Also romanized as Sūrkūh) is a village in Amlash-e Shomali Rural District of the Central District in Amlash County, Gilan province, Iran.

== Demographics ==
=== Population ===
At the time of the 2006 National Census, the village's population was 799 in 234 households. The following census in 2011 counted 735 people in 244 households. The 2016 census measured the population of the village as 652 people in 235 households.
