= Babajan Darreh =

Village in Gilan province, Iran

Babajan Darreh Persian: باباجان دره
- Village
- Location within Iran
- Coordinates: 36°55′18″N 50°05′34″E
- Country: Iran
- Province: Gilan
- County: Amlash
- District: Rankuh
- Rural District: Kojid

Population (2016)
  - Total: 12
- Time zone: UTC+3:30 (IRST)

Babajan Darreh (Persian: باباجان دره) (Note: Also romanized as Bābājān Darreh) is a village in Kojid Rural District of Rankuh District in Amlash County, Gilan province, Iran.

== Demographics ==
=== Population ===
At the time of the 2006 National Census, the village's population was 13 in four households. The census in 2011 counted 15 people in five households. The 2016 census measured the population of the village as 12 people in five households.
