= Beheshtabad, Gilan =

Beheshtabad بهشت آباد
- Village
- Location within Iran
- Coordinates: 37°03′53″N 50°14′56″E
- Country: Iran
- Province: Gilan
- County: Amlash
- Bakhsh: Rankuh
- Rural District: Shabkhus Lat

Population (2016)
  - Total: 65
- Time zone: UTC+3:30 (IRST)

Beheshtabad (Persian: بهشت آباد, also Romanized as Beheshtābād) is a village in Shabkhus Lat Rural District, Rankuh District, Amlash County, Gilan Province, Iran.

At the time of the 2006 National Census, the village's population was 64 in 21 households. The following census in 2011 counted 62 people in 22 households. The 2016 census measured the population of the village as 65 people in 26 households.
