= Kakrud, Amlash =

Kakrud كاكرود
- Village
- Location within Iran
- Coordinates: 36°53′00″N 50°05′08″E
- Country: Iran
- Province: Gilan
- County: Amlash
- Bakhsh: Rankuh
- Rural District: Somam

Population (2016)
  - Total: 97
- Time zone: UTC+3:30 (IRST)

Kakrud (Persian: كاكرود, also Romanized as Kākrūd) is a village in Somam Rural District, Rankuh District, Amlash County, Gilan Province, Iran. At the 2016 census, its population was 97, in 36 families.
