= Rud Gavaber =

Rud Gavaber رودگوابر
- Village
- Location within Iran
- Coordinates: 37°01′00″N 50°13′43″E
- Country: Iran
- Province: Gilan
- County: Amlash
- Bakhsh: Rankuh
- Rural District: Shabkhus Lat

Population (2016)
  - Total: 111
- Time zone: UTC+3:30 (IRST)

Rud Gavaber (Persian: رودگوابر, also Romanized as Rūd Gavāber and Rūd-e Gavāber; also known as Rūd-e Gavāpar) is a village in Shabkhus Lat Rural District, Rankuh District, Amlash County, Gilan Province, Iran.

At the time of the 2006 National Census, the village's population was 132 in 31 households. The following census in 2011 counted 123 people in 36 households. The 2016 census measured the population of the village as 111 people in 37 households.
