= Zahun Bareh =

Zahun Bareh زهون بره
- Village
- Interactive map of Zahun Bareh
- Coordinates: 36°49′49.71″N 50°7′4.28″E
- Country: Iran
- Province: Gilan
- County: Amlash
- Bakhsh: Rankuh
- Rural District: Somam

Population (2016)
  - Total: 21
- Time zone: UTC+3:30 (IRST)

Zahun Bareh (Persian: زهون بره, also Romanized as Zahūn Bareh) is a village in Somam Rural District, Rankuh District, Amlash County, Gilan Province, Iran. At the 2016 census, its population was 21, in 7 families. Down from 28 in 2006.
