= Shabkhus Pahlu =

Shabkhus Pahlu شبخوس پهلو
- Village
- Location within Iran
- Coordinates: 37°04′35″N 50°09′18″E
- Country: Iran
- Province: Gilan
- County: Amlash
- Bakhsh: Central
- Rural District: Amlash-e Jonubi

Population (2006)
  - Total: 213
- Time zone: UTC+3:30 (IRST)
  - Summer (DST): UTC+4:30 (IRDT)

Shabkhus Pahlu (Persian: شبخوس پهلو, also Romanized as Shabkhūs Pahlū) is a village in Amlash-e Jonubi Rural District, in the Central District of Amlash County, Gilan Province, Iran. At the 2006 census, its population was 213, in 56 families.
