= Siah Khulak =

Village in Gilan province, Iran

Siah Khulak Persian: سياه خلك
- Village
- Location within Iran
- Coordinates: 36°52′10″N 50°05′46″E
- Country: Iran
- Province: Gilan
- County: Amlash
- District: Rankuh
- Rural District: Somam

Population (2016)
  - Total: 153
- Time zone: UTC+3:30 (IRST)

Siah Khulak (Persian: سياه خولك) (Note: Also romanized as Sīāh Khūlak; also known as Sīāh Khalak) is a village in Somam Rural District of Rankuh District in Amlash County, Gilan province, Iran.

== Demographics ==
=== Population ===
At the time of the 2006 National Census, the village's population was 149 in 44 households. The following census in 2011 counted 172 people in 64 households. The 2016 census measured the population of the village as 153 people in 59 households.
