= Jowr Gavaber, Amlash =

Village in Gilan province, Iran

Jowr Gavaber Persian: جورگوابر
- Village
- Location within Iran
- Coordinates: 37°02′24″N 50°11′51″E
- Country: Iran
- Province: Gilan
- County: Amlash
- District: Rankuh

Population (2016)
  - Total: 384
- Time zone: UTC+3:30 (IRST)

Jowr Gavaber (Persian: جورگوابر) (Note: Also romanized as Jowr Gavāber and Jowrgavāber) is a village in Shabkhus Lat Rural District (Note: Formerly Amlash-e Jonubi Rural District) of Rankuh District in Amlash County, Gilan province, Iran.

== Demographics ==
=== Population ===
At the time of the 2006 National Census, the village's population was 501 in 140 households. The following census in 2011 counted 417 people in 137 households. The 2016 census measured the population of the village as 384 people in 152 households.
