= Garkarud =

Village in Gilan province, Iran

Garkarud Persian: گركرود
- Village
- Location within Iran
- Coordinates: 37°01′41″N 50°13′53″E
- Country: Iran
- Province: Gilan
- County: Amlash
- District: Rankuh

Population (2016)
  - Total: 1,443
- Time zone: UTC+3:30 (IRST)

Garkarud (Persian: گركرود) (Note: Also romanized as Garkarūd, Garkorūd, and Garkrūd; also known as Garkūrūd) is a village in Shabkhus Lat Rural District (Note: Formerly Amlash-e Jonubi Rural District) of Rankuh District in Amlash County, Gilan province, Iran.

== Demographics ==
=== Population ===
At the time of the 2006 National Census, the village's population was 1,519 in 409 households. The following census in 2011 counted 1,589 people in 474 households. The 2016 census measured the population of the village as 1,443 people in 508 households. It was the most populous village in its rural district.
