= Varkureh =

Village in Gilan province, Iran

Varkureh Persian: وركوره
- Village
- Location within Iran
- Coordinates: 37°01′14″N 50°13′19″E
- Country: Iran
- Province: Gilan
- County: Amlash
- District: Rankuh

Population (2016)
  - Total: 302
- Time zone: UTC+3:30 (IRST)

Varkureh (Persian: وركوره) (Note: Also romanized as Varkūreh; also known as Varkūrā) is a village in Shabkhus Lat Rural District (Note: Formerly Amlash-e Jonubi Rural District) of Rankuh District in Amlash County, Gilan province, Iran.

== Demographics ==
=== Population ===
At the time of the 2006 National Census, the village's population was 370 in 109 households. The following census in 2011 counted 333 people in 107 households. The 2016 census measured the population of the village as 302 people in 108 households.
