= Halu Chak =

Village in Gilan province, Iran

Halu Chak Persian: هلوچاك
- Village
- Location within Iran
- Coordinates: 36°55′05″N 50°06′57″E
- Country: Iran
- Province: Gilan
- County: Amlash
- District: Rankuh
- Rural District: Kojid

Population (2016)
  - Total: Below reporting threshold
- Time zone: UTC+3:30 (IRST)

Halu Chak (Persian: هلوچاك) (Note: Also romanized as Halū Chāk) is a village in Kojid Rural District of Rankuh District in Amlash County, Gilan province, Iran.

== Demographics ==
=== Population ===
At the time of the 2006 National Census, the village's population was 25 in seven households. The census in 2011 counted 21 people in seven households. The 2016 census measured the population of the village as below the reporting threshold.
