= Ostad Kolayeh =

Village in Gilan province, Iran

Ostad Kolayeh Persian: استادكلايه
- Village
- Location within Iran
- Coordinates: 37°06′38″N 50°13′30″E
- Country: Iran
- Province: Gilan
- County: Amlash
- District: Central
- Rural District: Amlash-e Shomali

Population (2016)
  - Total: 483
- Time zone: UTC+3:30 (IRST)

Ostad Kolayeh (Persian: استادكلايه) (Note: Also romanized as Ostād Kolāyeh) is a village in Amlash-e Shomali Rural District of the Central District in Amlash County, Gilan province, Iran.

== Demographics ==
=== Population ===
At the time of the 2006 National Census, the village's population was 521 in 158 households. The following census in 2011 counted 517 people in 179 households. The 2016 census measured the population of the village as 483 people in 180 households.
