= Posht Darreh Lengeh =

Posht Darreh Lengeh پشتدره لنگه
- Village
- Location within Iran
- Coordinates: 37°01′01″N 50°12′27″E
- Country: Iran
- Province: Gilan
- County: Amlash
- Bakhsh: Rankuh
- Rural District: Shabkhus Lat

Population (2016)
  - Total: 59
- Time zone: UTC+3:30 (IRST)

Posht Darreh Lengeh (Persian: پشتدره لنگه; also known as Poshtdar Lengeh) is a village in Shabkhus Lat Rural District, Rankuh District, Amlash County, Gilan Province, Iran. At the 2006 census, its population was 55, in 13 families.

At the time of the 2006 National Census, the village's population was 55 in 13 households. The following census in 2011 counted 42 people in 13 households. The 2016 census measured the population of the village as 59 people in 19 households.
