= Kohneh Guyeh =

Kohneh Guyeh (Persian: كهنه گويه) may refer to:

- Kohneh Guyeh-ye Bala
- Kohneh Guyeh-ye Pain
