= Rudbar-e Deh Sar =

Village in Gilan province, Iran

Rudbar-e Deh Sar Persian: رودبارده سر
- Village
- Location within Iran
- Coordinates: 36°53′01″N 50°09′04″E
- Country: Iran
- Province: Gilan
- County: Amlash
- District: Rankuh
- Rural District: Kojid

Population (2016)
  - Total: 48
- Time zone: UTC+3:30 (IRST)

Rudbar-e Deh Sar (Persian: رودبار ده سر) (Note: Also romanized as Rūdbār-e Deh Sar) is a village in Kojid Rural District of Rankuh District in Amlash County, Gilan province, Iran.

== Demographics ==
=== Population ===
At the time of the 2006 National Census, the village's population was 30 in 11 households. The census in 2011 counted 31 people in 10 households. The 2016 census measured the population of the village as 48 people in 21 households.
