= Chomaqestan =

Chomaqestan (Persian: چماقستان) may refer to:

- Chomaqestan, Amlash
- Chomaqestan, Rudsar
