= Lat Sara =

Lat Sara لاتسرا
- Village
- Location within Iran
- Coordinates: 37°04′01″N 50°14′07″E
- Country: Iran
- Province: Gilan
- County: Amlash
- Bakhsh: Rankuh
- Rural District: Shabkhus Lat

Population (2016)
  - Total: 166
- Time zone: UTC+3:30 (IRST)

Lat Sara (Persian: لاتسرا, also Romanized as Lāt Sarā) is a village in Shabkhus Lat Rural District, Rankuh District, Amlash County, Gilan Province, Iran.

At the time of the 2006 National Census, the village's population was 142 in 38 households. The following census in 2011 counted 141 people in 42 households. The 2016 census measured the population of the village as 166 people in 57 households.
