= Gusht-e Pazan =

Village in Gilan province, Iran

Gusht-e Pazan Persian: گوشتپزان
- Village
- Location within Iran
- Coordinates: 37°02′00″N 50°14′42″E
- Country: Iran
- Province: Gilan
- County: Amlash
- District: Rankuh

Population (2016)
  - Total: 344
- Time zone: UTC+3:30 (IRST)

Gusht-e Pazan (Persian: گوشتپزان) (Note: Also romanized as Gūsht Pazān and Gūsht-e Pazān; also known as Gūsht-e Bozān and Gūsht Parān) is a village in Shabkhus Lat Rural District (Note: Formerly Amlash-e Jonubi Rural District) of Rankuh District in Amlash County, Gilan province, Iran.

== Demographics ==
=== Population ===
At the time of the 2006 National Census, the village's population was 483 in 142 households. The following census in 2011 counted 438 people in 148 households. The 2016 census measured the population of the village as 344 people in 126 households.
