= Tomajan =

Village in Gilan province, Iran

Tomajan Persian: تماجان
- Village
- Location within Iran
- Coordinates: 36°54′16″N 50°05′44″E
- Country: Iran
- Province: Gilan
- County: Amlash
- District: Rankuh
- Rural District: Kojid

Population (2016)
  - Total: 67
- Time zone: UTC+3:30 (IRST)

Tomajan (Persian: تماجان) (Note: Also romanized as Tomājān; also known as Tūmājān) is a village in Kojid Rural District of Rankuh District in Amlash County, Gilan province, Iran.

== Demographics ==
=== Population ===
At the time of the 2006 National Census, the village's population was 71 in 33 households. The census in 2011 counted 23 people in 10 households. The 2016 census measured the population of the village as 67 people in 26 households.
