= Davay-e Lat =

Village in Gilan province, Iran

Davay-e Lat Persian: دعواي لات
- Village
- Country: Iran
- Province: Gilan
- County: Amlash
- District: Central
- Rural District: Amlash-e Jonubi

Population (2016)
  - Total: 320
- Time zone: UTC+3:30 (IRST)

Davay-e Lat (Persian: دعواي لات) (Note: Also romanized as Daʿvāy-e Lāt) is a village in Amlash-e Jonubi Rural District of the Central District in Amlash County, Gilan province, Iran.

== Demographics ==
=== Population ===
At the time of the 2006 National Census, the village's population was 330 in 81 households. The following census in 2011 counted 401 people in 126 households. The 2016 census measured the population of the village as 320 people in 113 households.
