= Ramshayeh =

Ramshayeh رمشايه
- Village
- Location within Iran
- Coordinates: 37°01′22″N 50°16′32″E
- Country: Iran
- Province: Gilan
- County: Amlash
- Bakhsh: Rankuh
- Rural District: Shabkhus Lat

Population (2016)
  - Total: 252
- Time zone: UTC+3:30 (IRST)

Ramshayeh (Persian: رمشايه, also Romanized as Ramshāyeh) is a village in Shabkhus Lat Rural District, Rankuh District, Amlash County, Gilan Province, Iran.

At the time of the 2006 National Census, the village's population was 212 in 60 households. The following census in 2011 counted 219 people in 70 households. The 2016 census measured the population of the village as 252 people in 88 households.
