= Garmay Sar =

Village in Gilan province, Iran

Garmay Sar Persian: گرمايسر
- Village
- Location within Iran
- Coordinates: 36°53′29″N 50°08′59″E
- Country: Iran
- Province: Gilan
- County: Amlash
- District: Rankuh
- Rural District: Kojid

Population (2016)
  - Total: 30
- Time zone: UTC+3:30 (IRST)

Garmay Sar (Persian: گرمايسر) (Note: Also romanized as Garmāy Sar) is a village in Kojid Rural District of Rankuh District in Amlash County, Gilan province, Iran.

== Demographics ==
=== Population ===
At the time of the 2006 National Census, the village's population was 30 in seven households. The census in 2011 counted 29 people in nine households. The 2016 census measured the population of the village as 30 people in 10 households.
