= Siah Kuh, Amlash =

Siah Kuh سیاه‌کوه
- Village
- Location within Iran
- Coordinates: 36°54′29″N 50°02′24″E
- Country: Iran
- Province: Gilan
- County: Amlash
- Bakhsh: Rankuh
- Rural District: Somam

Population (2016)
  - Total: 13
- Time zone: UTC+3:30 (IRST)

Siah Kuh (Persian: سیاهکوه, also Romanized as Sīāh Kūh) is a village in Somam Rural District, Rankuh District, Amlash County, Gilan Province, Iran. At the 2016 census, its population was 13, in 5 families. Decreased from 36 people in 2006.
