= Chahar Deh, Gilan =

Village in Gilan province, Iran

Chahar Deh Persian: چهارده
- Village
- Location within Iran
- Coordinates: 37°06′53″N 50°12′46″E
- Country: Iran
- Province: Gilan
- County: Amlash
- District: Central
- Rural District: Amlash-e Shomali

Population (2016)
  - Total: 374
- Time zone: UTC+3:30 (IRST)

Chahar Deh (Persian: چهارده) (Note: Also romanized as Chahār Deh) is a village in Amlash-e Shomali Rural District of the Central District in Amlash County, Gilan province, Iran.

== Demographics ==
=== Population ===
At the time of the 2006 National Census, the village's population was 449 in 129 households. The following census in 2011 counted 432 people in 135 households. The 2016 census measured the population of the village as 374 people in 135 households.
