= Malekut =

Village in Gilan province, Iran

Malekut Persian: ملكوت
- Village
- Location within Iran
- Coordinates: 36°51′50″N 50°04′20″E
- Country: Iran
- Province: Gilan
- County: Amlash
- District: Rankuh
- Rural District: Somam

Population (2016)
  - Total: 374
- Time zone: UTC+3:30 (IRST)

Malekut (Persian: ملكوت) (Note: Also romanized as Malekūt) is a village in, and the capital of, Somam Rural District in Rankuh District of Amlash County, Gilan province, Iran.

== Demographics ==
=== Population ===
At the time of the 2006 National Census, the village's population was 397 residents in 101 households. The following census in 2011 counted 365 people in 106 households. The 2016 census measured the population of the village as 374 people in 126 households.
