= Keshmesh =

Keshmesh كشمش
- Village
- Location within Iran
- Coordinates: 36°51′10″N 50°07′46″E
- Country: Iran
- Province: Gilan
- County: Amlash
- Bakhsh: Rankuh
- Rural District: Somam

Population (2016)
  - Total: 62
- Time zone: UTC+3:30 (IRST)

Keshmesh (Persian: كشمش) is a village in Somam Rural District, Rankuh District, Amlash County, Gilan Province, Iran. At the 2016 census, its population was 62, in 24 families.
