= Karafestan =

Karafestan (Persian: كرفستان) may refer to:

- Karafestan, Amlash
- Karafestan, Siahkal
