= Dimajankesh =

Village in Gilan province, Iran

Dimajankesh Persian: ديماجانكش
- Village
- Location within Iran
- Coordinates: 36°52′36″N 50°08′41″E
- Country: Iran
- Province: Gilan
- County: Amlash
- District: Rankuh
- Rural District: Kojid

Population (2016)
  - Total: 214
- Time zone: UTC+3:30 (IRST)

Dimajankesh (Persian: ديماجانكش) (Note: Also romanized as Dīmājānkesh) is a village in Kojid Rural District of Rankuh District in Amlash County, Gilan province, Iran.

== Demographics ==
=== Population ===
At the time of the 2006 National Census, the village's population was 205 in 56 households. The census in 2011 counted 202 people in 72 households. The 2016 census measured the population of the village as 214 people in 80 households. It was the most populous village in its rural district.

Geography and Environmental context the village is defined by temperate, humid climate and fertile soil. It is characterized by its lush hazelnut orchards and fields of wheat and barley in the Alborz Mountain range.
