= Karaf Mahalleh =

Village in Gilan province, Iran

Karaf Mahalleh Persian: كرفمحله
- Village
- Location within Iran
- Coordinates: 37°06′55″N 50°14′30″E
- Country: Iran
- Province: Gilan
- County: Amlash
- District: Central
- Rural District: Amlash-e Shomali

Population (2016)
  - Total: 324
- Time zone: UTC+3:30 (IRST)

Karaf Mahalleh (Persian: كرفمحله) (Note: Also romanized as Karaf Maḩalleh) is a village in Amlash-e Shomali Rural District of the Central District in Amlash County, Gilan province, Iran.

== Demographics ==
=== Population ===
At the time of the 2006 National Census, the village's population was 270 in 86 households. The following census in 2011 counted 305 people in 99 households. The 2016 census measured the population of the village as 324 people in 122 households.
