= Shahr-e Somam =

Village in Gilan province, Iran

Shahr-e Somam Persian: شهرسمام
- Village
- Location within Iran
- Coordinates: 36°55′15″N 50°06′44″E
- Country: Iran
- Province: Gilan
- County: Amlash
- District: Rankuh
- Rural District: Kojid

Population (2016)
  - Total: 34
- Time zone: UTC+3:30 (IRST)

Shahr-e Somam (Persian: شهرسمام) (Note: Also romanized as Shahr-e Somām and Shahr-i-Samān; also known as Shahr-e Sām) is a village in Kojid Rural District of Rankuh District in Amlash County, Gilan province, Iran.

== Demographics ==
=== Population ===
At the time of the 2006 National Census, the village's population was 26 in eight households. The census in 2011 counted 22 people in eight households. The 2016 census measured the population of the village as 34 people in 12 households.
