= Sur Shafilat =

Village in Gilan province, Iran

Sur Shafilat Persian: سورشفيع لات
- Village
- Location within Iran
- Country: Iran
- Province: Gilan
- County: Amlash
- District: Rankuh

Population (2016)
  - Total: 369
- Time zone: UTC+3:30 (IRST)

Sur Shafilat (Persian: سورشفيع لات) (Note: Also romanized as Sūr Shafīʿlāt and Sūr Shafīlāt) is a village in Shabkhus Lat Rural District (Note: Formerly Amlash-e Jonubi Rural District) of Rankuh District in Amlash County, Gilan province, Iran.

== Demographics ==
=== Population ===
At the time of the 2006 National Census, the village's population was 321 in 89 households. The following census in 2011 counted 334 people in 111 households. The 2016 census measured the population of the village as 369 people in 128 households.
