= Lalim, Gilan =

Village in Gilan province, Iran

Lalim Persian: لليم
- Village
- Country: Iran
- Province: Gilan
- County: Amlash
- District: Central
- Rural District: Amlash-e Jonubi

Population (2016)
  - Total: 211
- Time zone: UTC+3:30 (IRST)

Lalim (Persian: لليم) (Note: Also romanized as Lalīm) is a village in Amlash-e Jonubi Rural District of the Central District in Amlash County, Gilan province, Iran.

== Demographics ==
=== Population ===
At the time of the 2006 National Census, the village's population was 290 in 79 households. The following census in 2011 counted 251 people in 82 households. The 2016 census measured the population of the village as 211 people in 76 households.
