= Bazguiyeh =

Bazguiyeh بزگويه
- Village
- Interactive map of Bazguiyeh
- Coordinates: 37.028°N 50.184°E
- Country: Iran
- Province: Gilan
- County: Amlash
- Bakhsh: Rankuh
- Rural District: Shabkhus Lat

Population (2016)
  - Total: 201
- Time zone: UTC+3:30 (IRST)

Bazguiyeh (Persian: بزگويه, also Romanized as Bazgūīyeh, also known as Bozkūīyeh) is a village in Shabkhus Lat Rural District, Rankuh District, Amlash County, Gilan Province, Iran.

At the time of the 2006 National Census, the village's population was 203 in 57 households. The following census in 2011 counted 202 people in 64 households. The 2016 census measured the population of the village as 201 people in 70 households.
