= Shuleh =

Shuleh or Shooleh (Persian: شوله) may refer to:

- Shuleh, Chaharmahal and Bakhtiari
- Shuleh, Gilan
