= Yusefabad, Rankuh =

Yusefabad يوسف آباد
- Village
- Interactive map of Yusefabad
- Coordinates: 37.05961°N 50.222336°E
- Country: Iran
- Province: Gilan
- County: Amlash
- Bakhsh: Rankuh
- Rural District: Shabkhus Lat

Population (2006)
  - Total: 187
- Time zone: UTC+3:30 (IRST)

Yusefabad (Persian: يوسف آباد, also Romanized as Yūsefābād) is a village in Shabkhus Lat Rural District, Rankuh District, Amlash County, Gilan Province, Iran.

At the time of the 2006 National Census, the village's population was 195 in 55 households. The following census in 2011 counted 173 people in 54 households. The 2016 census measured the population of the village as 187 people in 65 households.
