= Gavarj =

Village in Gilan province, Iran

Gavarj Persian: گورج
- Village
- Location within Iran
- Coordinates: 36°49′26″N 50°08′11″E
- Country: Iran
- Province: Gilan
- County: Amlash
- District: Rankuh
- Rural District: Somam

Population (2016)
  - Total: 131
- Time zone: UTC+3:30 (IRST)

Gavarj (Persian: گورج) (Note: Also romanized as Gavarj, Gooraj, and Guraj) is a village in Somam Rural District of Rankuh District in Amlash County, Gilan province, Iran.

== Demographics ==
=== Population ===
At the time of the 2006 National Census, the village's population was 158 in 60 households. The following census in 2011 counted 136 people in 54 households. The 2016 census measured the population of the village as 131 people in 58 households.
