= Marbu, Iran =

Village in Gilan province, Iran

Marbu Persian: مربو
- Village
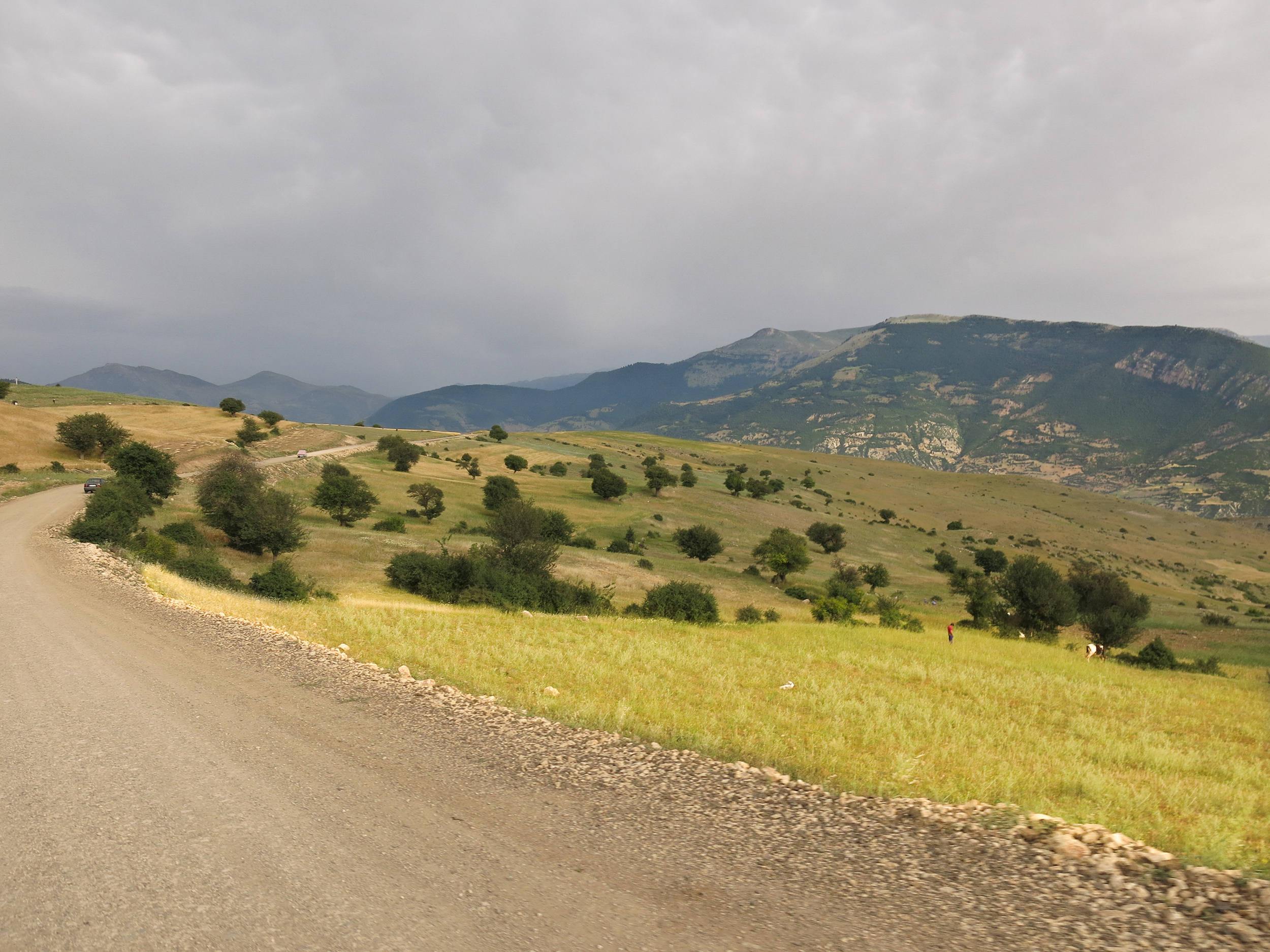
- Nature of Marbu

- Location within Iran
- Coordinates: 36°52′39″N 50°02′09″E
- Country: Iran
- Province: Gilan
- County: Amlash
- District: Rankuh
- Rural District: Somam

Population (2016)
  - Total: 205
- Time zone: UTC+3:30 (IRST)

Marbu (Persian: مربو) (Note: Also romanized as Marbū) is a village in Somam Rural District of Rankuh District in Amlash County, Gilan province, Iran.

== Demographics ==
=== Population ===
At the time of the 2006 National Census, the village's population was 348 in 95 households. The following census in 2011 counted 241 people in 95 households. The 2016 census measured the population of the village as 205 people in 85 households.
