= Garmay Sara =

Village in Gilan province, Iran

Garmay Sara Persian: گرماي سرا
- Village
- Location within Iran
- Coordinates: 37°02′59″N 50°15′21″E
- Country: Iran
- Province: Gilan
- County: Amlash
- District: Rankuh

Population (2016)
  - Total: 325
- Time zone: UTC+3:30 (IRST)

Garmay Sara (Persian: گرماي سرا) (Note: Also romanized as Garmāy Sarā; also known as ‘Alīābād and Garm Āb Sarā) is a village in Shabkhus Lat Rural District (Note: Formerly Amlash-e Jonubi Rural District) of Rankuh District in Amlash County, Gilan province, Iran.

== Demographics ==
=== Population ===
At the time of the 2006 National Census, the village's population was 332 in 82 households. The following census in 2011 counted 312 people in 89 households. The 2016 census measured the population of the village as 325 people in 112 households.
