= Lilij Gavaber =

Lilij Gavaber ليليج گوابر
- Village
- Location within Iran
- Coordinates: 37°02′00″N 50°16′01″E
- Country: Iran
- Province: Gilan
- County: Amlash
- Bakhsh: Rankuh
- Rural District: Shabkhus Lat

Population (2016)
  - Total: 66
- Time zone: UTC+3:30 (IRST)

Lilij Gavaber (Persian: ليليج گوابر, also Romanized as Līlīj Gavāber; also known as Lalīj Gavāber) is a village in Shabkhus Lat Rural District, Rankuh District, Amlash County, Gilan Province, Iran.

At the time of the 2006 National Census, the village's population was 98 in 22 households. The following census in 2011 counted 88 people in 24 households. The 2016 census measured the population of the village as 66 people in 22 households.
