= Kohneh Guyeh-ye Bala =

Kohneh Guyeh-ye Bala كهنه گويه بالا
- Village
- Location within Iran
- Coordinates: 37°03′10″N 50°15′17″E
- Country: Iran
- Province: Gilan
- County: Amlash
- Bakhsh: Rankuh
- Rural District: Shabkhus Lat

Population (2016)
  - Total: 218
- Time zone: UTC+3:30 (IRST)

Kohneh Guyeh-ye Bala (Persian: كهنه گويه بالا, also Romanized as Kohneh Gūyeh-ye Bālā; also known as Kohneh Gūyeh) is a village in Shabkhus Lat Rural District, Rankuh District, Amlash County, Gilan Province, Iran. It is a suburb of Rankuh city.

At the time of the 2006 National Census, the village's population was 285 in 80 households. The following census in 2011 counted 259 people in 83 households. The 2016 census measured the population of the village as 218 people in 79 households.
