= Har Do Ab =

Village in Gilan province, Iran

Har Do Ab Persian: هردواب
- Village
- Location within Iran
- Coordinates: 37°04′14″N 50°09′50″E
- Country: Iran
- Province: Gilan
- County: Amlash
- District: Central
- Rural District: Amlash-e Jonubi

Population (2016)
  - Total: 303
- Time zone: UTC+3:30 (IRST)

Har Do Ab (Persian: هردواب) (Note: Also romanized as Har Do Āb) is a village in Amlash-e Jonubi Rural District of the Central District in Amlash County, Gilan province, Iran.

== Demographics ==
=== Population ===
At the time of the 2006 National Census, the village's population was 291 in 75 households. The following census in 2011 counted 239 people in 74 households. The 2016 census measured the population of the village as 303 people in 107 households.
