= Tazehabad-e Narakeh =

Tazehabad-e Narakeh تازه ابادنركه
- Village
- Location within Iran
- Coordinates: 37°05′03″N 50°12′29″E
- Country: Iran
- Province: Gilan
- County: Amlash
- Bakhsh: Central
- Rural District: Amlash-e Jonubi

Population (2006)
  - Total: 104
- Time zone: UTC+3:30 (IRST)
  - Summer (DST): UTC+4:30 (IRDT)

Tazehabad-e Narakeh (Persian: تازه ابادنركه, also Romanized as Tāzehābād-e Narakeh; also known as Narakeh) is a village in Amlash-e Jonubi Rural District, in the Central District of Amlash County, Gilan Province, Iran. At the 2006 census, its population was 104, in 29 families.
