= Sar Kalleh =

Sar Kalleh سركله
- Village
- Location within Iran
- Coordinates: 37°03′53″N 50°15′55″E
- Country: Iran
- Province: Gilan
- County: Amlash
- Bakhsh: Rankuh
- Rural District: Shabkhus Lat

Population (2016)
  - Total: 220
- Time zone: UTC+3:30 (IRST)

Sar Kalleh (Persian: سركله) is a village in Shabkhus Lat Rural District, Rankuh District, Amlash County, Gilan Province, Iran.

At the time of the 2006 National Census, the village's population was 248 in 63 households. The following census in 2011 counted 209 people in 65 households. The 2016 census measured the population of the village as 220 people in 77 households.
