= Azarbon =

Azarbon (Persian: ازاربن) may refer to:

- Azarbon-e Olya
- Azarbon-e Sofla
