= Golestan Sara, Amlash =

Village in Gilan province, Iran

Golestan Sara Persian: گلستانسرا
- Village
- Location within Iran
- Coordinates: 37.015°N 50.244°E
- Country: Iran
- Province: Gilan
- County: Amlash
- District: Rankuh
- Rural District: Shabkhus Lat

Population (2016)
  - Total: 63
- Time zone: UTC+3:30 (IRST)

Golestan Sara (Persian: گلستانسرا) (Note: Also romanized as Golestān Sarā) is a village in Shabkhus Lat Rural District (Note: Formerly Amlash-e Jonubi Rural District) of Rankuh District in Amlash County, Gilan province, Iran.

== Geography ==
Golestan Sara lies inside the Hyrcanian forests in the northern slopes of the Alborz.

== Demographics ==
=== Population ===
The 2006 and 2011 census results counted a permanent population of 0, stating villagers reside in the village from May to October. The 2016 census measured the population of the village as 63 people in 22 households.
