= Pardin Langeh =

Village in Gilan province, Iran

Pardin Langeh Persian: پردين لنگه
- Village
- Location within Iran
- Coordinates: 37°02′16″N 50°11′23″E
- Country: Iran
- Province: Gilan
- County: Amlash
- District: Rankuh

Population (2016)
  - Total: 309
- Time zone: UTC+3:30 (IRST)

Pardin Langeh (Persian: پردين لنگه) (Note: Also romanized as Pardīn Langeh; formerly known as Parvin Langeh (پروين لنگه), also romanized as Parvīn Langeh) is a village in Shabkhus Lat Rural District (Note: Formerly Amlash-e Jonubi Rural District) of Rankuh District in Amlash County, Gilan province, Iran.

== Demographics ==
=== Population ===
At the time of the 2006 National Census, the village's population, as Parvin Langeh, was 383 in 103 households. The following census in 2011 counted 309 people in 96 households, by which time the village was listed as Pardin Langeh. The 2016 census measured the population of the village as 309 people in 105 households.
