= Esmail Gavabar =

Esmail Gavabar اسماعيل گوابر
- Village
- Location within Iran
- Coordinates: 37°03′13″N 50°13′55″E
- Country: Iran
- Province: Gilan
- County: Amlash
- Bakhsh: Rankuh
- Rural District: Shabkhus Lat

Population (2016)
  - Total: 199
- Time zone: UTC+3:30 (IRST)

Esmail Gavabar (Persian: اسماعيل گوابر, also Romanized as Esmā‘īl Gavābar and Esma‘īl Gavābar; also known as Esmā‘īl Gavābar-e ‘Olyā) is a village in Shabkhus Lat Rural District, Rankuh District, Amlash County, Gilan Province, Iran.

At the time of the 2006 National Census, the village's population was 752 in 213 households. The following census in 2011 counted 223 people in 76 households. The 2016 census measured the population of the village as 199 people in 76 households.
