= Kojid =

Village in Gilan province, Iran

Kojid Persian: كجيد
- Village
- Location within Iran
- Coordinates: 36°53′26″N 50°07′12″E
- Country: Iran
- Province: Gilan
- County: Amlash
- District: Rankuh
- Rural District: Kojid

Population (2016)
  - Total: 194
- Time zone: UTC+3:30 (IRST)

Kojid (Persian: كجيد) (Note: Also romanized as Kejīd and Kojīd; also known as Kūjed) is a village in, and the capital of, Kojid Rural District in Rankuh District of Amlash County, Gilan province, Iran.

== Demographics ==
=== Population ===
At the time of the 2006 National Census, the village's population was 245 in 92 households. The following census in 2011 counted 263 people in 103 households. The 2016 census measured the population of the village as 194 people in 83 households.
