= Siah Estakhr =

Siah Estakhr سياه استخر
- Village
- Location within Iran
- Coordinates: 36°49′17″N 50°06′41″E
- Country: Iran
- Province: Gilan
- County: Amlash
- Bakhsh: Rankuh
- Rural District: Somam

Population (2016)
  - Total: 35
- Time zone: UTC+3:30 (IRST)

Siah Estakhr (Persian: سياه استخر, also Romanized as Sīāh Estakhr and Sīyāhestakhr) is a village that is located in the Somam Rural District of Rankuh District, in Amlash County, Gilan Province, Iran. At the 2016 census, its population was 35, in 14 families. Down from 55 people in 2006.
