= Jir Gavaber, Amlash =

Village in Gilan province, Iran

Jir Gavaber Persian: جيرگوابر
- Village
- Location within Iran
- Coordinates: 37°02′20″N 50°12′08″E
- Country: Iran
- Province: Gilan
- County: Amlash
- District: Rankuh

Population (2016)
  - Total: 638
- Time zone: UTC+3:30 (IRST)

Jir Gavaber (Persian: جيرگوابر) (Note: Also romanized as Jīr Gavāber, Jīrgavābar, and Jīrgovāber) is a village in Shabkhus Lat Rural District (Note: Formerly Amlash-e Jonubi Rural District) of Rankuh District in Amlash County, Gilan province, Iran.

== Demographics ==
=== Population ===
At the time of the 2006 National Census, the village's population was 821 in 230 households. The following census in 2011 counted 733 people in 250 households. The 2016 census measured the population of the village as 638 people in 233 households.
