= Shir Darreh, Gilan =

Shir Darreh شيردره
- Village
- Location within Iran
- Coordinates: 37°00′22″N 50°10′26″E
- Country: Iran
- Province: Gilan
- County: Amlash
- Bakhsh: Central
- Rural District: Amlash-e Jonubi

Population (2006)
  - Total: 39
- Time zone: UTC+3:30 (IRST)
  - Summer (DST): UTC+4:30 (IRDT)

Shir Darreh (Persian: شيردره, also Romanized as Shīr Darreh and Shīrdarreh) is a village in Amlash-e Jonubi Rural District, in the Central District of Amlash County, Gilan Province, Iran. At the 2006 census, its population was 39, in 11 families.
