= Shandar-e Balnageh =

Village in Gilan province, Iran

Shandar-e Balnageh Persian: شندربالنگه
- Village
- Location within Iran
- Coordinates: 37°04′16″N 50°11′43″E
- Country: Iran
- Province: Gilan
- County: Amlash
- District: Central
- Rural District: Amlash-e Jonubi

Population (2016)
  - Total: 211
- Time zone: UTC+3:30 (IRST)

Shandar-e Balnageh (Persian: شندربالنگه) (Note: Also romanized as Shandar-e Bālangeh; also known as Shandar) is a village in Amlash-e Jonubi Rural District of the Central District in Amlash County, Gilan province, Iran.

== Demographics ==
=== Population ===
At the time of the 2006 National Census, the village's population was 94 in 29 households. The following census in 2011 counted 211 people in 65 households. The 2016 census measured the population of the village as 211 people in 70 households.
