= Mian Sara, Gilan =

Mian Sara ميانسرا
- Village
- Location within Iran
- Coordinates: 37°05′20″N 50°09′50″E
- Country: Iran
- Province: Gilan
- County: Amlash
- Bakhsh: Central
- Rural District: Amlash-e Jonubi

Population (2006)
  - Total: 47
- Time zone: UTC+3:30 (IRST)
  - Summer (DST): UTC+4:30 (IRDT)

Mian Sara (Persian: ميانسرا, also Romanized as Mīān Sarā and Mīyānsarā) is a village in Amlash-e Jonubi Rural District, in the Central District of Amlash County, Gilan Province, Iran. At the 2006 census, its population was 47, in 10 families.
