= Pain Mahalleh-ye Narakeh =

Village in Gilan province, Iran

Pain Mahalleh-ye Narakeh Persian: پائين محله نركه
- Village
- Location within Iran
- Coordinates: 37°05′19″N 50°13′14″E
- Country: Iran
- Province: Gilan
- County: Amlash
- District: Central
- Rural District: Amlash-e Jonubi

Population (2016)
  - Total: 383
- Time zone: UTC+3:30 (IRST)

Pain Mahalleh-ye Narakeh (Persian: پائين محله نركه) (Note: Also romanized as Pā’īn Maḩalleh-ye Narakeh and Pāeenmaḩalleh-ye Narkeh) is a village in Amlash-e Jonubi Rural District of the Central District in Amlash County, Gilan province, Iran.

== Demographics ==
=== Population ===
At the time of the 2006 National Census, the village's population was 369 in 102 households. The following census in 2011 counted 369 people in 112 households. The 2016 census measured the population of the village as 383 people in 131 households.
