= Latak =

Latak (Persian: لاتك or لتاك) may refer to:

- Latak, Amlash (لاتك - Lātak), Gilan Province
- Latak, Rudsar (لاتك - Lātak), Gilan Province
- Latak, Mazandaran (لتاك - Latāk)
