= Sopordan, Amlash =

Sopordan سپردان
- Village
- Location within Iran
- Coordinates: 37°04′22″N 50°14′32″E
- Country: Iran
- Province: Gilan
- County: Amlash
- Bakhsh: Rankuh
- Rural District: Shabkhus Lat

Population (2016)
  - Total: 85
- Time zone: UTC+3:30 (IRST)

Sopordan (Persian: سپردان, also Romanized as Sopordān) is a village in Shabkhus Lat Rural District, Rankuh District, Amlash County, Gilan Province, Iran.

At the time of the 2006 National Census, the village's population was 133 in 42 households. The following census in 2011 counted 85 people in 32 households. The 2016 census measured the population of the village as 85 people in 37 households.
