= Estakhr Sar =

Estakhr Sar (Persian: استخرسر) may refer to:

- Estakhr Sar, Gilan
- Estakhr Sar, Sari, Mazandaran Province
- Estakhr Sar, Savadkuh, Mazandaran Province
- Estakhr Sar, Tonekabon, Mazandaran Province
