= Latak, Amlash =

Latak لاتک
- Village
- Location within Iran
- Coordinates: 37°02′07″N 50°05′41″E
- Country: Iran
- Province: Gilan
- County: Amlash
- Bakhsh: Rankuh
- Rural District: Shabkhus Lat

Population (2016)
  - Total: 77
- Time zone: UTC+3:30 (IRST)

Latak (Persian: لاتک, also Romanized as Lātak) is a village in Shabkhus Lat Rural District, Rankuh District, Amlash County, Gilan Province, Iran.

At the time of the 2006 National Census, the village's population was 96 in 27 households. The following census in 2011 counted 87 people in 25 households. The 2016 census measured the population of the village as 77 people in 28 households.
