= Kia Kalayeh =

Village in Gilan province, Iran

Kia Kalayeh Persian: كياكلايه
- Village
- Location within Iran
- Coordinates: 37°05′46″N 50°12′44″E
- Country: Iran
- Province: Gilan
- County: Amlash
- District: Central
- Rural District: Amlash-e Shomali

Population (2016)
  - Total: 982
- Time zone: UTC+3:30 (IRST)

Kia Kalayeh (Persian: كياكلايه) (Note: Also romanized as Kīā Kalāyeh and Kīā Kolāyeh) is a village in Amlash-e Shomali Rural District of the Central District in Amlash County, Gilan province, Iran.

== Demographics ==
=== Population ===
At the time of the 2006 National Census, the village's population was 1,161 in 349 households. The following census in 2011 counted 1,175 people in 397 households. The 2016 census measured the population of the village as 982 people in 352 households. It was the most populous village in its rural district.
