= Tarom Sara, Amlash =

Tarom Sara طارمسرا
- Village
- Location within Iran
- Coordinates: 37°00′54″N 50°09′36″E
- Country: Iran
- Province: Gilan
- County: Amlash
- Bakhsh: Rankuh
- Rural District: Shabkhus Lat

Population (2016)
  - Total: 37
- Time zone: UTC+3:30 (IRST)

Tarom Sara (Persian: طارمسرا, also Romanized as Ţārom Sarā; also known as Tarmī Sarā) is a village in Shabkhus Lat Rural District, Rankuh District, Amlash County, Gilan Province, Iran.

At the time of the 2006 National Census, the village's population was 16 in 6 households. The following census in 2011 counted 9 people in 4 households. The 2016 census measured the population of the village as 37 people in 13 households.
