= Larud =

Village in Gilan province, Iran

Larud Persian: لرود
- Village
- Location within Iran
- Coordinates: 36°52′31″N 50°02′43″E
- Country: Iran
- Province: Gilan
- County: Amlash
- District: Rankuh
- Rural District: Somam

Population (2016)
  - Total: 442
- Time zone: UTC+3:30 (IRST)

Larud (Persian: لرود) (Note: Also romanized as Larūd; also known as Lūrd) is a village in Somam Rural District of Rankuh District in Amlash County, Gilan province, Iran.

== Demographics ==
=== Population ===
At the time of the 2006 National Census, the village's population was 520 in 113 households. The following census in 2011 counted 418 people in 129 households. The 2016 census measured the population of the village as 442 people in 158 households.
