= Estakhr Sar, Gilan =

Village in Gilan province, Iran

Estakhr Sar Persian: استخرسر
- Village
- Location within Iran
- Coordinates: 36°52′10″N 50°07′51″E
- Country: Iran
- Province: Gilan
- County: Amlash
- District: Rankuh
- Rural District: Kojid

Population (2016)
  - Total: 63
- Time zone: UTC+3:30 (IRST)

Estakhr Sar (Persian: استخرسر) is a village in Kojid Rural District of Rankuh District in Amlash County, Gilan province, Iran.

== Demographics ==
=== Population ===
At the time of the 2006 National Census, the village's population was 69 in 24 households. The census in 2011 counted 54 people in 18 households. The 2016 census measured the population of the village as 63 people in 25 households.
