= Kohneh Guyeh-ye Pain =

Kohneh Guyeh-ye Pain كهنه گويه پايين
- Village
- Location within Iran
- Coordinates: 37°03′10″N 50°15′17″E
- Country: Iran
- Province: Gilan
- County: Amlash
- Bakhsh: Rankuh
- Rural District: Shabkhus Lat

Population (2016)
  - Total: 100
- Time zone: UTC+3:30 (IRST)

Kohneh Guyeh-ye Pain (Persian: كهنه گويه پايين, also Romanized as Kohneh Gūyeh-ye Pā’īn; also known as Kohneh Gūyeh) is a village in Shabkhus Lat Rural District, Rankuh District, Amlash County, Gilan Province, Iran.

At the time of the 2006 National Census, the village's population was 111 in 36 households. The following census in 2011 counted 107 people in 38 households. The 2016 census measured the population of the village as 100 people in 39 households.
