= Lurd =

Lurd may refer to:

- Lurd, Iran
- Liberians United for Reconciliation and Democracy (LURD)
