= Tabestan Neshin =

Village in Gilan province, Iran

Tabestan Neshin Persian: تابستان نشين
- Village
- Location within Iran
- Coordinates: 37°03′24″N 50°08′49″E
- Country: Iran
- Province: Gilan
- County: Amlash
- District: Central
- Rural District: Amlash-e Jonubi

Population (2016)
  - Total: 252
- Time zone: UTC+3:30 (IRST)

Tabestan Neshin (Persian: تابستان نشين) (Note: Also romanized as Tābestān Neshīn) is a village in Amlash-e Jonubi Rural District of the Central District in Amlash County, Gilan province, Iran.

== Demographics ==
=== Population ===
At the time of the 2006 National Census, the village's population was 267 in 78 households. The following census in 2011 counted 179 people in 56 households. The 2016 census measured the population of the village as 252 people in 90 households.
