= Kaghazi =

Kaghazi (Persian: كاغذي) may refer to:

- Kaghazi, Gilan
- Kaghazi, Isfahan
