= Kaghazi, Gilan =

Kaghazi کاغذی
- Village
- Interactive map of Kaghazi
- Coordinates: 36°48′51.24″N 50°6′33.74″E
- Country: Iran
- Province: Gilan
- County: Amlash
- Bakhsh: Rankuh
- Rural District: Somam

Population (2016)
  - Total: 20
- Time zone: UTC+3:30 (IRST)

Kaghazi (Persian: کاغذی, also Romanized as Kāghaz̄ī) is a village in Somam Rural District, Rankuh District, Amlash County, Gilan Province, Iran. At the 2016 census, its population was 20, in 8 families. Up from 14 people in 2006.
