= Musa Kalayeh =

Village in Gilan province, Iran

Musa Kalayeh Persian: موسی كلايه
- Village
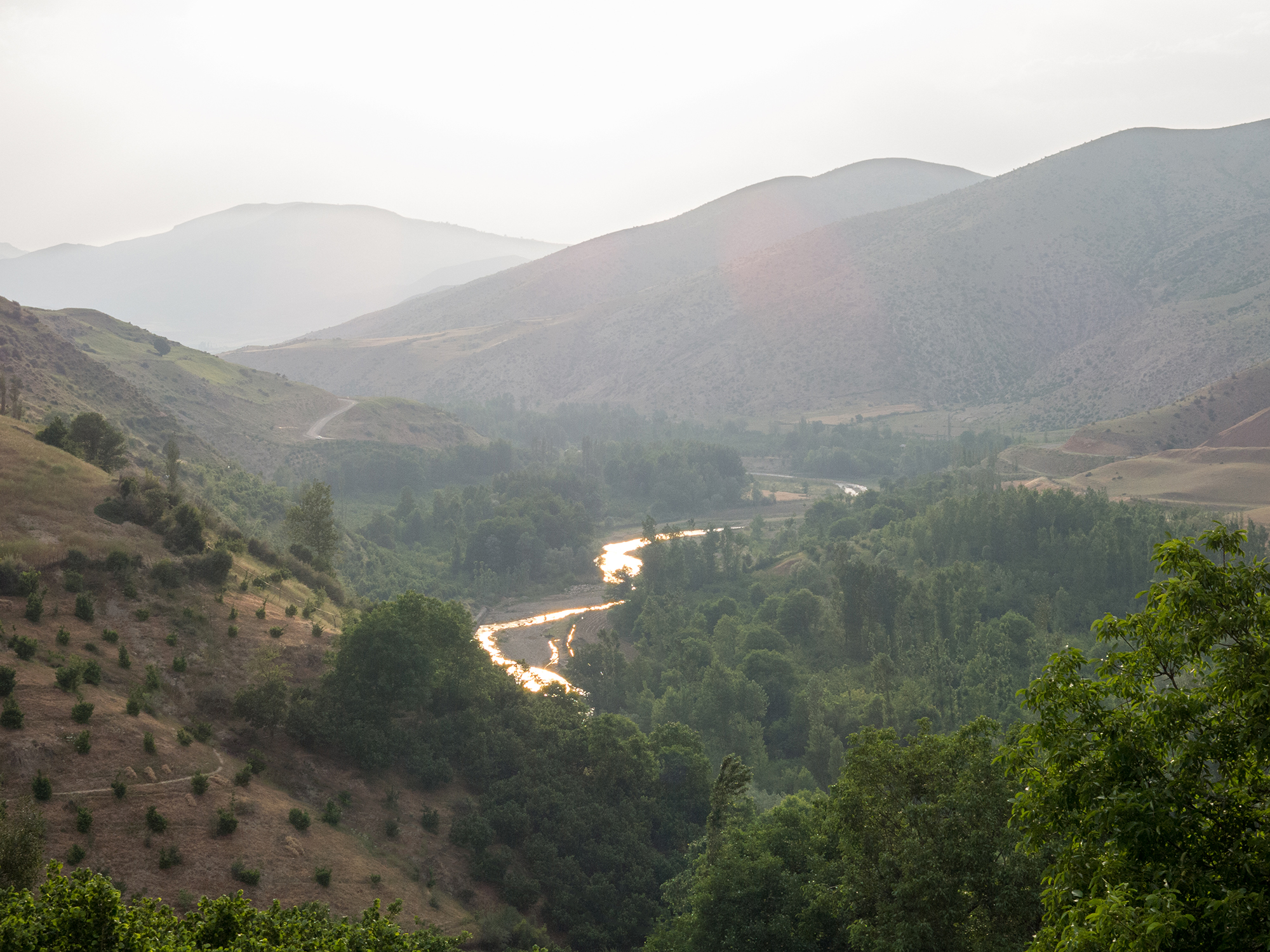
- Fruit orchards in the village of Musa Kalayeh

- Location within Iran
- Coordinates: 36°49′59″N 50°04′45″E
- Country: Iran
- Province: Gilan
- County: Amlash
- District: Rankuh
- Rural District: Somam

Population (2016)
  - Total: 694
- Time zone: UTC+3:30 (IRST)

Musa Kalayeh (Persian: موسی كلايه) (Note: Also romanized as Mūsá Kalāyeh) is a village in Somam Rural District of Rankuh District in Amlash County, Gilan province, Iran.

== Demographics ==
=== Population ===
At the time of the 2006 National Census, the village's population was 805 in 196 households. The following census in 2011 counted 800 people in 236 households. The 2016 census measured the population of the village as 694 people in 226 households. It was the most populous village in its rural district.
