= Asak, Gilan =

Asak اسک
- Village
- Location within Iran
- Coordinates: 36°51′16″N 50°03′08″E
- Country: Iran
- Province: Gilan
- County: Amlash
- Bakhsh: Rankuh
- Rural District: Somam

Population (2016)
  - Total: 18
- Time zone: UTC+3:30 (IRST)

Asak (Persian: اسک) is a village in Somam Rural District, Rankuh District, Amlash County, Gilan Province, Iran. At the 2006 census, its population was 18, in 9 families. Down from 25 people in 2006.
