= Bala Mahalleh-ye Narakeh =

Village in Gilan province, Iran

Bala Mahalleh-ye Narakeh Persian: بالامحله نركه
- Village
- Location within Iran
- Coordinates: 37°04′51″N 50°12′33″E
- Country: Iran
- Province: Gilan
- County: Amlash
- District: Central
- Rural District: Amlash-e Jonubi

Population (2016)
  - Total: 298
- Time zone: UTC+3:30 (IRST)

Bala Mahalleh-ye Narakeh (Persian: بالامحله نركه) (Note: Also romanized as Bālā Maḩalleh-ye Narakeh and Bālāmaḩalleh-ye Narkeh) is a village in Amlash-e Jonubi Rural District of the Central District in Amlash County, Gilan province, Iran.

== Demographics ==
=== Population ===
At the time of the 2006 National Census, the village's population was 325 in 92 households. The following census in 2011 counted 311 people in 107 households. The 2016 census measured the population of the village as 298 people in 116 households.
