= Kohneh Gurab, Amlash =

Village in Gilan province, Iran

Kohneh Gurab Persian: كهنه گوراب
- Village
- Location within Iran
- Coordinates: 37°06′21″N 50°14′27″E
- Country: Iran
- Province: Gilan
- County: Amlash
- District: Central
- Rural District: Amlash-e Shomali

Population (2016)
  - Total: 211
- Time zone: UTC+3:30 (IRST)

Kohneh Gurab (Persian: كهنه گوراب) (Note: Also romanized as Kohneh Goorab and Kohneh Gūrāb; also known as Kohneh Gorāb) is a village in, and the capital of, Amlash-e Shomali Rural District in the Central District of Amlash County, Gilan province, Iran.

== Demographics ==
=== Population ===
At the time of the 2006 National Census, the village's population was 209 in 69 households. The following census in 2011 counted 221 people in 75 households. The 2016 census measured the population of the village as 211 people in 78 households.
