= Karafestan, Amlash =

Village in Gilan province, Iran

Karafestan Persian: كرفستان
- Village
- Location within Iran
- Coordinates: 37°06′13″N 50°15′24″E
- Country: Iran
- Province: Gilan
- County: Amlash
- District: Central
- Rural District: Amlash-e Shomali

Population (2016)
  - Total: 330
- Time zone: UTC+3:30 (IRST)

Karafestan (Persian: كرفستان) (Note: Also romanized as Karafestān) is a village in Amlash-e Shomali Rural District of the Central District in Amlash County, Gilan province, Iran.

== Demographics ==
=== Population ===
At the time of the 2006 National Census, the village's population was 336 in 110 households. The following census in 2011 counted 341 people in 122 households. The 2016 census measured the population of the village as 330 people in 130 households.
