= Kohneh Gurab =

Kohneh Gurab or Kohneh Goorab (Persian: كهنه گوراب) may refer to:

- Kohneh Gurab, Amlash
- Kohneh Gurab, Fuman
