= Shah Neshin Gorj Castle =

Castle in Gilan Province, Iran

Shah Neshin Gorj castle
- قلعه شاه نشین گورج

General information
- Type: Castle
- Location: Amlash County, Iran

Shah Neshin Gorj castle (Persian: قلعه شاه نشین گورج) is a historical castle located in Amlash County in Gilan Province, Iran. The longevity of this fortress dates back to the Historical periods after Islam.
