= Azarbon-e Olya =

Village in Gilan province, Iran

Azarbon-e Olya Persian: آزاربن عليا
- Village
- Location within Iran
- Coordinates: 37°02′49″N 50°16′47″E
- Country: Iran
- Province: Gilan
- County: Amlash
- District: Rankuh

Population (2016)
  - Total: 368
- Time zone: UTC+3:30 (IRST)

Azarbon-e Olya (Persian: آزاربن عليا) (Note: Also romanized as Āzārbon-e ‘Olyā; also known as Āzarbon and Āzārbon) is a village in Shabkhus Lat Rural District (Note: Formerly Amlash-e Jonubi Rural District) of Rankuh District in Amlash County, Gilan province, Iran.

== Demographics ==
=== Population ===
At the time of the 2006 National Census, the village's population was 376 in 103 households. The following census in 2011 counted 398 people in 124 households. The 2016 census measured the population of the village as 368 people in 124 households.
