= Bagh Mahalleh-ye Narakeh =

Village in Gilan province, Iran

Bagh Mahalleh-ye Narakeh Persian: باغ محله نركه
- Village
- Location within Iran
- Country: Iran
- Province: Gilan
- County: Amlash
- District: Central
- Rural District: Amlash-e Jonubi

Population (2016)
  - Total: 232
- Time zone: UTC+3:30 (IRST)

Bagh Mahalleh-ye Narakeh (Persian: باغ محله نركه) (Note: Also romanized as Bāgh Maḩalleh-ye Narakeh; also known as Bāghmaḩalleh-ye Ḩājīābād) is a village in Amlash-e Jonubi Rural District of the Central District in Amlash County, Gilan province, Iran.

== Demographics ==
=== Population ===
At the time of the 2006 National Census, the village's population was 185 in 51 households. The following census in 2011 counted 242 people in 74 households. The 2016 census measured the population of the village as 232 people in 79 households.
