= Bala Halu Sara =

Bala Halu Sara بالاهلوسرا
- Village
- Location within Iran
- Coordinates: 37°01′45″N 50°15′31″E
- Country: Iran
- Province: Gilan
- County: Amlash
- Bakhsh: Rankuh
- Rural District: Shabkhus Lat

Population (2016)
  - Total: 162
- Time zone: UTC+3:30 (IRST)

Bala Halu Sara (Persian: بالاهلوسرا) (Note: Also romanized as Bala Holu Sara and Bālā Holū Sarā) is a village in Shabkhus Lat Rural District, Rankuh District, Amlash County, Gilan Province, Iran. At the 2016 census, its population was 162, in 56 families. Down from 195 people in 2006.
