= Shir Darreh =

Shir Darreh or Shirdarreh (Persian: شيردره) may refer to:

- Shir Darreh, Gilan
- Shir Darreh, Mazandaran
