= Shuleh, Gilan =

Village in Gilan province, Iran

Shuleh Persian: شوله
- Village
- Location within Iran
- Coordinates: 36°53′48″N 50°09′08″E
- Country: Iran
- Province: Gilan
- County: Amlash
- District: Rankuh
- Rural District: Kojid

Population (2016)
  - Total: 33
- Time zone: UTC+3:30 (IRST)

Shuleh (Persian: شوله) (Note: Also romanized as Shūleh) is a village in Kojid Rural District of Rankuh District in Amlash County, Gilan province, Iran.

== Demographics ==
=== Population ===
At the time of the 2006 National Census, the village's population was 39 in 11 households. The census in 2011 counted 35 people in 11 households. The 2016 census measured the population of the village as 33 people in 13 households.
