= Azarbon-e Sofla =

Azarbon-e Sofla آزاربن سفلی
- Village
- Location within Iran
- Coordinates: 37°02′52″N 50°16′32″E
- Country: Iran
- Province: Gilan
- County: Amlash
- Bakhsh: Rankuh
- Rural District: Shabkhus Lat

Population (2016)
  - Total: 208
- Time zone: UTC+3:30 (IRST)

Azarbon-e Sofla (Persian: آزاربن سفلی, also Romanized as Āzārbon-e Soflá; also known as Āzarbon and Āzārbon) is a village in Shabkhus Lat Rural District, Rankuh District, Amlash County, Gilan Province, Iran. At the 2006 census, its population was 208, in 58 families.

At the time of the 2006 National Census, the village's population was 208 in 58 households. The following census in 2011 counted 232 people in 70 households. The 2016 census measured the population of the village as 208 people in 75 households.
