= Buyeh, Gilan =

Village in Gilan province, Iran

Buyeh Persian: بويه
- Village
- Location within Iran
- Coordinates: 36°51′12″N 50°06′26″E
- Country: Iran
- Province: Gilan
- County: Amlash
- District: Rankuh
- Rural District: Somam

Population (2016)
  - Total: 214
- Time zone: UTC+3:30 (IRST)

Buyeh (Persian: بويه) (Note: Also romanized as Buyeh) is a village in Somam Rural District of Rankuh District in Amlash County, Gilan province, Iran.

== History ==
The name of this village is attributed to the Buyid dynasty of the 10th & 11th century which ruled over much of Iran and most of Iraq. The founders like that of Imad al-Dawla were ethnically Daylamite, originating here in Amlash County.

== Demographics ==
=== Language ===
Buyeh is a Gilaki-speaking village.

=== Population ===
At the time of the 2006 National Census, the village's population was 286 in 100 households. The following census in 2011 counted 220 people in 75 households. The 2016 census measured the population of the village as 214 people in 87 households.
