= Omam =

Omam may refer to:

- Of Mice and Men, a 1937 novella by John Steinbeck.
- Trachyspermum ammi, a plant
- Of Monsters and Men, an Icelandic band
- Omam, Iran, a village
