= Tarom Sara =

Tarom Sara (Persian: طارم سرا) may refer to:

- Tarom Sara, Amlash
- Tarom Sara, Rezvanshahr
