= Shabkhus Sara =

Shabkhus Sara شبخوس سرا
- Village
- Location within Iran
- Coordinates: 37°02′23″N 50°13′04″E
- Country: Iran
- Province: Gilan
- County: Amlash
- Bakhsh: Rankuh
- Rural District: Shabkhus Lat

Population (2016)
  - Total: 88
- Time zone: UTC+3:30 (IRST)

Shabkhus Sara (Persian: شبخوس سرا, also Romanized as Shabkhūs Sarā) is a village in Shabkhus Lat Rural District, Rankuh District, Amlash County, Gilan Province, Iran.

At the time of the 2006 National Census, the village's population was 121 in 32 households. The following census in 2011 counted 101 people in 35 households. The 2016 census measured the population of the village as 88 people in 32 households.
