= Pain Halu Sara =

Village in Gilan province, Iran

Pain Halu Sara Persian: پائين هلوسرا
- Village
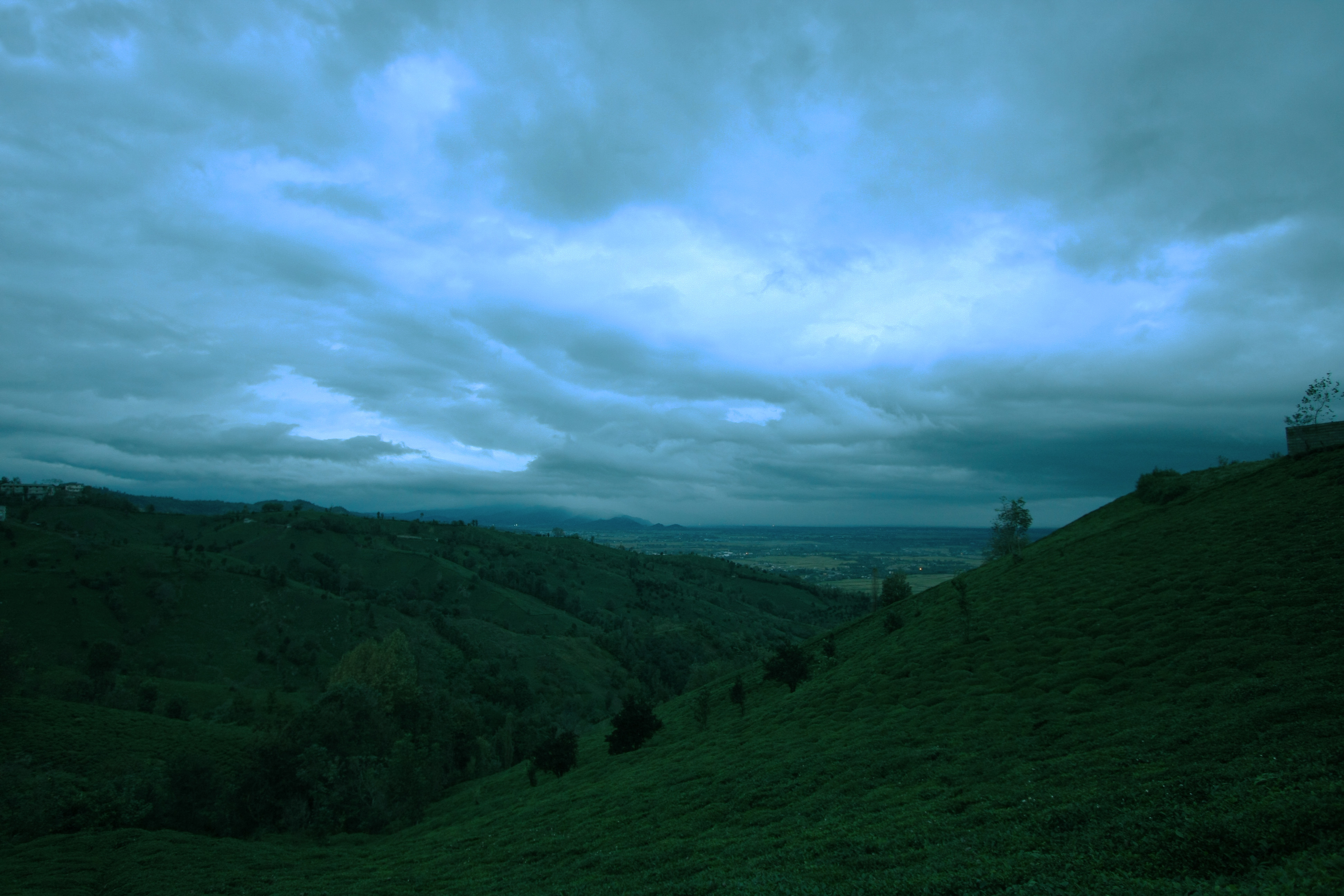
- The village of Pain Halu Sara

- Location within Iran
- Coordinates: 37°02′34″N 50°15′51″E
- Country: Iran
- Province: Gilan
- County: Amlash
- District: Rankuh

Population (2016)
  - Total: 656
- Time zone: UTC+3:30 (IRST)

Pain Halu Sara (Persian: پائين هلوسرا) (Note: Also romanized as Pā’īn Halū Sarā; also known as Halū Sarā-ye Pā’īn) is a village in Shabkhus Lat Rural District (Note: Formerly Amlash-e Jonubi Rural District) of Rankuh District in Amlash County, Gilan province, Iran.

== Demographics ==
=== Population ===
At the time of the 2006 National Census, the village's population was 701 in 177 households. The following census in 2011 counted 690 people in 211 households. The 2016 census measured the population of the village as 656 people in 230 households.
