= Umam =

Umam may refer to:

- Emam, Gilan, a village in Gilan Province, Iran
- Umam Documentation & Research, a nonprofit cultural organization
