= Chomaqestan, Amlash =

Village in Gilan province, Iran

Chomaqestan Persian: چماقستان
- Village
- Location within Iran
- Coordinates: 37°08′02″N 50°12′06″E
- Country: Iran
- Province: Gilan
- County: Amlash
- District: Central
- Rural District: Amlash-e Shomali

Population (2016)
  - Total: 649
- Time zone: UTC+3:30 (IRST)

Chomaqestan (Persian: چماقستان) (Note: Also romanized as Chomāqestān) is a village in Amlash-e Shomali Rural District of the Central District in Amlash County, Gilan province, Iran.

== Demographics ==
=== Population ===
At the time of the 2006 National Census, the village's population was 712 in 227 households. The following census in 2011 counted 605 people in 208 households. The 2016 census measured the population of the village as 649 people in 241 households.
