= Kojid Rural District =

Rural district in Gilan province, Iran

Kojid Rural District Persian: دهستان كجيد
- Rural District
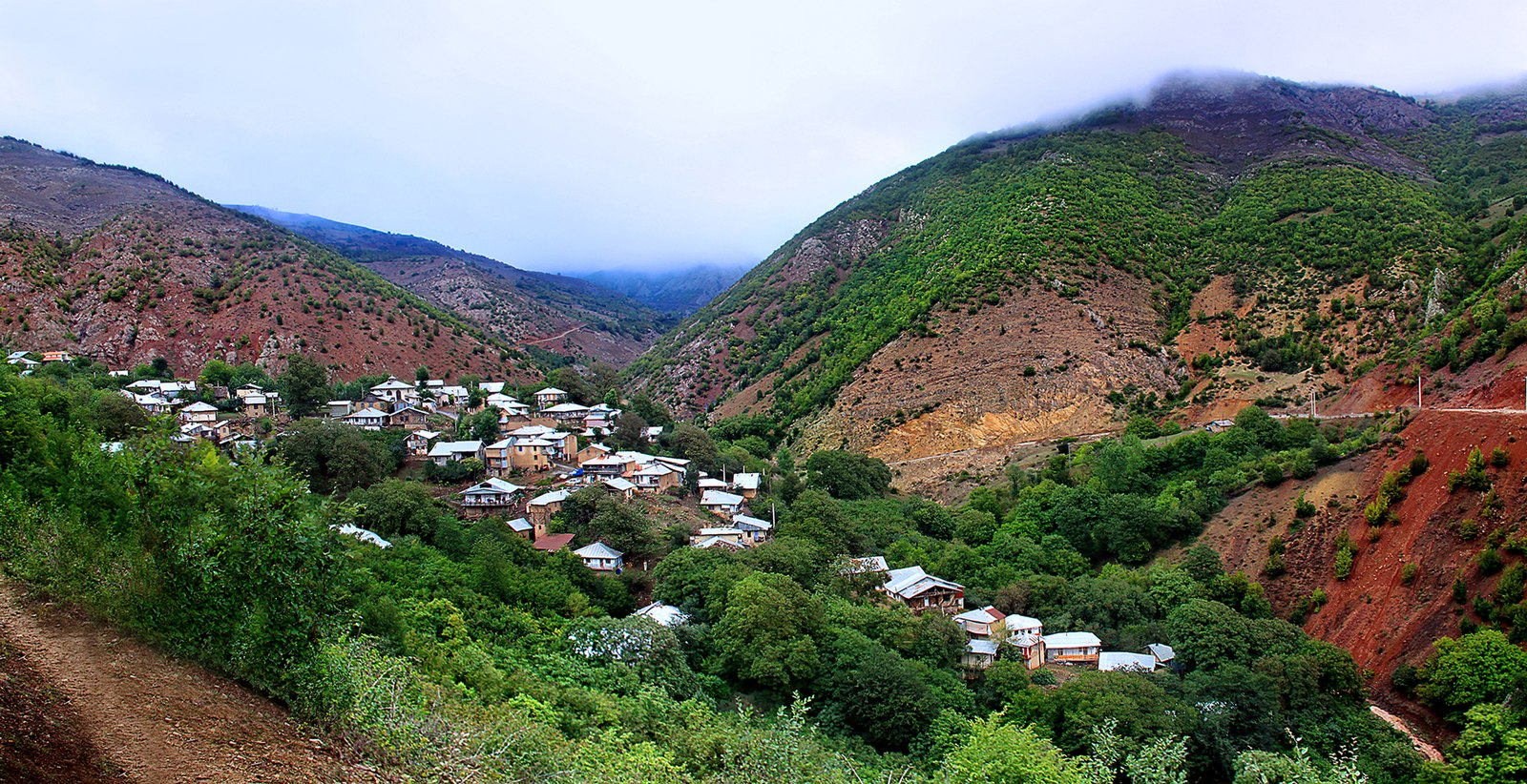

- Location within Iran
- Coordinates: 36°55′N 50°07′E
- Country: Iran
- Province: Gilan
- County: Amlash
- District: Rankuh
- Established: 1993
- Capital: Kojid

Population (2016)
  - Total: 879
- Time zone: UTC+3:30 (IRST)

Kojid Rural District (Persian: دهستان كجيد) is in Rankuh District of Amlash County, Gilan province, Iran. Its capital is the village of Kojid.

== Demographics ==
=== Population ===
At the time of the 2006 National Census, the rural district's population was 903 in 307 households. There were 841 inhabitants in 309 households at the following census of 2011. The 2016 census measured the population of the rural district as 879 in 353 households. The most populous of its 19 villages was Dimajankesh, with 214 people.

=== Other villages in the rural district ===
- Alankangeh
- Babajan Darreh
- Estakhr Sar
- Garmay Sar
- Halu Chak
- Khasil-e Dasht
- Malja Dasht
- Motla Kuh
- Rudbar-e Deh Sar
- Sar Tarbat
- Shahr-e Somam
- Shuleh
- Taresh
- Tomajan
