= Somam Rural District =

Rural district in Gilan province, Iran

Somam Rural District Persian: دهستان سمام
- Rural District
- Location within Iran
- Coordinates: 36°53′N 50°05′E
- Country: Iran
- Province: Gilan
- County: Amlash
- District: Rankuh
- Established: 1987
- Capital: Malekut

Population (2016)
  - Total: 2,793
- Time zone: UTC+3:30 (IRST)

Somam Rural District (Persian: دهستان سمام) is in Rankuh District of Amlash County, Gilan province, Iran. Its capital is the village of Malekut.

== Demographics ==
=== Population ===
At the time of the 2006 National Census, the rural district's population was 3,332 in 961 households. There were 2,818 inhabitants in 955 households at the following census of 2011. The 2016 census measured the population of the rural district as 2,793 in 1,049 households. The most populous of its 21 villages was Musa Kalayeh, with 694 people.

=== Other villages in the rural district ===
- Asak
- Buyeh
- Emam
- Gavarj
- Kaghazi
- Kakrud
- Kalam Rud
- Keshmesh
- Larud
- Malekut
- Marbu
- Shiyeh
- Siah Estakhr
- Siah Khulak
- Siah Kuh
- Zahun Bareh
