= Amlash =

City in Gilan province, Iran

Amlash Persian: املش
- City
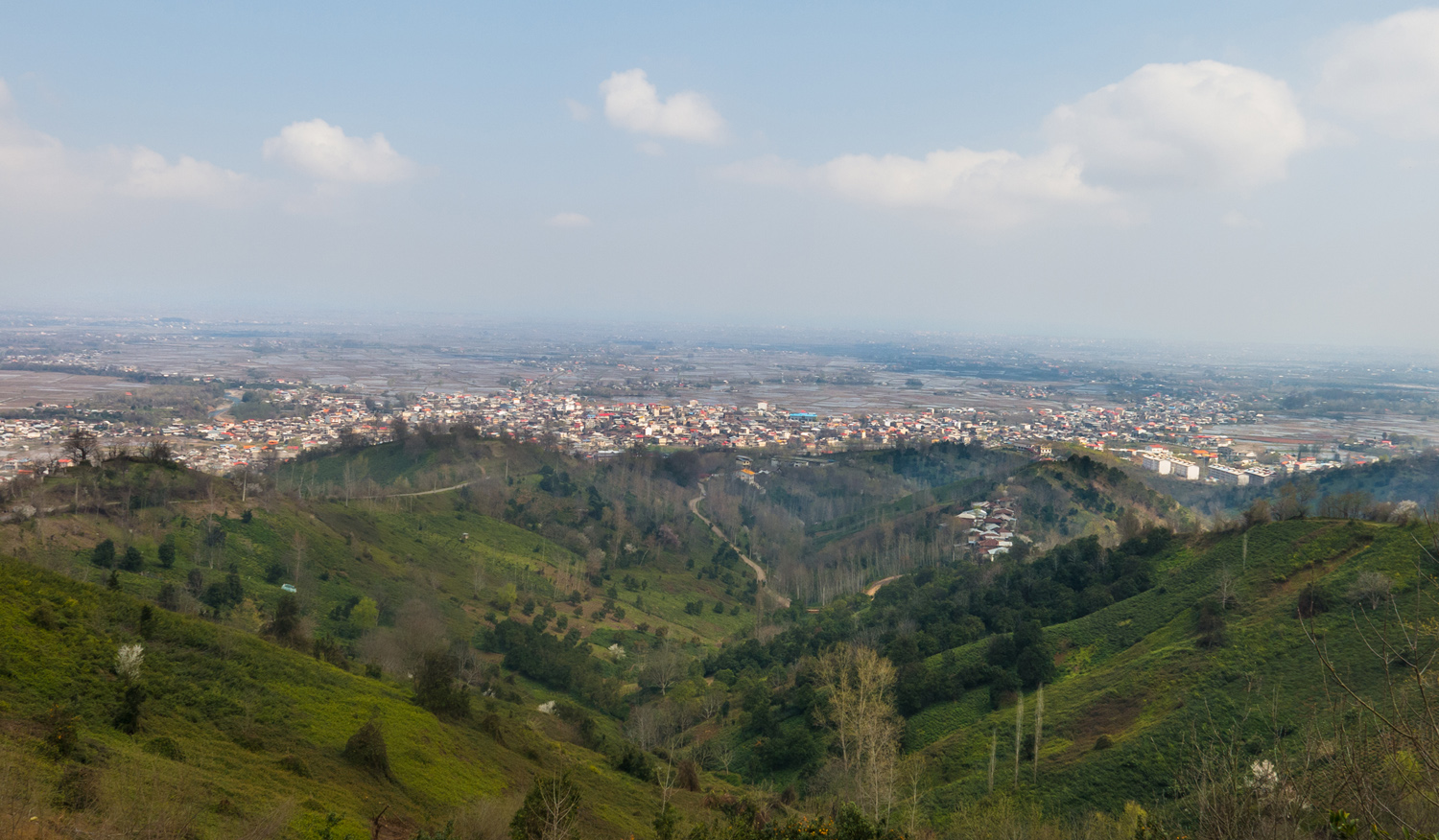

- Location within Iran
- Coordinates: 37°05′40″N 50°11′34″E
- Country: Iran
- Province: Gilan
- County: Amlash
- District: Central

Population (2016)
  - Total: 15,444
- Time zone: UTC+3:30 (IRST)

Amlash (Persian: املش) (Note: Also romanized as Amlesh; also known as Amlish) is a city in the Central District of Amlash County, Gilan province, in northwestern Iran, serving as capital of both the county and the district.

== Demographics ==
=== Population ===
At the time of the 2006 National Census, the city's population was 15,047 in 4,350 households. The following census in 2011 counted 14,915 people in 4,718 households. The 2016 census measured the population of the city as 15,444 people in 5,268 households.
