= Emam, Gilan =

Village in Gilan province, Iran

Emam Persian: امام
- Village
- Location within Iran
- Coordinates: 36°53′29″N 50°04′13″E
- Country: Iran
- Province: Gilan
- County: Amlash
- District: Rankuh
- Rural District: Somam

Population (2016)
  - Total: 127
- Time zone: UTC+3:30 (IRST)

Emam (Persian: امام) (Note: Also romanized as Emām; also known as Omām and Umām) is a village in Somam Rural District of Rankuh District in Amlash County, Gilan province, Iran.

== Demographics ==
=== Population ===
At the time of the 2006 National Census, the village's population was 122 in 51 households. The following census in 2011 counted 67 people in 34 households. The 2016 census measured the population of the village as 127 people in 49 households.

== Archeology ==
Excavations in the vicinity of Emam in 1955 revealed a series of ancient burials dating to the early Iron age. The three different types of burials were identified, and grave goods included ceramics and bronze objects such as daggers, earings, and pins.
