= Khomeyr Mahalleh, Rudsar =

Khomeyr Mahalleh خميرمحله
- Village
- Country: Iran
- Province: Gilan
- County: Rudsar
- Bakhsh: Central
- Rural District: Reza Mahalleh

Population (2006)
  - Total: 58
- Time zone: UTC+3:30 (IRST)
  - Summer (DST): UTC+4:30 (IRDT)

Khomeyr Mahalleh (Persian: خميرمحله, also Romanized as Khomeyr Maḩalleh) is a village in Reza Mahalleh Rural District, in the Central District of Rudsar County, Gilan Province, Iran. At the 2006 census, its population was 58, in 20 families.
