= Karafestan, Siahkal =

Karafestan كرفستان
- Village
- Location within Iran
- Coordinates: 37°09′21″N 49°55′10″E
- Country: Iran
- Province: Gilan
- County: Siahkal
- Bakhsh: Central
- Rural District: Malfejan

Population (2016)
  - Total: 109
- Time zone: UTC+3:30 (IRST)

Karafestan (Persian: كرفستان, also romanized as Karafestān) is a village in Malfejan Rural District, in the Central District of Siahkal County, Gilan Province, Iran. At the 2016 census, its population was 109, in 41 families. Up from 92 people in 2006.
