= Khomeyr Mahalleh, Kelachay =

Khomeyr Mahalleh خميرمحله
- Village
- Location within Iran
- Coordinates: 37°03′25″N 50°16′32″E
- Country: Iran
- Province: Gilan
- County: Rudsar
- Bakhsh: Kelachay
- Rural District: Machian

Population (2006)
  - Total: 108
- Time zone: UTC+3:30 (IRST)
  - Summer (DST): UTC+4:30 (IRDT)

Khomeyr Mahalleh (Persian: خميرمحله, also Romanized as Khomeyr Maḩalleh) is a village in Machian Rural District, Kelachay District, Rudsar County, Gilan Province, Iran. At the 2006 census, its population was 108, in 31 families.
