= Separdan, Siahkal =

Separdan سپردان
- Village
- Location within Iran
- Coordinates: 37°10′30″N 49°53′35″E
- Country: Iran
- Province: Gilan
- County: Siahkal
- Bakhsh: Central
- Rural District: Malfejan

Population (2006)
  - Total: 233
- Time zone: UTC+3:30 (IRST)

Sepordan (Persian: سپردان, also Romanized as Sepordān, Sepordān, and Sopordān; also known as Supurdan) is a village in Malfejan Rural District, in the Central District of Siahkal County, Gilan Province, Iran. At the 2016 census, its population was 159, in 62 families. Down from 233 people in 2006.
