= Shuleh, Chaharmahal and Bakhtiari =

Shuleh شوله
- Village
- Location within Iran
- Coordinates: 32°46′04″N 49°35′42″E
- Country: Iran
- Province: Chaharmahal and Bakhtiari
- County: Kuhrang
- Bakhsh: Bazoft
- Rural District: Bazoft

Population (2006)
  - Total: 95
- Time zone: UTC+3:30 (IRST)
  - Summer (DST): UTC+4:30 (IRDT)

Shuleh (Persian: شوله, also Romanized as Shūleh and Shooleh; also known as Shūl Ābād) is a village in Bazoft Rural District, Bazoft District, Kuhrang County, Chaharmahal and Bakhtiari Province, Iran. At the 2006 census, its population was 95, in 19 families. The village is populated by Lurs.
