= Kalayeh, Alamut-e Gharbi =

Kalayeh كلايه
- Village
- Location within Iran
- Coordinates: 36°32′09″N 50°21′03″E
- Country: Iran
- Province: Qazvin
- County: Qazvin
- Bakhsh: Alamut-e Gharbi
- Rural District: Rudbar-e Mohammad-e Zamani

Population (2006)
  - Total: 29
- Time zone: UTC+3:30 (IRST)
  - Summer (DST): UTC+4:30 (IRDT)

Kalayeh (Persian: كلايه, also Romanized as Kalāyeh) is a village in Rudbar-e Mohammad-e Zamani Rural District, Alamut-e Gharbi District, Qazvin County, Qazvin Province, Iran. At the 2006 census, its population was 29, in 9 families.
