= Mian Sara, Razavi Khorasan =

Mian Sara ميان سرا
- Village
- Location within Iran
- Coordinates: 35°09′37″N 60°25′15″E
- Country: Iran
- Province: Razavi Khorasan
- County: Torbat-e Jam
- Bakhsh: Central
- Rural District: Mian Jam

Population (2006)
  - Total: 565
- Time zone: UTC+3:30 (IRST)
  - Summer (DST): UTC+4:30 (IRDT)

Mian Sara (Persian: ميان سرا, also Romanized as Mīān Sarā) is a village in Mian Jam Rural District, in the Central District of Torbat-e Jam County, Razavi Khorasan Province, Iran. At the 2006 census, its population was 565, in 124 families.
