= Shabkhus Lat Rural District =

Rural district in Gilan province, Iran

Shabkhus Lat Rural District Persian: دهستان شبخوس لات
- Rural District
- Location within Iran
- Coordinates: 37°01′N 50°13′E
- Country: Iran
- Province: Gilan
- County: Amlash
- District: Rankuh
- Established: 1987

Population (2016)
  - Total: 8,978
- Time zone: UTC+3:30 (IRST)

Shabkhus Lat Rural District (Persian: دهستان شبخوس لات) (Note: Formerly Amlash-e Jonubi Rural District (دهستان املش جنوبي)) is in Rankuh District of Amlash County, Gilan province, in northwestern Iran. It is administered from the city of Rankuh. (Note: Formerly the village of Shabkhus Lat)

== Demographics ==
=== Population ===
At the time of the 2006 National Census, the rural district's population was 11,201 in 3,085 households. There were 9,496 inhabitants in 3,014 households at the following census of 2011. The 2016 census measured the population of the rural district as 8,978 in 3,206 households. The most populous of its 37 villages was Garkarud, with 1,443 people.

=== Other villages in the rural district ===
- Aliabad
- Asiab-e Saran
- Azarbon-e Olya
- Azarbon-e Sofla
- Bala Holu Sara
- Bazguiyeh
- Beheshtabad
- Esmail Gavabar
- Garmay Sara
- Golestan Sara
- Goshkur
- Gusht-e Pazan
- Jir Gavaber
- Jowr Gavaber
- Kohneh Guyeh-ye Bala
- Kohneh Guyeh-ye Pain
- Lar Dasar
- Lat Sara
- Latak
- Lilij Gavaber
- Pain Halu Sara
- Parvin Langeh
- Posht Darreh Lengeh
- Ramshayeh
- Rud Gavaber
- Sar Kalleh
- Shabkhus Sara
- Sivir
- Sopordan
- Sukhteh Kish
- Sur Shafilat
- Tabarzin Lengeh
- Tarom Sara
- Varkureh
- Yusefabad
