= Asak, Qorqori =

Asak اسك
- Village
- Location within Iran
- Coordinates: 31°17′02″N 61°34′51″E
- Country: Iran
- Province: Sistan and Baluchestan
- County: Hirmand
- Bakhsh: Qorqori
- Rural District: Qorqori

Population (2006)
  - Total: 191
- Time zone: UTC+3:30 (IRST)
  - Summer (DST): UTC+4:30 (IRDT)

Asak (Persian: اسك, also Romanized as Āsak and Ās-e Bād) is a village in Qorqori Rural District, Qorqori District, Hirmand County, Sistan and Baluchestan Province, Iran. At the 2006 census, its population was 191, in 42 families.
