= Asak, Hirmand =

Asak اسك
- Village
- Location within Iran
- Coordinates: 31°16′24″N 61°35′56″E
- Country: Iran
- Province: Sistan and Baluchestan
- County: Hirmand
- Bakhsh: Central
- Rural District: Margan

Population (2006)
  - Total: 108
- Time zone: UTC+3:30 (IRST)
  - Summer (DST): UTC+4:30 (IRDT)

Asak (Persian: اسك, also romanized as Āsak; also known as Ās-e Bād) is a village in Margan Rural District, in the Central District of Hirmand County, Sistan and Baluchestan Province, Iran. At the 2006 census, its population was 108, in 22 families.
