= Khomeyr Mahalleh, Langarud =

Khomeyr Mahalleh خميرمحله
- Village
- Country: Iran
- Province: Gilan
- County: Langarud
- Bakhsh: Otaqvar
- Rural District: Otaqvar

Population (2006)
  - Total: 194
- Time zone: UTC+3:30 (IRST)
  - Summer (DST): UTC+4:30 (IRDT)

Khomeyr Mahalleh (Persian: خميرمحله, also Romanized as Khomeyr Maḩalleh) is a village in Otaqvar Rural District, Otaqvar District, Langarud County, Gilan Province, Iran. At the 2006 census, its population was 194, in 50 families.
