= Lat Mahalleh, Mazandaran =

Lat Mahalleh لات محله
- Village
- Location within Iran
- Coordinates: 36°51′11″N 50°43′59″E
- Country: Iran
- Province: Mazandaran
- County: Ramsar
- Bakhsh: Central
- Rural District: Chehel Shahid

Population (2006)
  - Total: 125
- Time zone: UTC+3:30 (IRST)
  - Summer (DST): UTC+4:30 (IRDT)

Lat Mahalleh (Persian: لات محله, also Romanized as Lāt Maḩalleh) is a village in Chehel Shahid Rural District, in the Central District of Ramsar County, Mazandaran Province, Iran. At the 2006 census, its population was 125, in 35 families.
