= Chomaqestan, Rudsar =

Chomaqestan چماقستان
- Village
- Location within Iran
- Coordinates: 37°02′55″N 50°22′04″E
- Country: Iran
- Province: Gilan
- County: Rudsar
- Bakhsh: Kelachay
- Rural District: Bibalan

Population (2006)
  - Total: 153
- Time zone: UTC+3:30 (IRST)
  - Summer (DST): UTC+4:30 (IRDT)

Chomaqestan (Persian: چماقستان, also Romanized as Chomāqestān; also known as Bahār Sarā) is a village in Bibalan Rural District, Kelachay District, Rudsar County, Gilan Province, Iran. At the 2006 census, its population was 153, in 51 families.
