= Shabkhus Lat =

Shabkhus Lat شبخوس لات
- Village
- Country: Iran
- Province: Gilan
- County: Siahkal
- Bakhsh: Central
- Rural District: Tutaki

Population (2006)
  - Total: 45
- Time zone: UTC+3:30 (IRST)
  - Summer (DST): UTC+4:30 (IRDT)

Shabkhus Lat (Persian: شبخوس لات, also Romanized as Shabkhūs Lāt) is a village in Tutaki Rural District, in the Central District of Siahkal County, Gilan Province, Iran. At the 2006 census, its population was 45, in 13 families.
