= Rankuh =

City in Gilan province, Iran

Rankuh Persian: رانكوه
- City
- Location within Iran
- Coordinates: 37°03′08″N 50°14′12″E
- Country: Iran
- Province: Gilan
- County: Amlash
- District: Rankuh
- Established as a city: 2003

Population (2016)
  - Total: 2,154
- Time zone: UTC+3:30 (IRST)

Rankuh (Persian: رانكوه) (Note: Also romanized as Rānkūh; formerly the village of Shab Khush Lat (شب خوش لات)) is a city in, and the capital of, Rankuh District of Amlash County, in Gilan province, Iran. It also serves as the administrative center for Shabkhus Lat Rural District. (Note: Formerly Amlash-e Jonubi Rural District)

== History ==
In 2003, the village of Shab Khush Lat (شب خوش لات) merged with the villages of Asiab-e Saran (آسیاب سران) and Esmail Gavabar (اسماعیل گوابر) to become the city of Rankuh.

== Demographics ==
=== Population ===
At the time of the 2006 National Census, the city's population was 956 in 266 households. The following census in 2011 noted a substantial increase in population to 2,224 people in 669 households. The 2016 census measured the population of the city as 2,154 people in 749 households.
