= Amlash-e Shomali Rural District =

Rural district in Gilan province, Iran

Amlash-e Shomali Rural District Persian: دهستان املش شمالي
- Rural District
- Location within Iran
- Coordinates: 37°06′N 50°13′E
- Country: Iran
- Province: Gilan
- County: Amlash
- District: Central
- Established: 1987
- Capital: Kohneh Gurab

Population (2016)
  - Total: 7,460
- Time zone: UTC+3:30 (IRST)

Amlash-e Shomali Rural District (Persian: دهستان املش شمالي) is in the Central District of Amlash County, Gilan province, Iran. Its capital is the village of Kohneh Gurab.

== Demographics ==
=== Population ===
At the time of the 2006 National Census, the rural district's population was 8,085 in 2,466 households. There were 8,080 inhabitants in 2,666 households at the following census of 2011. The 2016 census measured the population of the rural district as 7,460 in 2,686 households. The most populous of its 25 villages was Kia Kalayeh, with 982 people.

=== Other villages in the rural district ===
- Chahar Deh
- Chalaras
- Chomaqestan
- Hoseynabad
- Karaf Mahalleh
- Karafestan
- Kharashtom
- Lakmuj
- Mashkaleh
- Ostad Kolayeh
- Surkuh
