= Amlash-e Jonubi Rural District =

Rural district in Gilan province, Iran

Amlash-e Jonubi Rural District Persian: دهستان املش جنوبي
- Rural District
- Location within Iran
- Coordinates: 37°02′N 50°09′E
- Country: Iran
- Province: Gilan
- County: Amlash
- District: Central
- Established: 1994
- Capital: Hajjiabad

Population (2016)
  - Total: 5,517
- Time zone: UTC+3:30 (IRST)

Amlash-e Jonubi Rural District (Persian: دهستان املش جنوبي) is in the Central District of Amlash County, Gilan province, Iran. Its capital is the village of Hajjiabad.

== Demographics ==
=== Population ===
At the time of the 2006 National Census, the rural district's population was 6,584 in 1,787 households. There were 5,887 inhabitants in 1,866 households at the following census of 2011. The 2016 census measured the population of the rural district as 5,517 in 1,995 households. The most populous of its 44 villages was Hajjiabad, with 545 people.

=== Other villages in the rural district ===
- Bagh Mahalleh-ye Narakeh
- Bala Mahalleh-ye Narakeh
- Davay-e Lat
- Har Do Ab
- Kash Kalayeh
- Lalim
- Pain Mahalleh-ye Narakeh
- Shandar-e Balnageh
- Shisharestan
- Tabestan Neshin
