= Central District (Amlash County) =

District in Gilan province, Iran

Central District (Amlash County) Persian: بخش مرکزی شهرستان املش
- District
- Location within Iran
- Coordinates: 37°03′N 50°10′E
- Country: Iran
- Province: Gilan
- County: Amlash
- Established: 1997
- Capital: Amlash

Population (2016)
  - Total: 28,421
- Time zone: UTC+3:30 (IRST)

The Central District of Amlash County (Persian: بخش مرکزی شهرستان املش) is in Gilan province, Iran. Its capital is the city of Amlash.

== Demographics ==
=== Population ===
At the time of the 2006 National Census, the district's population was 29,716 in 8,603 households. The following census in 2011 counted 28,882 people in 9,250 households. The 2016 census measured the population of the district as 28,421 inhabitants in 9,949 households.

=== Administrative divisions ===
Central District (Amlash County) Population
Administrative Divisions	2006	2011	2016
Amlash-e Jonubi RD	6,584	5,887	5,517
Amlash-e Shomali RD	8,085	8,080	7,460
Amlash (city)	15,047	14,915	15,444
Total	29,716	28,882	28,421
RD = Rural District
