= Rankuh District =

District in Gilan province, Iran

Rankuh District Persian: بخش رانکوه
- District
- Location within Iran
- Coordinates: 36°56′N 50°09′E
- Country: Iran
- Province: Gilan
- County: Amlash
- Established: 1997
- Capital: Rankuh

Population (2016)
  - Total: 14,804
- Time zone: UTC+3:30 (IRST)

Rankuh District (Persian: بخش رانکوه) is in Amlash County, Gilan province, in northwestern Iran. Its capital is the city of Rankuh. (Note: Formerly the village of Shab Khush Lat)

== Demographics ==
=== Population ===
At the time of the 2006 National Census, the district's population was 16,392 in 4,619 households. The following census in 2011 counted 15,379 people in 4,947 households. The 2016 census measured the population of the district as 14,804 inhabitants in 5,357 households.

=== Administrative divisions ===
Rankuh District Population
Administrative Divisions	2006	2011	2016
Kojid RD	903	841	879
Shabkhus Lat RD (Note: Formerly Amlash-e Jonubi Rural District)	11,201	9,496	8,978
Somam RD	3,332	2,818	2,793
Rankuh (city)	956	2,224	2,154
Total	16,392	15,379	14,804
RD = Rural District
