= Amlash County =

County in Gilan province, Iran

Amlash County Persian: شهرستان املش
- County
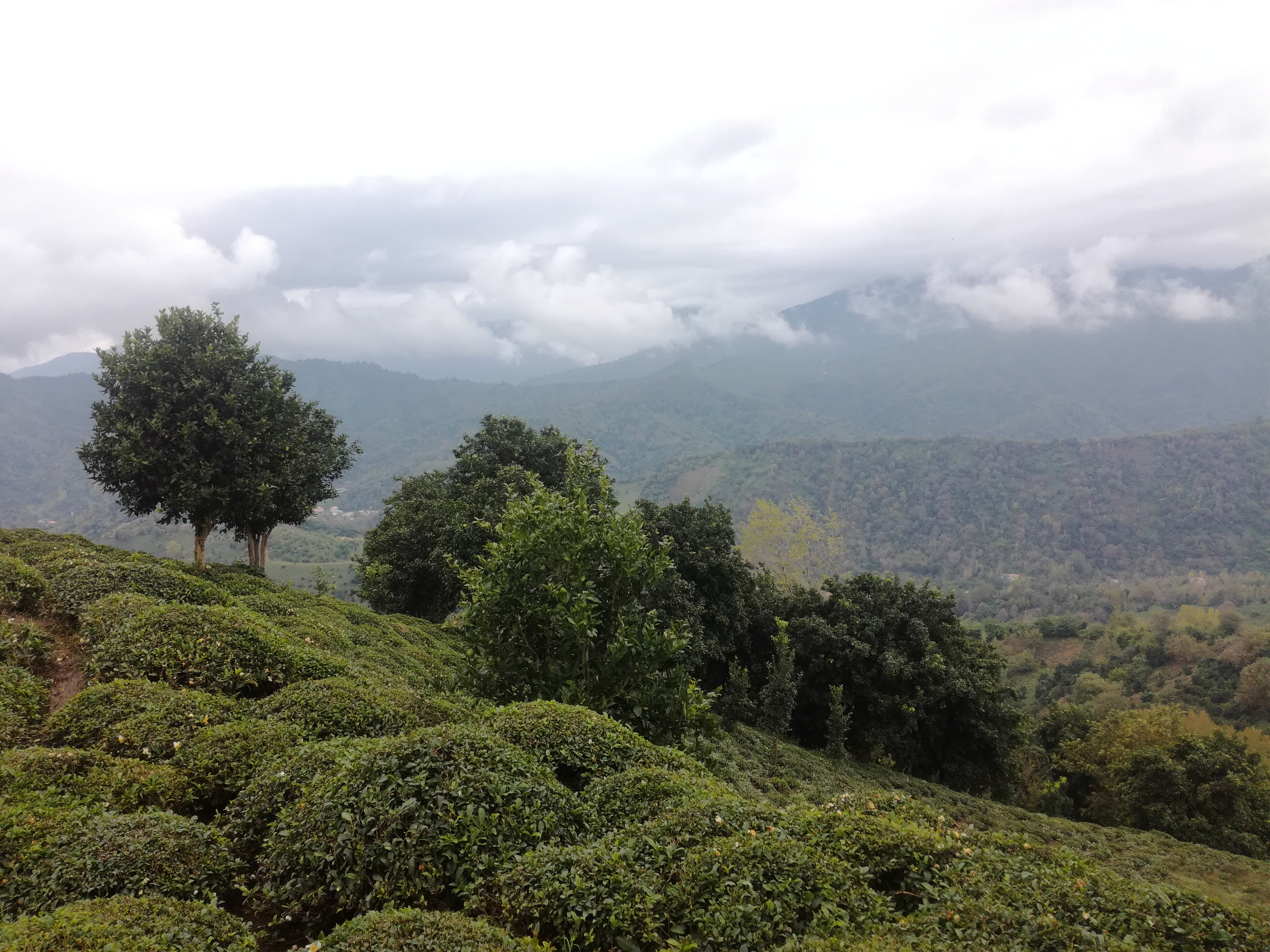
- Landscape near the village of Tabestan Neshin

- Location of Amlash County in Gilan province (right, pink)

- Location of Gilan province in Iran
- Coordinates: 36°58′N 50°11′E
- Country: Iran
- Province: Gilan
- Established: 1997
- Capital: Amlash
- Districts: Central, Rankuh

Population (2016)
  - Total: 43,225
- Time zone: UTC+3:30 (IRST)

Amlash County (Persian: شهرستان املش) is in Gilan province, in northwestern Iran. Its capital is the city of Amlash.

== History ==
The name of the village Buyeh in this county is attributed to the Buyid dynasty of the 10th & 11th century which ruled over much of Iran and most of Iraq. The founders like that of Imad al-Dawla were ethnically Daylamite in origin.

== Demographics ==
=== Language ===
It is a majority Gilaki-speaking county entirely.

== Population ==
At the time of the 2006 National Census, the county's population was 46,108 in 13,222 households. The following census in 2011 counted 44,261 people in 14,191 households. The 2016 census measured the population of the county as of 43,225 in 15,306 households.

== Administrative divisions ==
Amlash County's population history and administrative structure over three consecutive censuses are shown in the following table.

Amlash County Population
Administrative Divisions	2006	2011	2016
Central District	29,716	28,882	28,421
Amlash-e Jonubi RD	6,584	5,887	5,517
Amlash-e Shomali RD	8,085	8,080	7,460
Amlash (city)	15,047	14,915	15,444
Rankuh District	16,392	15,379	14,804
Kojid RD	903	841	879
Shabkhus Lat RD (Note: Formerly Amlash-e Jonubi Rural District)	11,201	9,496	8,978
Somam RD	3,332	2,818	2,793
Rankuh (city) (Note: Formerly the village of Shab Khush Lat)	956	2,224	2,154
Total	46,108	44,261	43,225
RD = Rural District

== See also ==
Media related to Amlash County at Wikimedia Commons
