= Lima (disambiguation) =

Lima is the capital of Peru.

Lima or LIMA may also refer to:

== Places ==
=== Argentina ===
- Lima, Buenos Aires, in Zárate Partido

=== Honduras ===
- La Lima, in Cortés department, Honduras

=== Italy ===
- Lima (river), a tributary of the Serchio in Tuscany

=== Iran ===
- Lima, Iran, in Gilan Province
- Lima Chal, in Gilan Province
- Lima Gavabar, in Gilan Province

=== Paraguay ===
- Lima District, Paraguay

=== Peru ===
- Lima Region, a political region of Peru
- Lima Province, a province of Peru
- Lima District, the downtown district of Lima, Peru
- Cercado de Lima, the core of the city's downtown district
- Historic Centre of Lima, the protected zone of the aforementioned area

=== Philippines ===
- Lima Technology Center, a mixed-use development in Batangas, Philippines

=== Portugal ===
- Lima, a designated wine region in the Vinho Verde region

=== Sweden ===
- Lima, Sweden

=== United States ===
- Lima, Illinois
- Lima, Indiana, the original name of Howe, Indiana
- Lima Township, Michigan
  - Lima Center, Michigan, an unincorporated community
- Lima, Montana
- Lima (town), New York
- Lima (village), New York
- Lima, Ohio, the largest US city named Lima
- North Lima, Ohio
- Lima, Pennsylvania
- Lima, Wisconsin (disambiguation), multiple places
- West Lima, Wisconsin
- Lima, Oklahoma

=== Zambia ===
- Lima (constituency), a constituency of Lusaka District

== Facilities and structures ==
- Lima (Buenos Aires Metro), a metro station
- Lima Stadium, listed on the National Register of Historic Places
- Long Island MacArthur Airport, an airport in Long Island, New York, initialized LIMA

== Biology ==
- Lima bean, a vegetable
- Lima (bivalve), a genus of bivalve molluscs
- Left internal mammary artery, often used in coronary artery bypass surgery

== Companies and organizations ==
- Lima (models), an Italian brand of model railways
- Lima (restaurant), London, UK; a Peruvian cuisine restaurant
- Lima Locomotive Works

== People and characters ==
- Lima culture, a pre-Incan civilization that existed in modern-day Peru
- Lima, a minor Roman goddess of doorways; see indigitamenta
- Lima (surname)
- Lima (actress), Bangladeshi film actress
- Lima (footballer, born 1942) (1942–2025), Antônio Lima dos Santos, Brazilian football defender
- Lima (footballer, born 1944), Eduardo Teixeira Lima, Brazilian football winger
- Lima (footballer, born 1962), Adesvaldo José de Lima, Brazilian football forward
- Lima (footballer, born 1981), Aparecido Francisco de Lima, Brazilian football striker
- Lima (footballer, born 1982), João Maria Lima do Nascimento, Brazilian football forward
- Lima (footballer, born 1983), Rodrigo José Lima dos Santos, Brazilian football striker
- Lima (footballer, born 1986), Éverson Alan da Lima, Brazilian football defender
- Lima (footballer, born 1999), Guilherme Natan de Lima, Brazilian football midfielder

== Ships ==
- Lima (1846 ship)
- NRP Lima, a ship of the Portuguese Navy
- Peruvian cruiser Lima

== Other uses ==
- Lima Mudlib, an online game software framework
- Lima Syndrome, opposite of Stockholm Syndrome
- Langkawi International Maritime and Aerospace Exhibition, initialized LIMA, a biennial showcase event in Malaysia
- The letter L in the NATO phonetic alphabet
- The number five in Austronesian languages
- Lima, the code name for an Athlon 64 CPU core

== See also ==
- Lima and Callao Metropolitan Area
- Lima y Callao
