= Baldeh =

Baldeh may refer to:

== Places ==
- Baldeh Sara, a village in Rahimabad Rural District, Rahimabad District, Rudsar County, Gilan Province, Iran

== People ==
- Buba Baldeh (1953-2014), Gambian politician
- Fatou Baldeh (born 1983), Gambian women's rights activist
- Samba Baldeh (born 1971), politician
