= Koshkuh =

Koshkuh or Kashkuh (Persian: كشكوه) may refer to:

- Koshkuh, Fars
- Koshkuh, Lamerd, Fars Province
- Kashkuh, Gilan

== See also ==
- Kushkuh
