= Soluk Bon =

Soluk Bon or Solukbon (Persian: سلوكبن) may refer to:

- Soluk Bon-e Olya
- Soluk Bon-e Sofla
- Soluk Bon-e Vosta
