= Aghuzbon =

Aghuzbon or Aghoozbon or Aghowzbon (Persian: اغوزبن) may refer to:

- Aghuzbon, Rudbar, Gilan Province
- Aghuzbon Kand Sar, Rudsar County, Gilan Province
- Aghuzbon, Siahkal, Gilan Province
- Aghuzbon, Amol, Mazandaran Province
- Aghuzbon, Babol, Mazandaran Province
- Aghuzbon, Savadkuh, Mazandaran Province
