= Mayestan =

Mayestan (Persian: مايستان) may refer to:

- Mayestan-e Bala
- Mayestan-e Pain
