= Arbu Sara =

Arbu Sara اربوسرا
- Village
- Location within Iran
- Coordinates: 37°00′38″N 50°21′32″E
- Country: Iran
- Province: Gilan
- County: Rudsar
- Bakhsh: Rahimabad
- Rural District: Rahimabad

Population (2006)
  - Total: 132
- Time zone: UTC+3:30 (IRST)
  - Summer (DST): UTC+4:30 (IRDT)

Arbu Sara (Persian: اربوسرا, also Romanized as Arbū Sarā) is a village in Rahimabad Rural District, Rahimabad District, Rudsar County, Gilan Province, Iran. At the 2006 census, its population was 132, in 34 families.
