= Khurtab Sara =

Khurtab Sara خورتابسرا
- Village
- Location within Iran
- Coordinates: 37°00′08″N 50°21′17″E
- Country: Iran
- Province: Gilan
- County: Rudsar
- Bakhsh: Rahimabad
- Rural District: Rahimabad

Population (2006)
  - Total: 30
- Time zone: UTC+3:30 (IRST)
  - Summer (DST): UTC+4:30 (IRDT)

Khurtab Sara (Persian: خورتابسرا, also Romanized as Khūrtāb Sarā) is a village in Rahimabad Rural District, Rahimabad District, Rudsar County, Gilan Province, Iran. At the 2006 census, its population was 30, in 10 families.
