= Datur-e Sar =

Datur-e sar دتورسر
- Village
- Country: Iran
- Province: Gilan
- County: Rudsar
- Bakhsh: Rahimabad
- Rural District: Shuil

Population (2006)
  - Total: 40
- Time zone: UTC+3:30 (IRST)
  - Summer (DST): UTC+4:30 (IRDT)

Datur-e sar (Persian: دتورسر, Gilaki: دتۊر ٚ سر) is a village in Shuil Rural District, Rahimabad District, Rudsar County, Gilan Province, Iran. At the 2006 census, its population was 40, in 11 families.
