= Fabil Sara =

Fabil Sara فبيل سرا
- Village
- Location within Iran
- Coordinates: 37°00′47″N 50°22′01″E
- Country: Iran
- Province: Gilan
- County: Rudsar
- Bakhsh: Rahimabad
- Rural District: Rahimabad

Population (2006)
  - Total: 158
- Time zone: UTC+3:30 (IRST)
  - Summer (DST): UTC+4:30 (IRDT)

Fabil Sara (Persian: فبيل سرا, also Romanized as Fabīl Sarā; also known as Fabīl Sar) is a village in Rahimabad Rural District, Rahimabad District, Rudsar County, Gilan Province, Iran. At the 2006 census, its population was 158, in 41 families.
