= Dimabon =

Dimabon ديمابن
- Village
- Location within Iran
- Coordinates: 36°57′08″N 50°16′16″E
- Country: Iran
- Province: Gilan
- County: Rudsar
- Bakhsh: Rahimabad
- Rural District: Rahimabad

Population (2006)
  - Total: 59
- Time zone: UTC+3:30 (IRST)
  - Summer (DST): UTC+4:30 (IRDT)

Dimabon (Persian: ديمابن, also Romanized as Dīmābon) is a village in Rahimabad Rural District, Rahimabad District, Rudsar County, Gilan Province, Iran. At the 2006 census, its population was 59, in 19 families.
