= Abdu Chal =

Abdu Chal ابدوچال
- Village
- Location within Iran
- Coordinates: 36°48′40″N 50°15′14″E
- Country: Iran
- Province: Gilan
- County: Rudsar
- Bakhsh: Rahimabad
- Rural District: Eshkevar-e Sofla

Population (2006)
  - Total: 27
- Time zone: UTC+3:30 (IRST)
  - Summer (DST): UTC+4:30 (IRDT)

Abdu Chal (Persian: ابدوچال, Gilaki: آودبۊچال, romanized: Aw dabu Chal, also Romanized as Ābdū Chāl) is a village in Eshkevar-e Sofla Rural District, Rahimabad District, Rudsar County, Gilan Province, Iran. At the 2006 census, its population was 27, in 8 families.
