= Talabon =

Talabon تلابن
- Village
- Location within Iran
- Coordinates: 36°45′17″N 50°18′16″E
- Country: Iran
- Province: Gilan
- County: Rudsar
- Bakhsh: Rahimabad
- Rural District: Siyarastaq Yeylaq

Population (2006)
  - Total: 31
- Time zone: UTC+3:30 (IRST)
  - Summer (DST): UTC+4:30 (IRDT)

Talabon (Persian: تلابن, also Romanized as Talābon) is a village in Siyarastaq Yeylaq Rural District, Rahimabad District, Rudsar County, Gilan Province, Iran. At the 2006 census, its population was 31, in 11 families.
