= Hasni Kuh =

Hasni Kuh حسني كوه
- Village
- Location within Iran
- Coordinates: 36°45′51″N 50°12′51″E
- Country: Iran
- Province: Gilan
- County: Rudsar
- Bakhsh: Rahimabad
- Rural District: Shuil

Population (2006)
  - Total: 18
- Time zone: UTC+3:30 (IRST)
  - Summer (DST): UTC+4:30 (IRDT)

Hasni Kuh (Persian: حسني كوه, also Romanized as Ḩasnī Kūh; also known as Ḩasī Kūh) is a village in Shuil Rural District, Rahimabad District, Rudsar County, Gilan Province, Iran. At the 2006 census, its population was 18, in 5 families.
