= Bazneshin =

Bazneshin (Persian: بازنشين) may refer to:

- Bazneshin-e Olya
- Bazneshin-e Sofla
