= Lam Beshkest =

Lam Beshkest (Persian: لام بشكست) may refer to:

- Bala Lam Beshkest
- Lam Beshkest-e Pain
