= Benek Sar =

Benek Sar بنكسر
- Village
- Location within Iran
- Coordinates: 37°00′24″N 50°18′18″E
- Country: Iran
- Province: Gilan
- County: Rudsar
- Bakhsh: Rahimabad
- Rural District: Rahimabad

Population (2016)
  - Total: 144
- Time zone: UTC+3:30 (IRST)

Benek Sar (Persian: بنكسر, also Romanized as Boneksar) is a village in Rahimabad Rural District, Rahimabad District, Rudsar County, Gilan Province, Iran. At the 2016 census, its population was 144, in 53 families. Down from 194 people in 2006.
