= Chamtu =

Chamtu چمتو
- Village
- Location within Iran
- Coordinates: 36°45′28″N 50°13′31″E
- Country: Iran
- Province: Gilan
- County: Rudsar
- Bakhsh: Rahimabad
- Rural District: Shuil

Population (2006)
  - Total: 52
- Time zone: UTC+3:30 (IRST)
  - Summer (DST): UTC+4:30 (IRDT)

Chamtu (Persian: چمتو, also Romanized as Chamtū) is a village in Shuil Rural District, Rahimabad District, Rudsar County, Gilan Province, Iran. At the 2006 census, its population was 52, in 13 families.
