= Liasi =

Liasi لياسی
- Village
- Location within Iran
- Coordinates: 36°43′54″N 50°22′04″E
- Country: Iran
- Province: Gilan
- County: Rudsar
- Bakhsh: Rahimabad
- Rural District: Siyarastaq Yeylaq

Population (2006)
  - Total: 74
- Time zone: UTC+3:30 (IRST)
  - Summer (DST): UTC+4:30 (IRDT)

Liasi (Persian: لياسی, also Romanized as Līāsī) is a village in Siyarastaq Yeylaq Rural District, Rahimabad District, Rudsar County, Gilan Province, Iran. At the 2006 census, its population was 74, in 31 families.
