= Valani =

Valani ولنی
- Village
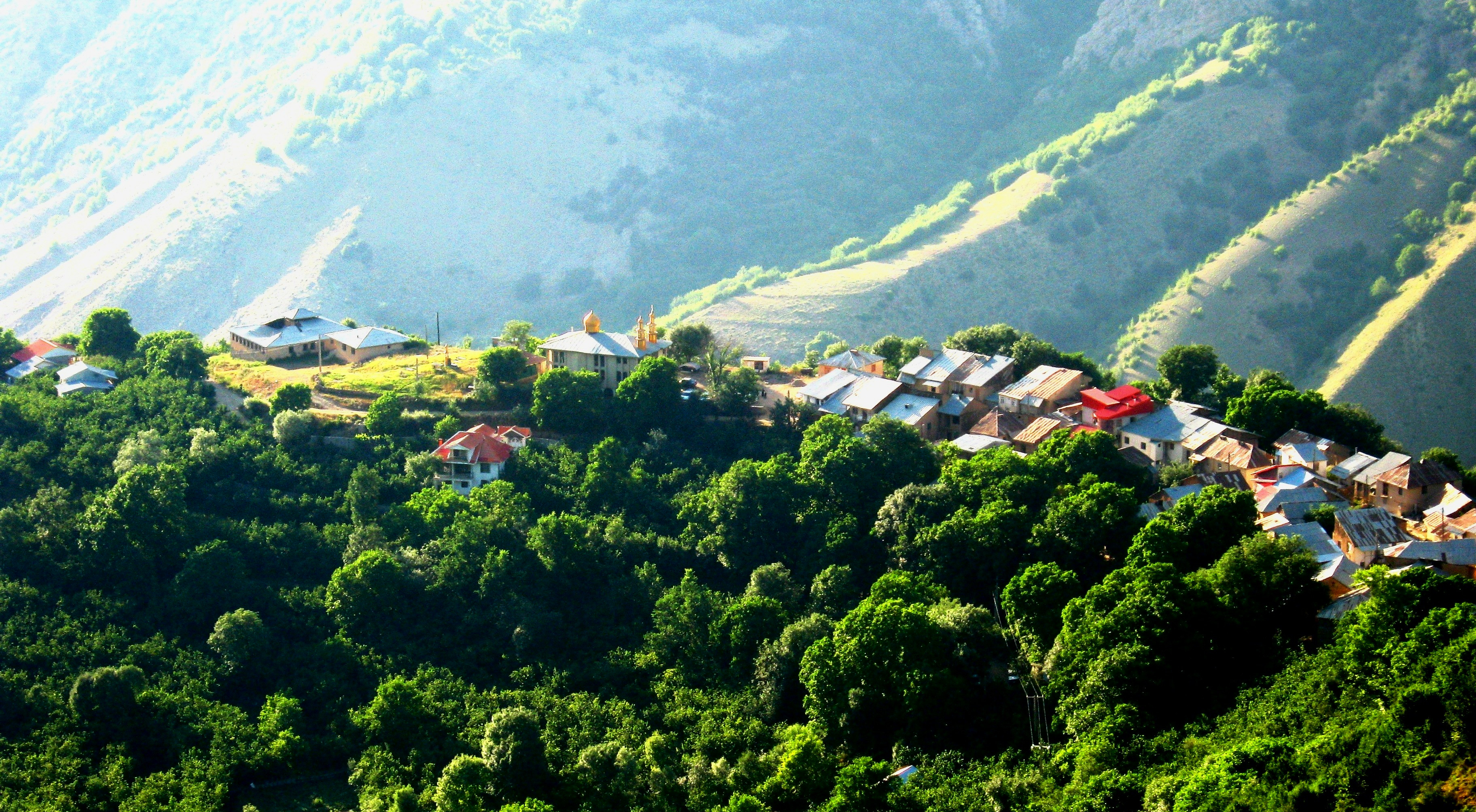

- Location within Iran
- Coordinates: 36°43′58″N 50°20′54″E
- Country: Iran
- Province: Gilan
- County: Rudsar
- Bakhsh: Rahimabad
- Rural District: Eshkevar-e Olya and Siyarastaq Yeylaq

Population (2016)
  - Total: 68
- Time zone: UTC+3:30 (IRST)

Valani (Persian: ولنی, also Romanized as Valanī) is a village in Eshkevar-e Olya Rural District, Rahimabad District, Rudsar County, Gilan Province, Iran. It is a mountainous village with a cold climate, 58 km (36 mi) south of Rudsar.

== Demographics ==
People of Valani speak the Gilaki language and their religion is Shia Islam. People of the village has been active in farming, scarf weaving, and Animal husbandry. Valani's agricultural products include honey, grain, Hazelnut and dairy.

At the 2016 census, its population was 68, in 30 families. Increased from 29 people in 2006.

Valani Population history
Year	Pop.	±%
1949	300	—
1966	248	−17.3%
1976	206	−16.9%
1986	151	−26.7%
2006	29	−80.8%
2011	11	−62.1%
2016	60	+445.5%
