= Lilaki =

Lilaki ليلكي
- Village
- Location within Iran
- Coordinates: 36°50′00″N 50°13′00″E
- Country: Iran
- Province: Gilan
- County: Rudsar
- Bakhsh: Rahimabad
- Rural District: Shuil

Population (2006)
  - Total: 10
- Time zone: UTC+3:30 (IRST)
  - Summer (DST): UTC+4:30 (IRDT)

Lilaki (Persian: ليلكي, also Romanized as Līlakī; also known as Lailaki, Loolaki, and Lūlakī) is a village in Shuil Rural District, Rahimabad District, Rudsar County, Gilan Province, Iran. At the 2006 census, its population was 10, in 4 families.
