= Guzeh Lengeh =

Guzeh Lengeh گوزه لنگه
- Village
- Location within Iran
- Coordinates: 36°56′15″N 50°15′42″E
- Country: Iran
- Province: Gilan
- County: Rudsar
- Bakhsh: Rahimabad
- Rural District: Rahimabad

Population (2006)
  - Total: 37
- Time zone: UTC+3:30 (IRST)
  - Summer (DST): UTC+4:30 (IRDT)

Guzeh Lengeh (Persian: گوزه لنگه, also Romanized as Gūzeh Lengeh; also known as Gūzal Lengeh) is a village in Rahimabad Rural District, Rahimabad District, Rudsar County, Gilan Province, Iran. At the 2006 census, its population was 37, in 8 families.
