= Razeh Gardan =

Razeh Gardan رزه گردن
- Village
- Location within Iran
- Coordinates: 36°51′27″N 50°10′11″E
- Country: Iran
- Province: Gilan
- County: Rudsar
- Bakhsh: Rahimabad
- Rural District: Eshkevar-e Sofla

Population (2006)
  - Total: 110
- Time zone: UTC+3:30 (IRST)
  - Summer (DST): UTC+4:30 (IRDT)

Razeh Gardan (Persian: رزه گردن; also known as Razgardan and Razkardan) is a village in Eshkevar-e Sofla Rural District, Rahimabad District, Rudsar County, Gilan Province, Iran. At the 2006 census, its population was 110, in 28 families.
