= Alima (disambiguation) =

Alima is a tributary of the Congo River, Africa.

Alima may also refer to:

- Alima (given name), female given name
- Alima (crustacean), genus of shrimps belonging to the family Squillidae

== See also ==
- Lima (disambiguation)
