= Niasan =

Niasan نياسن
- Village
- Location within Iran
- Coordinates: 36°43′53″N 50°18′24″E
- Country: Iran
- Province: Gilan
- County: Rudsar
- Bakhsh: Rahimabad
- Rural District: Siyarastaq Yeylaq

Population (2006)
  - Total: 93
- Time zone: UTC+3:30 (IRST)
  - Summer (DST): UTC+4:30 (IRDT)

Niasan (Persian: نياسن, also Romanized as Nīāsan and Nīāsān; also known as Nīāsīn) is a village in Siyarastaq Yeylaq Rural District, Rahimabad District, Rudsar County, Gilan Province, Iran. At the 2006 census, its population was 93, in 27 families.
