= Karbas Saray =

Karbas Saray (Persian: كرباس سراي), also rendered as Karbas Sara, may refer to:

- Karbas Saray-e Olya
- Karbas Saray-e Sofla
