= Lasbu, Rahimabad =

Village in Gilan province, Iran

Lasbu Persian: لسبو
- Village
- Location within Iran
- Coordinates: 36°43′35″N 50°13′31″E
- Country: Iran
- Province: Gilan
- County: Rudsar
- District: Rahimabad
- Rural District: Shuil

Population (2016)
  - Total: 153
- Time zone: UTC+3:30 (IRST)

Lasbu (Persian: لسبو) (Note: Also romanized as Lasboo and Lasbū) is a village in Shuil Rural District of Rahimabad District in Rudsar County, Gilan province, Iran.

== Demographics ==
=== Population ===
At the time of the 2006 National Census, the village's population was 159 in 41 households. The following census in 2011 counted 92 people in 35 households. The 2016 census measured the population of the village as 153 people in 56 households.
