= Tul Lat =

Village in Gilan province, Iran

Tul Lat Persian: طول لات
- Village
- Location within Iran
- Coordinates: 36°59′34″N 50°17′35″E
- Country: Iran
- Province: Gilan
- County: Rudsar
- District: Rahimabad
- Rural District: Rahimabad

Population (2016)
  - Total: 1,027
- Time zone: UTC+3:30 (IRST)

Tul Lat (Persian: طول لات) (Note: Also romanized as Ţūl Lāt; also known as Ţūleh Lāt-e Āzār Key) is a village in, and the capital of, Rahimabad Rural District in Rahimabad District of Rudsar County, Gilan province, Iran.

== Demographics ==
=== Population ===
At the time of the 2006 National Census, the village's population was 841 in 214 households. The following census in 2011 counted 944 people in 270 households. The 2016 census measured the population of the village as 1,027 people in 322 households. It was the most populous village in its rural district.
