= Sheram Dasht =

Village in Gilan province, Iran

Sheram Dasht Persian: شرمدشت
- Village
- Location within Iran
- Coordinates: 36°53′44″N 50°09′45″E
- Country: Iran
- Province: Gilan
- County: Rudsar
- District: Rahimabad
- Rural District: Shuil

Population (2016)
  - Total: 107
- Time zone: UTC+3:30 (IRST)

Sheram Dasht (Persian: شرمدشت) is a village in Shuil Rural District of Rahimabad District in Rudsar County, Gilan province, Iran.

== Demographics ==
=== Population ===
At the time of the 2006 National Census, the village's population was 76 in 21 households. The following census in 2011 counted 36 people in 12 households. The 2016 census measured the population of the village as 107 people in 36 households.
