= Lam Beshkest-e Pain =

Lam Beshkest-e Pain لام بشكست پائين
- Village
- Location within Iran
- Coordinates: 36°55′09″N 50°12′09″E
- Country: Iran
- Province: Gilan
- County: Rudsar
- Bakhsh: Rahimabad
- Rural District: Eshkevar-e Sofla

Population (2006)
  - Total: 95
- Time zone: UTC+3:30 (IRST)
  - Summer (DST): UTC+4:30 (IRDT)

Lam Beshkest-e Pain (Persian: لام بشكست پائين, also Romanized as Lām Beshkest-e Pā’īn) is a village in Eshkevar-e Sofla Rural District, Rahimabad District, Rudsar County, Gilan Province, Iran. At the 2006 census, its population was 95, in 28 families.
