= William T. Agerter =

American industrialist

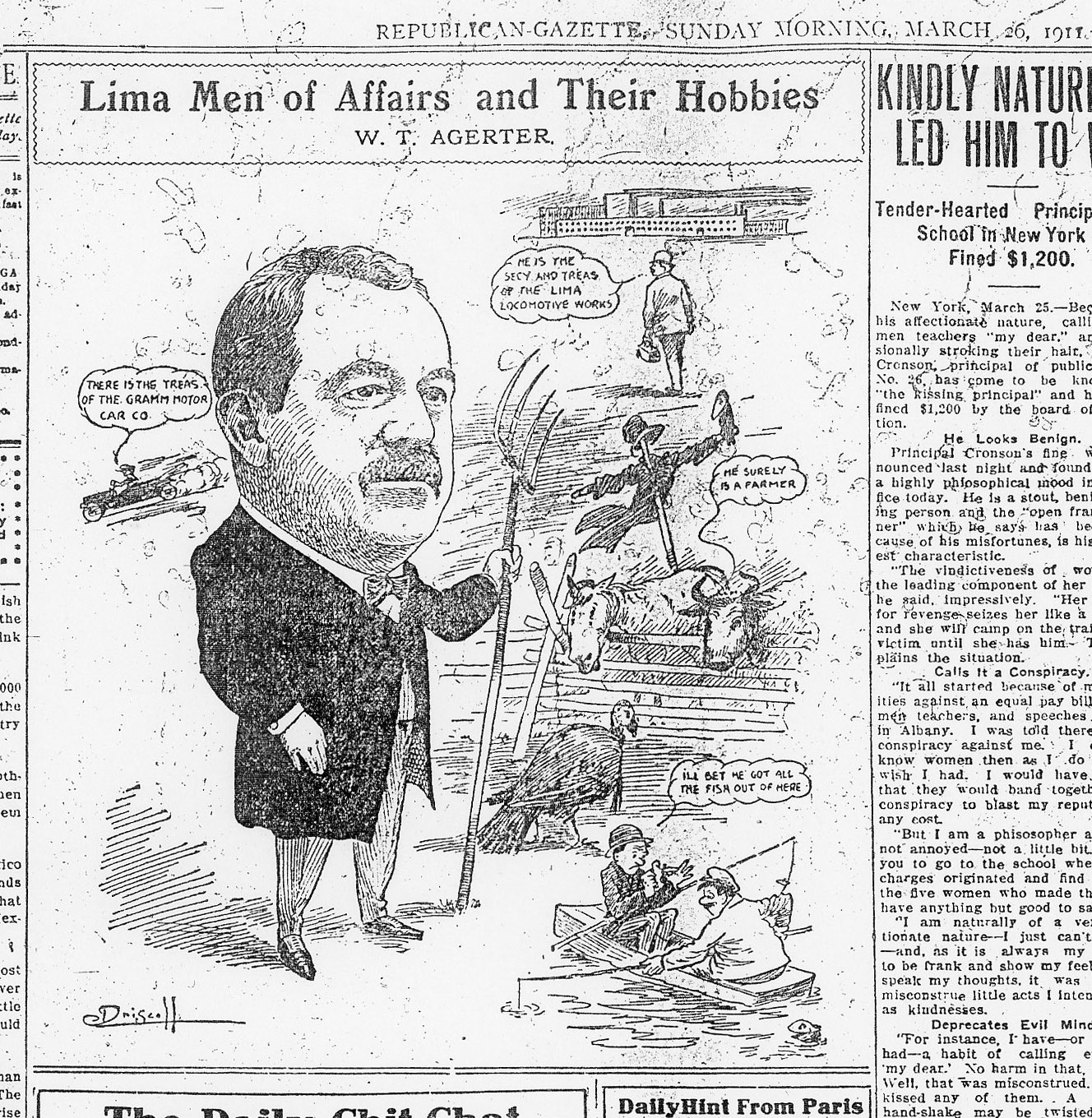
1911 cartoon showing various business and recreational roles held by William T. Agerter, Lima businessman

William T. Agerter (1859–1944) was an industrialist in Lima, Ohio, and an executive of the Lima Locomotive Works.

== Biography ==
Agerter was born in 1859, in Upper Sandusky, Ohio, US. In recognition of his family's Swiss heritage, he was named William Tell Agerter after the Swiss national hero. He came to Lima in 1880 and worked at the Lima Locomotive Works, which was founded by his uncle Frederck Agerter and several others in 1869. He eventually achieved the position of secretary and treasurer of the Lima Locomotive Works, a position that he held for many years.

Agerter served in various positions of leadership in business and the community in Lima. In 1907, he and five other Lima industrialists founded the Ohio Steel Foundry. He was treasurer of the Gramm Motor Car Company, secretary-treasurer of the Woodlawn Cemetery Association, and in 1909 he, along with eight other Native American artifacts enthusiasts, was a charter member of the Allen County Historical Society. He was president of the Allen County Fair Board and was also the owner of the Glen Oak farm, a large estate near Spencerville, Ohio.
