= Pi Aghuzbon =

Village in Gilan province, Iran

Pi Aghuzbon Persian: پي اغوزبن
- Village
- Location within Iran
- Coordinates: 36°44′24″N 50°15′36″E
- Country: Iran
- Province: Gilan
- County: Rudsar
- District: Rahimabad
- Rural District: Shuil

Population (2016)
  - Total: 184
- Time zone: UTC+3:30 (IRST)

Pi Aghuzbon (Persian: پي اغوزبن) (Note: Also romanized as Pī Āghūzbon, Piaghuzbon, and Pīāghūzbon) is a village in Shuil Rural District of Rahimabad District in Rudsar County, Gilan province, Iran.

== Demographics ==
=== Population ===
At the time of the 2006 National Census, the village's population was 154 in 46 households. The following census in 2011 counted 84 people in 35 households. The 2016 census measured the population of the village as 184 people in 64 households.
