= Shafiabad, Gilan =

Village in Gilan province, Iran

Shafiabad Persian: شفيع اباد
- Village
- Location within Iran
- Coordinates: 36°44′41″N 50°14′56″E
- Country: Iran
- Province: Gilan
- County: Rudsar
- District: Rahimabad
- Rural District: Shuil

Population (2016)
  - Total: 190
- Time zone: UTC+3:30 (IRST)

Shafiabad (Persian: شفيع اباد) (Note: Also romanized as Shafī‘ābād) is a village in Shuil Rural District of Rahimabad District in Rudsar County, Gilan province, Iran.

== Demographics ==
=== Population ===
At the time of the 2006 National Census, the village's population was 99 in 36 households. The following census in 2011 counted 115 people in 53 households. The 2016 census measured the population of the village as 190 people in 72 households.
