= Azar Key =

Village in Gilan province, Iran

Azar Key Persian: آزارکی
- Village
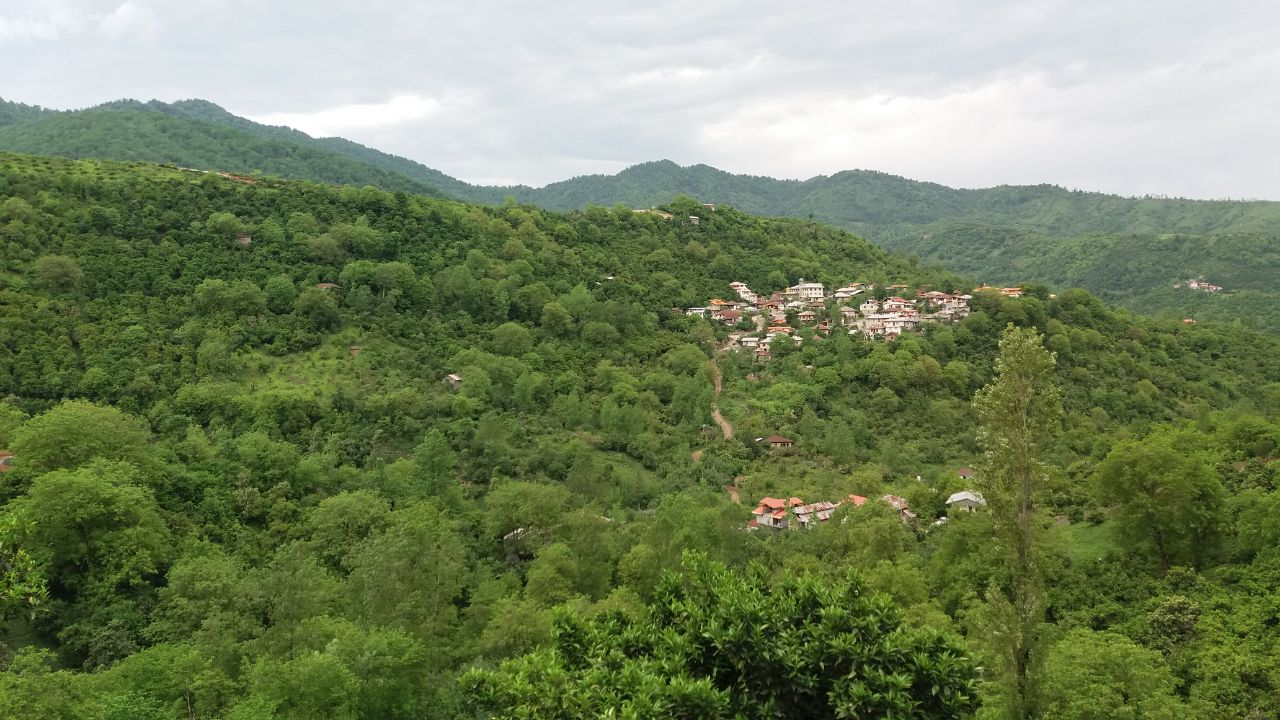
- The village of Azar Key

- Location within Iran
- Coordinates: 36°59′03″N 50°17′30″E
- Country: Iran
- Province: Gilan
- County: Rudsar
- District: Rahimabad
- Rural District: Rahimabad

Population (2016)
  - Total: 308
- Time zone: UTC+3:30 (IRST)

Azar Key (Persian: آزارکی) (Note: Also romanized as Āzār Key) is a village in Rahimabad Rural District of Rahimabad District in Rudsar County, Gilan province, Iran.

== Demographics ==
=== Population ===
At the time of the 2006 National Census, the village's population was 345 in 75 households. The following census in 2011 counted 359 people in 101 households. The 2016 census measured the population of the village as 308 people in 107 households.
