= Siyarastaq =

Village in Gilan province, Iran

Siyarastaq Persian: سيارستاق
- Village
- Location within Iran
- Coordinates: 36°44′26″N 50°18′21″E
- Country: Iran
- Province: Gilan
- County: Rudsar
- District: Rahimabad
- Rural District: Eshkevar-e Olya and Siyarastaq Yeylaq

Population (2016)
  - Total: 151
- Time zone: UTC+3:30 (IRST)

Siyarastaq (Persian: سيارستاق) (Note: Also romanized as Siarastaq, Sīārastāq, and Sīyārastāq) is a village in Eshkevar-e Olya and Siyarastaq Yeylaq Rural District (Note: Formerly Siyarastaq Yeylaq Rural District) of Rahimabad District in Rudsar County, Gilan province, Iran.

== Demographics ==
=== Population ===
At the time of the 2006 National Census, the village's population was 139 in 37 households. The following census in 2011 counted 98 people in 31 households. The 2016 census measured the population of the village as 151 people in 51 households.
