= Khorasan Poshteh =

Village in Gilan province, Iran

Khorasan Poshteh Persian: خراسان پشته
- Village
- Location within Iran
- Coordinates: 36°53′20″N 50°09′35″E
- Country: Iran
- Province: Gilan
- County: Rudsar
- District: Rahimabad
- Rural District: Eshkevar-e Sofla

Population (2016)
  - Total: 211
- Time zone: UTC+3:30 (IRST)

Khorasan Poshteh (Persian: خراسان پشته) (Note: Also romanized as Khorāsān Poshteh) is a village in Eshkevar-e Sofla Rural District of Rahimabad District in Rudsar County, Gilan province, Iran.

== Demographics ==
=== Population ===
At the time of the 2006 National Census, the village's population was 226 in 62 households. The following census in 2011 counted 201 people in 73 households. The 2016 census measured the population of the village as 211 people in 74 households.
