= Lima Gavabar =

Lima Gavabar ليماگوابر
- Village
- Location within Iran
- Coordinates: 36°50′44″N 50°14′07″E
- Country: Iran
- Province: Gilan
- County: Rudsar
- Bakhsh: Rahimabad
- Rural District: Eshkevar-e Sofla

Population (2006)
  - Total: 63
- Time zone: UTC+3:30 (IRST)
  - Summer (DST): UTC+4:30 (IRDT)

Lima Gavabar (Persian: ليماگوابر, also Romanized as Līmā Gavābar; also known as Līmā Gūr) is a village in Eshkevar-e Sofla Rural District, Rahimabad District, Rudsar County, Gilan Province, Iran. At the 2006 census, its population was 63, in 26 families.
