= Soluk Bon-e Olya =

Soluk Bon-e Olya سلوكبن عليا
- Village
- Location within Iran
- Coordinates: 36°49′16″N 50°14′03″E
- Country: Iran
- Province: Gilan
- County: Rudsar
- Bakhsh: Rahimabad
- Rural District: Shuil

Population (2006)
  - Total: 13
- Time zone: UTC+3:30 (IRST)
  - Summer (DST): UTC+4:30 (IRDT)

Soluk Bon-e Olya (Persian: سلوكبن عليا, also Romanized as Solūk Bon-e ‘Olyā; also known as Solūk Bon-e Bālā) is a village in Shuil Rural District, Rahimabad District, Rudsar County, Gilan Province, Iran. At the 2006 census, its population was 13, in 4 families.
