= Karbas Saray-e Olya =

Karbas Saray-e Olya كرباس سراي عليا
- Village
- Location within Iran
- Coordinates: 37°00′15″N 50°20′02″E
- Country: Iran
- Province: Gilan
- County: Rudsar
- Bakhsh: Rahimabad
- Rural District: Rahimabad

Population (2006)
  - Total: 60
- Time zone: UTC+3:30 (IRST)
  - Summer (DST): UTC+4:30 (IRDT)

Karbas Saray-e Olya (Persian: كرباس سراي عليا, also Romanized as Karbās Sarāy-e ‘Olyā; also known as Karbās Sarā-ye Bālā and Karbās Sar-e Bālā) is a village in Rahimabad Rural District, Rahimabad District, Rudsar County, Gilan Province, Iran. At the 2006 census, its population was 60, in 14 families.
