= Mayestan-e Pain =

Mayestan-e Pain مايستان پائين
- Village
- Location within Iran
- Coordinates: 36°46′12″N 50°17′12″E
- Country: Iran
- Province: Gilan
- County: Rudsar
- Bakhsh: Rahimabad
- Rural District: Siyarastaq Yeylaq

Population (2006)
  - Total: 84
- Time zone: UTC+3:30 (IRST)
  - Summer (DST): UTC+4:30 (IRDT)

Mayestan-e Pain (Persian: مايستان پائين, also Romanized as Māyestān-e Pā’īn; also known as Māyestān-e Soflá) is a village in Siyarastaq Yeylaq Rural District, Rahimabad District, Rudsar County, Gilan Province, Iran. At the 2006 census, its population was 84, in 30 families.
