= Baldeh Sara =

Baldeh Sara بلده سرا
- Village
- Location within Iran
- Coordinates: 36°57′49″N 50°15′43″E
- Country: Iran
- Province: Gilan
- County: Rudsar
- Bakhsh: Rahimabad
- Rural District: Rahimabad

Population (2006)
  - Total: 116
- Time zone: UTC+3:30 (IRST)
  - Summer (DST): UTC+4:30 (IRDT)

Baldeh Sara (Persian: بلده سرا, also Romanized as Baldeh Sarā; also known as Baleh Sar) is a village in Rahimabad Rural District, Rahimabad District, Rudsar County, Gilan Province, Iran. At the 2006 census, its population was 116, in 26 families.
