= Shuk, Iran =

Village in Gilan province, Iran

Shavak Persian: شوك
- Village
- Location within Iran
- Coordinates: 36°51′46″N 50°09′35″E
- Country: Iran
- Province: Gilan
- County: Rudsar
- District: Rahimabad
- Rural District: Eshkevar-e Sofla

Population (2016)
  - Total: 235
- Time zone: UTC+3:30 (IRST)

Shavak (Persian: شوك) (Note: Also romanized as Shūk) is a village in Eshkevar-e Sofla Rural District of Rahimabad District in Rudsar County, Gilan province, Iran.

== Demographics ==
=== Population ===
At the time of the 2006 National Census, the village's population was 331 in 96 households. The following census in 2011 counted 399 people in 148 households. The 2016 census measured the population of the village as 235 people in 95 households.
