= Sezarud =

Village in Gilan province, Iran

Sezarud Persian: سزرود
- Village
- Location within Iran
- Coordinates: 36°42′40″N 50°18′57″E
- Country: Iran
- Province: Gilan
- County: Rudsar
- District: Rahimabad
- Rural District: Eshkevar-e Olya and Siyarastaq Yeylaq

Population (2016)
  - Total: 170
- Time zone: UTC+3:30 (IRST)

Sezarud (Persian: سزرود) (Note: Also romanized as Sezā Rūd and Sezarūd) is a village in Eshkevar-e Olya and Siyarastaq Yeylaq Rural District (Note: Formerly Siyarastaq Yeylaq Rural District) of Rahimabad District in Rudsar County, Gilan province, Iran.

== Demographics ==
=== Population ===
At the time of the 2006 National Census, the village's population was 101 in 26 households. The following census in 2011 counted 130 people in 52 households. The 2016 census measured the population of the village as 170 people in 60 households.
