= Lat Rud =

Village in Gilan province, Iran

Lat Rud Persian: لترود
- Village
- Location within Iran
- Coordinates: 36°45′39″N 50°15′17″E
- Country: Iran
- Province: Gilan
- County: Rudsar
- District: Rahimabad
- Rural District: Shuil

Population (2016)
  - Total: 123
- Time zone: UTC+3:30 (IRST)

Lat Rud (Persian: لترود) (Note: Also romanized as Lat Rūd; also known as Līt Rūd) is a village in Shuil Rural District of Rahimabad District in Rudsar County, Gilan province, Iran.

== Demographics ==
=== Population ===
At the time of the 2006 National Census, the village's population was 83 in 28 households. The following census in 2011 counted 48 people in 19 households. The 2016 census measured the population of the village as 123 people in 41 households.
