= Sajiran =

Village in Gilan province, Iran

Sajiran Persian: سجيران
- Village
- Location within Iran
- Coordinates: 36°52′55″N 50°14′16″E
- Country: Iran
- Province: Gilan
- County: Rudsar
- District: Rahimabad
- Rural District: Eshkevar-e Sofla

Population (2016)
  - Total: 357
- Time zone: UTC+3:30 (IRST)

Sajiran (Persian: سجيران) (Note: Also romanized as Sajīrān; also known as Sī Jeyrān) is a village in Eshkevar-e Sofla Rural District of Rahimabad District in Rudsar County, Gilan province, Iran.

== Demographics ==
=== Population ===
At the time of the 2006 National Census, the village's population was 340 in 100 households. The following census in 2011 counted 336 people in 121 households. The 2016 census measured the population of the village as 357 people in 134 households.
