= Thomas D. McLaughlin =

American architect

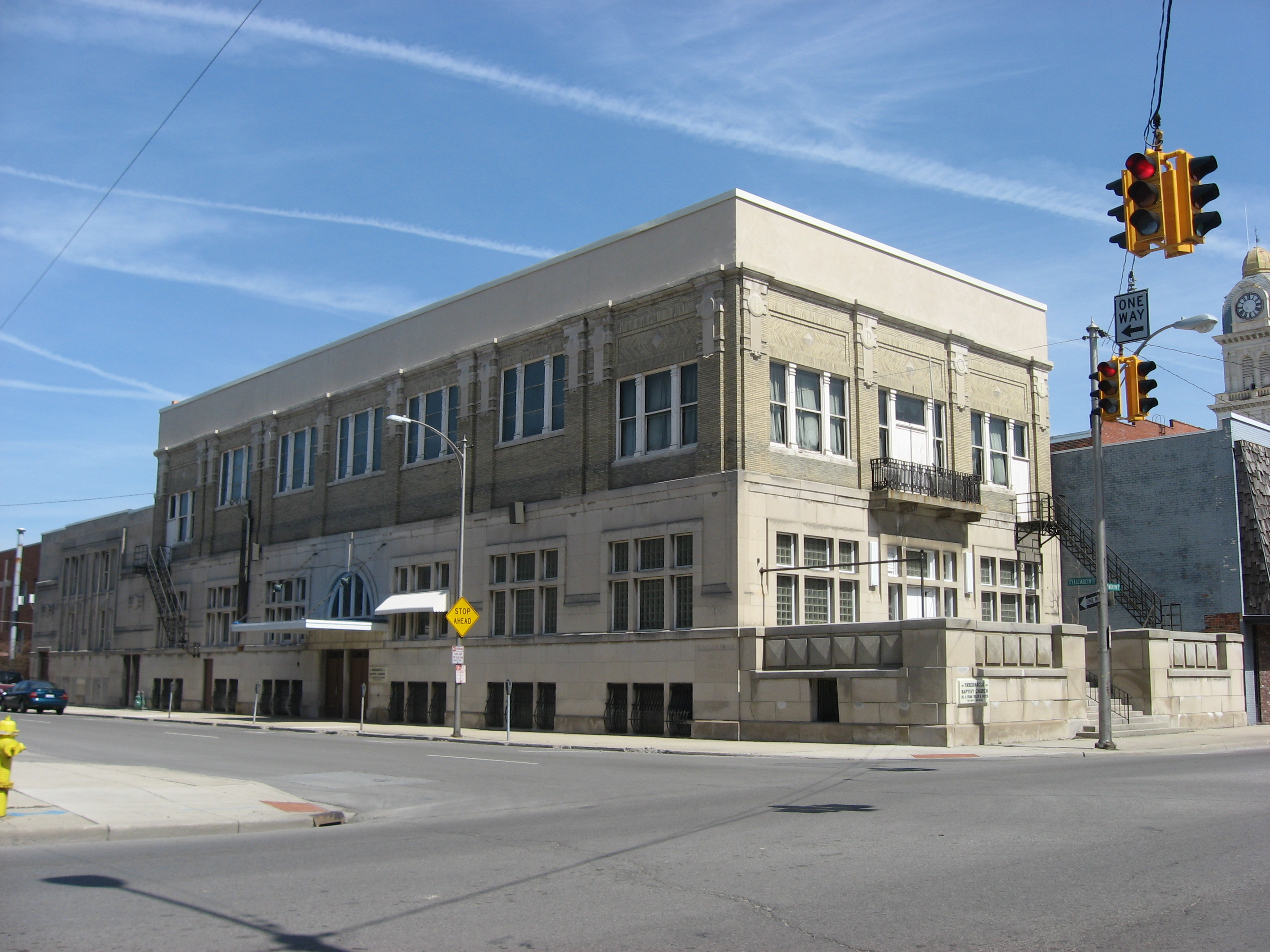
Elks Lodge (Lima, Ohio)

Lima Stadium

Thomas D. McLaughlin (born in Oil City, Pennsylvania, on August 4, 1882) was an American architect in Lima, Ohio. His work included the design for Notre Dame College's Administration Building that was built in 1927 in a Tudor Revival architectural style, along with other styles.

McLaughlin studied at Lima College in Lima, Ohio, spent three years at Hamilton College in New York and another three years studying architecture at Columbia University. He worked as superintendent of construction for the Buckeye Pipe Line Company before becoming part of Dawson & McLaughlin with Charles Wilmott Dawson who came to Lima in 1900.

Dawson was born in Plainfield, New York, on December 10, 1867. He studied at Haverford College and graduated from Massachusetts Institute of Technology in 1888, and interned with Henry Van Brunt. His works included the manufacturing plant of The Deisel-Wemmer Company, the wholesale warehouse of The Moore Brothers Company, the Central Building and the Renze Block, as well as many residences such as those for J. D. S. Neely, F. T. Cuthbert, Henry G. Wemmer, W. J. Wemmer, W. K. Boone and G. E. Bluem. McLaughlin joined him in 1906.

Notre Dame's college building was built by the contractor John T. Gill and originally housed the entire college. It was added to the National Register of Historic Places as Notre Dame College of Ohio. McLaughlin submitted a design proposal for a tower at the Ohio State Capitol.

After Dawson died, McLaughlin partnered with Peter M. Hulsken to form McLaughlin and Hulsken. Their work was featured in Ohio Architect and Builder volume 18. Hulsken was a native of the Netherlands where he practiced for several years, and studied in Berlin and Paris, before coming to Lima and entering into the partnership in 1909.

== McLaughlin's work and work credited to his firm with Charles Wilmott Dawson ==
- Lima Memorial Hall at West Elm and South Elizabeth Streets in Lima, Ohio. Credited to "Dawson & McLaughlin" and listed on the NRHP.
- Lima Stadium at 100 South Calument Avenue and East Market Street in Lima, Ohio. Credited to McLaughlin, Thomas D. & Assoc. and listed on the NRHP.
- Savings Building, Lima, Ohio
- The Ohio Theater
- Lima South High School (1917), built for $247,000 and expanded in 1923.

== McLaughlin & Hulsken ==
- Lima Club, Lima Ohio
- Allen County Memorial Building in Lima Ohio
- Elks B.P.O.E. Lodge at 138 West North Street in Lima, Ohio credited to Hulsken & McLaughlin and listed on the NRHP.
- District Tuberculosis Hospital for the Counties of Allen, Auglaize, Mercer, Shelby and Van Wert
- Presbyterian Church, Middlepoint, Ohio
- Baptist Church, Lima, Ohio
- Lima Mattress Company building
- Central Union Telegraph building in Lima, Ohio
- Jefferson High School (Delphos, Ohio)
- E. W. Jackson building in Lima, Ohio
- St. James Apartments for L.J. Miller in Lima, Ohio
- The Marquette residence for E.B. Mitchell in Lima, Ohio
- Ed Fockler residence in Lima, Ohio
- Shawnee School
- R.L. Bates residence in Lima, Ohio
- Carnegie Library Delphos, Ohio
- Carnegie Library, Lima, Ohio
- Lincoln School Delphos, Ohio
- Clarence Leilich residence in Delphos, Ohio
- Deisel Wemmer Cigar Factory building in Delphos, Ohio
- C. B. Hunt residence in Delphos, Ohio
- Carter & Carroll building in Lima, Ohio
- Gramm Motor Car Factory in Lima, Ohio
- Design for Delphos Bank building
- H.G. Wemmer residence in Lima, Ohio
- Samuel A. Baxter mausoleum in Lima Ohio
- Lima Locomotive Works garage in Lima, Ohio
