= Vishki =

Village in Gilan province, Iran

Vishki Persian: ويشكي
- Village
- Location within Iran
- Coordinates: 36°44′47″N 50°20′35″E
- Country: Iran
- Province: Gilan
- County: Rudsar
- District: Rahimabad
- Rural District: Eshkevar-e Olya and Siyarastaq Yeylaq

Population (2016)
  - Total: 134
- Time zone: UTC+3:30 (IRST)

Vishki (Persian: ويشكي) (Note: Also romanized as Vīshkī) is a village in Eshkevar-e Olya and Siyarastaq Yeylaq Rural District (Note: Formerly Siyarastaq Yeylaq Rural District) of Rahimabad District in Rudsar County, Gilan province, Iran.

== Demographics ==
=== Population ===
At the time of the 2006 National Census, the village's population was 40 in 16 households. The following census in 2011 counted 88 people in 43 households. The 2016 census measured the population of the village as 134 people in 56 households.
