= Khompateh Arbu Sara =

Village in Gilan province, Iran

Khompateh Arbu Sara Persian: خمپته اربوسرا
- Village
- Location within Iran
- Coordinates: 37°01′21″N 50°21′26″E
- Country: Iran
- Province: Gilan
- County: Rudsar
- District: Rahimabad
- Rural District: Rahimabad

Population (2016)
  - Total: 497
- Time zone: UTC+3:30 (IRST)

Khompateh Arbu Sara (Persian: خمپته اربوسرا) (Note: Also romanized as Khompateh Ārbū Sarā; also known as Khanpateh) is a village in Rahimabad Rural District of Rahimabad District in Rudsar County, Gilan province, Iran.

== Demographics ==
=== Population ===
At the time of the 2006 National Census, the village's population was 330 in 85 households. The following census in 2011 counted 695 people in 113 households. The 2016 census measured the population of the village as 497 people in 123 households.
