= Shuil =

Village in Gilan province, Iran

Shuil Persian: شوئيل
- Village
- Location within Iran
- Coordinates: 36°47′37″N 50°13′37″E
- Country: Iran
- Province: Gilan
- County: Rudsar
- District: Rahimabad
- Rural District: Shuil

Population (2016)
  - Total: 179
- Time zone: UTC+3:30 (IRST)

Shuil (Persian: شوئيل) (Note: Also romanized as Shū’īl) is a village in, and the capital of, Shuil Rural District in Rahimabad District of Rudsar County, Gilan province, Iran.

== Demographics ==
=== Population ===
At the time of the 2006 National Census, the village's population was 85 in 138 households. The following census in 2011 counted 138 people in 56 households. The 2016 census measured the population of the village as 179 people in 66 households.

== Overview ==
The main agricultural products including nuts and herbal plants are raised naturally without regular irrigation. The village is well-equipped with a large library, Health Department for adjoining villages, playground, school and previously enjoyed a local market.
