= Lashkan =

Village in Gilan province, Iran

Lashkan Persian: لشكان
- Village
- Location within Iran
- Coordinates: 36°40′50″N 50°20′47″E
- Country: Iran
- Province: Gilan
- County: Rudsar
- District: Rahimabad
- Rural District: Eshkevar-e Olya and Siyarastaq Yeylaq

Population (2016)
  - Total: 234
- Time zone: UTC+3:30 (IRST)

Lashkan (Persian: لشكان) (Note: Also romanized as Lashkān; also known as Lashgān) is a village in Eshkevar-e Olya and Siyarastaq Yeylaq Rural District (Note: Formerly Siyarastaq Yeylaq Rural District) of Rahimabad District in Rudsar County, Gilan province, Iran.

== Demographics ==
=== Population ===
At the time of the 2006 National Census, the village's population was 253 in 63 households. The following census in 2011 counted 191 people in 57 households. The 2016 census measured the population of the village as 234 people in 74 households. It was the most populous village in its rural district.
