= Ayzdin =

Village in Gilan province, Iran

Ayzdin Persian: ايزدين
- Village
- Location within Iran
- Coordinates: 36°46′10″N 50°11′30″E
- Country: Iran
- Province: Gilan
- County: Rudsar
- District: Rahimabad
- Rural District: Shuil

Population (2016)
  - Total: 113
- Time zone: UTC+3:30 (IRST)

Ayzdin (Persian: ايزدين) (Note: Also romanized as Ayzdīn; also known as Azdīn) is a village in Shuil Rural District of Rahimabad District in Rudsar County, Gilan province, Iran.

== Demographics ==
=== Population ===
At the time of the 2006 National Census, the village's population was 115 in 30 households. The following census in 2011 counted 48 people in 21 households. The 2016 census measured the population of the village as 113 people in 45 households.
