= Tukas =

Village in Gilan province, Iran

Tukas Persian: توكاس
- Village
- Location within Iran
- Coordinates: 36°45′19″N 50°15′48″E
- Country: Iran
- Province: Gilan
- County: Rudsar
- District: Rahimabad
- Rural District: Shuil

Population (2016)
  - Total: 335
- Time zone: UTC+3:30 (IRST)

Tukas (Persian: توكاس) (Note: Also romanized as Tūkās; also known as Takās) is a village in Shuil Rural District of Rahimabad District in Rudsar County, Gilan province, Iran.

== Demographics ==
=== Population ===
At the time of the 2006 National Census, the village's population was 281 in 80 households. The following census in 2011 counted 160 people in 56 households. The 2016 census measured the population of the village as 335 people in 102 households. It was the most populous village in its rural district.
