= Ziaz =

Village in Gilan province, Iran

Ziaz Persian: زياز
- Village
- Location within Iran
- Coordinates: 36°52′46″N 50°13′09″E
- Country: Iran
- Province: Gilan
- County: Rudsar
- District: Rahimabad
- Rural District: Eshkevar-e Sofla

Population (2016)
  - Total: 150
- Time zone: UTC+3:30 (IRST)

Ziaz (Persian: زياز) (Note: Also romanized as Zīāz) is a village in, and the capital of, Eshkevar-e Sofla Rural District in Rahimabad District of Rudsar County, Gilan province, Iran.

== Demographics ==
=== Population ===
At the time of the 2006 National Census, the village's population was 179 in 58 households. The following census in 2011 counted 426 people in 57 households. The 2016 census measured the population of the village as 150 people in 56 households.
