= Kashkuh, Gilan =

Kashkuh كشكوه
- Village
- Location within Iran
- Coordinates: 37°00′04″N 50°17′29″E
- Country: Iran
- Province: Gilan
- County: Rudsar
- Bakhsh: Rahimabad
- Rural District: Rahimabad

Population (2006)
  - Total: 74
- Time zone: UTC+3:30 (IRST)
  - Summer (DST): UTC+4:30 (IRDT)

Kashkuh (Persian: كشكوه, also Romanized as Kashkūh) is a village in Rahimabad Rural District, Rahimabad District, Rudsar County, Gilan Province, Iran. At the 2006 census, its population was 74, in 20 families.
