= Sarem, Gilan =

Village in Gilan province, Iran

Sarem Persian: سارم
- Village
- Location within Iran
- Coordinates: 36°44′49″N 50°18′39″E
- Country: Iran
- Province: Gilan
- County: Rudsar
- District: Rahimabad
- Rural District: Eshkevar-e Olya and Siyarastaq Yeylaq

Population (2016)
  - Total: 107
- Time zone: UTC+3:30 (IRST)

Sarem (Persian: سارم) (Note: Also romanized as Sārem) is a village in, and the capital of, Eshkevar-e Olya and Siyarastaq Yeylaq Rural District (Note: Formerly Siyarastaq Yeylaq Rural District) in Rahimabad District of Rudsar County, Gilan province, Iran.

== Demographics ==
=== Population ===
At the time of the 2006 National Census, the village's population was 51 in 18 households. The following census in 2011 counted 43 people in 18 households. The 2016 census measured the population of the village as 107 people in 37 households.
