= Latak, Rudsar =

Village in Gilan province, Iran

Latak Persian: لاتك
- Village
- Location within Iran
- Coordinates: 37°00′26″N 50°19′38″E
- Country: Iran
- Province: Gilan
- County: Rudsar
- District: Rahimabad
- Rural District: Rahimabad

Population (2016)
  - Total: 357
- Time zone: UTC+3:30 (IRST)

Latak (Persian: لاتك) (Note: Also romanized as Lātak) is a village in Rahimabad Rural District of Rahimabad District in Rudsar County, Gilan province, Iran.

== Demographics ==
=== Population ===
At the time of the 2006 National Census, the village's population was 329 in 88 households. The following census in 2011 counted 344 people in 105 households. The 2016 census measured the population of the village as 357 people in 111 households.
