= Yasur =

Yasur can refer to:

- Asaf Yasur (born 2002), Israeli Paralympic champion and world champion taekwondo athlete
- Maya Arad Yasur (born 1976), Israeli playwright
- Yasur, Iran, in Gilan Province
- Mount Yasur, a volcano in Vanuatu
- Yas'ur, Israel, a kibbutz in Israel
- Yasur (village), in Gaza District
- Yazur, in Jaffa District
- CH-53 Sea Stallion, Hebrew name is Yas'ur
