= Dargah, Rudsar =

Village in Gilan province, Iran

Dargah Persian: درگاه
- Village
- Location within Iran
- Coordinates: 36°42′48″N 50°20′49″E
- Country: Iran
- Province: Gilan
- County: Rudsar
- District: Rahimabad
- Rural District: Eshkevar-e Olya and Siyarastaq Yeylaq

Population (2016)
  - Total: 134
- Time zone: UTC+3:30 (IRST)

Dargah (Persian: درگاه) (Note: Also romanized as Dargāh) is a village in Eshkevar-e Olya and Siyarastaq Yeylaq Rural District (Note: Formerly Siyarastaq Yeylaq Rural District) of Rahimabad District in Rudsar County, Gilan province, Iran.

== Demographics ==
=== Population ===
At the time of the 2006 National Census, the village's population was 76 in 19 households. The following census in 2011 counted 49 people in 15 households. The 2016 census measured the population of the village as 134 people in 40 households.
