= Lima Chal =

Lima Chal ليماچال
- Village
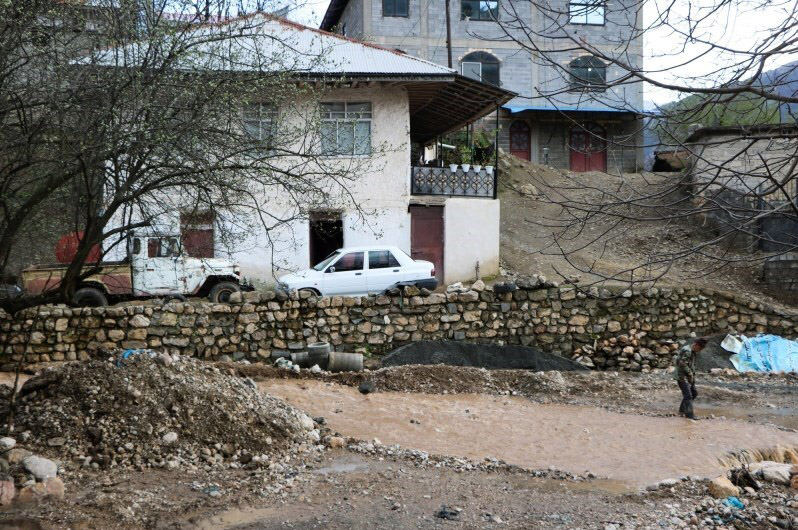

- Location within Iran
- Coordinates: 36°50′05″N 50°14′58″E
- Country: Iran
- Province: Gilan
- County: Rudsar
- Bakhsh: Rahimabad
- Rural District: Eshkevar-e Sofla

Population (2016)
  - Total: 92
- Time zone: UTC+3:30 (IRST)

Lima Chal (Persian: ليماچال, also Romanized as Līmā Chāl) is a village in Eshkevar-e Sofla Rural District, Rahimabad District, Rudsar County, Gilan Province, Iran. At the 2016 census, its population was 92, in 36 families. Increased from 57 people in 2006.
