= Saravarsu =

Village in Gilan province, Iran

Saravarsu Persian: سراورسو
- Village
- Location within Iran
- Coordinates: 36°49′12″N 50°13′25″E
- Country: Iran
- Province: Gilan
- County: Rudsar
- District: Rahimabad
- Rural District: Shuil

Population (2016)
  - Total: 109
- Time zone: UTC+3:30 (IRST)

Saravarsu (Persian: سراورسو) (Note: Also romanized as Sarāvarsū; also known as Sarā Varsī) is a village in Shuil Rural District of Rahimabad District in Rudsar County, Gilan province, Iran.

== Demographics ==
=== Population ===
At the time of the 2006 National Census, the village's population was 30 in 10 households. The following census in 2011 counted 10 people in six households. The 2016 census measured the population of the village as 109 people in 40 households.
