= Kakrud =

Kakrud or Kakerud or Kak Rud (Persian: كاكرود) may refer to:

- Kakrud, Amlash
- Kakerud, Rudsar
