= Keshayeh =

Village in Gilan province, Iran

Keshayeh Persian: كشايه
- Village
- Location within Iran
- Coordinates: 36°41′11″N 50°20′19″E
- Country: Iran
- Province: Gilan
- County: Rudsar
- District: Rahimabad
- Rural District: Eshkevar-e Olya and Siyarastaq Yeylaq

Population (2016)
  - Total: 118
- Time zone: UTC+3:30 (IRST)

Keshayeh (Persian: كشايه) (Note: Also romanized as Keshāyeh) is a village in Eshkevar-e Olya and Siyarastaq Yeylaq Rural District (Note: Formerly Siyarastaq Yeylaq Rural District) of Rahimabad District in Rudsar County, Gilan province, Iran.

== Demographics ==
=== Population ===
At the time of the 2006 National Census, the village's population was 82 in 24 households. The following census in 2011 counted 87 people in 26 households. The 2016 census measured the population of the village as 118 people in 38 households.
