= Berm Kuh =

Village in Gilan province, Iran

Berm Kuh Persian: برمكوه
- Village
- Location within Iran
- Coordinates: 36°47′03″N 50°11′09″E
- Country: Iran
- Province: Gilan
- County: Rudsar
- District: Rahimabad
- Rural District: Shuil

Population (2016)
  - Total: 118
- Time zone: UTC+3:30 (IRST)

Berm Kuh (Persian: برمكوه) (Note: Also romanized as Baramkuh and Berm Kūh) is a village in Shuil Rural District of Rahimabad District in Rudsar County, Gilan province, Iran.

== Demographics ==
=== Population ===
At the time of the 2006 National Census, the village's population was 115 in 35 households. The following census in 2011 counted 80 people in 36 households. The 2016 census measured the population of the village as 118 people in 51 households.
