= Yasur, Iran =

Yasur ياسور
- Village
- Location within Iran
- Coordinates: 36°46′50″N 50°19′02″E
- Country: Iran
- Province: Gilan
- County: Rudsar
- Bakhsh: Rahimabad
- Rural District: Siyarastaq Yeylaq

Population (2006)
  - Total: 56
- Time zone: UTC+3:30 (IRST)
  - Summer (DST): UTC+4:30 (IRDT)

Yasur (Persian: ياسور, also Romanized as Yāsūr) is a village in Siyarastaq Yeylaq Rural District, Rahimabad District, Rudsar County, Gilan Province, Iran. At the 2006 census, its population was 56, in 25 families.
