= Risan, Iran =

Village in Gilan province, Iran

Risan Persian: ريسن
- Village
- Location within Iran
- Coordinates: 36°45′59″N 50°12′11″E
- Country: Iran
- Province: Gilan
- County: Rudsar
- District: Rahimabad
- Rural District: Shuil

Population (2016)
  - Total: 113
- Time zone: UTC+3:30 (IRST)

Risan (Persian: ريسن) (Note: Also romanized as Rīsan) is a village in Shuil Rural District of Rahimabad District in Rudsar County, Gilan province, Iran.

== Demographics ==
=== Population ===
At the time of the 2006 National Census, the village's population was 152 in 39 households. The following census in 2011 counted 125 people in 55 households. The 2016 census measured the population of the village as 113 people in 41 households.
