= Soluk Bon-e Vosta =

Soluk Bon-e Vosta سلوكبن وسطي
- Village
- Location within Iran
- Coordinates: 36°49′05″N 50°13′39″E
- Country: Iran
- Province: Gilan
- County: Rudsar
- Bakhsh: Rahimabad
- Rural District: Shuil

Population (2006)
  - Total: 27
- Time zone: UTC+3:30 (IRST)
  - Summer (DST): UTC+4:30 (IRDT)

Soluk Bon-e Vosta (Persian: سلوكبن وسطي, also Romanized as Solūk Bon-e Vosţá; also known as Solūk Bon-e Vasaţ) is a village in Shuil Rural District, Rahimabad District, Rudsar County, Gilan Province, Iran. At the 2006 census, its population was 27, in 7 families.
