= Nilu, Gilan =

Village in Gilan province, Iran

Nilu Persian: نيلو
- Village
- Location within Iran
- Coordinates: 36°54′11″N 50°14′54″E
- Country: Iran
- Province: Gilan
- County: Rudsar
- District: Rahimabad
- Rural District: Eshkevar-e Sofla

Population (2016)
  - Total: 330
- Time zone: UTC+3:30 (IRST)

Nilu (Persian: نيلو) (Note: Also romanized as Nīlū) is a village in Eshkevar-e Sofla Rural District of Rahimabad District in Rudsar County, Gilan province, Iran.

== Demographics ==
=== Population ===
At the time of the 2006 National Census, the village's population was 271 in 76 households. The following census in 2011 counted 247 people in 90 households. The 2016 census measured the population of the village as 330 people in 110 households.
