= Rum Dasht =

Village in Gilan province, Iran

Rum Dasht Persian: روم دشت
- Village
- Location within Iran
- Coordinates: 36°50′15″N 50°13′28″E
- Country: Iran
- Province: Gilan
- County: Rudsar
- District: Rahimabad
- Rural District: Shuil

Population (2016)
  - Total: 200
- Time zone: UTC+3:30 (IRST)

Rum Dasht (Persian: روم دشت) (Note: Also romanized as Rūm Dasht) is a village in Shuil Rural District of Rahimabad District in Rudsar County, Gilan province, Iran.

== Demographics ==
=== Population ===
At the time of the 2006 National Census, the village's population was 98 in 37 households. The following census in 2011 counted 152 people in 70 households. The 2016 census measured the population of the village as 200 people in 77 households.
