= Mayestan-e Bala =

Mayestan-e Bala مايستان بالا
- Village
- Location within Iran
- Coordinates: 36°46′32″N 50°16′23″E
- Country: Iran
- Province: Gilan
- County: Rudsar
- Bakhsh: Rahimabad
- Rural District: Siyarastaq Yeylaq

Population (2006)
  - Total: 35
- Time zone: UTC+3:30 (IRST)
  - Summer (DST): UTC+4:30 (IRDT)

Mayestan-e Bala (Persian: مايستان بالا, also Romanized as Māyestān-e Bālā; also known as Māyestān-e ‘Olyā) is a village in Siyarastaq Yeylaq Rural District, Rahimabad District, Rudsar County, Gilan Province, Iran. At the 2006 census, its population was 35, in 11 families.
