= Pudeh =

Pudeh (Persian: پوده) may refer to:

- Pudeh, Gilan
- Pudeh, Isfahan
