= Giri, Iran =

Village in Gilan province, Iran

Giri Persian: گیری
- Village
- Location within Iran
- Coordinates: 36°41′10″N 50°22′34″E
- Country: Iran
- Province: Gilan
- County: Rudsar
- District: Rahimabad
- Rural District: Eshkevar-e Olya and Siyarastaq Yeylaq

Population (2016)
  - Total: 148
- Time zone: UTC+3:30 (IRST)

Giri (Persian: گیری) (Note: Also romanized as Gīrī) is a village in Eshkevar-e Olya and Siyarastaq Yeylaq Rural District (Note: Formerly Siyarastaq Yeylaq Rural District) of Rahimabad District in Rudsar County, Gilan province, Iran.

== Demographics ==
=== Population ===
At the time of the 2006 National Census, the village's population was 157 in 47 households. The following census in 2011 counted 102 people in 40 households. The 2016 census measured the population of the village as 148 people in 60 households.
