= Notre Dame College =

Catholic college in South Euclid, Ohio, US

- Motto: Changing the world, one student at a time.
- Type: Private college
- Active: 1922–2024
- Religious affiliation: Roman Catholic
- Location: 4545 College Road, South Euclid, Ohio, United States
- Campus: 48 acres (19.4 ha); Suburban
- Colors: Royal Blue and Yellow Gold
- Nickname: Falcons
- Mascot: Fearless

Notre Dame College (Notre Dame College of Ohio or NDC) was a private Catholic college in South Euclid, Ohio, United States. Established in 1922 by the Sisters of Notre Dame as a women's college, it was coeducational from January 2001 until its closure. The Sisters of Notre Dame ended their sponsorship of the college in 2023. In February 2024, the college announced it would be closing at the end of the spring semester, with agreements in place for existing students to complete their degrees at partner colleges and universities. The college ultimately closed on May 2, 2024.

While the majority of Notre Dame's students were from Ohio, the student body represented 35 states and 21 countries in 2022. The college offered a number of extracurricular activities to its students, including honor societies, clubs, student organizations, and athletics.

The college was a member of the National Collegiate Athletic Association (NCAA) at the Division II level and fielded athletic teams known as the Falcons. Notre Dame was a member of the Mountain East Conference (MEC), a Division II conference that began playing in the 2013–14 school year. Prior to joining the NCAA, the college competed in the NAIA as a member of the American Mideast Conference. The official school and athletic colors were royal blue and gold.

== History ==
- Notre Dame College of Ohio
- U.S. National Register of Historic Places
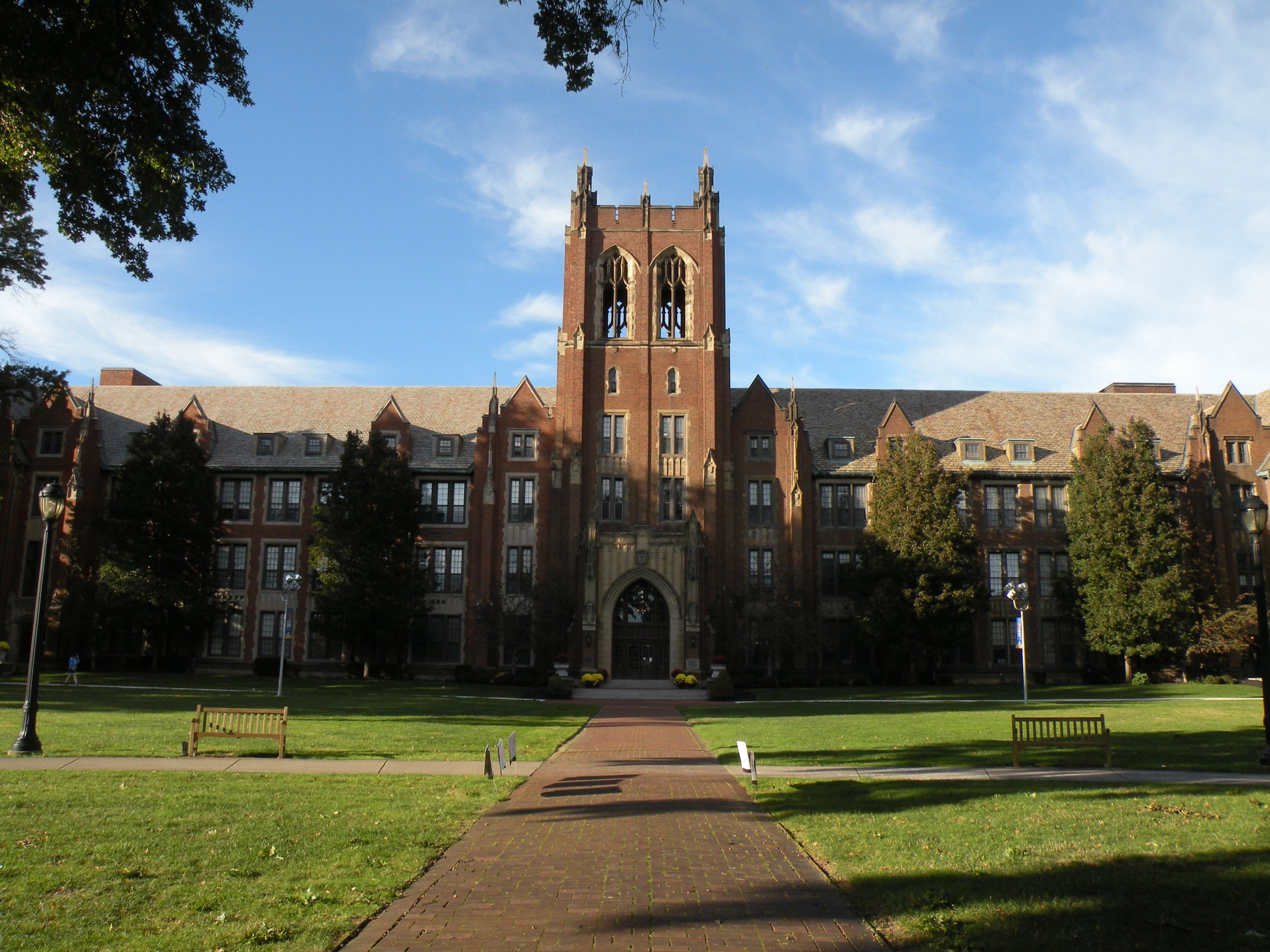
- Notre Dame College Administration Building from Quinlivan Circle

- Location within Ohio Location within the United States
- Location: 4545 College Rd. South Euclid, Ohio
- Coordinates: 41°30′27″N 81°30′56″W
- Built: 1927
- Architect: Thomas D. McLaughlin; John T. Gill
- Architectural style: Tudor Revival
- NRHP reference No.: 83004267
- Added to NRHP: December 8, 1983

Notre Dame College was founded in the summer of 1922 on Ansel Road in Cleveland as a women's college under the guidance of Mother M. Cecilia Romen, SND. Later that year, Mary Evarista Harks, SND, became NDC's first president (1922–1943). In its early years the college had a faculty population of 9 and a full-time student enrollment of 13 women and 11 novices; in addition 30 students were enrolled in extension courses. On June 15, 1925, NDC conferred its first graduating class in the form of two-year teaching certificates. In the following year, 14 students received their bachelor's degrees and state certificates to teach in Ohio high schools; becoming NDC's first graduating class of four-year college degrees. In June 1923, the Sisters of Notre Dame leased 39 acres (15.8 ha) along Green Road in South Euclid to build a new campus and purchased 15 acres (6.1 ha) in 1924. Construction of the campus began in the fall of 1926 and opened on Sept. 17, 1928. The college later bought the 39 leased acres (160,000 m^{2}) in 1933. The college was originally located in a single building and expanded over time, Harks Hall was built in 1955 to house resident students with two other residence halls built in the 1960s. NDC constructed the Clara Fritzsche Library in 1971 and the Keller Center in 1987.

Traditionally, the college was primarily a residential campus, but in 1978, Notre Dame College began to offer a program known as Weekend College, or WECO. Local residents whose schedules prevented them from taking classes during the normal work week enrolled in weekend college classes to earn a degree.

On December 8, 1983, based on its architectural importance, Notre Dame College's historic Administration Building, built in 1927 in the Tudor Revival and other styles, was added to the National Register of Historic Places. The building, designed by architect Thomas D. McLaughlin and built by contractor John T. Gill, originally housed the entire college.

In the fall of 1991, Notre Dame's Master of Education program started, with the first class graduating in 1994. Although men had been allowed to enroll in certain programs, such as NDC's Law Enforcement Education A.A. degree program in 1969 and later WECO and master's programs, in 2001 the college officially became coeducational with its first full-time male enrollment. The college graduated its first co-ed class on May 7, 2005. After co-education, enrollment doubled from under 1,000 in 2001 to over 2,000 in 2010. In 2008, NDC began construction on two additional residence halls, North and South halls. The structures opened in 2009 at a cost of $15 million.

The college announced in early 2024 that it would be closing at the end of the spring semester. This followed a few years of significant financial challenges. Before deciding to close, college administrators and trustees explored merging with Cleveland State University. After closing, Lake Erie College in nearby Painesville agreed to become NDC's "institution of record", preserving documents and other historical items.

The college was auctioned off on May 7, 2026, with Akron Children's Hospital winning the auction.

== Academics ==
Notre Dame College offered 30 majors and individually designed majors and had a total enrollment of 1,106 undergraduate students in fall 2020. The 48-acre (19.4 ha) main academic and residential campus was located 10 miles (16 km) east of Cleveland in South Euclid. Notre Dame College offered associate degrees, bachelor's degrees, and master's degrees and was divided into five Academic Divisions:

- Arts & Humanities
- Business Administration
- Education
- Nursing
- Science & Mathematics

The college also had three special programs and two interdisciplinary programs. NDC offered 30 majors in its bachelor's degree programs. It also offered an Associate in Arts degree in Pastoral Ministry. and a master's degree in National Security and Intelligence Studies. In 2018, the college introduced graduate programs in Business.

== Athletics ==
Notre Dame College's athletic teams were known as the Falcons, whose colors are blue and gold. The school sponsored 22 intercollegiate teams. The college was a member of the National Collegiate Athletic Association (NCAA) at the Division II level. In August 2012, Notre Dame became a charter member of the Mountain East Conference (MEC), a new Division II league that began play in the 2013–14 school year. The MEC, made up mostly of schools leaving the West Virginia Intercollegiate Athletic Conference, also included another Ohio school and former NAIA member in Urbana University. It sponsored 16 sports, eight each for men and women.

Notre Dame College previously competed in the National Association of Intercollegiate Athletics (NAIA) as a member of the American Mideast Conference (AMC) from 1998–99 to 2010–11. The college began the transition process during the 2009–10 academic year as an NCAA candidacy institution and was granted provisional status for the 2011–12 academic year. In July 2012, the college received notice it was accepted as a full member starting in the 2012–13 academic year; as a full member the college is eligible for postseason conference and NCAA competition. During its time in the NAIA, the college was known for its men's wrestling program. The team won back-to-back NAIA National Championships in 2010 and 2011. In 2014, the school's second year of NCAA eligibility, Notre Dame College won the Division II national wrestling championship led by four-time national champion and undefeated wrestler Joey Davis.

The men's rugby team won the 2017 USA Rugby men's collegiate Division IAA national championship, defeating UC–Davis, 40–20. The team also won the 2023 NCR (National Collegiate Rugby) DI national championship, defeating St Bonaventure, 33-10.

=== Men's ===
Sports that were sponsored by the MEC are in italics.

- Baseball
- Basketball
- Bowling
- Football
- Golf
- Rugby
- Soccer
- Swimming and diving
- Wrestling
- Track and field
- Cross country

=== Women's ===
Sports that were sponsored by the MEC are in italics.

- Basketball
- Golf
- Lacrosse
- Rugby
- Soccer
- Softball
- Swimming and diving
- Water polo
- Volleyball
- Track and field
- Cross country

== Notable alumni ==
- Jarred Brooks - MMA fighter
- Joey Davis - MMA fighter
- Marye Anne Fox - physical organic chemist, university administrator
- Cody Garbrandt - MMA fighter
- Dorothy Schmitt Gauchat - Catholic Worker; co-founder of Our Lady of the Wayside (Avon, Ohio), a home for children with severe disabilities; and foundress of the Colette Marie Infant Hospice for children with HIV/AIDS
- Mary Beth Ruskai - Mathematical physicist
- Chris Via - professional bowler on the PBA Tour, winner of the 2021 U.S. Open
- Mary Helen Washington - English professor
- Tanner Scott - MLB pitcher

== See also ==
- List of Roman Catholic universities and colleges in the United States
