= Bazneshin-e Sofla =

Village in Gilan province, Iran

Bazneshin-e Sofla Persian: بازنشين سفلي
- Village
- Location within Iran
- Coordinates: 37°00′45″N 50°19′17″E
- Country: Iran
- Province: Gilan
- County: Rudsar
- District: Rahimabad
- Rural District: Rahimabad

Population (2016)
  - Total: 850
- Time zone: UTC+3:30 (IRST)

Bazneshin-e Sofla (Persian: بازنشين سفلي) (Note: Also romanized as Bāzneshīn-e Soflá; also known as Bāzneshīn-e Pā’īn) is a village in Rahimabad Rural District of Rahimabad District in Rudsar County, Gilan province, Iran.

== Demographics ==
=== Population ===
At the time of the 2006 National Census, the village's population was 804 in 216 households. The following census in 2011 counted 823 people in 257 households. The 2016 census measured the population of the village as 850 people in 274 households.
