= Alima (given name) =

Alima is an African and Kazakh feminine given name. Notable people with the name include:

- Alima Boumediene-Thiery (born 1956), French politician
- Alima Mahama (born 1957), Ghanaian lawyer and government official
- Alima Moro (born 1983), Ghanaian football player
