= Soluk Bon-e Sofla =

Village in Gilan province, Iran

Soluk Bon-e Sofla Persian: سلوكبن سفلي
- Village
- Location within Iran
- Coordinates: 36°49′05″N 50°13′44″E
- Country: Iran
- Province: Gilan
- County: Rudsar
- District: Rahimabad
- Rural District: Shuil

Population (2016)
  - Total: 101
- Time zone: UTC+3:30 (IRST)

Soluk Bon-e Sofla (Persian: سلوكبن سفلي) (Note: Also romanized as Solūk Bon-e Soflá; also known as Solūk Bon-e Pā’īn and Solūkbon) is a village in Shuil Rural District of Rahimabad District in Rudsar County, Gilan province, Iran.

== Demographics ==
=== Population ===
At the time of the 2006 National Census, the village's population was 45 in 14 households. The following census in 2011 counted 45 people in 20 households. The 2016 census measured the population of the village as 101 people in 33 households.
