= Kakerud, Rudsar =

Village in Gilan province, Iran

Kakerud Persian: كاكرود
- Village
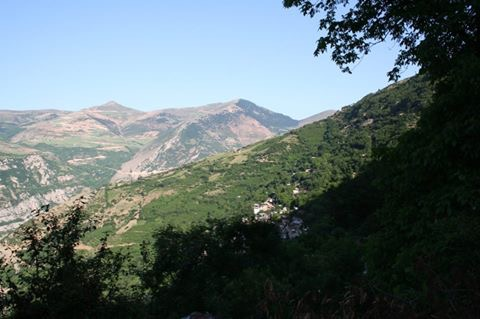

- Location within Iran
- Coordinates: 36°48′30″N 50°16′28″E
- Country: Iran
- Province: Gilan
- County: Rudsar
- District: Rahimabad
- Rural District: Eshkevar-e Sofla

Population (2016)
  - Total: 223
- Time zone: UTC+3:30 (IRST)

Gereh Govabar (Persian: گره گوابر) (Note: Also romanized as Gereh Govābar) is a village in Eshkevar-e Sofla Rural District of Rahimabad District in Rudsar County, Gilan province, Iran.

== Demographics ==
=== Population ===
At the time of the 2006 National Census, the village's population was 322 in 91 households. The following census in 2011 counted 267 people in 87 households. The 2016 census measured the population of the village as 416 people in 134 households.
