= Pudeh, Gilan =

Village in Gilan province, Iran

Pudeh Persian: پوده
- Village
- Location within Iran
- Coordinates: 36°45′41″N 50°17′27″E
- Country: Iran
- Province: Gilan
- County: Rudsar
- District: Rahimabad
- Rural District: Eshkevar-e Olya and Siyarastaq Yeylaq

Population (2016)
  - Total: 197
- Time zone: UTC+3:30 (IRST)

Pudeh (Persian: پوده) (Note: Also romanized as Pūdeh) is a village in Eshkevar-e Olya and Siyarastaq Yeylaq Rural District (Note: Formerly Siyarastaq Yeylaq Rural District) of Rahimabad District in Rudsar County, Gilan province, Iran.

== Demographics ==
=== Population ===
At the time of the 2006 National Census, the village's population was 173 in 47 households. The following census in 2011 counted 165 people in 72 households. The 2016 census measured the population of the village as 197 people in 69 households.
