= Rahimabad, Iran =

City in Gilan province, Iran

Rahimabad Persian: رحیم آباد
- City
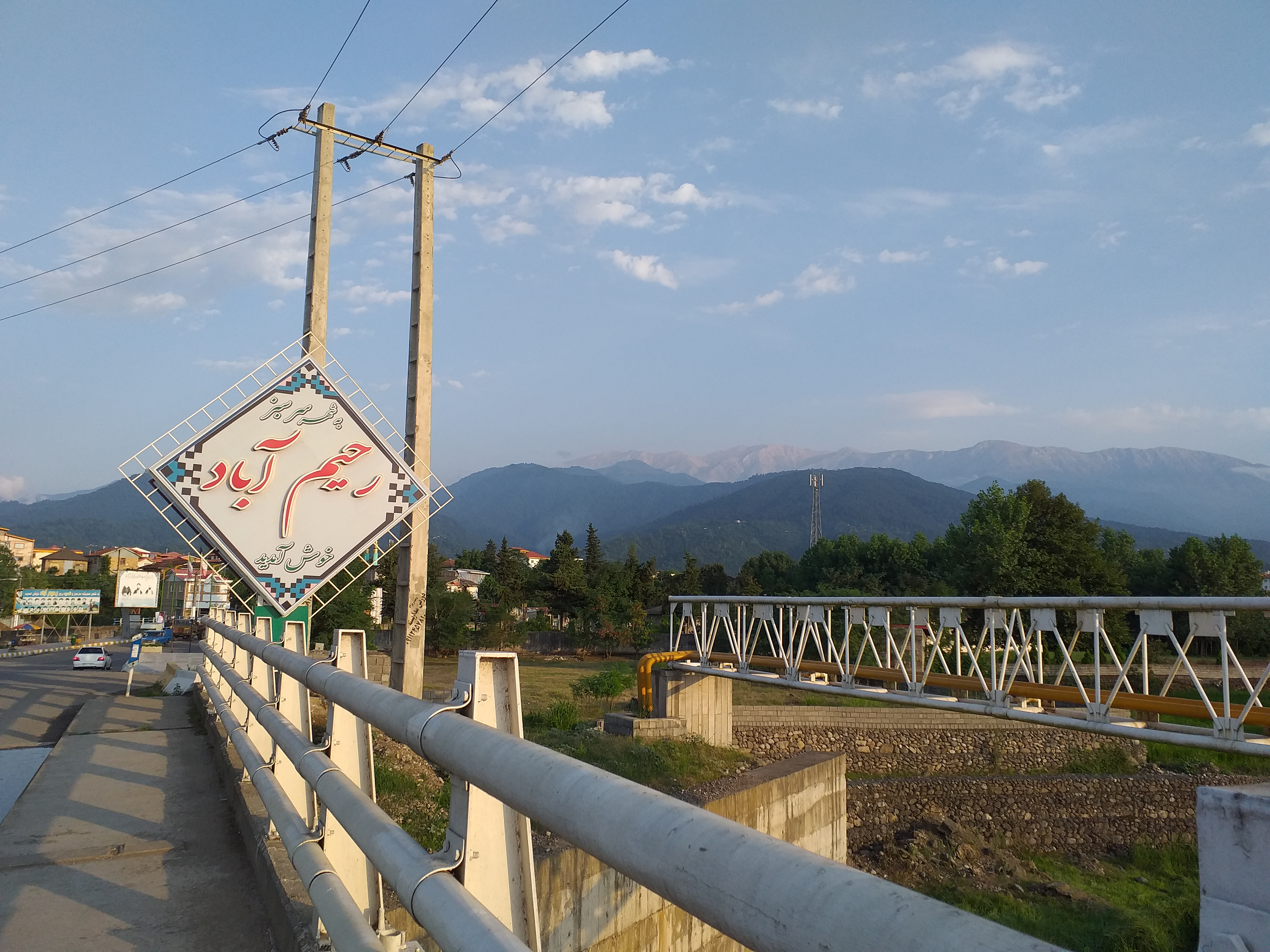
- Rahimabad city entrance

- Location within Iran
- Coordinates: 37°01′58″N 50°19′46″E
- Country: Iran
- Province: Gilan
- County: Rudsar
- District: Rahimabad

Population (2016)
  - Total: 10,571
- Time zone: UTC+3:30 (IRST)

Rahimabad (Persian: رحیم آباد) (Note: Also romanized as Raḩīmābād) is a city in, and the capital of, Rahimabad District of Rudsar County, Gilan province, Iran.

== Demographics ==
=== Population ===
At the time of the 2006 National Census, the city's population was 6,994 in 2,042 households. The following census in 2011 counted 8,719 people in 2,724 households. The 2016 census measured the population of the city as 10,571 people in 2,724 households.
