= Bazneshin-e Olya =

Village in Gilan province, Iran

Bazneshin-e Olya Persian: بازنشين عليا
- Village
- Location within Iran
- Coordinates: 37°00′22″N 50°19′02″E
- Country: Iran
- Province: Gilan
- County: Rudsar
- District: Rahimabad
- Rural District: Rahimabad

Population (2016)
  - Total: 350
- Time zone: UTC+3:30 (IRST)

Bazneshin-e Olya (Persian: بازنشين عليا) (Note: Also romanized as Bāzneshīn-e ‘Olyā; also known as Bāzneshīn and Bāzneshīn-e Bālā) is a village in Rahimabad Rural District of Rahimabad District in Rudsar County, Gilan province, Iran.

== Demographics ==
=== Population ===
At the time of the 2006 National Census, the village's population was 234 in 64 households. The following census in 2011 counted 259 people in 89 households. The 2016 census measured the population of the village as 350 people in 120 households.
