= Aghuzbon Kand Sar =

Village in Gilan province, Iran

Aghuzbon Kand Sar Persian: آغوزبن كندسر
- Village
- Location within Iran
- Coordinates: 36°52′50″N 50°12′30″E
- Country: Iran
- Province: Gilan
- County: Rudsar
- District: Rahimabad
- Rural District: Eshkevar-e Sofla

Population (2016)
  - Total: 627
- Time zone: UTC+3:30 (IRST)

Aghuzbon Kand Sar (Persian: آغوزبن كندسر) (Note: Also romanized as Āghūzbon Kand Sar; also known as Āghūzbon Kandeh and Āghūzbon Kandeh Sar) is a village in Eshkevar-e Sofla Rural District of Rahimabad District in Rudsar County, Gilan province, Iran.

== Demographics ==
=== Population ===
At the time of the 2006 National Census, the village's population was 391 in 102 households. The following census in 2011 counted 346 people in 125 households. The 2016 census measured the population of the village as 627 people in 189 households. It was the most populous village in its rural district.
