= Lima, Iran =

Village in Gilan province, Iran

Lima Persian: ليما
- Village
- Location within Iran
- Coordinates: 36°50′34″N 50°15′05″E
- Country: Iran
- Province: Gilan
- County: Rudsar
- District: Rahimabad
- Rural District: Eshkevar-e Sofla

Population (2016)
  - Total: 238
- Time zone: UTC+3:30 (IRST)

Lima (Persian: ليما) (Note: Also romanized as Līmā) is a village in Eshkevar-e Sofla Rural District of Rahimabad District in Rudsar County, Gilan province, Iran.

== Demographics ==
=== Population ===
At the time of the 2006 National Census, the village's population was 237 in 81 households. The following census in 2011 counted 203 people in 70 households. The 2016 census measured the population of the village as 238 people in 88 households.
