= Kushkuh =

Village in Gilan province, Iran

Kushkuh Persian: كوشكوه
- Village
- Location within Iran
- Coordinates: 37°00′40″N 50°20′58″E
- Country: Iran
- Province: Gilan
- County: Rudsar
- District: Rahimabad
- Rural District: Rahimabad

Population (2016)
  - Total: 408
- Time zone: UTC+3:30 (IRST)

Kushkuh (Persian: كوشكوه) (Note: Also romanized as Kūshkūh; also known as Kūshkūh-e Bālā) is a village in Rahimabad Rural District of Rahimabad District in Rudsar County, Gilan province, Iran.

== Demographics ==
=== Population ===
At the time of the 2006 National Census, the village's population was 716 in 187 households. The following census in 2011 counted 492 people in 134 households. The 2016 census measured the population of the village as 408 people in 134 households.
