= Bala Lam Beshkest =

Village in Gilan province, Iran

Bala Lam Beshkest Persian: بالالام بشكست
- Village
- Location within Iran
- Coordinates: 36°53′28″N 50°11′48″E
- Country: Iran
- Province: Gilan
- County: Rudsar
- District: Rahimabad
- Rural District: Eshkevar-e Sofla

Population (2016)
  - Total: 201
- Time zone: UTC+3:30 (IRST)

Bala Lam Beshkest (Persian: بالالام بشكست) (Note: Also romanized as Bālā Lām Beshkest) is a village in Eshkevar-e Sofla Rural District of Rahimabad District in Rudsar County, Gilan province, Iran.

== Demographics ==
=== Population ===
At the time of the 2006 National Census, the village's population was 112 in 36 households. The following census in 2011 counted 140 people in 53 households. The 2016 census measured the population of the village as 201 people in 65 households.
