= Elks Lodge (Lima, Ohio) =

- U.S. National Register of Historic Places
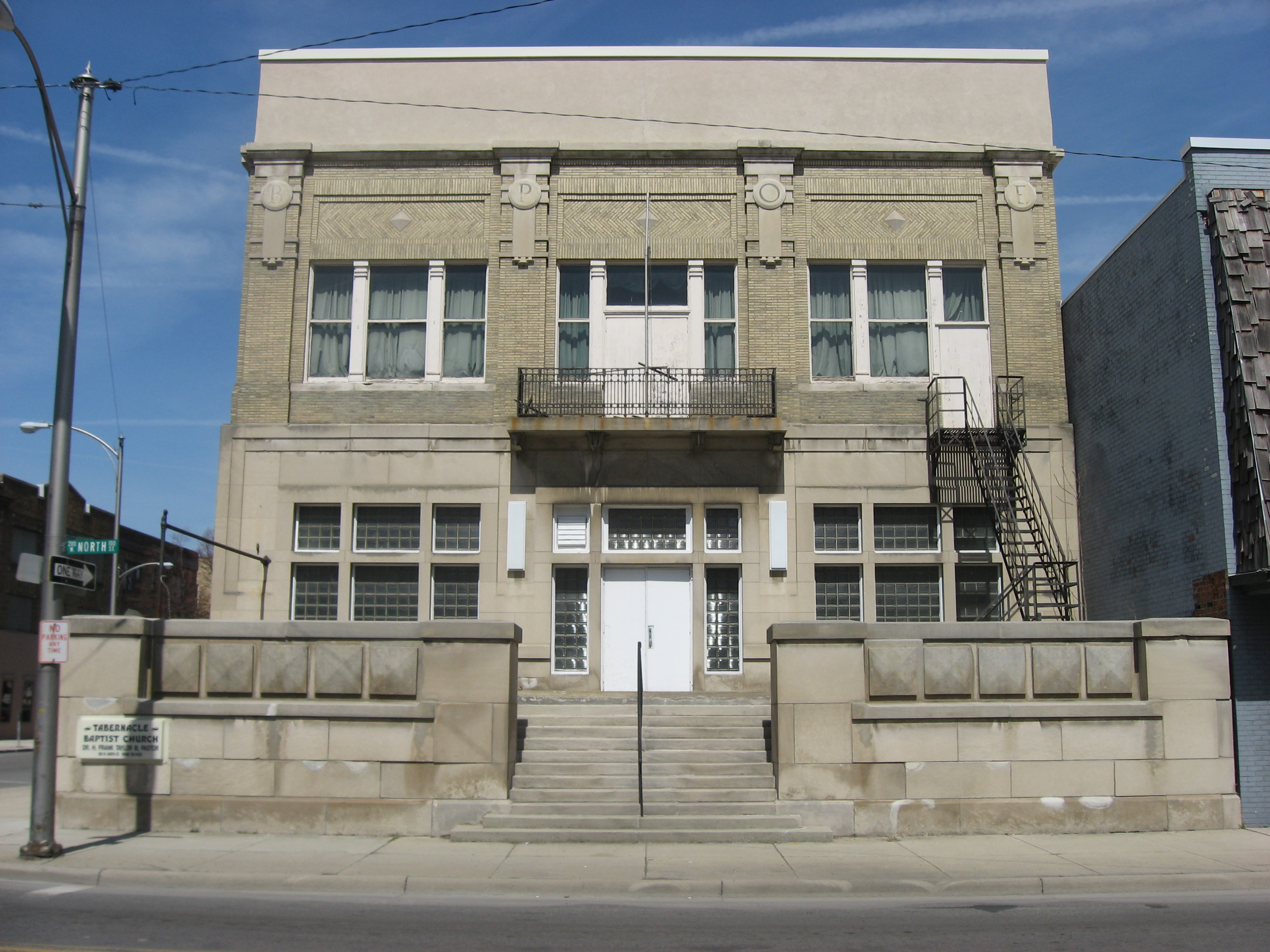
- Front of the former lodge

- Location within Ohio Location within the United States
- Location: 138 W. North St., Lima, Ohio
- Coordinates: 40°44′35″N 84°6′23″W
- Area: less than one acre
- Built: 1909
- Architect: Hulsken & McLaughlin
- Architectural style: Prairie School
- MPS: Lima MRA
- NRHP reference No.: 82001865
- Added to NRHP: October 7, 1982

The former Elks Lodge (B.P.O. E. #54) is a historic building in Lima, Ohio, United States. It was built in 1909 for use by a local Elks group. The building was added to the National Register of Historic Places on October 7, 1982.

== History ==
In 1886, the B.P.O.E. #54 was the 54th group of the Benevolent and Protective Order of Elks to be chartered. It is located in Lima, Ohio within the Ohio West Central District No. 7120. The group built this lodge building in 1909 at 138 West North Street. Around the time of its construction in the early twentieth century, oil and railroading had taken Lima's economy to an extremely prosperous point. The Elks Lodge building was funded by contributions from members.

The Elks Lodge #54 is now located at 302 West North Street in Lima. The group sold the 139 West North Street building, which, as of 2019, is used by Tabernacle Baptist Church.

== Architecture ==
Hulsken & McLaughlin, a Lima architectural firm, designed the Elks Lodge in the Prairie School style. The lodge building was added to the National Register of Historic Places on October 7, 1982. It was one of seventeen Lima buildings listed on the register as a group, the "Lima Multiple Resource Area". Of these buildings, it was one of the newest.

== See also ==
- Elks Lodge
- List of Elks buildings
