= Karbas Saray-e Sofla =

Village in Gilan province, Iran

Karbas Saray-e Sofla Persian: كرباس سراي سفلي
- Village
- Location within Iran
- Coordinates: 37°00′48″N 50°18′33″E
- Country: Iran
- Province: Gilan
- County: Rudsar
- District: Rahimabad
- Rural District: Rahimabad

Population (2016)
  - Total: 433
- Time zone: UTC+3:30 (IRST)

Karbas Saray-e Sofla (Persian: كرباس سراي سفلي) (Note: Also romanized as Karbās Sarāy-e Soflá; also known as Karbās Sarā-ye Pā’īn) is a village in Rahimabad Rural District of Rahimabad District in Rudsar County, Gilan province, Iran.

== Demographics ==
=== Population ===
At the time of the 2006 National Census, the village's population was 409 in 95 households. The following census in 2011 counted 521 people in 142 households. The 2016 census measured the population of the village as 433 people in 144 households.
