= Gramm-Bernstein Company =

Automobile company in Ohio, United States in the early 20th century

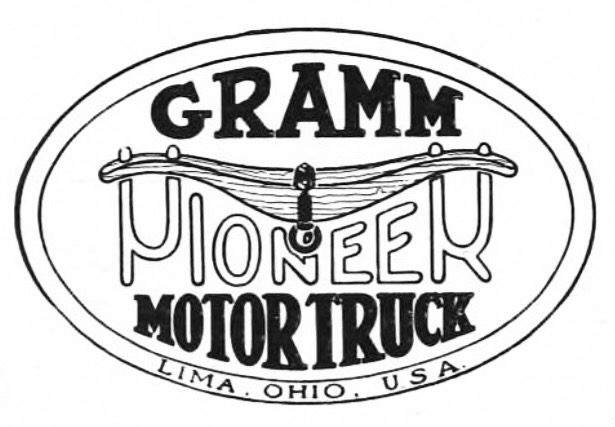
- Industry: Automotive
- Founded: 1912; 114 years ago
- Defunct: 1930; 96 years ago
- Headquarters: Lima, Ohio
- Products: trucks

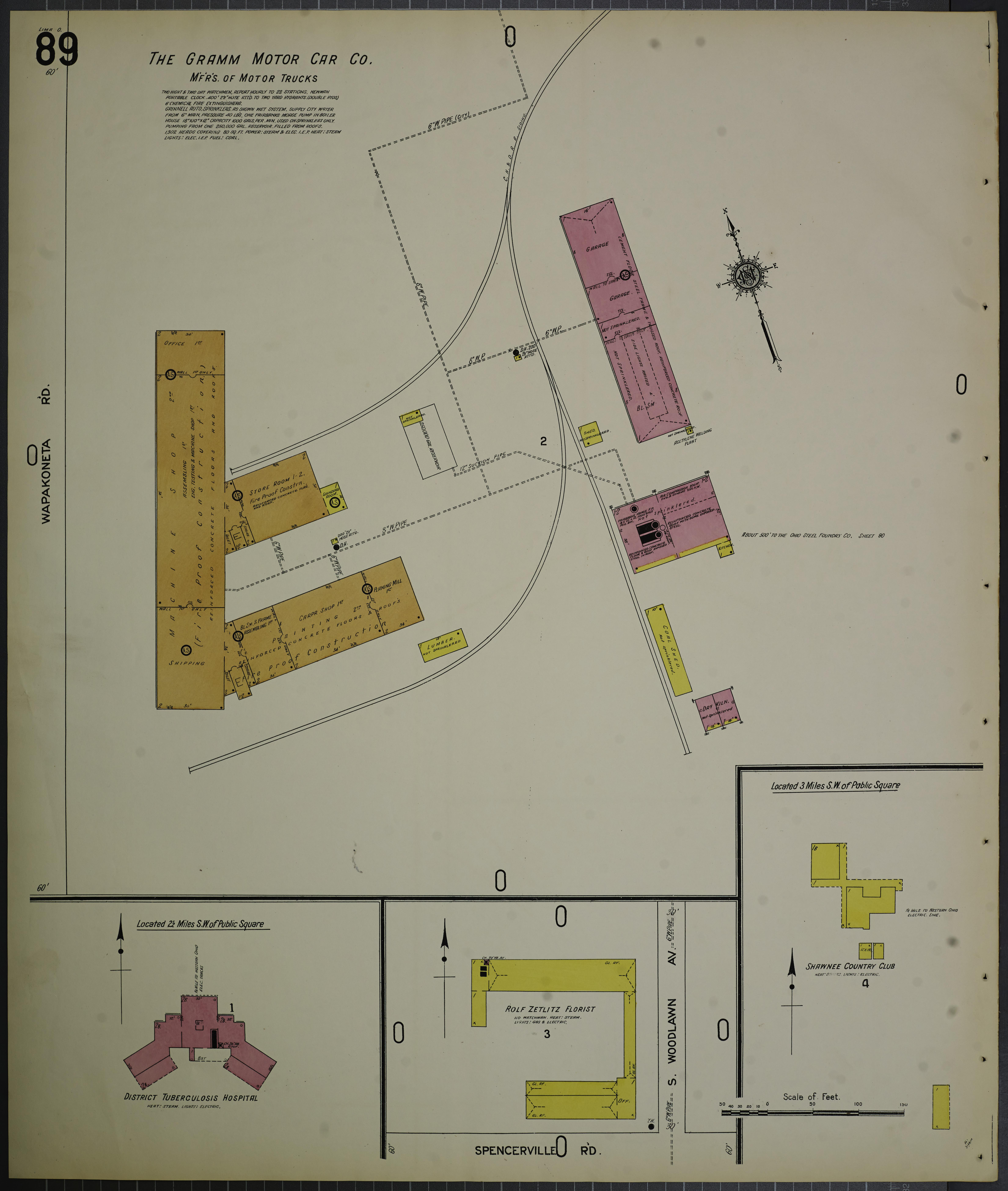
Gramm Motor Car Co. Plant (1911)

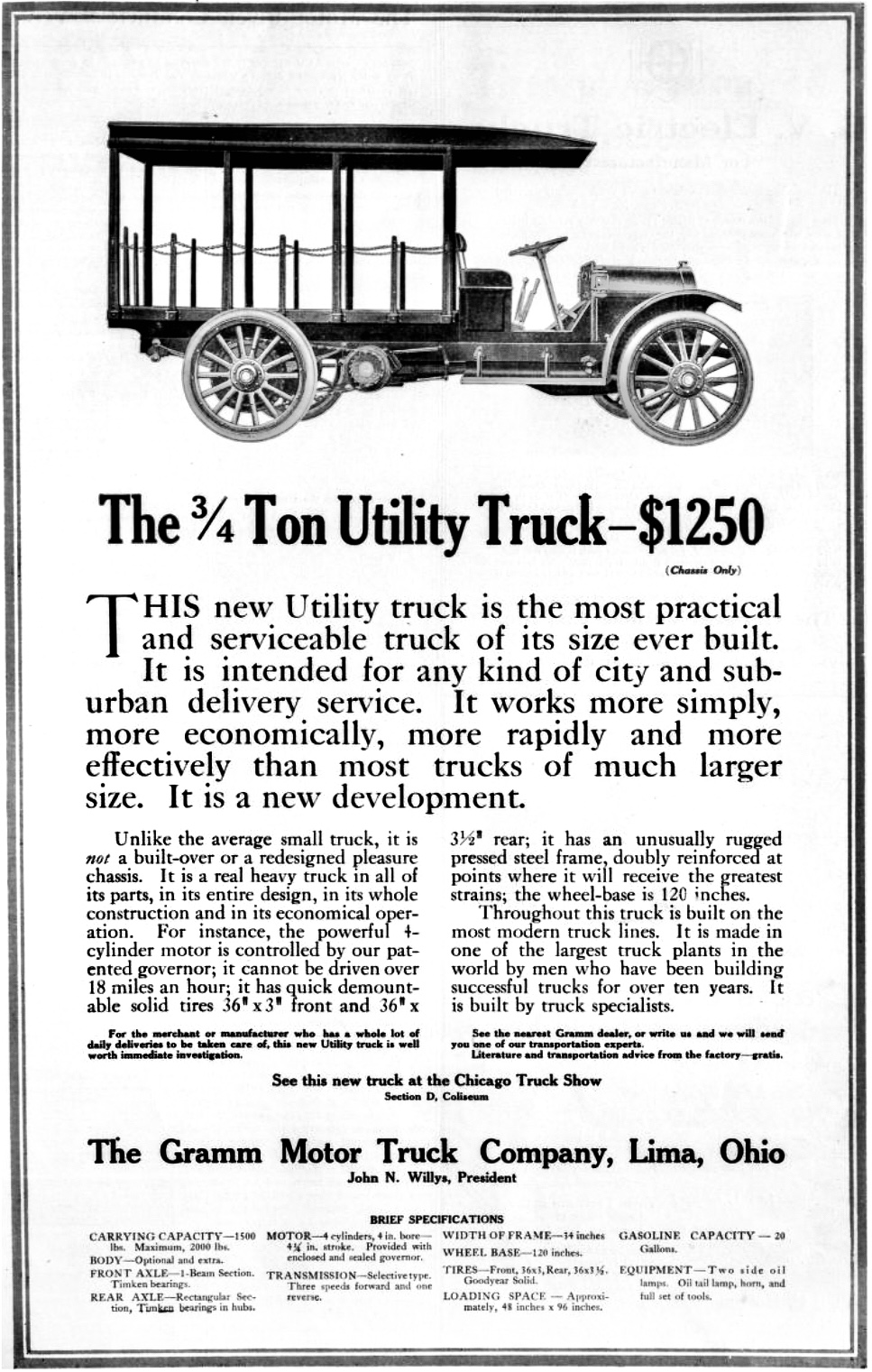
Gramm 0.75 t (1913)

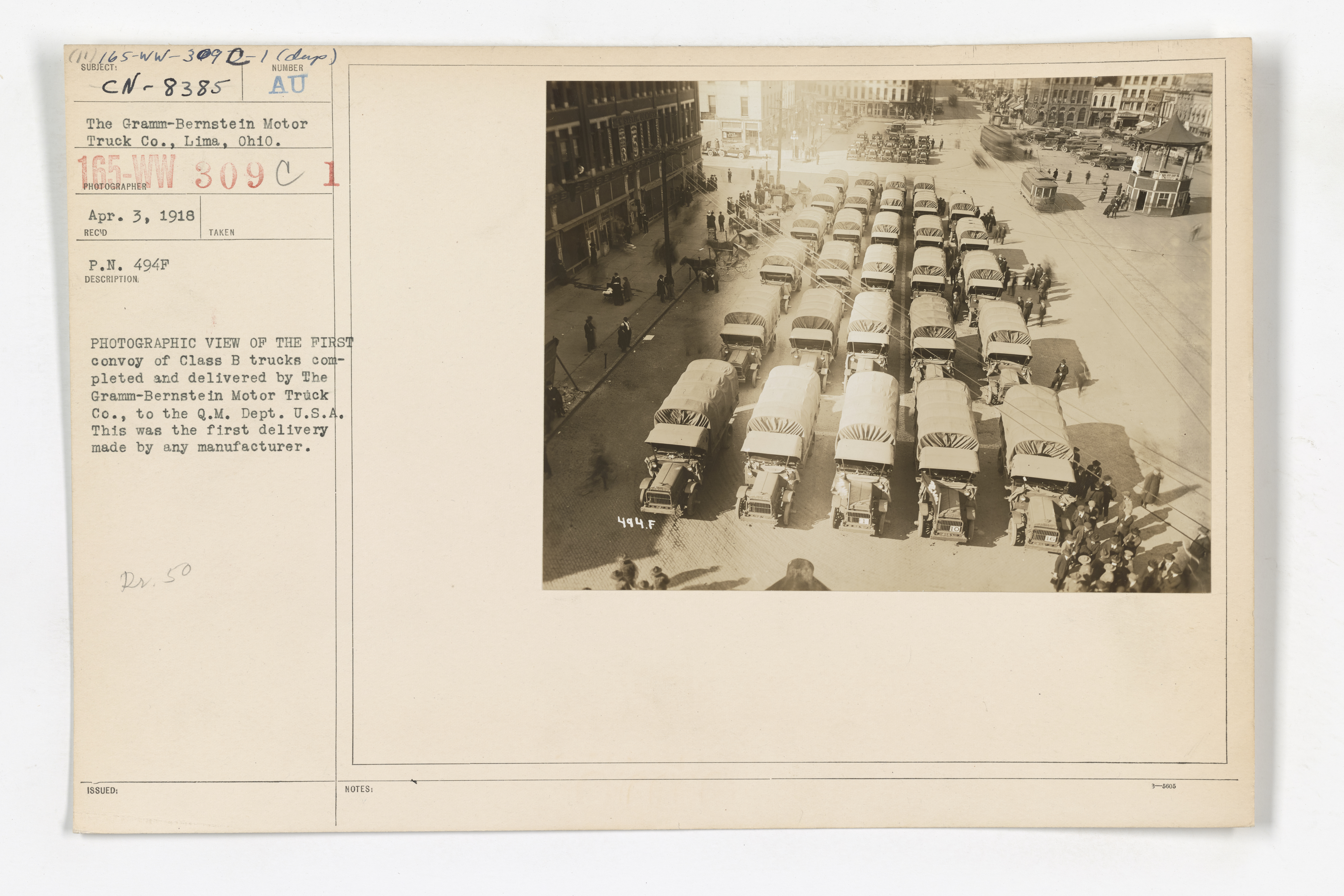
Delivery of Gramm-Bernstein trucks in April 1918

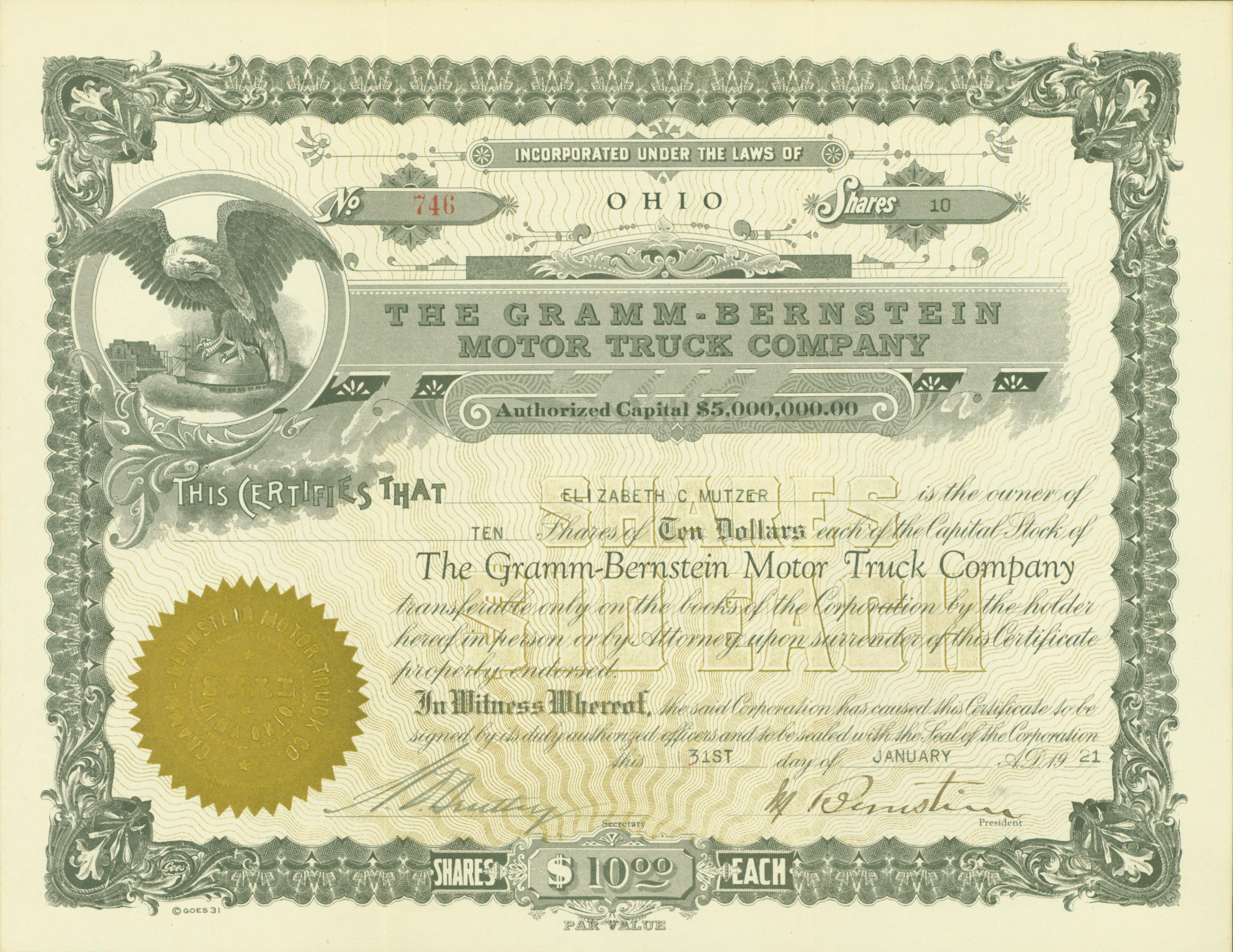
Share of the Gramm-Bernstein Motor Truck Company, issued 31 January 1921

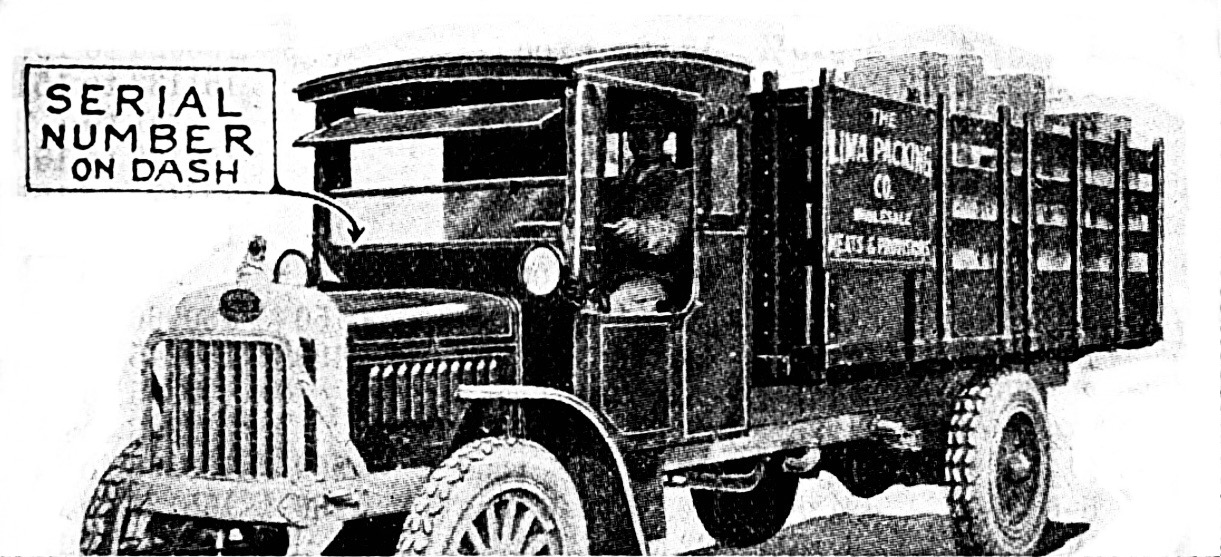
Gramm-Bernstein Company (1925)

Gramm-Bernstein Company, also known as Gramm Motor Car Co. and Gramm Truck Co., was an automobile company in Lima, Ohio, United States, in the early 20th century. The company was an early manufacturer of power wagons and advertised 1, 2, 3, and 5 ton models with "any style of body desired". Vehicles were sold through the Willys-Overland Motors. Gramm received a $1,225,000 order "for trucks said to be for commercial purposes in Great Britain" in 1916. A manufacturing plant was designed by Lima architectural firm McLaughlin & Hulsken.

== History ==
From 1930 to 1935, the Ahrens-Fox Fire Engine Company of Cincinnati, Ohio, had been building its smaller fire engines on chassis made by LeBlond-Schacht Truck Company, also of Cincinnati. But by 1935, Depression-weakened Ahrens-Fox owed Schacht so much money for chassis already supplied, that Schacht refused to supply any more truck chassis to AF. Ahrens-Fox then turned to Gramm Trucks of Lima, Ohio, to supply radiators, hoods, and fenders for its smaller fire trucks. Schacht Trucks bought-out Ahrens-Fox Company in 1936, and AF again began to build fire engines on Schacht chassis. But the Ahrens-Fox with Gramm sheet metal continued to be available until 1939. All of the smaller Ahrens-Fox apparatus of 1939-1940 were on Schacht chassis; Gramm/Ahrens-Fox models were no longer available starting in mid 1939. Schacht and Ahrens-Fox both ceased production of new vehicles in 1940, although Ahrens-Fox resumed production in 1946 and continued to be made until 1958 (but using their own custom chassis, no longer using Gramm or Schacht as suppliers).

From 1937 to 1939, the Bickle Fire Engine Company of Woodstock, Ontario, built fire engines using very similar sheet metal designs to those that Ahrens-Fox was using at that time, and as with Ahrens-Fox, these radiators, hoods, and fenders were also supplied to Bickle by Gramm Trucks of Lima, Ohio. Bickle had been Ahrens-Fox's Canadian sales and service agency from 1923 to 1936; starting in 1936, Bickle was the Canadian sales and service agency for Seagrave Corporation fire engines of Columbus, Ohio.

The Gramm/Ahrens-Fox fire engines had Hercules motors and either Northern or Hale fire pumps, while the Gramm/Bickles used Seagrave motors and pumps. Bickle also made fire engines on Seagrave's own chassis, and on various other commercial truck chassis, at the same time that they were making Gramm/Bickles.

Walt McCall of Windsor, Ontario, Ed Hass of Sacramento, California, and the late Bob Johnson of Peoria, Illinois (the latter was an Ahrens-Fox fire engine salesman from 1923 to 1939) provided the research about the Ahrens-Fox and Bickle connections with Gramm Trucks.

== Overview of production figures ==
Year	Production	Model	Engine displacement	HP
1912				
1913		0.75 t	3.707 cc	
1914				
1915				
1916	39	1 t	4.966 cc	19.6
	111	1,5 t		19.6
	43	2 t		22.5
	134	2,5 t		28.9
	78	3,5 t		32.4
	88	5 t		36.1
		6 t		36.1
1917	145	1 t		19.6
	84	1,5 t		19.6
	107	2 t		22.5
	296	2,5 t		28.9
	270	3,5 t		32.4
	128	5 t		36.1
	Included in 5t	6 t		36.1
1918	28	W1		22.5
	37	W 1,5		22.5
	54	W 2		22.5
	149	W 2,5		28.9
	234	W 3,5		32.4
	95	W 5		36.1
1919	276	15 1,5		22.5
	6	(4) 2		22.5
	102	(4) 2,5		28.9
	70	(4) 3,5		32.4
	28	(4) 5		36.1
1920	71	15		22.5
	64	65		22.5
	123	20		27.23
	46	25		28.9
	80	35		32.4
	24	50		36.1
	19	30		32.4
	Included in 3t	75		32.4
1921		10		19.6
	71	15		22.5
	51	65		22.5
	123	20		27.23
	46	25		28.9
	19	30-75		32.4
	71	35		32.4
	17	50		36.1
1922				
1923	725	10		22.5
		15		22.5
	10934	65		22.5
	100	125		27.23
	1000	30		32.4
	990	40		32.4
	992	50		36.1
		20		27.33
		75 P		32.4
1924				
1925				
1926				
1927				
1928				
1929				
1930				
Sum				
