= Alima Moro =

Ghanaian footballer (born 1983)

Personal information
- Date of birth: 5 February 1983 (age 43)
- Place of birth: Bawku, Ghana
- Height: 1.78 m (5 ft 10 in)
- Position: Goalkeeper

Team information
- Current team: Laghi

Youth career
- Bolga Ghatel

Senior career*
Years	Team	Apps	(Gls)
1999–2005	Bolga Ghatel		
2005–2006	Lighi		
2006–2007	Marostica		
2007–2011	Vicenza		
2011–2013	Trevignano		
2013–201?	Laghi		
201?–2018	Udinese		
2018–2019	Tavagnacco	0	(0)

International career
- Ghana
- * Club domestic league appearances and goals

Alima Moro (born 5 February 1983) is a Ghanaian footballer who plays as a goalkeeper.

== Club career ==
Moro started her soccer career in Bolgatanga-based Bolga Ghatel. In 2005, she left her home country, Ghana, to work in the Ghanaian embassy in Rome, Italy. Moro continued her career in the Serie C at Lighi. After just one season, she moved to Serie B side Marostica. In autumn 2007, she moved to Vicenza. There, Moro became a top performer, which got her a contract in Serie A at Trevignano in 2012. In Serie A, after a strong first season, she did not go beyond the reserve roles and returned to Serie C at the start of the 2013–14 season, playing for Laghi.

Having played for Udinese, Moro signed for Serie A side Tavagnacco for the 2018–19 season, as a third-choice goalkeeper.

== International career ==
Moro played for the Ghana women's national team, between 2011 and 2013. She was excluded from the national team in 2013 after accusing the former coach, A. K. Edusei, of corruption. Moro claimed in an interview with a Ghanaian daily that some of the national team players had their place. In December 2013, she returned to the national team.

== Awards ==
In the 2011–12 season, she was voted the best African footballer in Italy. On 23 October 2013 she was awarded the Ghana-Italy Excellence Awards in Brescia. In addition, she was awarded the best goalkeeper by the Ghana Football Association.

== Futsal ==
In addition to her football career, she played futsal for Fontanafredda Futsal Club Caffé dae Tose in Italy for two years.
