= Lima, Wisconsin =

Lima is the name of multiple locations in the U.S. state of Wisconsin:

- Lima, Grant County, Wisconsin, a town
- Lima, Pepin County, Wisconsin, a town
- Lima, Rock County, Wisconsin, a town
- Lima, Sheboygan County, Wisconsin, a town
- Lima (community), Wisconsin, an unincorporated community in Pepin County
- Lima Center, Wisconsin, an unincorporated community in Rock County
- West Lima, Wisconsin, an unincorporated community in Richland County
- Harrison (town), Calumet County, Wisconsin, was originally known as Lima
