= Aghuzbon, Siahkal =

Aghuzbon آغوزبن
- Village
- Location within Iran
- Coordinates: 37°03′8.352″N 49°54′0.353″E
- Country: Iran
- Province: Gilan
- County: Siahkal
- Bakhsh: Central
- Rural District: Tutaki

Population (2016)
  - Total: 16
- Time zone: UTC+3:30 (IRST)

Aghuzbon (Persian: آغوزبن, also Romanized as Āghūzbon) is a village in Tutaki Rural District, in the Central District of Siahkal County, Gilan Province, Iran. At the 2016 census, its population was 16, in 8 families. Decreased from 38 people in 2006.
