= Aghuzbon, Savadkuh =

Aghuzben آغوزبن
- village
- Interactive map of Aghuzben
- Coordinates: 36°13′50.1″N 52°43′13.1″E
- Country: Iran
- Province: Mazandaran
- County: North Savadkuh
- Rural District: Lafur

Population (2016)
  - Total: 89
- Time zone: UTC+3:30 (IRST)

Aghuzben (Persian: آغوزبن, also Romanized as Āghūzben) is a village in Lafur Rural District, North Savadkuh County, Mazandaran Province, Iran. At the 2016 census, its population was 89, in 31 families. Increased from 42 people in 2006.
