= Koshkuh, Fars =

Koshkuh كشكوه
- Village
- Country: Iran
- Province: Fars
- County: Larestan
- Bakhsh: Sahray-ye Bagh
- Rural District: Sahray-ye Bagh

Population (2006)
  - Total: 124
- Time zone: UTC+3:30 (IRST)
  - Summer (DST): UTC+4:30 (IRDT)

Koshkuh (Persian: كشكوه, also Romanized as Koshkūh) is a village in Sahray-ye Bagh Rural District, Sahray-ye Bagh District, Larestan County, Fars province, Iran. At the 2006 census, its population was 124, in 28 families.
