= Buba Baldeh =

Gambian politician and journalist (1953–2014)

Buba Sidiki Michael Baldeh (11 November 1953 - 8 July 2014) was a Gambian politician, journalist and editor. He was a former managing editor of The Daily Observer, a Gambian daily newspaper, from 2000 to 2002. Baldeh was also a former member of the National Assembly of the Gambia from 1982 to 1985 and 1987-1994 during the first Gambian republic. Buba was Minister of Youths and Sports during the first Republic, from 1992 to 1994, and held several posts after the 1994 coup d'état until his falling out with the then President of The Republic of The Gambia, Yahya Jammeh.

== Early life ==
Baldeh was born in Basse Mansajang, Upper River Division, Gambia. His father, Michael Baldeh, was a member of the House of Representatives (now called National Assembly of the Gambia) during the British colonial period.

== Early career ==
Baldeh started his career working for the district commissioner of Gambia from 1972 to 1977. He was later designated the role of project director for the Freedom From Hunger Campaign in 1977.

== Political career ==
In 1982, Baldeh was elected to the House of Representatives but was ousted out in 1985. He was reelected to the House of Representatives in 1987 and became the secretary for the Ministry of Health in 1990. Baldeh also held the portfolio of Minister of Youth and Sports from 1992 until 1994. His tenure as an MP ended with the 1994 Gambian coup d'état.

== Arrest ==
During the 1994 coup by Yahya Jammeh, Baldeh aligned himself with the APRC party. However, his relationship with the APRC weakened after he was arrested by the National Intelligence Agency in 2004. Baldeh was exonerated of the charges in June 2005.

== Exile ==
After an attempted coup by Ndure Chum in 2006, Baldeh moved and lived in exile in Senegal from 2006 until his death in 2014. He died in Dakar, Senegal, on 8 July 2014 from stomach pains. The former president Jammeh denied Baldeh from being buried in The country. He was buried In Madina Gounass, Senegal.
