= Lima Stadium =

- U.S. National Register of Historic Places
- A view of the stadium stands before the restoration

- Location within Ohio Location within the United States
- Location: Lima, Ohio
- Coordinates: 40°44′24.6″N 84°5′28.7″W
- Architect: McLaughlin Thomas D & Assoc; Green & Sawyer
- NRHP reference No.: 02000219
- Added to NRHP: 2002-03-21

Lima Stadium, built in the 1930s, is a historic stadium in Lima, Ohio. It was listed on the National Register of Historic Places in 2002. Its significance is listed as its architecture. Its historic and current use is a sports facility. It is the only high school stadium in Ohio to be recognized as a historic landmark. Currently it is the stadium of the Lima Senior Spartans, the Lima Central Catholic Thunderbirds, and the Lima Warriors.
