= Shuil Rural District =

Rural district in Gilan province, Iran

Shuil Rural District Persian: دهستان شوئيل
- Rural District
- Location within Iran
- Coordinates: 36°45′N 50°11′E
- Country: Iran
- Province: Gilan
- County: Rudsar
- District: Rahimabad
- Established: 1987
- Capital: Shuil

Population (2016)
  - Total: 3,657
- Time zone: UTC+3:30 (IRST)

Shuil Rural District (Persian: دهستان شوئيل) is in Rahimabad District of Rudsar County, Gilan province, Iran. Its capital is the village of Shuil.

== Demographics ==
=== Population ===
At the time of the 2006 National Census, the rural district's population was 3,146 in 938 households. There were 2,106 inhabitants in 848 households at the following census of 2011. The 2016 census measured the population of the rural district as 3,657 in 1,353 households. The most populous of its 57 villages was Tukas, with 335 people.

=== Other villages in the rural district ===
- Ayzdin
- Berm Kuh
- Lasbu
- Lat Rud
- Pi Aghuzbon
- Risan
- Rum Dasht
- Saravarsu
- Shafiabad
- Sheram Dasht
- Soluk Bon-e Sofla
