= Eshkevar-e Olya and Siyarastaq Yeylaq Rural District =

Rural district in Gilan province, Iran

Eshkevar-e Olya and Siyarastaq Yeylaq Rural District Persian: دهستان اشکور عليا و سيارستاق ييلاقي
- Rural District
- Location within Iran
- Coordinates: 36°43′N 50°21′E
- Country: Iran
- Province: Gilan
- County: Rudsar
- District: Rahimabad
- Established: 1987
- Capital: Sarem

Population (2016)
  - Total: 2,864
- Time zone: UTC+3:30 (IRST)

Eshkevar-e Olya and Siyarastaq Yeylaq Rural District (Persian: دهستان اشکور عليا و سيارستاق ييلاقي) (Note: Formerly Siyarastaq Yeylaq Rural District (دهستان سيارستاق ييلاقي)) is in Rahimabad District of Rudsar County, Gilan province, Iran. Its capital is the village of Sarem.

== Demographics ==
=== Population ===
At the time of the 2006 National Census, the rural district's population was 2,478 in 795 households. There were 1,672 inhabitants in 649 households at the following census of 2011. The 2016 census measured the population of the rural district as 2,864 in 1,058 households. The most populous of its 58 villages was Lashkan, with 234 people.

=== Other villages in the rural district ===
- Dargah
- Giri
- Keshayeh
- Pudeh
- Sezarud
- Siyarastaq
- Vishki
