= Eshkevar-e Sofla Rural District =

Rural district in Gilan province, Iran

Eshkevar-e Sofla Rural District Persian: دهستان اشكور سفلي
- Rural District
- Location within Iran
- Coordinates: 36°52′N 50°17′E
- Country: Iran
- Province: Gilan
- County: Rudsar
- District: Rahimabad
- Established: 1987
- Capital: Ziaz

Population (2016)
  - Total: 5,012
- Time zone: UTC+3:30 (IRST)

Eshkevar-e Sofla Rural District (Persian: دهستان اشكور سفلي) is in Rahimabad District of Rudsar County, Gilan province, Iran. Its capital is the village of Ziaz.

== Demographics ==
=== Population ===
At the time of the 2006 National Census, the rural district's population was 4,842 in 1,448 households. There were 4,446 inhabitants in 1,524 households at the following census of 2011. The 2016 census measured the population of the rural district as 5,012 in 1,801 households. The most populous of its 49 villages was Aghuzbon Kand Sar, with 627 people.

=== Other villages in the rural district ===
- Bala Lam Beshkest
- Gereh Govabar
- Kakerud
- Khorasan Poshteh
- Lima
- Nilu
- Sajiran
- Shuk
