= Rahimabad Rural District =

Rural district in Gilan province, Iran

Rahimabad Rural District Persian: دهستان رحيم آباد
- Rural District
- Location within Iran
- Coordinates: 36°58′N 50°17′E
- Country: Iran
- Province: Gilan
- County: Rudsar
- District: Rahimabad
- Established: 1987
- Capital: Tul Lat

Population (2016)
  - Total: 8,062
- Time zone: UTC+3:30 (IRST)

Rahimabad Rural District (Persian: دهستان رحيم آباد) is in Rahimabad District of Rudsar County, Gilan province, Iran. Its capital is the village of Tul Lat.

== Demographics ==
=== Population ===
At the time of the 2006 National Census, the rural district's population was 10,193 in 2,597 households. There were 9,407 inhabitants in 2,673 households at the following census of 2011. The 2016 census measured the population of the rural district as 8,062 in 2,585 households. The most populous of its 53 villages was Tul Lat, with 1,027 people.

=== Other villages in the rural district ===
- Azar Key
- Bazneshin-e Olya
- Bazneshin-e Sofla
- Karbas Saray-e Sofla
- Khompateh Arbu Sara
- Kushkuh
- Latak
