= Rahimabad District =

District in Gilan province, Iran

Rahimabad District Persian: بخش رحیم‌آباد
- District
- Location within Iran
- Coordinates: 36°50′N 50°16′E
- Country: Iran
- Province: Gilan
- County: Rudsar
- Capital: Rahimabad

Population (2016)
  - Total: 30,166
- Time zone: UTC+3:30 (IRST)

Rahimabad District (Persian: بخش رحیم‌آباد) is in Rudsar County, Gilan province, Iran. Its capital is the city of Rahimabad.

== History ==
A large earthquake struck the district on 28 November 1933. The 6.3-Richter-magnitude earthquake was reported to have resulted in at least four deaths, as well as numerous injuries.

== Demographics ==
=== Population ===
At the time of the 2006 National Census, the district's population was 27,653 in 7,820 households. The following census in 2011 counted 26,350 people in 8,418 households. The 2016 census measured the population of the district as 30,166 inhabitants in 10,304 households.

=== Administrative divisions ===
Rahimabad District Population
Administrative Divisions	2006	2011	2016
Eshkevar-e Olya and Siyarastaq Yeylaq RD (Note: Formerly Siyarastaq Yeylaq Rural District)	2,478	1,672	2,864
Eshkevar-e Sofla RD	4,842	4,446	5,012
Rahimabad RD	10,193	9,407	8,062
Shuil RD	3,146	2,106	3,657
Rahimabad (city)	6,994	8,719	10,571
Total	27,653	26,350	30,166
RD = Rural District
