= Espeyli =

Espeyli mahale اسپیلی‌محله
- Village
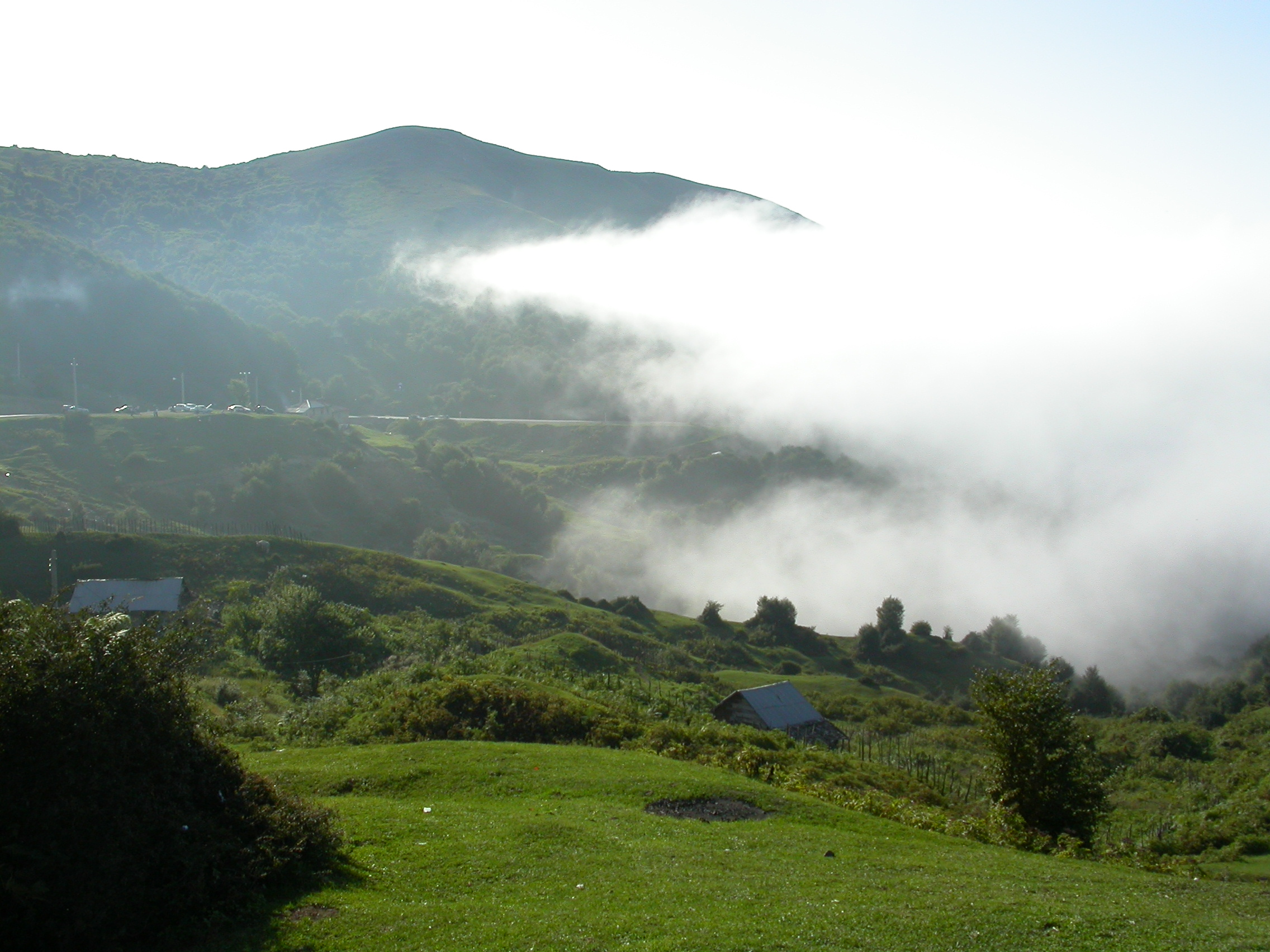

- Location within Iran
- Coordinates: 36°54′17″N 49°54′50″E
- Country: Iran
- Province: Gilan
- County: Siahkal
- Bakhsh: Deylaman
- Rural District: Deylaman

Population (2006)
  - Total: 347
- Time zone: UTC+3:30 (IRST)

Espeyli (Persian: اسپیلی‌محله, also Romanized as Espeylī; also known as Esbeylī, Esopeylī, Isbaili, and Isbayli) is a suburb of Deylaman city and a village in Deylaman Rural District, Deylaman District, Siahkal County, Gilan Province, Iran. It is north of Deylaman city center.

== Geography ==
Espeyli is located north of Deylaman city and approximately 40 km (25 mi) south of Siahkal. Its location in Alborz mountains and Deylaman heights gives it a cool and pleasant weather in summer while winters are very cold and snowy.

== Demographics ==
At the 2006 census, Espeyli's population was 347 people, in 96 households. The residential area of the village was annexed to Deylaman city's urban area between 2006 and 2011. People of the village speak Gilaki language.
