= Leyeh =

Leyeh or Liyeh (Persian: ليه) may refer to:

- Liyeh, Gilan
- Leyeh, Mazandaran

== See also ==
- Liyeh Chak, Pir Kuh
