= Niavol =

Niavol نیاۆل
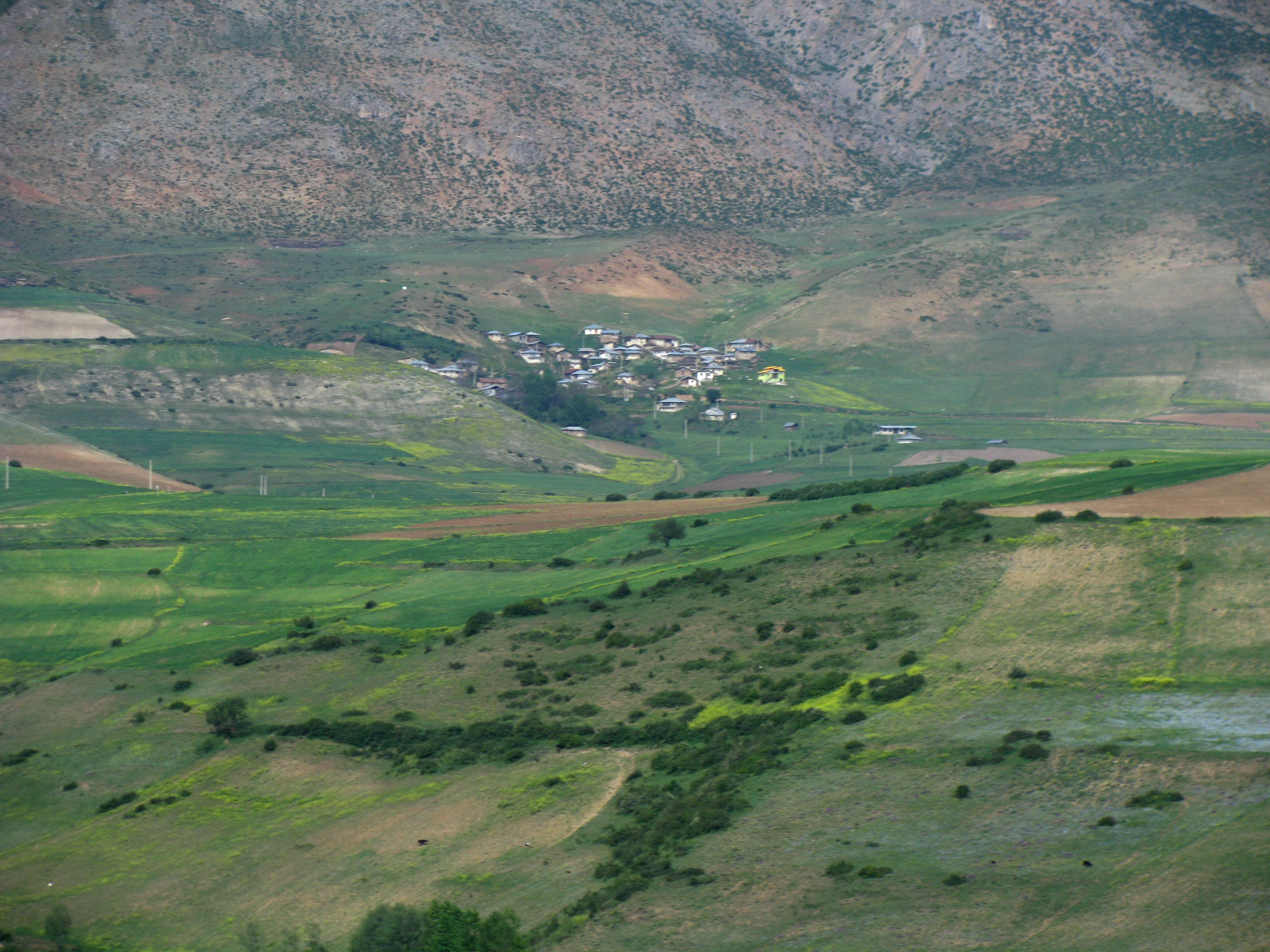

- Location within Iran
- Coordinates: 36°54′24″N 49°58′29″E
- Country: Iran
- Province: Gilan
- County: Siahkal
- Bakhsh: Deylaman
- Rural District: Deylaman

Population (2016)
  - Total: 98
- Time zone: UTC+3:30 (IRST)

Niavol (Persian: نیاۆل, also Romanized as Nīāvol, Neyavol, Niavel) is a village in Deylaman district of Siahkal County in Gilan Province, Iran. At the 2016 census, its population was 98, in 40 families, up from 92 people in 2006.

The Niyavel region has a hot, dry climate in summers and mild mountainous winters. The area ends in the Sidsara region from the northwest and in the Ashurabad region from the south, and is one of the communication highways between the north and the southwest and is considered the oldest passageway between these regions. The products of this region are wheat, walnuts, hazelnuts, dairy products and honey, and the occupation of the residents is agriculture.

The Niyavel region and neighboring southwestern regions and cities such as (Deyalman, Rudbar, Alamut, and the city of Lahijan) are considered the center of the Kurdish people settlement of Amarlu in Gilan province.

After the emergence of Islam, while the entire territory of Iran and the Middle East and parts of Rome fell into the hands of the Arabs, in the Alborz Mountains, the people of Dilmistan and Tabaristan did not allow the Arabs into their land and preserved their independence. It was registered as one of the national monuments of Iran on 12 January 2007 with registration number 20441.

In the 20th century, the Daylamian were considered a strong barrier against the Arabs. Today, these tribes are still present in the southern regions of Gilan Province.

== Demographics ==
=== Population ===
Niyavol Population history
Year	Pop.	±%
1956	83	—
1966	128	+54.2%
1976	117	−8.6%
1986	161	+37.6%
2006	92	−42.9%
2011	47	−48.9%
2016	98	+108.5%

At the 1966 census, Niavol was in Deylaman Rural District, in Siahkal District of Lahijan County, with a population of 128 people in 27 households. It had mosque. Its agricultural products have been wheat, barley and lentil.

The 1976 census measured a population of 117 people in 29 households. Niavol had elementary school at the time of the census. In 1986, Niavol's population reached 161 people in 30 households.

The rural District was transferred to Deylaman District of Siahkal County in 1997.

== Related searches ==
- List of Kurdish villages in Iran
