= Baba Vali =

Baba Vali باباولی
- Village
- Location within Iran
- Coordinates: 36°51′43″N 49°54′18″E
- Country: Iran
- Province: Gilan
- County: Siahkal
- Bakhsh: Deylaman
- Rural District: Deylaman

Population (2006)
  - Total: 62
- Time zone: UTC+3:30 (IRST)

Baba Vali (Persian: باباولی, also Romanized as Bābā Valī and Bābāwāli) is a village in Deylaman Rural District, Deylaman District, Siahkal County, Gilan Province, Iran. At the 2016 census, its population was 42, in 16 families. Down from 62 people in 2006.
