= Raz Darreh =

Raz Darreh رزدره
- Village
- Location within Iran
- Coordinates: 36°53′29″N 49°52′25″E
- Country: Iran
- Province: Gilan
- County: Siahkal
- Bakhsh: Deylaman
- Rural District: Deylaman

Population (2006)
  - Total: 84
- Time zone: UTC+3:30 (IRST)

Raz Darreh (Persian: رزدره; also known as Razdarrekh and Zardarreh) is a village in Deylaman Rural District, Deylaman District, Siahkal County, Gilan Province, Iran. At the 2016 census, its population was 57, in 24 families. Down from 84 people in 2006.
