= Lur (disambiguation) =

A lur is a long natural blowing horn without finger holes that is played with a brass-type embouchure.

LUR or Lur may also refer to:

- Lur (deity), an Etruscan deity
- Lur, Iran (disambiguation), several places in Iran
- Atlantis Armenian Airlines (ICAO: LUR), a defunct Armenian airline
- Cape Lisburne LRRS Airport (IATA: LUR), a military airport located in Cape Lisburne, Alaska, United States
- Latur railway station (Indian Railways station code: LUR), a railway station in Maharashtra, India
- Laura language (ISO 639-3: lur), an Austronesian language spoken on Sumba, Indonesia

== See also ==
- Lurs, an ethnic group
- Lrrr, a Futurama character Lrrr
- Lour (disambiguation)
- Lure (disambiguation)
