= Estalakh Kian =

Estalakh Kian اسطلخ كيان
- Village
- Location within Iran
- Coordinates: 36°51′53″N 49°49′20″E
- Country: Iran
- Province: Gilan
- County: Siahkal
- Bakhsh: Deylaman
- Rural District: Deylaman

Population (2006)
  - Total: 34
- Time zone: UTC+3:30 (IRST)

Estalakh Kian (Persian: اسطلخ كيان, also romanized as Esţalakh Kīān) is a village in Deylaman Rural District, Deylaman District, Siahkal County, Gilan Province, Iran. At the 2016 census, its population was 24, in 9 families. Down from 34 in 2006.
