= Khak Shur =

Khak Shur خاک شور
- Village
- Location within Iran
- Coordinates: 36°52′20″N 49°51′21″E
- Country: Iran
- Province: Gilan
- County: Siahkal
- Bakhsh: Deylaman
- Rural District: Deylaman

Population (2006)
  - Total: 18
- Time zone: UTC+3:30 (IRST)

Khak Shur (Persian: خاک شور, also Romanized as Khāk Shūr and Khakshūr) is a village in Deylaman Rural District, Deylaman District, Siahkal County, Gilan Province, Iran. At the 2016 census, its population was 9, in 4 families. Decreased from 18 people in 2006.
