= Sivasarak =

Sivasarak سيوسرک
- Village
- Interactive map of Sivasarak
- Coordinates: 36°53′34.296″N 49°51′15.2748″E
- Country: Iran
- Province: Gilan
- County: Siahkal
- Bakhsh: Deylaman
- Rural District: Deylaman

Population (2006)
  - Total: 21
- Time zone: UTC+3:30 (IRST)

Sivasarak (Persian: سيوسرک, also Romanized as Sīvasarak) is a village in Deylaman Rural District, Deylaman District, Siahkal County, Gilan Province, Iran. At the 2016 census, its population was 19, in 8 families.
