= Cheshna Sar =

Cheshna Sar چشناسر
- Village
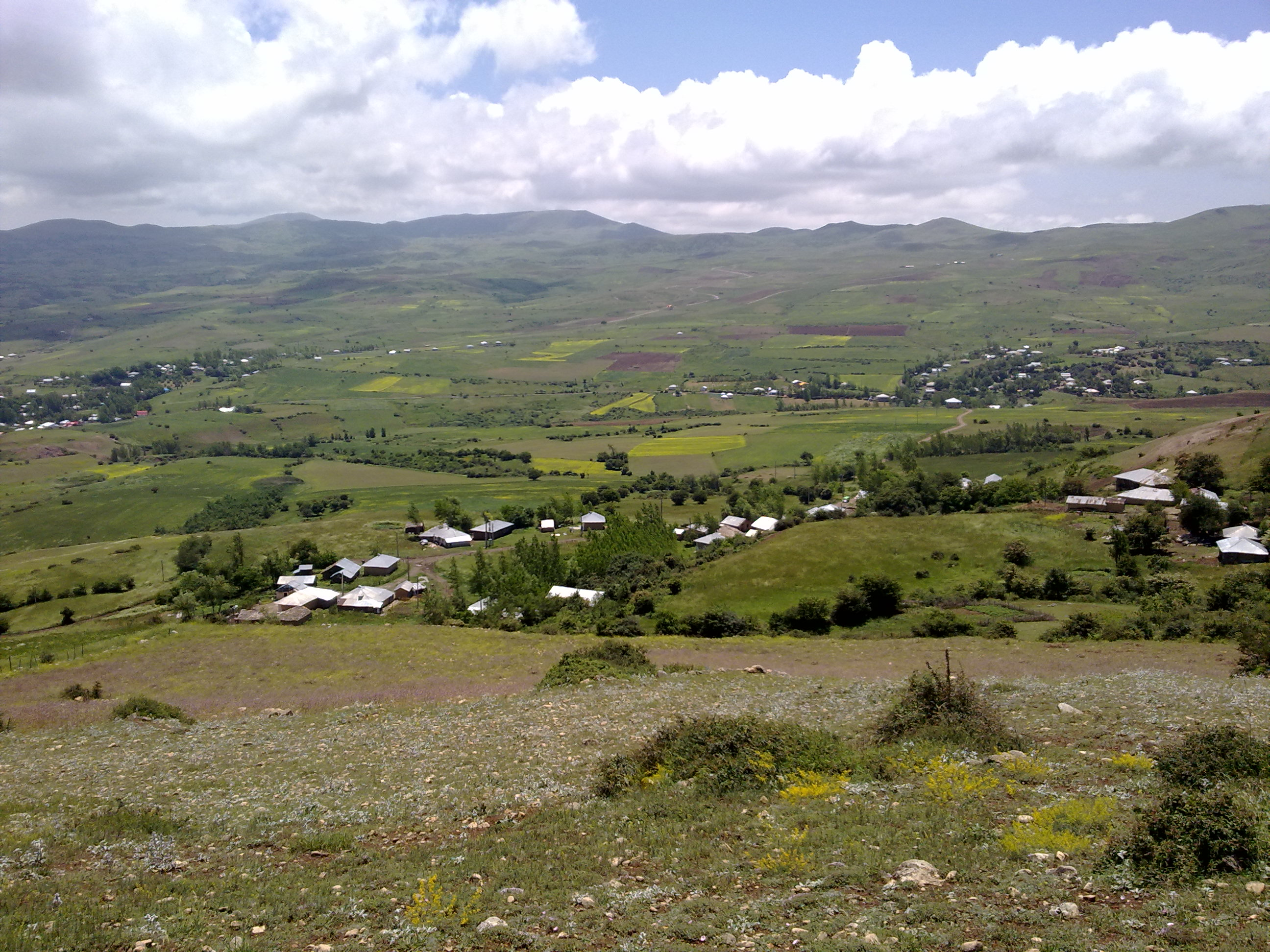

- Location within Iran
- Coordinates: 36°52′24″N 49°49′29″E
- Country: Iran
- Province: Gilan
- County: Siahkal
- Bakhsh: Deylaman
- Rural District: Deylaman

Population (2006)
  - Total: 56
- Time zone: UTC+3:30 (IRST)

Cheshna Sar (Persian: چشناسر, also Romanized as Cheshnā Sar and Cheshnāsar) is a village in Deylaman Rural District, Deylaman District, Siahkal County, Gilan Province, Iran. At the 2016 census, its population was 37, in 11 families. Down from 56 people in 2006.
