= Zin Poshteh =

Zin Poshteh زين پشته
- Village
- Location within Iran
- Coordinates: 36°47′43″N 49°54′35″E
- Country: Iran
- Province: Gilan
- County: Siahkal
- Bakhsh: Deylaman
- Rural District: Deylaman

Population (2006)
  - Total: 44
- Time zone: UTC+3:30 (IRST)

Zin Poshteh (Persian: زين پشته, also Romanized as Zīn Poshteh; also known as Zīneh Poshteh) is a village in Deylaman Rural District, Deylaman District, Siahkal County, Gilan Province, Iran. At the 2016 census, its population was 21, in 8 families. Decreased from 44 people in 2006.
