= Lour =

Lour may refer to:

- Lord Lour, an extinct title in the Peerage of Scotland superseded by that of Earl of Northesk
- Lour., taxonomic author abbreviation of João de Loureiro (1717–1791) was a Portuguese Jesuit missionary and botanist

== See also ==
- Lour Escale (arrondissement), arrondissement of Koungheul in Kaffrine Region in Senegal
- Loures, city and a municipality in Portugal
- Loor (disambiguation)
- Lor (disambiguation)
- Lore (disambiguation)
- Lur (disambiguation)
- Lure (disambiguation)
