= Pishkeli Jan =

Pishkeli Jan (Persian: پيشكليجان), also rendered as Peshgel Jan, may refer to:

- Pishkeli Jan-e Bala
- Pishkeli Jan-e Pain
