= Sufian Sar =

Village in Gilan, Iran

Sufian Sar صوفيان سر
- Village
- Location within Iran
- Coordinates: 36°54′45″N 49°53′21″E
- Country: Iran
- Province: Gilan
- County: Siahkal
- Bakhsh: Deylaman
- Rural District: Deylaman

Population (2016)
  - Total: 22
- Time zone: UTC+3:30 (IRST)

Sufian Sar (Persian: صوفيان سر, also Romanized as Şūfīān Sar; also known as Sūfūn Sar) is a village in Deylaman Rural District, Deylaman District, Siahkal County, Gilan Province, Iran. At the 2006 census, its population was 22, in 8 families. Up from 12 people in 2006.
