= Tokam =

Tokam تكام
- Village
- Location within Iran
- Coordinates: 36°49′59″N 49°57′57″E
- Country: Iran
- Province: Gilan
- County: Siahkal
- Bakhsh: Deylaman
- Rural District: Deylaman

Population (2006)
  - Total: 131
- Time zone: UTC+3:30 (IRST)

Tokam (Persian: تكام, also Romanized as Tokām and Takam) is a village in Deylaman Rural District, Deylaman District, Siahkal County, Gilan Province, Iran. At the 2016 census, its population was 98, in 43 families. Down from 131 people in 2006.
