= Darvish Khani =

Darvish Khani درویش خانی
- Village
- Interactive map of Darvish Khani
- Coordinates: 36°52′35″N 49°49′58″E
- Country: Iran
- Province: Gilan
- County: Siahkal
- Bakhsh: Deylaman
- Rural District: Deylaman

Population (2016)
  - Total: 28
- Time zone: UTC+3:30 (IRST)

Darvish Khani (Persian: درويش خانی, also Romanized as Darvīsh Khānī) is a village in Deylaman Rural District, Deylaman District, Siahkal County, Gilan Province, Iran. At the 2016 census, its population was 28, in 9 families.
