= Tolum Khani =

Tolum Khani تلوم خانی
- Village
- Interactive map of Tolum Khani
- Coordinates: 36°51′22″N 49°56′20″E
- Country: Iran
- Province: Gilan
- County: Siahkal
- Bakhsh: Deylaman
- Rural District: Deylaman

Population (2006)
  - Total: 13
- Time zone: UTC+3:30 (IRST)

Tolum Khani (Persian: تلوم‌خانی, also Romanized as Tolūm Khānī) is a village in Deylaman Rural District, Deylaman District, Siahkal County, Gilan Province, Iran. At the 2016 census, its population was 10, in 4 families.
