= Pilbur =

Pilabur پيلابور
- Village
- Location within Iran
- Coordinates: 36°53′11″N 49°50′46″E
- Country: Iran
- Province: Gilan
- County: Siahkal
- Bakhsh: Deylaman
- Rural District: Deylaman

Population (2006)
  - Total: 18
- Time zone: UTC+3:30 (IRST)

Pilbur (Persian: پيلبور, also Romanized as Pīlbūr; also known as Pīleh Bar and Pīleh Par) is a village in Deylaman Rural District, Deylaman District, Siahkal County, Gilan Province, Iran. At the 2006 census, its population was 18, in 8 families.

In 2016, there were less than 4 households residing in Pilbur.
