= Mian Marz =

Mian Marz ميان مرز
- Village
- Location within Iran
- Coordinates: 36°51′09″N 49°47′33″E
- Country: Iran
- Province: Gilan
- County: Siahkal
- Bakhsh: Deylaman
- Rural District: Deylaman

Population (2006)
  - Total: 95
- Time zone: UTC+3:30 (IRST)

Mian Marz (Persian: ميان مرز, also Romanized as Mīān Marz) is a village in Deylaman Rural District, Deylaman District, Siahkal County, Gilan Province, Iran. At the 2016 census, its population was 76, in 25 families. Down from 95 people in 2006.
