= Pash (disambiguation) =

Pash (1950–1988) was an Indian poet.

Pash may also refer to:

- Pash, a passionate romantic kiss, see French kiss
- Pash (album), a 1998 album by Kate Ceberano
- "Pash" (song), a 1997 song by Kate Ceberano
- Pash (software), a PowerShell open source reimplementation
- Pash, Iran (disambiguation), places in Iran
- Pash, an obsolete term for Easter

People with the surname Pash:

- Boris Pash (1900–1995), United States Army officer
- Jeff Pash (1916–2005), Australian rules footballer
- Jim Pash (1948–2005), American musician and recording artist
- Florence Pash (1862–1951), British portrait painter
- Martin Pash (1883–1920), Australian rules footballer

PASH may refer to:

- Shishmaref Airport, by ICAO designation PASH
- Pseudoangiomatous stromal hyperplasia, a proliferation of breast mesenchyme of uncertain significance
- PASH!, a Japanese magazine
- PASH (band), a pop rock band from Adelaide, South Australia
