= Pelleh Shah =

Pelleh Shah پله شاه
- Village
- Location within Iran
- Coordinates: 36°51′35″N 49°51′28″E
- Country: Iran
- Province: Gilan
- County: Siahkal
- Bakhsh: Deylaman
- Rural District: Deylaman

Population (2006)
  - Total: 29
- Time zone: UTC+3:30 (IRST)

Pelleh Shah (Persian: پله شاه, also Romanized as Pelleh Shāh; also known as Pīleh Shāh) is a village in Deylaman Rural District, Deylaman District, Siahkal County, Gilan Province, Iran. At the 2016 census, its population was 38, in 14 families. Up from 29 in 2006.
