= Talesh Kuh =

Talesh Kuh طالشكوه
- Village
- Location within Iran
- Coordinates: 36°53′25″N 49°49′54″E
- Country: Iran
- Province: Gilan
- County: Siahkal
- Bakhsh: Deylaman
- Rural District: Deylaman

Population (2006)
  - Total: 39
- Time zone: UTC+3:30 (IRST)

Talesh Kuh (Persian: طالشكوه, also Romanized as Ţālesh Kūh; also known as Ţālesh Kūl) is a village in Deylaman Rural District, Deylaman District, Siahkal County, Gilan Province, Iran. At the 2016 census, its population was 26, in 8 families. Down from 39 people in 2006.
