= Ishku =

Ishku (Persian: ايشكو), also rendered as Ayshakhku or Ishekuh or Ishkuh may refer to:

- Ishku-ye Bala
- Ishku-ye Pain
