= Pir Kuh =

Pir Kuh (Persian: پيركوه) may refer to:

- Pir Kuh-e Olya
- Pir Kuh-e Sofla
- Pir Kuh Rural District
