= Azarestanak =

Azarestanak آزارستانک
- Village
- Location within Iran
- Coordinates: 36°53′50″N 49°51′58″E
- Country: Iran
- Province: Gilan
- County: Siahkal
- Bakhsh: Deylaman
- Rural District: Deylaman

Population (2006)
  - Total: 36
- Time zone: UTC+3:30 (IRST)

Azarestanak (Persian: آزارستانک, also Romanized as Āzārestānak; also known as Āzārestān) is a village in Deylaman Rural District, Deylaman District, Siahkal County, Gilan Province, Iran. At the 2016 census, its population was 16, in 6 families. Decreased from 36 people in 2006.
