= Koshti Girchak =

Village in Gilan province, Iran

Koshti Girchak Persian: كشتی گيرچاک
- Village
- Location within Iran
- Coordinates: 36°51′09″N 49°48′24″E
- Country: Iran
- Province: Gilan
- County: Siahkal
- District: Deylaman
- Rural District: Deylaman

Population (2016)
  - Total: 158
- Time zone: UTC+3:30 (IRST)

Koshti Girchak (Persian: كشتی گيرچاک) (Note: Also romanized as Koshtīgīr Chāk and Koshtī Gīrchāk; also known as Koshtī Gīchāk) is a village in Deylaman Rural District of Deylaman District in Siahkal County, Gilan province, Iran.

== Demographics ==
=== Population ===
At the time of the 2006 National Census, the village's population was 178 in 47 households. The following census in 2011 counted 156 people in 47 households. The 2016 census measured the population of the village as 158 people in 54 households.
