= Kuh Pas =

Village in Gilan province, Iran

Kuh Pas Persian: كوه پس
- Village
- Location within Iran
- Coordinates: 36°54′07″N 49°57′09″E
- Country: Iran
- Province: Gilan
- County: Siahkal
- District: Deylaman
- Rural District: Deylaman

Population (2016)
  - Total: 486
- Time zone: UTC+3:30 (IRST)

Kuh Pas (Persian: كوه پس) (Note: Also romanized as Kūh Pas; also known as Kupys) is a village in Deylaman Rural District of Deylaman District in Siahkal County, Gilan province, Iran.

== Demographics ==
=== Population ===
At the time of the 2006 National Census, the village's population was 553 in 156 households. The following census in 2011 counted 496 people in 166 households. The 2016 census measured the population of the village as 486 people in 180 households. It was the most populous village in its rural district.
