= Sardsar-e Shahi Jan =

Sardsar-e Shahi Jan سردسر شاهی جان
- Village
- Location within Iran
- Coordinates: 36°45′06″N 50°05′05″E
- Country: Iran
- Province: Gilan
- County: Siahkal
- Bakhsh: Deylaman
- Rural District: Pir Kuh

Population (2016)
  - Total: 22
- Time zone: UTC+3:30 (IRST)

Sardsar-e Shahi Jan (Persian: سردسر شاهی جان, also Romanized as Sardsar-e Shāhī Jān; also known as Shāhī Jān and Shāh Jān) is a village in Pir Kuh Rural District, Deylaman District, Siahkal County, Gilan Province, Iran. At the 2016 census, its population was 22, in 9 families. Decreased from 58 people in 2006.
