= Garmavar =

Village in Gilan province, Iran

Garmavar Persian: گرماور
- Village
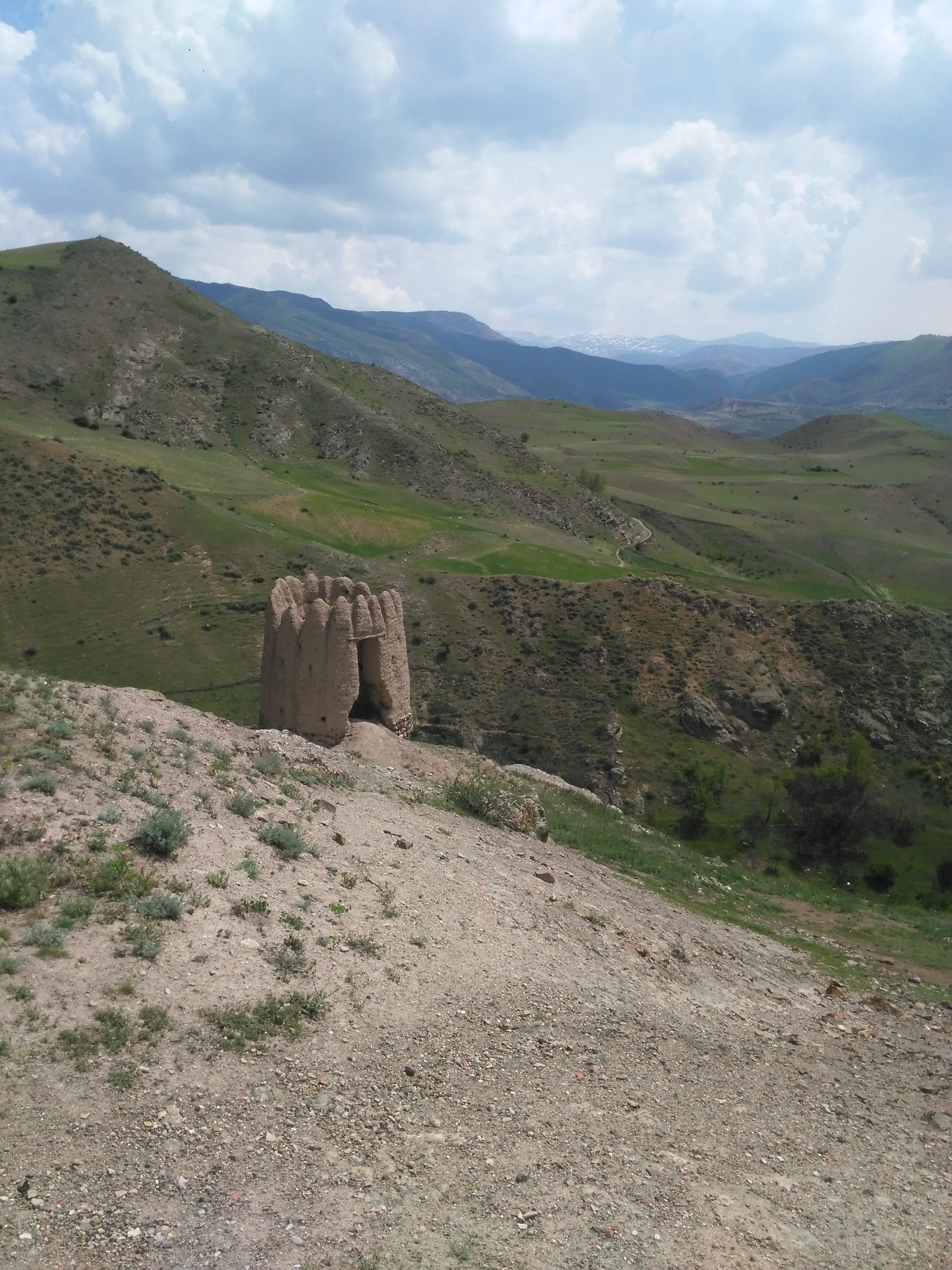
- Tower in the village of Garmavar

- Location within Iran
- Coordinates: 36°51′36″N 50°01′32″E
- Country: Iran
- Province: Gilan
- County: Siahkal
- District: Deylaman
- Rural District: Pir Kuh

Population (2016)
  - Total: 120
- Time zone: UTC+3:30 (IRST)

Garmavar (Persian: گرماور) (Note: Also romanized as Garmāvar) is a village in Pir Kuh Rural District of Deylaman District in Siahkal County, Gilan province, Iran.

== Demographics ==
=== Population ===
At the time of the 2006 National Census, the village's population was 152 in 35 households. The following census in 2011 counted 123 people in 34 households. The 2016 census measured the population of the village as 120 people in 39 households.
