= Komoni, Iran =

Village in Gilan province, Iran

Komoni Persian: کمنی
- Village
- Location within Iran
- Coordinates: 36°43′09″N 50°03′57″E
- Country: Iran
- Province: Gilan
- County: Siahkal
- District: Deylaman
- Rural District: Pir Kuh

Population (2016)
  - Total: 148
- Time zone: UTC+3:30 (IRST)

Komoni (Persian: كمني) (Note: Also romanized as Kamnī, Komeni, and Komonī; also known as Kumani) is a village in Pir Kuh Rural District of Deylaman District in Siahkal County, Gilan province, Iran.

== Demographics ==
=== Population ===
At the time of the 2006 National Census, the village's population was 192 in 50 households. The following census in 2011 counted 161 people in 53 households. The 2016 census measured the population of the village as 148 people in 49 households.
