= Lardeh, Siahkal =

Lardeh لرده
- Village
- Location within Iran
- Coordinates: 36°45′22″N 50°04′10″E
- Country: Iran
- Province: Gilan
- County: Siahkal
- Bakhsh: Deylaman
- Rural District: Pir Kuh

Population (2016)
  - Total: 81
- Time zone: UTC+3:30 (IRST)

Lardeh (Persian: لرده) is a village in Pir Kuh Rural District, Deylaman District, Siahkal County, Gilan Province, Iran. At the 2016 census, its population was 81, in 32 families. Down from 129 people in 2006.
