= Yareshlaman =

Village in Gilan province, Iran

Yareshlaman Persian: يرشلمان
- Village
- Location within Iran
- Coordinates: 36°47′17″N 50°03′36″E
- Country: Iran
- Province: Gilan
- County: Siahkal
- District: Deylaman
- Rural District: Pir Kuh

Population (2016)
  - Total: 149
- Time zone: UTC+3:30 (IRST)

Yareshlaman (Persian: يرشلمان) (Note: Also romanized as Yareshlamān; also known as Yareshlamān-e Bālā) is a village in Pir Kuh Rural District of Deylaman District in Siahkal County, Gilan province, Iran.

== Demographics ==
=== Population ===
At the time of the 2006 National Census, the village's population was 169 in 44 households. The following census in 2011 counted 169 people in 54 households. The 2016 census measured the population of the village as 149 people in 49 households.
