= Gilakash =

Gilakash گيلاكش
- Village
- Location within Iran
- Coordinates: 36°43′50″N 50°04′58″E
- Country: Iran
- Province: Gilan
- County: Siahkal
- Bakhsh: Deylaman
- Rural District: Pir Kuh

Population (2016)
  - Total: 70
- Time zone: UTC+3:30 (IRST)

Gilakash (Persian: گيلاكش, also Romanized as Gīlākesh; also known as Gilarkash) is a village in Pir Kuh Rural District, Deylaman District, Siahkal County, Gilan Province, Iran. At the 2016 census, its population was 70, in 25 families. Decreased from 124 people in 2006.
