= Vasmeh Jan =

Vasmeh Jan وسمه جان
- Village
- Location within Iran
- Coordinates: 36°48′02″N 50°02′58″E
- Country: Iran
- Province: Gilan
- County: Siahkal
- Bakhsh: Deylaman
- Rural District: Pir Kuh

Population (2016)
  - Total: 87
- Time zone: UTC+3:30 (IRST)

Vasmeh Jan (Persian: وسمه جان, also Romanized as Vasmeh Jān; also known as Vasmjān and Vasmjān-e Pā’īn) is a village in Pir Kuh Rural District, Deylaman District, Siahkal County, Gilan Province, Iran. At the 2006 census, its population was 106, in 33 families. In 2016, its population was 87 in 34 households.
