= Yasan =

Yasan يسن
- Village
- Location within Iran
- Coordinates: 36°48′22″N 50°03′26″E
- Country: Iran
- Province: Gilan
- County: Siahkal
- Bakhsh: Deylaman
- Rural District: Pir Kuh

Population (2016)
  - Total: 45
- Time zone: UTC+3:30 (IRST)

Yasan (Persian: يسن) is a village in Pir Kuh Rural District, Deylaman District, Siahkal County, Gilan Province, Iran. At the 2006 census, its population was 44, in 14 families. Up to 45 people in 20 households in 2016.
