= Boneh-ye Zamin, Gilan =

Village in Gilan province, Iran

Boneh-ye Zamin Persian: بنه زمين
- Village
- Location within Iran
- Coordinates: 36°49′48″N 50°01′19″E
- Country: Iran
- Province: Gilan
- County: Siahkal
- District: Deylaman
- Rural District: Pir Kuh

Population (2016)
  - Total: 391
- Time zone: UTC+3:30 (IRST)

Boneh-ye Zamin (Persian: بنه زمين) (Note: Also romanized as Boneh Zamīn and Boneh-ye Zamīn) is a village in Pir Kuh Rural District of Deylaman District in Siahkal County, Gilan province, Iran.

== Demographics ==
=== Population ===
At the time of the 2006 National Census, the village's population was 406 in 93 households. The following census in 2011 counted 356 people in 95 households. The 2016 census measured the population of the village as 391 people in 130 households.
