= Ishku-ye Pain =

Ishku-ye Pain ايشكوپائين
- Village
- Location within Iran
- Coordinates: 36°52′00″N 49°53′00″E
- Country: Iran
- Province: Gilan
- County: Siahkal
- Bakhsh: Deylaman
- Rural District: Deylaman

Population (2006)
  - Total: 43
- Time zone: UTC+3:30 (IRST)

Ishku-ye Pain (Persian: ايشكوپائين, also Romanized as Īshkūh-e Pā’īn; also known as Pā’īn Īshkūh) is a village in Deylaman Rural District, Deylaman District, Siahkal County, Gilan Province, Iran. At the 2016 census, its population was 31, in 15 families. Down from 43 in 2006.

It is located east of Ishku-ye Bala village.
