= Pash-e Sofla =

Pash-e Sofla پش سفلی
- Village
- Location within Iran
- Coordinates: 36°54′17″N 49°52′59″E
- Country: Iran
- Province: Gilan
- County: Siahkal
- Bakhsh: Deylaman
- Rural District: Deylaman

Population (2006)
  - Total: 74
- Time zone: UTC+3:30 (IRST)

Pash-e Sofla (Persian: پش سفلی, also Romanized as Pash-e Soflá; also known as Pā’īn Pash) is a village in Deylaman Rural District, Deylaman District, Siahkal County, Gilan Province, Iran. At the 2016 census, its population was 25, in 10 families. Decreased from 74 people in 2006.
