= Kalak, Gilan =

Village in Gilan province, Iran

Kalak Persian: کلاک
- Village
- Location within Iran
- Coordinates: 36°49′41″N 49°59′34″E
- Country: Iran
- Province: Gilan
- County: Siahkal
- District: Deylaman
- Rural District: Pir Kuh

Population (2016)
  - Total: 261
- Time zone: UTC+3:30 (IRST)

Kalak (Persian: کلاک) (Note: Also romanized as Kalāk) is a village in Pir Kuh Rural District of Deylaman District in Siahkal County, Gilan province, Iran.

== Demographics ==
=== Population ===
At the time of the 2006 National Census, the village's population was 351 in 79 households. The following census in 2011 counted 283 people in 85 households. The 2016 census measured the population of the village as 261 people in 92 households.
