= Zenash Darreh =

Zenash Darreh زنش دره
- Village
- Interactive map of Zenash Darreh
- Coordinates: 36°46′54.955″N 50°7′53.792″E
- Country: Iran
- Province: Gilan
- County: Siahkal
- Bakhsh: Deylaman
- Rural District: Pir Kuh

Population (2006)
  - Total: 25
- Time zone: UTC+3:30 (IRST)

Zenash Darreh (Persian: زنش دره) is a village in Pir Kuh Rural District, Deylaman District, Siahkal County, Gilan Province, Iran. At the 2006 census, its population was 12, in 4 families. Decreased from 25 people in 2006.
