= Chamchal =

Village in Gilan province, Iran

Chamchal Persian: چمچال
- Village
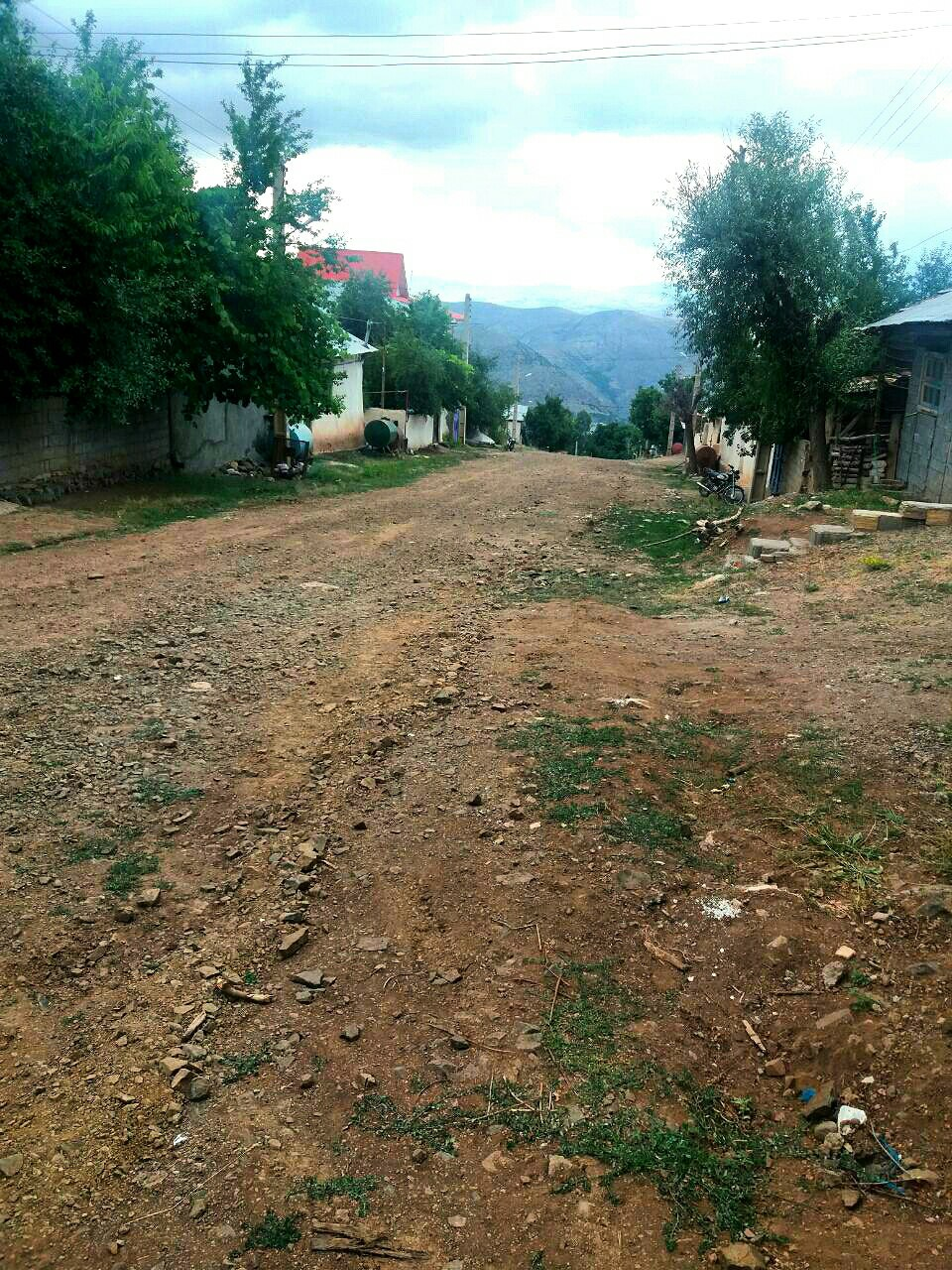
- Road through the village of Chamchal

- Location within Iran
- Coordinates: 36°48′35″N 50°01′22″E
- Country: Iran
- Province: Gilan
- County: Siahkal
- District: Deylaman
- Rural District: Pir Kuh

Population (2016)
  - Total: 166
- Time zone: UTC+3:30 (IRST)

Chamchal (Persian: چمچال) (Note: Also romanized as Chamchāl) is a village in Pir Kuh Rural District of Deylaman District in Siahkal County, Gilan province, Iran.

== Demographics ==
=== Population ===
At the time of the 2006 National Census, the village's population was 196 in 44 households. The following census in 2011 counted 172 people in 49 households. The 2016 census measured the population of the village as 166 people in 53 households.

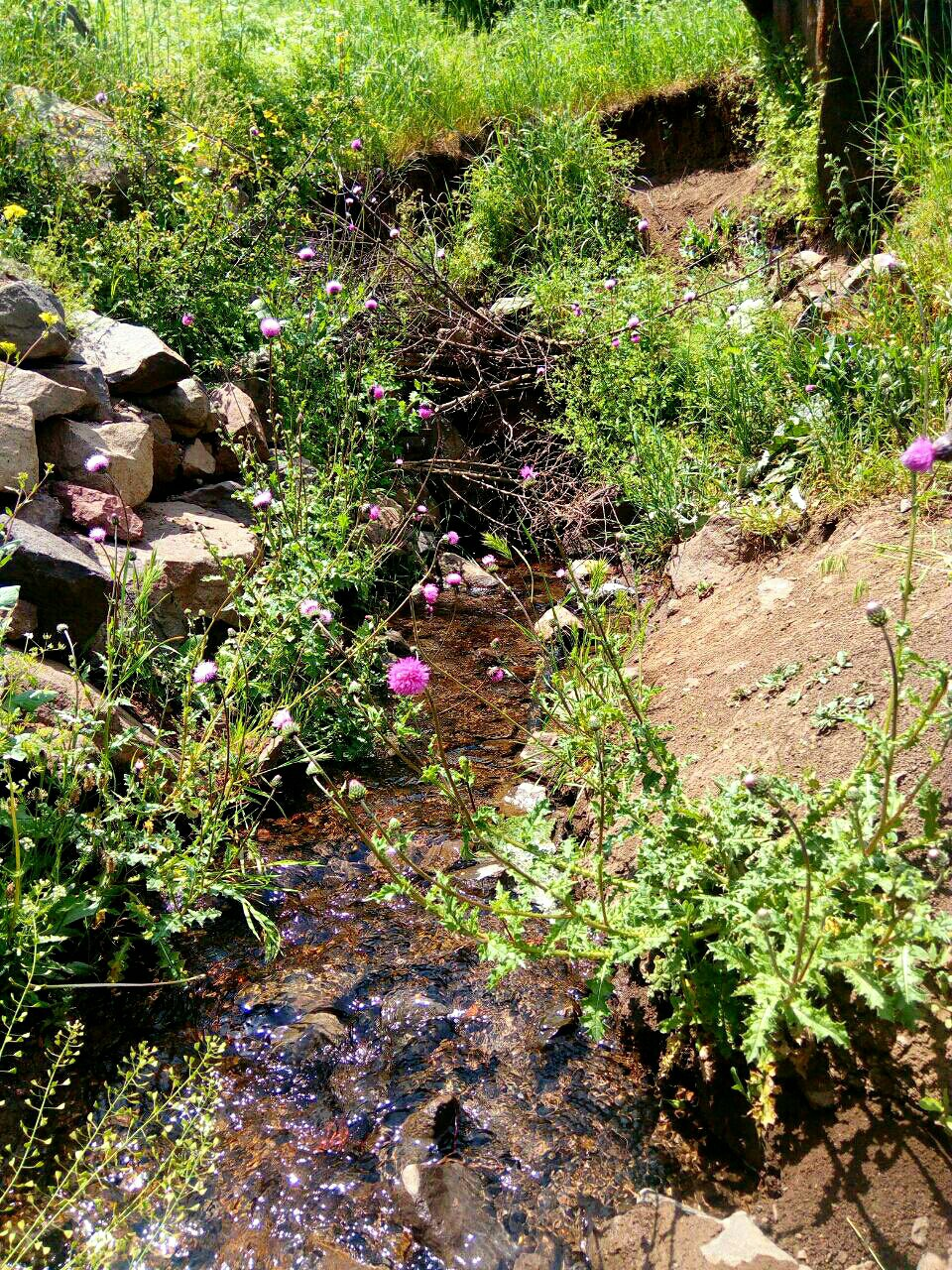
Main spring of Chamchal
