= Luai =

Luai may refer to:

- Luai, Iran, a village
- Luay, a given name
- Jarome Luai, rugby league player
