= Pash, Iran =

Pash (Persian: پش) may refer to:

- Pash-e Olya
- Pash-e Sofla
