= Arushki =

Village in Gilan province, Iran

Arushki Persian: اروشکی
- Village
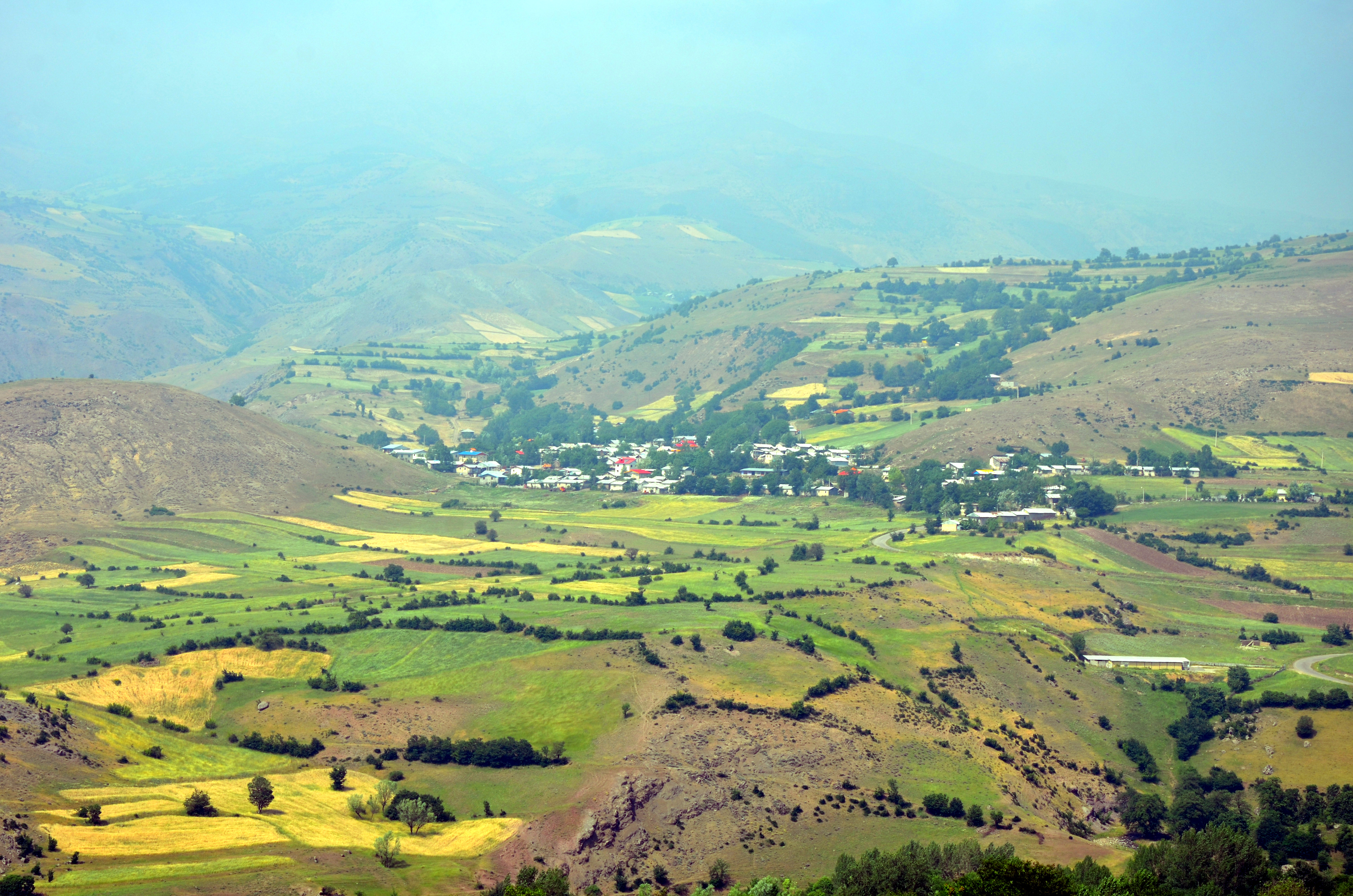
- The village of Arushki

- Location within Iran
- Coordinates: 36°52′48″N 49°52′24″E
- Country: Iran
- Province: Gilan
- County: Siahkal
- District: Deylaman
- Rural District: Deylaman

Population (2016)
  - Total: 199
- Time zone: UTC+3:30 (IRST)

Arushki (Persian: اروشکی) (Note: Also romanized as Arūshkī; also known as Arashkī, Arshaki, Arūshkī-ye Pā’īn, and Redashkī) is a village in Deylaman Rural District of Deylaman District in Siahkal County, Gilan province, Iran.

== Demographics ==
=== Population ===
At the time of the 2006 National Census, the village's population was 233 in 73 households. The following census in 2011 counted 212 people in 74 households. The 2016 census measured the population of the village as 199 people in 76 households.
