= Raz Darrud =

Village in Gilan province, Iran

Raz Darrud Persian: رزدرود
- Village
- Location within Iran
- Country: Iran
- Province: Gilan
- County: Siahkal
- District: Deylaman
- Rural District: Deylaman

Population (2016)
  - Total: 101
- Time zone: UTC+3:30 (IRST)

Raz Darrud (Persian: رزدرود) (Note: Also romanized as Raz Darrūd) is a village in Deylaman Rural District of Deylaman District in Siahkal County, Gilan province, Iran.

== Demographics ==
=== Population ===
At the time of the 2006 National Census, the village's population was 144 in 35 households. The following census in 2011 counted 101 people in 29 households. The 2016 census measured the population of the village as 101 people in 39 households.
