= Ishku-ye Bala =

Ishku-ye Bala ايشكوبالا
- Village
- Location within Iran
- Coordinates: 36°51′39″N 49°53′37″E
- Country: Iran
- Province: Gilan
- County: Siahkal
- Bakhsh: Deylaman
- Rural District: Deylaman

Population (2016)
  - Total: 87
- Time zone: UTC+3:30 (IRST)

Ishku-ye Bala (Persian: ايشكوبالا, also Romanized as Īshku-ye Bālā; also known as Ayshakhku, Bālā Īshkūh, Īshekūh, Īshkuh-e Bālā, and Īshkūh) is a village in Deylaman Rural District, Deylaman District, Siahkal County, Gilan Province, Iran. At the 2016 census, its population was 87, in 34 families. Up from 69 in 2006.

It is located west of Ishku-ye Pain village.
