= Diar Jan =

Village in Gilan province, Iran

Diar Jan Persian: ديارجان
- Village
- Location within Iran
- Coordinates: 36°52′55″N 50°00′17″E
- Country: Iran
- Province: Gilan
- County: Siahkal
- District: Deylaman
- Rural District: Deylaman

Population (2016)
  - Total: 122
- Time zone: UTC+3:30 (IRST)

Diar Jan (Persian: ديارجان) (Note: Also romanized as Dīār Jān) is a village in Deylaman Rural District of Deylaman District in Siahkal County, Gilan province, Iran.

== Demographics ==
=== Population ===
At the time of the 2006 National Census, the village's population was 138 in 44 households. The following census in 2011 counted 119 people in 50 households. The 2016 census measured the population of the village as 122 people in 48 households.
