= Molla Mahalleh, Siahkal =

Village in Gilan province, Iran

Molla Mahalleh Persian: ملا محله
- Village
- Location within Iran
- Coordinates: 36°48′52″N 50°01′01″E
- Country: Iran
- Province: Gilan
- County: Siahkal
- District: Deylaman
- Rural District: Pir Kuh

Population (2016)
  - Total: 155
- Time zone: UTC+3:30 (IRST)

Molla Mahalleh (Persian: ملامحله) (Note: Also romanized as Mollā Maḩalleh; also known as Mollā Maḩalleh-ye Pā’īn) is a village in Pir Kuh Rural District of Deylaman District in Siahkal County, Gilan province, Iran.

== Demographics ==
=== Population ===
At the time of the 2006 National Census, the village's population was 197 in 60 households. The following census in 2011 counted 163 people in 63 households. The 2016 census measured the population of the village as 155 people in 58 households.
