= Asiabar =

Village in Gilan province, Iran

Asiabar Persian: آسيابر
- Village
- Location within Iran
- Coordinates: 36°51′51″N 49°50′26″E
- Country: Iran
- Province: Gilan
- County: Siahkal
- District: Deylaman
- Rural District: Deylaman

Population (2016)
  - Total: 384
- Time zone: UTC+3:30 (IRST)

Asiabar (Aciabar) (Persian: آسيابر) (Note: Also romanized as Āsīābar and Āsīyābar) is a village in Deylaman Rural District of Deylaman District in Siahkal County, Gilan province, Iran.

== Demographics ==
=== Population ===
At the time of the 2006 National Census, the village's population was 479 in 169 households. The following census in 2011 counted 465 people in 182 households. The 2016 census measured the population of the village as 384 people in 148 households.
