= Nowruz Mahalleh =

Village in Gilan province, Iran

Nowruz Mahalleh Persian: نوروزمحله
- Village
- Location within Iran
- Coordinates: 36°54′27″N 49°55′42″E
- Country: Iran
- Province: Gilan
- County: Siahkal
- District: Deylaman
- Rural District: Deylaman

Population (2016)
  - Total: 191
- Time zone: UTC+3:30 (IRST)

Nowruz Mahalleh (Persian: نوروزمحله) (Note: Also romanized as Nauroz Mahalleh, Now Rūz Maḩalleh, and Nowrūz Maḩalleh; also known as Norug-Makhala and Nowrūzī Maḩalleh) is a village in Deylaman Rural District of Deylaman District in Siahkal County, Gilan province, Iran.

== Demographics ==
=== Population ===
At the time of the 2006 National Census, the village's population was 224 in 57 households. The following census in 2011 counted 200 people in 61 households. The 2016 census measured the population of the village as 191 people in 64 households.

== Archeological Sites ==
Near Nowruz Mahalleh is the site of Lasulkan, an Iron Age cemetery.
