= Jaliseh =

Village in Gilan province, Iran

Jaliseh Persian: جليسه
- Village
- Location within Iran
- Coordinates: 36°47′29″N 50°01′28″E
- Country: Iran
- Province: Gilan
- County: Siahkal
- District: Deylaman
- Rural District: Pir Kuh

Population (2016)
  - Total: 516
- Time zone: UTC+3:30 (IRST)

Jaliseh (Persian: جليسه) (Note: Also romanized as Jalīseh; also known as Jalīseh-ye Pā’īn) is a village in Pir Kuh Rural District of Deylaman District in Siahkal County, Gilan province, Iran.

Jaliseh's geographical location is mountainous and its climate is cold. The village's water comes from a local spring and river, and its products are grains, plantains, walnuts, wool, dairy products, and honey. The residents' occupations are agriculture and livestock.

== Demographics ==
=== Language ===
Jaliseh is a Kurdish speaking village.

=== Population ===
At the time of the 2006 National Census, the village's population was 659 in 171 households. The following census in 2011 counted 628 people in 183 households. The 2016 census measured the population of the village as 516 people in 165 households.
