= Eyn-e Sheykh =

Village in Gilan province, Iran

Eyn-e Sheykh Persian: عين شيخ
- Village
- Location within Iran
- Coordinates: 36°49′52″N 49°56′22″E
- Country: Iran
- Province: Gilan
- County: Siahkal
- District: Deylaman
- Rural District: Deylaman

Population (2016)
  - Total: 277
- Time zone: UTC+3:30 (IRST)

Eyn-e Sheykh (Persian: عين شيخ) (Note: Also romanized as ‘Eyn Sheykh and ‘Eyn-e Sheykh; also known as Ainashaikh and Aynasheykh) is a village in Deylaman Rural District of Deylaman District in Siahkal County, Gilan province, Iran.

== Demographics ==
=== Population ===
At the time of the 2006 National Census, the village's population was 315 in 103 households. The following census in 2011 counted 267 people in 101 households. The 2016 census measured the population of the village as 277 people in 114 households.
