= Haft Band =

Haft Band هفت بند
- Village
- Location within Iran
- Coordinates: 36°45′29″N 50°05′52″E
- Country: Iran
- Province: Gilan
- County: Siahkal
- Bakhsh: Deylaman
- Rural District: Pir Kuh

Population (2016)
  - Total: 45
- Time zone: UTC+3:30 (IRST)

Haft Band (Persian: هفت بند) is a village in Pir Kuh Rural District, Deylaman District, Siahkal County, Gilan Province, Iran. At the 2016 census, its population was 45, in 13 families. Down from 66 in 2006.
