= Pirakuh =

Pirakuh (Persian: پيركوه or پيراكوه) may refer to:

- Pirakuh Rural District (پيراكوه - Pīrākūh)
- Pirakuh, Gilan (پيركوه - Pīrakūh)
