= Qeshlaq, Gilan =

Village in Gilan province, Iran

Qeshlaq Persian: قشلاق
- Village
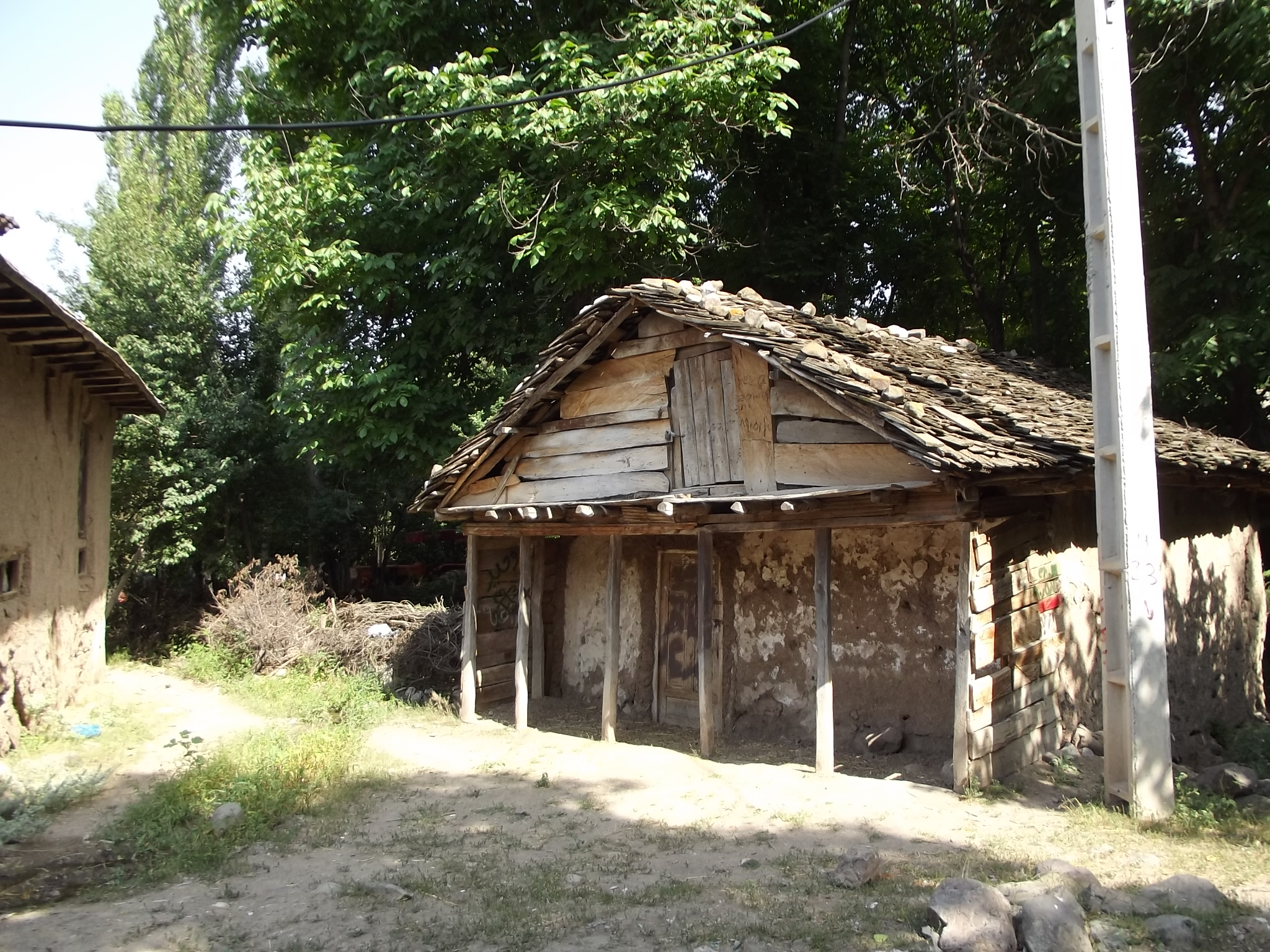
- Abandoned shop in the village of Qeshlaq

- Location within Iran
- Coordinates: 36°51′37″N 49°52′04″E
- Country: Iran
- Province: Gilan
- County: Siahkal
- District: Deylaman
- Rural District: Deylaman

Population (2016)
  - Total: 176
- Time zone: UTC+3:30 (IRST)

Qeshlaq (Persian: قشلاق) (Note: Also romanized as Qeshlāq; also known as Kishlak) is a village in Deylaman Rural District of Deylaman District in Siahkal County, Gilan province, Iran.

== Demographics ==
=== Population ===
At the time of the 2006 National Census, the village's population was 218 in 72 households. The following census in 2011 counted 186 people in 69 households. The 2016 census measured the population of the village as 176 people in 71 households.
