= Molumeh =

Village in Gilan province, Iran

Molumeh Persian: ملومه
- Village
- Location within Iran
- Coordinates: 36°51′06″N 49°55′40″E
- Country: Iran
- Province: Gilan
- County: Siahkal
- District: Deylaman
- Rural District: Deylaman

Population (2016)
  - Total: 316
- Time zone: UTC+3:30 (IRST)

Molumeh (Persian: ملومه) (Note: Also romanized as Malūmeh and Molūmeh; also known as Mūlameh) is a village in Deylaman Rural District of Deylaman District in Siahkal County, Gilan province, Iran.

== Demographics ==
=== Population ===
At the time of the 2006 National Census, the village's population was 266 in 95 households. The following census in 2011 counted 246 people in 97 households. The 2016 census measured the population of the village as 316 people in 126 households.
