= Zenash =

Zenash زنش
- Village
- Location within Iran
- Coordinates: 36°47′08″N 50°06′53″E
- Country: Iran
- Province: Gilan
- County: Siahkal
- Bakhsh: Deylaman
- Rural District: Pir Kuh

Population (2016)
  - Total: 41
- Time zone: UTC+3:30 (IRST)

Zenash (Persian: زنش) is a village in Pir Kuh Rural District, Deylaman District, Siahkal County, Gilan Province, Iran. At the 2006 census, its population was 89, in 26 families. Decreased to 41 people and 14 households in 2016.
