= Lur, Iran =

Lur (Persian: لور), in Iran, may refer to:

- Lur, Gilan
- Lur, Hormozgan
- Lur, West Azerbaijan
- The Lur people of Western Iran
