= Gulak, Gilan =

Village in Gilan province, Iran

Gulak Persian: گولک
- Village
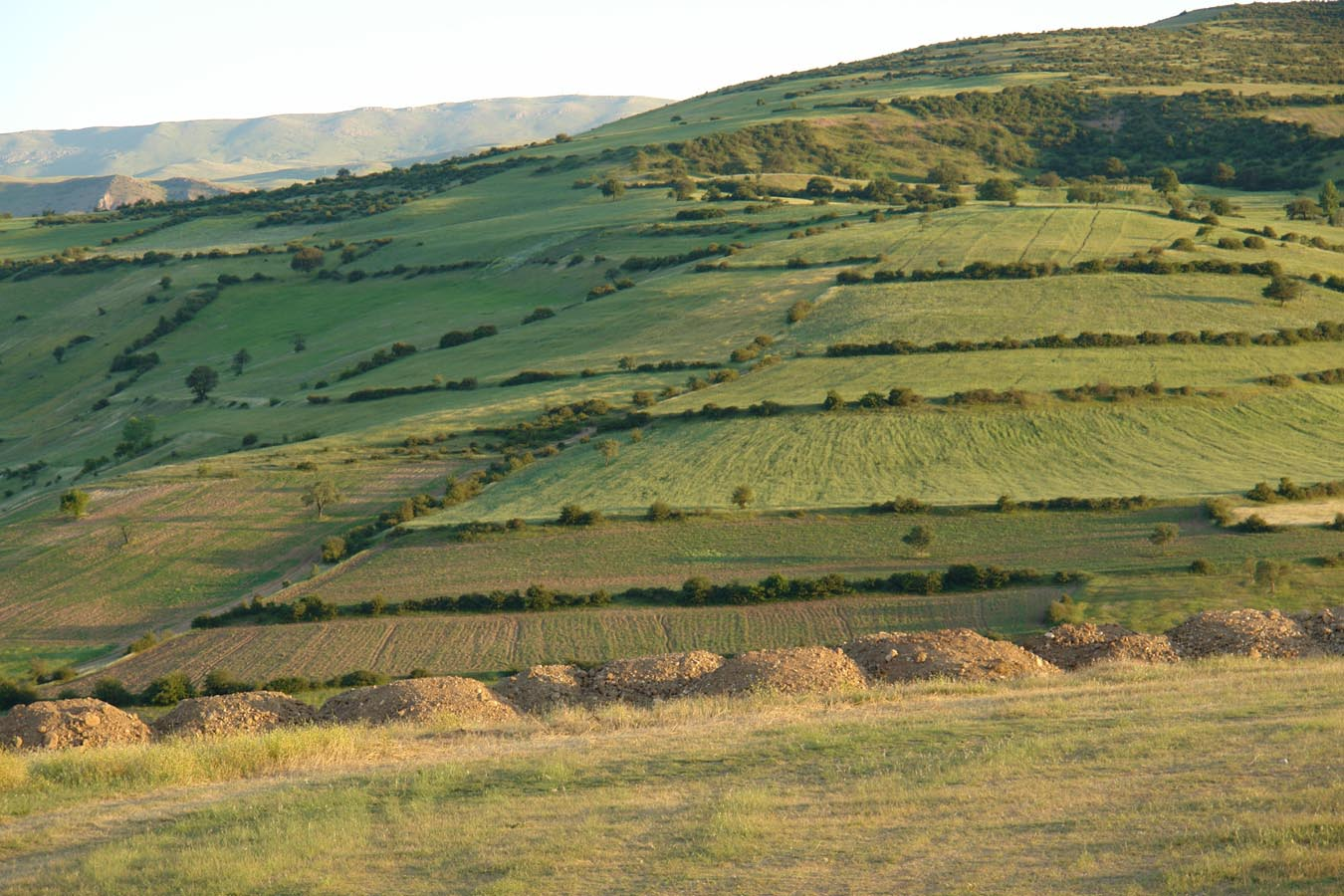
- Spring landscape near the village of Gulak

- Location within Iran
- Coordinates: 36°51′52″N 50°00′24″E
- Country: Iran
- Province: Gilan
- County: Siahkal
- District: Deylaman
- Rural District: Deylaman

Population (2016)
  - Total: 398
- Time zone: UTC+3:30 (IRST)

Gulak (Persian: گولک) (Note: Also romanized as Gūlak; also known as Golak) is a village in Deylaman Rural District of Deylaman District in Siahkal County, Gilan province, Iran.

== Demographics ==
Gulak Population history
Year	Pop.	±%
1966	371	—
1976	442	+19.1%
1986	666	+50.7%
2006	466	−30.0%
2011	442	−5.2%
2016	398	−10.0%

=== Population ===
At the time of the 1966 census, Gulak was in Siahkal district of Lahijan County, with a population of 371 people in 73 households. The village had school and mosque, and its agricultural products have been wheat and barley.

The 1976 census measured a population of 442 people in 89 households. In 1986, Gulak's population reached 666 people in 133 households. The village had gained electricity and Tap water house by that time.

The rural District was transferred to Deylaman District of Siahkal County in 1997.

At the time of the 2006 National Census, the village's population was 466 in 129 households. The following census in 2011 counted 442 people in 159 households. The 2016 census measured the population of the village as 398 people in 148 households.
