= Asiab Sar, Siahkal =

Asiab Sar آسیاب سر
- Village
- Location within Iran
- Coordinates: 36°44′42″N 50°04′45″E
- Country: Iran
- Province: Gilan
- County: Siahkal
- Bakhsh: Deylaman
- Rural District: Pir Kuh

Population (2016)
  - Total: 76
- Time zone: UTC+3:30 (IRST)

Asiab Sar (Persian: آسیاب سر, also Romanized as Āsīāb Sar) is a village in Pir Kuh Rural District, Deylaman District, Siahkal County, Gilan Province, Iran. At the 2016 census, its population was 76, in 29 families. Down from 103 people in 2006.
