= Pash-e Olya =

Pash-e Olya پش عليا
- Village
- Location within Iran
- Coordinates: 36°54′28″N 49°52′18″E
- Country: Iran
- Province: Gilan
- County: Siahkal
- Bakhsh: Deylaman
- Rural District: Deylaman

Population (2006)
  - Total: 54
- Time zone: UTC+3:30 (IRST)

Pash-e Olya (Persian: پش عليا, also Romanized as Pash-e ‘Olyā; also known as Bālā Pash and Pash) is a village in Deylaman Rural District, Deylaman District, Siahkal County, Gilan Province, Iran. At the 2016 census, its population was 44, in 18 families. Down from 54 in 2006.
