= Pey Navand =

Village in Gilan province, Iran

Pey Navand Persian: پينوند
- Village
- Location within Iran
- Coordinates: 36°47′45″N 50°08′49″E
- Country: Iran
- Province: Gilan
- County: Siahkal
- District: Deylaman
- Rural District: Pir Kuh

Population (2016)
  - Total: 120
- Time zone: UTC+3:30 (IRST)

Pey Navand (Persian: پينوند) is a village in Pir Kuh Rural District of Deylaman District in Siahkal County, Gilan province, Iran.

== Demographics ==
=== Population ===
At the time of the 2006 National Census, the village's population was 132 in 48 households. The following census in 2011 counted 139 people in 58 households. The 2016 census measured the population of the village as 120 people in 49 households.
