= Jaran =

Jaran جاران
- Village
- Location within Iran
- Coordinates: 36°46′20″N 50°04′59″E
- Country: Iran
- Province: Gilan
- County: Siahkal
- Bakhsh: Deylaman
- Rural District: Pir Kuh

Population (2016)
  - Total: 25
- Time zone: UTC+3:30 (IRST)

Jaran (Persian: جاران, also Romanized as Jārān) is a village in Pir Kuh Rural District, Deylaman District, Siahkal County, Gilan Province, Iran. At the 2006 census, its population was 29, in 8 families. In 2016 its population was 25, in 9 households.
