= Chak Rud =

Chak Rud چاكرود
- Village
- Location within Iran
- Coordinates: 36°50′07″N 50°03′19″E
- Country: Iran
- Province: Gilan
- County: Siahkal
- Bakhsh: Deylaman
- Rural District: Pir Kuh

Population (2016)
  - Total: 27
- Time zone: UTC+3:30 (IRST)

Chak Rud (Persian: چاكرود, also Romanized as Chāk Rūd) is a village in Pir Kuh Rural District, Deylaman District, Siahkal County, Gilan Province, Iran. At the 2006 census, its population was 33, in 8 families. Down to 27 people in 9 households in 2016.
