= Khormarud =

Khormarud (Persian: خرمارو) may refer to:

- Khormarud, Gilan
- Khormarud-e Jonubi Rural District, in Golestan Province
- Khormarud-e Shomali Rural District, in Golestan Province
