= Talijan Kar =

Talijan Kar تليجان كر
- Village
- Location within Iran
- Coordinates: 36°45′22″N 50°05′30″E
- Country: Iran
- Province: Gilan
- County: Siahkal
- Bakhsh: Deylaman
- Rural District: Pir Kuh

Population (2016)
  - Total: 28
- Time zone: UTC+3:30 (IRST)

Talijan Kar (Persian: تليجان كر, also Romanized as Talījān Kar) is a village in Pir Kuh Rural District, Deylaman District, Siahkal County, Gilan Province, Iran. At the 2006 census, its population was 28, in 9 families. Down from 41 people in 2006.
