= Mikal, Gilan =

Village in Gilan province, Iran

Mikal Persian: ميكال
- Village
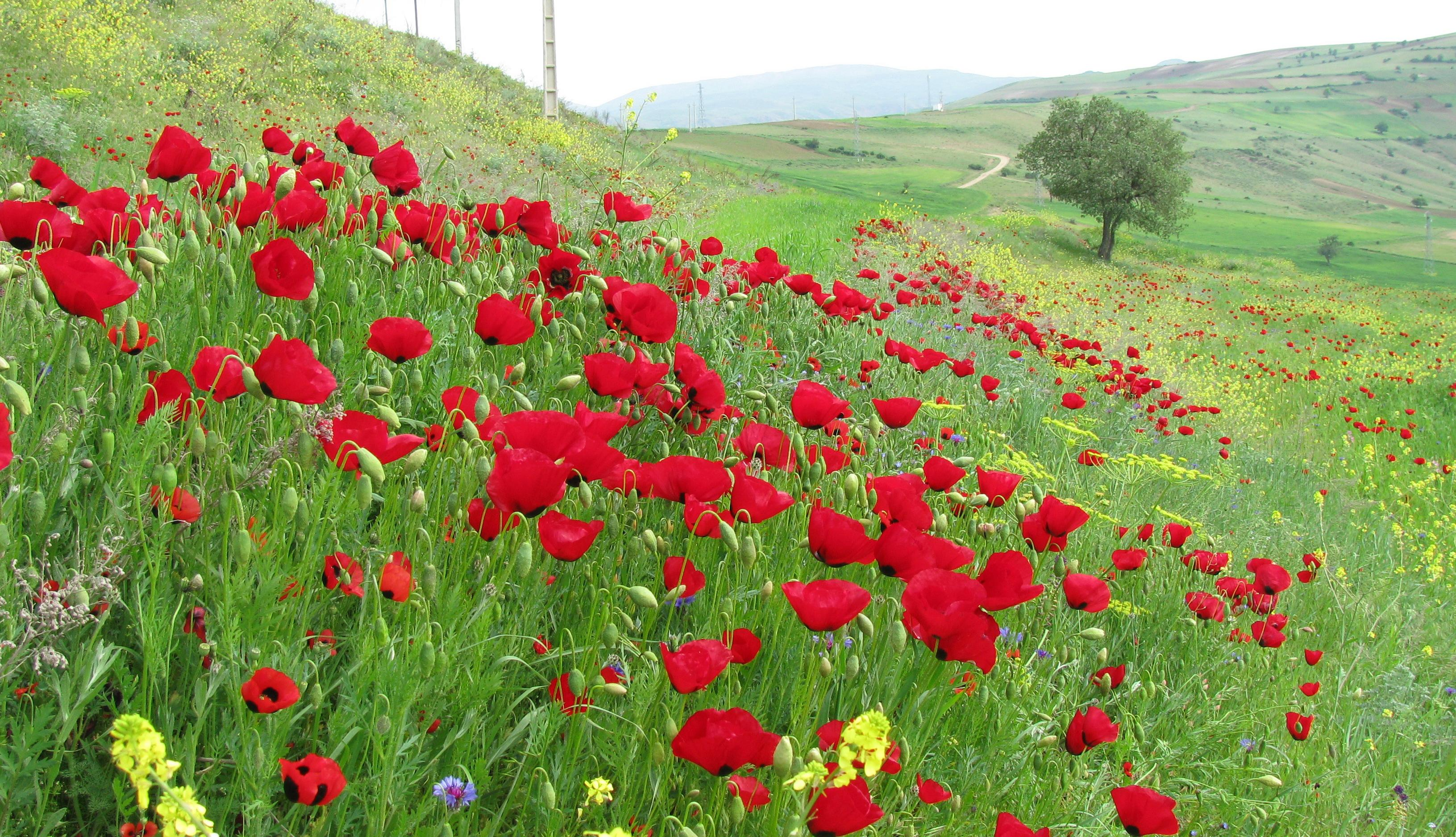
- Flowers near Mikal

- Location within Iran
- Coordinates: 36°52′08″N 49°57′58″E
- Country: Iran
- Province: Gilan
- County: Siahkal
- District: Deylaman
- Rural District: Deylaman

Population (2016)
  - Total: 400
- Time zone: UTC+3:30 (IRST)

Mikal (Persian: ميكال) (Note: Also romanized as Mīkāl) is a village in Deylaman Rural District of Deylaman District in Siahkal County, Gilan province, Iran.

== Demographics ==
=== Population ===
Mikal Population history
Year	Pop.	±%
1956	354	—
1966	483	+36.4%
1976	540	+11.8%
1986	713	+32.0%
2006	456	−36.0%
2011	390	−14.5%
2016	400	+2.6%

At the 1966 census, Mikal was in Deylaman Rural District, in Siahkal District of Lahijan County, with a population of 483 people in 91 households. It had mosque and school. Its agricultural products have been wheat, barley, lentil and bean.

The 1976 census measured a population of 540 people in 140 households. In 1986, Mikal's population reached 713 people in 136 households. The village had health house at that time.

The rural District was transferred to Deylaman District of Siahkal County in 1997.

At the time of the 2006 National Census, the village's population was 456 in 133 households. The following census in 2011 counted 390 people in 134 households. The 2016 census measured the population of the village as 400 people in 141 households.
