= Karsang-e Shahi Jan =

Karsang-e Shahi Jan كارسنگ شاهی جان
- Village
- Location within Iran
- Coordinates: 36°45′19″N 50°04′36″E
- Country: Iran
- Province: Gilan
- County: Siahkal
- Bakhsh: Deylaman
- Rural District: Pir Kuh

Population (2016)
  - Total: 55
- Time zone: UTC+3:30 (IRST)

Karsang-e Shahi Jan (Persian: كارسنگ شاهی جان, also Romanized as Kārsang-e Shāhī Jān; also known as Kārsang) is a village in Pir Kuh Rural District, Deylaman District, Siahkal County, Gilan Province, Iran. At the 2006 census, its population was 99, in 24 families. Down to 55 people and 23 households in 2006.
