= Lor =

LOR or Lor may refer to:

== Science ==
- Loricrin, a protein of the epidermis
- Loss of resistance, in epidural anesthesia
- Lunar orbit rendezvous, a method used to land man on the moon and safely return

== People ==
- Lor (surname)
- Lor, a native of Lorestan
- Lor, a speaker of Lori language
- Lor (musician), Cameroonian musician
- The Lady of Rage (born 1968), American rapper
- Lor family in the film Gran Torino, including
  - Thao Vang Lor
  - Sue Lor
- Lurs, an Iranic ethnic group

== Places ==
- Lor, Armenia, a town of Syunik province
- Lor, Aisne, a commune of the Aisne département, in northern France
- Lor, Gilan, a village in Iran
- Lor, Kermanshah, a village in Iran
- Lorton (Amtrak station), Virginia, United States
- Lindsey Oil Refinery, an oil refinery on the east coast of the United Kingdom
- Liverpool Overhead Railway, a closed Overhead railway in England
- Lucas Oil Raceway at Indianapolis

== Other ==
- Lor (cheese), a traditional Turkish whey cheese
- LOR (Line of Route), a UK numbering scheme to refer to a point on rail route similar to Engineer's Line Reference (ELR)
- Laing O'Rourke, international construction company
- LiveonRelease, an all girl punk rock band
- Learning object repository
- Letter of recommendation
- Letter of reprimand
- Lord of the Rings Adventure Game
- Legends of Runeterra, online card game abbreviated as LoR
