= Khorram Rud =

Village in Gilan province, Iran

Khorram Rud Persian: خرم رود
- Village
- Location within Iran
- Coordinates: 36°52′34″N 49°56′50″E
- Country: Iran
- Province: Gilan
- County: Siahkal
- District: Deylaman
- Rural District: Deylaman

Population (2016)
  - Total: 120
- Time zone: UTC+3:30 (IRST)

Khorram Rud (Persian: خرم رود) (Note: Also romanized as Khorram Rūd; also known as Khormārūd, Khurmahrūd, and Khurumrud) is a village in Deylaman Rural District of Deylaman District in Siahkal County, Gilan province, Iran.

== Demographics ==
=== Population ===
At the time of the 2006 National Census, the village's population was 166 in 41 households. The following census in 2011 counted 138 people in 46 households. The 2016 census measured the population of the village as 120 people in 42 households.
