= Pishkeli Jan-e Bala =

Village in Gilan province, Iran

Pishkeli Jan-e Bala Persian: پيشكليجان بالا
- Village
- Location within Iran
- Coordinates: 36°46′02″N 50°02′56″E
- Country: Iran
- Province: Gilan
- County: Siahkal
- District: Deylaman
- Rural District: Pir Kuh

Population (2016)
  - Total: 114
- Time zone: UTC+3:30 (IRST)

Pishkeli Jan-e Bala (Persian: پيشكليجان بالا) (Note: Also romanized as Pīshkelī Jān-e Bālā; also known as Peshgel Jān-e Bālā) is a village in Pir Kuh Rural District of Deylaman District in Siahkal County, Gilan province, Iran.

== Demographics ==
=== Population ===
At the time of the 2006 National Census, the village's population was 142 in 42 households. The following census in 2011 counted 117 people in 36 households. The 2016 census measured the population of the village as 114 people in 41 households.
