= Liyeh Chak, Pir Kuh =

Liyeh Chak لیه چاک
- Village
- Location within Iran
- Coordinates: 36°50′24″N 49°52′12″E
- Country: Iran
- Province: Gilan
- County: Siahkal
- Bakhsh: Deylaman
- Rural District: Pir Kuh

Population (2016)
  - Total: 33
- Time zone: UTC+3:30 (IRST)

Liyeh Chak (Persian: لیه چاک, also Romanized as Līyeh Chāk) is a village in Pir Kuh Rural District, Deylaman District, Siahkal County, Gilan Province, Iran. At the 2016 census, its population was 33, in 10 families. Down from 51 people in 2006.
