= Pir Kuh-e Sofla =

Village in Gilan province, Iran

Pir Kuh-e Sofla Persian: پيركوه سفلي
- Village
- Location within Iran
- Country: Iran
- Province: Gilan
- County: Siahkal
- District: Deylaman
- Rural District: Pir Kuh

Population (2016)
  - Total: 127
- Time zone: UTC+3:30 (IRST)

Pir Kuh-e Sofla (Persian: پیرکوه سفلی) (Note: Also romanized as Pīr Kūh-e Soflá; also known as Pīr Kūh-e Pā’īn) is a village in Pir Kuh Rural District of Deylaman District in Siahkal County, Gilan province, Iran.

== Demographics ==
=== Population ===
At the time of the 2006 National Census, the village's population was 183 in 48 households. The following census in 2011 counted 139 people in 44 households. The 2016 census measured the population of the village as 127 people in 42 households.
