= Pishkeli Jan-e Pain =

Pishkeli Jan-e Pain پيشكليجان پايين
- Village
- Location within Iran
- Coordinates: 36°46′16″N 50°03′22″E
- Country: Iran
- Province: Gilan
- County: Siahkal
- Bakhsh: Deylaman
- Rural District: Pir Kuh

Population (2016)
  - Total: 66
- Time zone: UTC+3:30 (IRST)

Pishkeli Jan-e Pain (Persian: پيشكليجان پايين, also Romanized as Pīshkelī Jān-e Pā’īn; also known as Peshgel Jān-e Pā’īn and Pīshkījān) is a village in Pir Kuh Rural District, Deylaman District, Siahkal County, Gilan Province, Iran. At the 2006 census, its population was 66, in 24 families. Decreased from 160 people in 2006.
