= Lavali =

Lavali لوالی
- Village
- Location within Iran
- Coordinates: 36°47′59″N 50°04′20″E
- Country: Iran
- Province: Gilan
- County: Siahkal
- Bakhsh: Deylaman
- Rural District: Pir Kuh

Population (2016)
  - Total: 30
- Time zone: UTC+3:30 (IRST)

Lavali (Persian: لوالی, also Romanized as Lavālī; also known as Lūā’ī) is a village in Pir Kuh Rural District, Deylaman District, Siahkal County, Gilan Province, Iran. At the 2006 census, its population was 30, in 8 families. Down from 36 in 2006.
