= Liyeh, Gilan =

Village in Gilan province, Iran

Liyeh Persian: ليه
- Village
- Location within Iran
- Coordinates: 36°53′25″N 49°57′03″E
- Country: Iran
- Province: Gilan
- County: Siahkal
- District: Deylaman
- Rural District: Deylaman

Population (2016)
  - Total: 106
- Time zone: UTC+3:30 (IRST)

Liyeh (Persian: ليه) (Note: Also romanized as Līyeh; also known as Leah and Leakh) is a village in Deylaman Rural District of Deylaman District in Siahkal County, Gilan province, Iran.

== Demographics ==
=== Population ===
At the time of the 2006 National Census, the village's population was 144 in 40 households. The following census in 2011 counted 110 people in 37 households. The 2016 census measured the population of the village as 106 people in 41 households.
