= Lur, Gilan =

Village in Gilan province, Iran

Lur Persian: لور
- Village
- Location within Iran
- Coordinates: 36°51′20″N 49°52′46″E
- Country: Iran
- Province: Gilan
- County: Siahkal
- District: Deylaman
- Rural District: Deylaman

Population (2016)
  - Total: 403
- Time zone: UTC+3:30 (IRST)

Lur (Persian: لور) (Note: Also romanized as Lūr) is a village in Deylaman Rural District of Deylaman District in Siahkal County, Gilan province, Iran.

== Demographics ==
=== Population ===
At the time of the 2006 National Census, the village's population was 546 in 166 households. The following census in 2011 counted 476 people in 161 households. The 2016 census measured the population of the village as 403 people in 165 households.
