= Lor (surname) =

Lor is a surname.

Notable people with the surname Lor include:

- Denise Lor (1929-2015), American singer and actress
- Noah Lor, American politician
- Payengxa Lor, Laotian beauty pageant competitor
- Prathna Lor, Canadian poet
- Ruth Lor Malloy (born 1932), Canadian activist and travel writer

== See also ==
- LOR
