= Pir Kuh-e Olya =

Village in Gilan province, Iran

Pir Kuh-e Olya Persian: پيركوه عليا
- Village
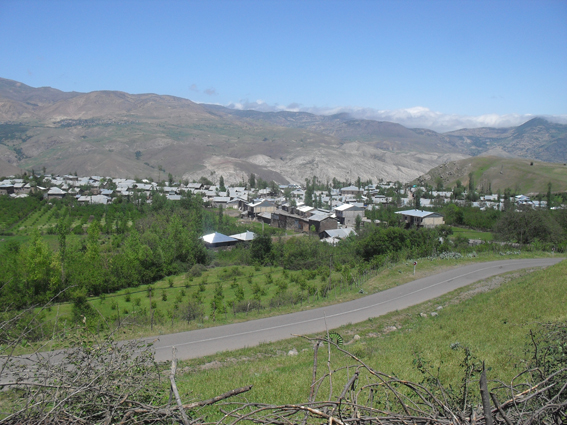
- The village of Pir Kuh-e Olya

- Location within Iran
- Coordinates: 36°49′32″N 50°00′36″E
- Country: Iran
- Province: Gilan
- County: Siahkal
- District: Deylaman
- Rural District: Pir Kuh

Population (2016)
  - Total: 588
- Time zone: UTC+3:30 (IRST)

Pir Kuh-e Olya (Persian: پيركوه عليا) (Note: Also romanized as Pīr Kūh-e ‘Olyā; also known as Bīr Kūh, Pīr Kūh, Pīr Kūt, and Pīrakuh) is a village in, and the capital of, Pir Kuh Rural District in Deylaman District of Siahkal County, Gilan province, Iran.

== Demographics ==
=== Population ===
At the time of the 2006 National Census, the village's population was 661 in 201 households. The following census in 2011 counted 541 people in 177 households. The 2016 census measured the population of the village as 588 people in 203 households. It was the most populous village in its rural district.
