= Deylaman =

City in Gilan province, Iran

Deylaman Persian: ديلمان
- City
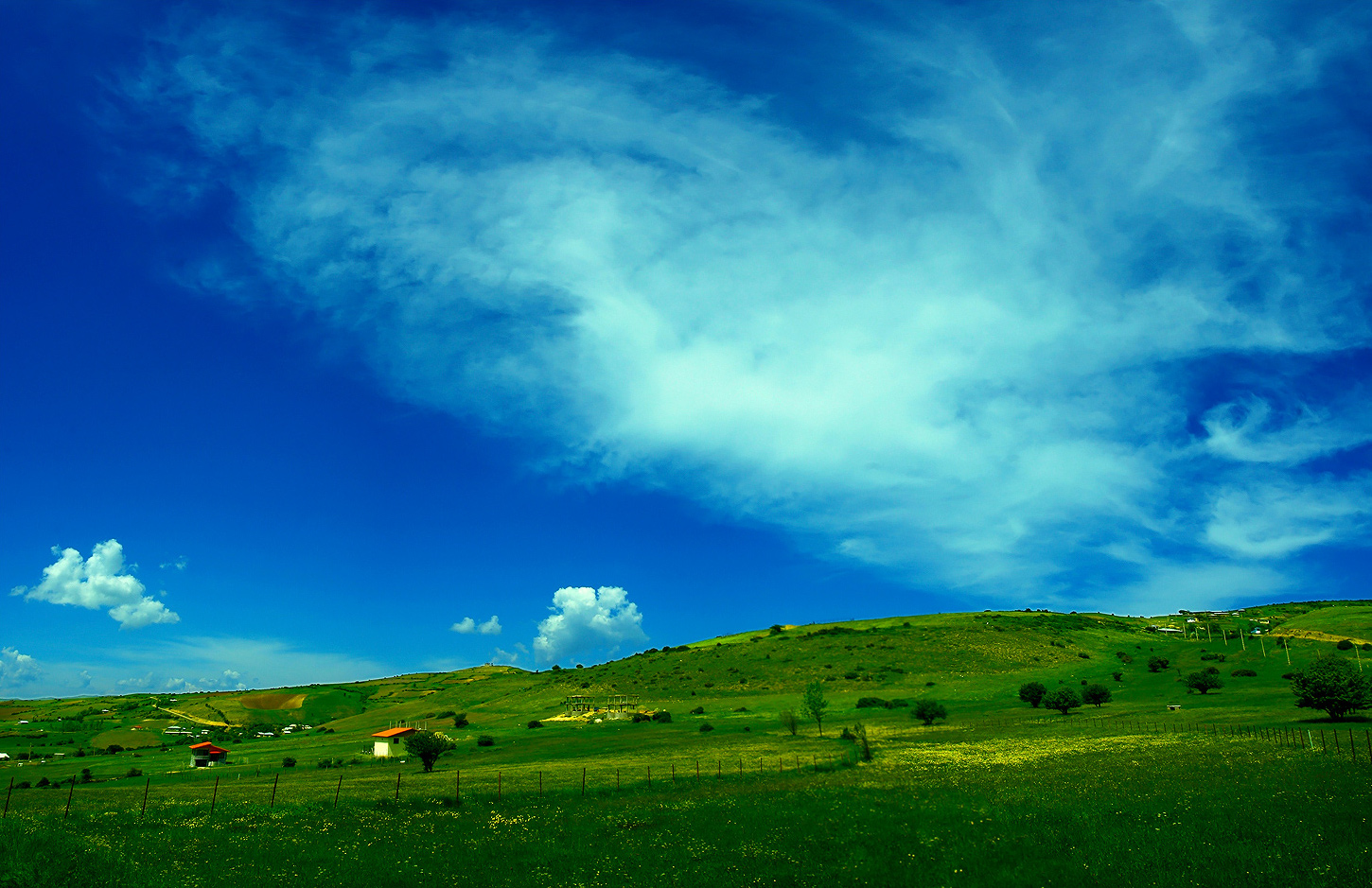

- Location within Iran
- Coordinates: 36°53′18″N 49°54′18″E
- Country: Iran
- Province: Gilan
- County: Siahkal
- District: Deylaman
- Established as a city: 1999
- Elevation: 1,400–1,600 m (4,600–5,200 ft)

Population (2016)
  - Total: 1,729
- Time zone: UTC+3:30 (IRST)

Deylaman (Persian: ديلمان) (Note: Also romanized as Deylamān and Dil’man; also known as Dailimān and Dilamon (Gilaki: ديلٚمؤن)) is a city in, and the capital of, Deylaman District in Siahkal County, Gilan province, Iran. It also serves as the administrative center for Deylaman Rural District.

== Demographics ==
=== Population ===
During the first National Census in 1956, Deylaman was a village in Lahijan County, with a population of 1,074. In 1966 its population was 974 in 188 households. Deylaman had a mosque, clinic, and school at the time of the census, but no electricity.

At the time of the 1976 census, Deylaman was in Deylaman Rural District of Siahkal District in Lahijan County. Its population was 1,001 people in 213 households. Deylaman had tap water, but still had no electricity. A middle school, veterinarian office, and police station were present in the village. In 1986, Deylaman gained a connection to the power grid, and its population rose to 1,235 people in 261 households, of whom only 120 were educated. It became the capital of the new Deylaman District in 1994 and was converted to a city in 1999.

At the time of the 2006 census, the city's population was 1,261 in 374 households. The following census in 2011 counted 1,656 people in 522 households. The 2016 census measured the population of the city as 1,729 people in 564 households.

Deylaman Population history
Year	Pop.	±%
1956	1,074	—
1966	974	−9.3%
1976	1,001	+2.8%
1986	1,235	+23.4%
2006	1,261	+2.1%
2011	1,656	+31.3%
2016	1,729	+4.4%

== Gallery ==
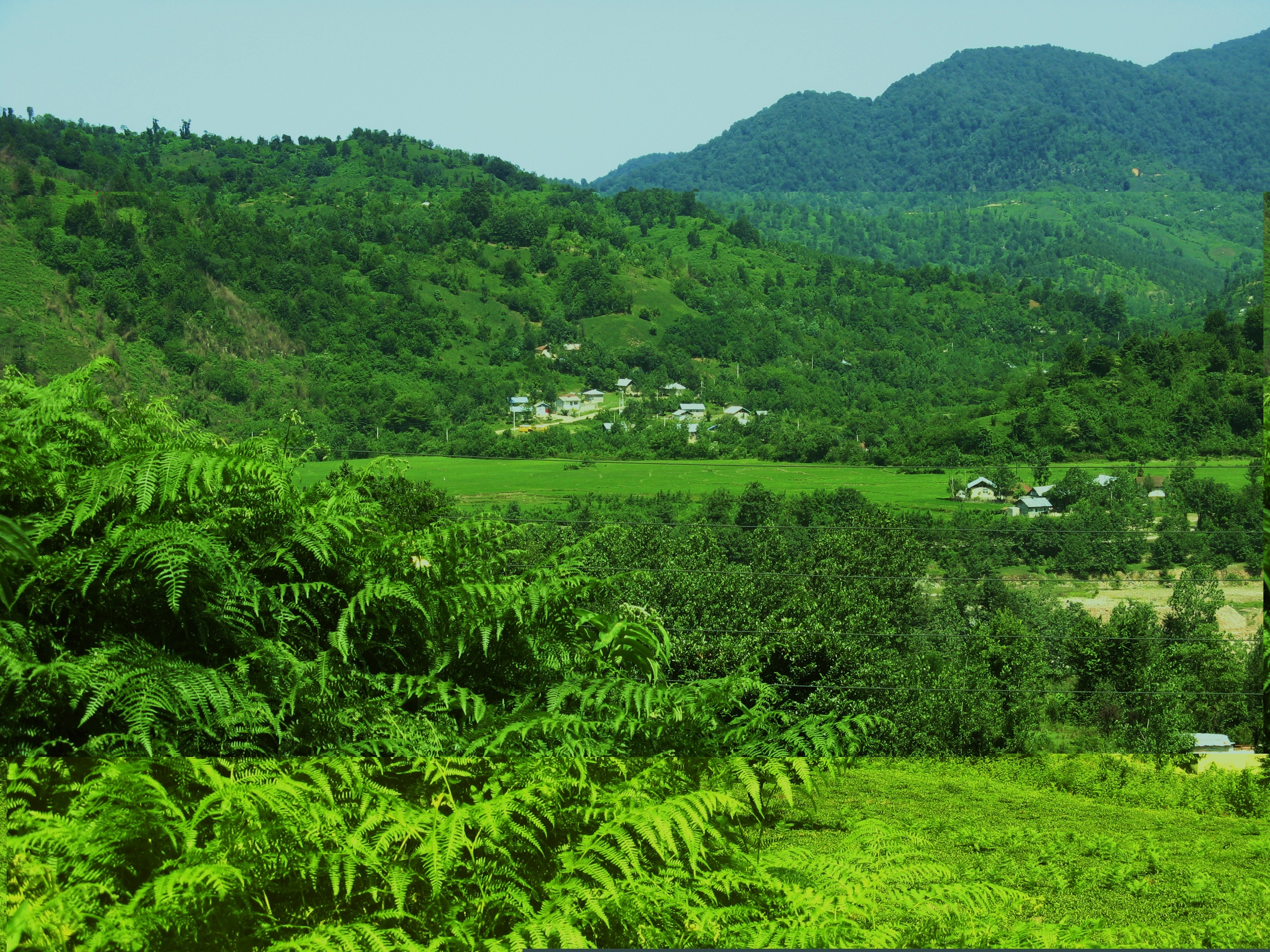

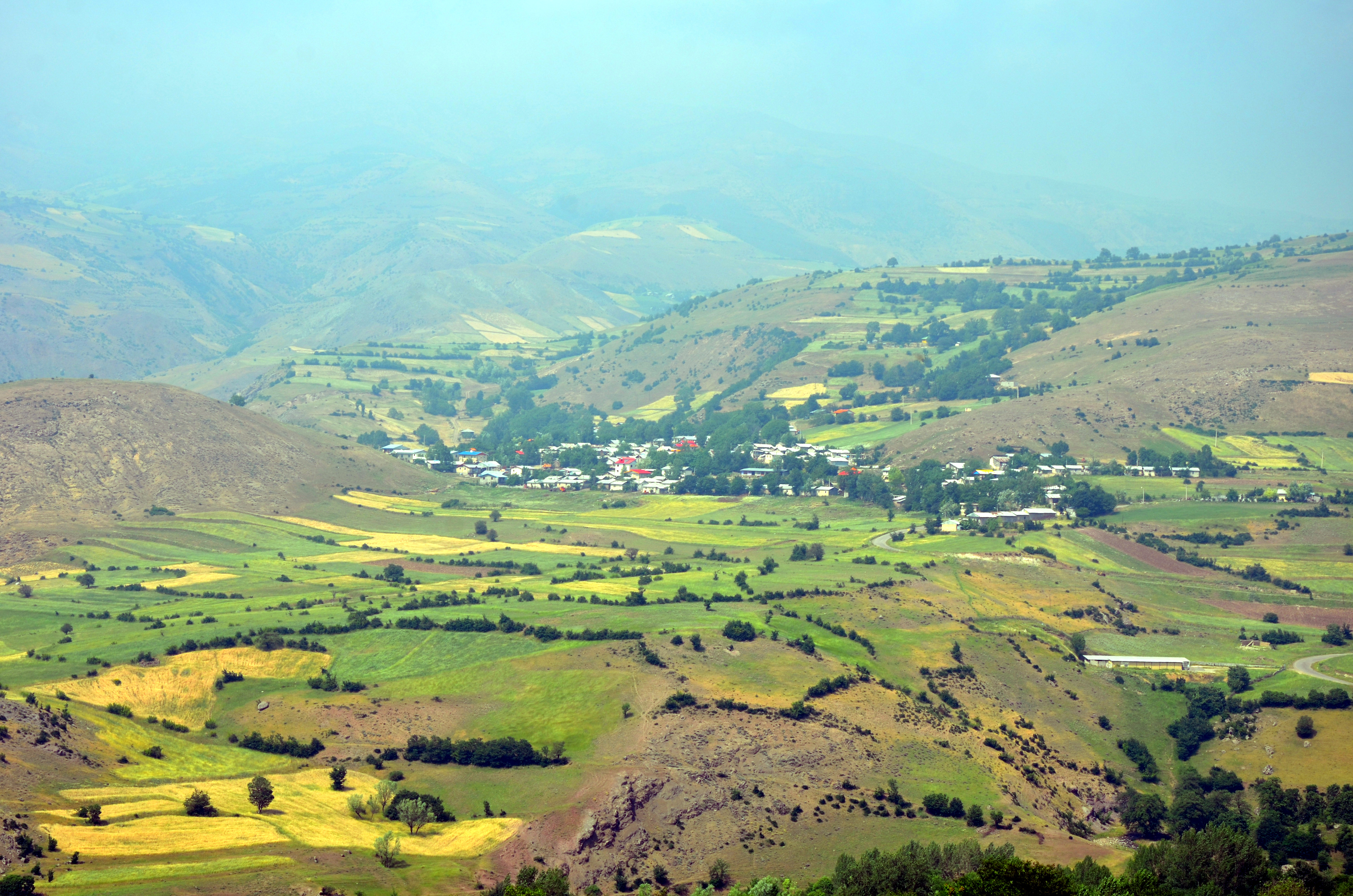

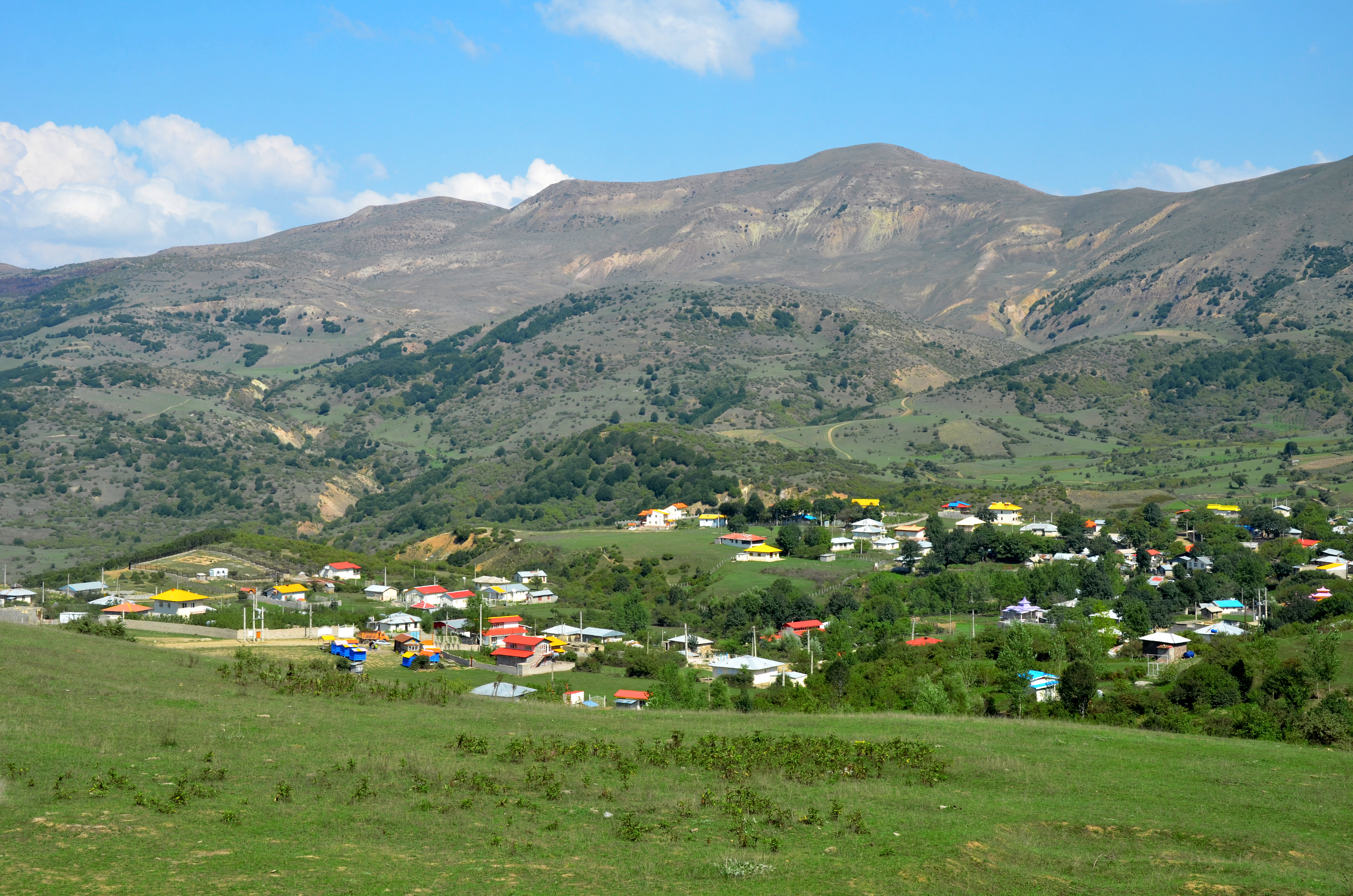

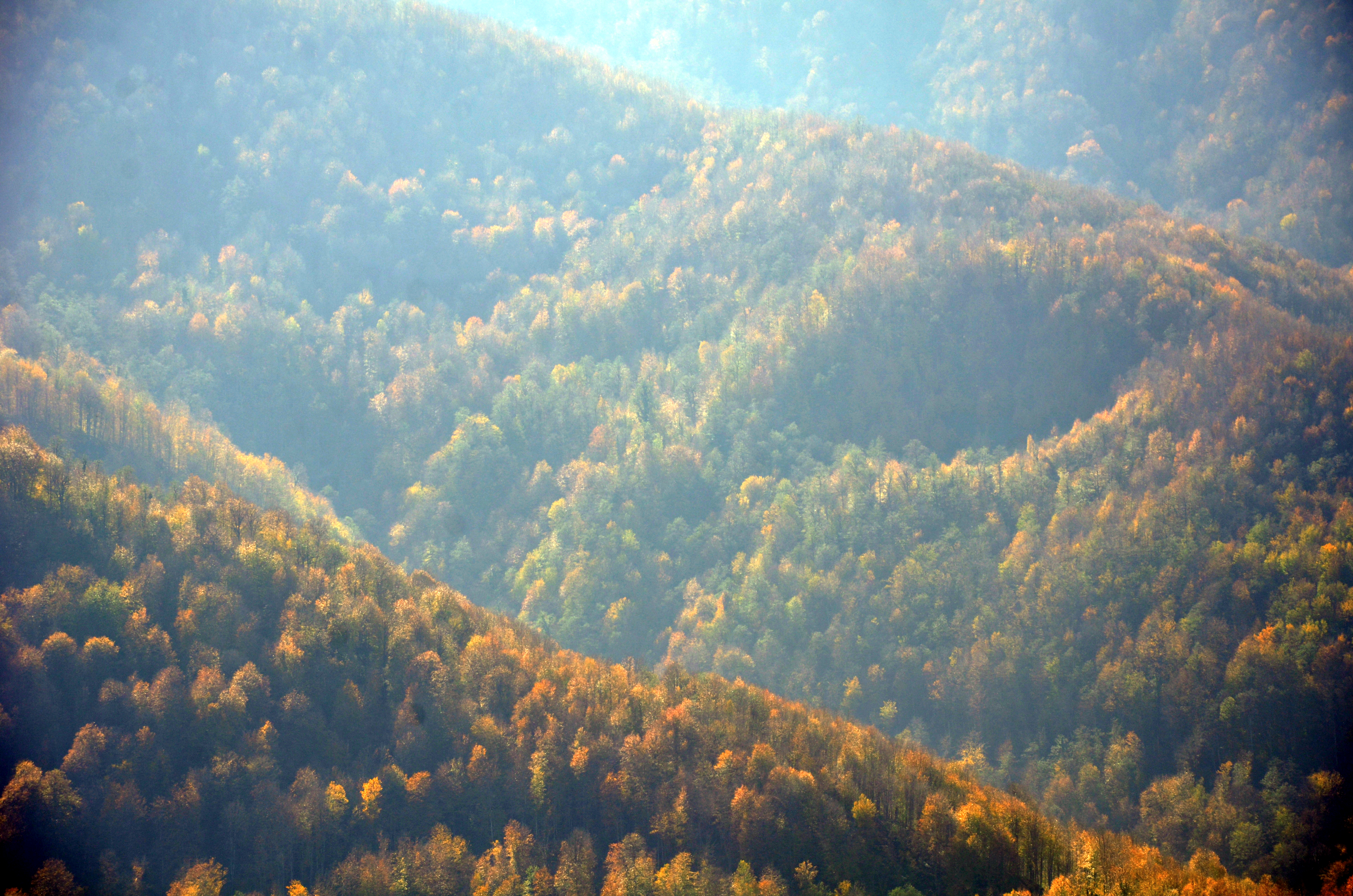

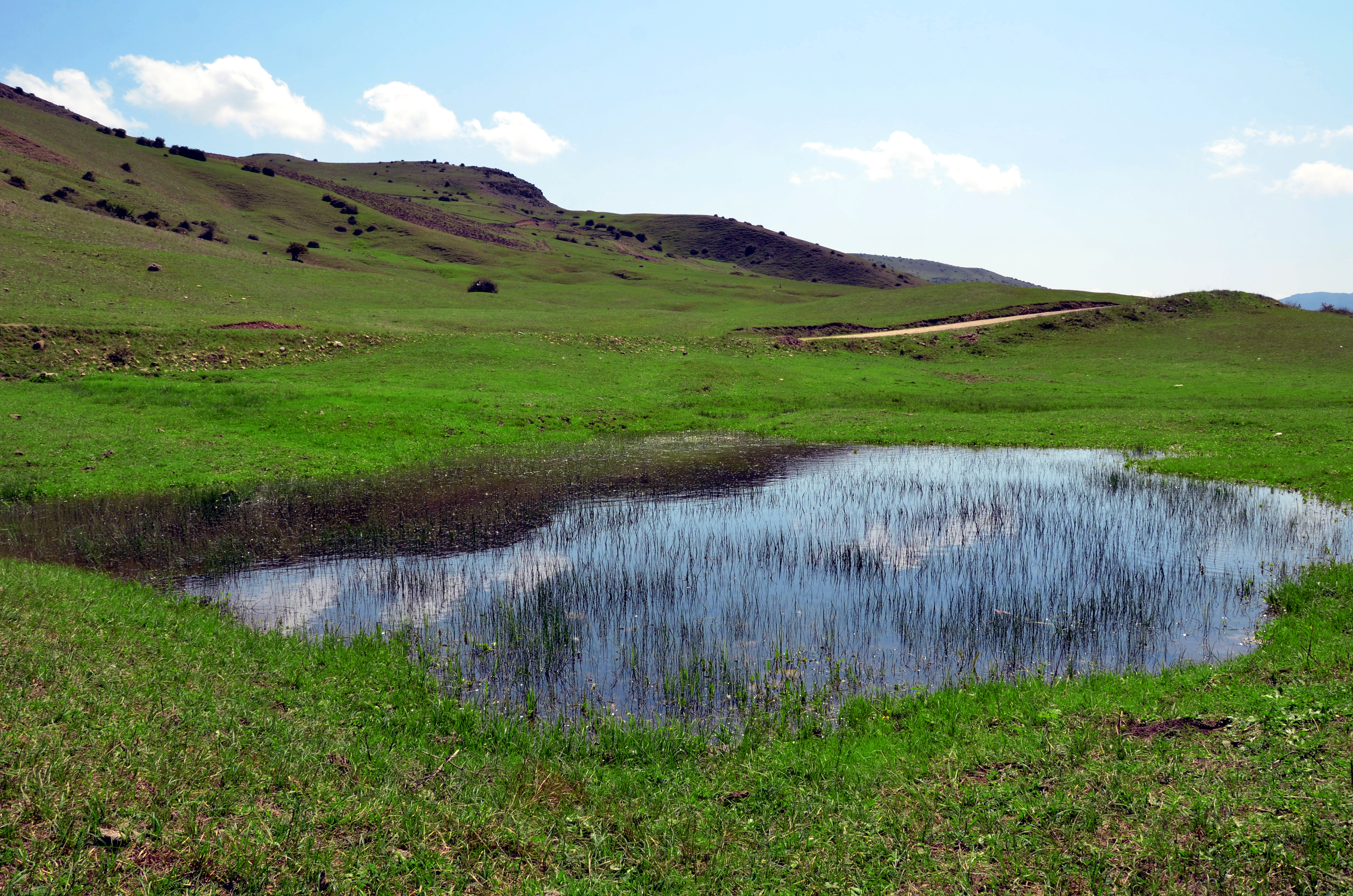

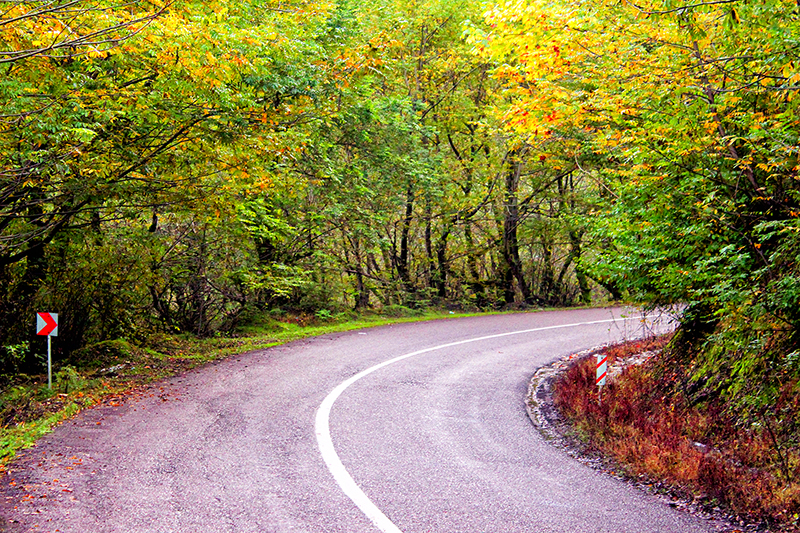
