= Pir Kuh Rural District =

Rural district in Gilan province, Iran

Pir Kuh Rural District Persian: دهستان پيركوه
- Rural District
- Location within Iran
- Coordinates: 36°46′N 50°04′E
- Country: Iran
- Province: Gilan
- County: Siahkal
- District: Deylaman
- Established: 1987
- Capital: Pir Kuh-e Olya

Population (2016)
  - Total: 3,598
- Time zone: UTC+3:30 (IRST)

Pir Kuh Rural District (Persian: دهستان پيركوه) is in Deylaman District of Siahkal County, Gilan province, Iran. Its capital is the village of Pir Kuh-e Olya.

== Demographics ==
=== Population ===
At the time of the 2006 National Census, the rural district's population was 4,633 in 1,227 households. There were 3,979 inhabitants in 1,240 households at the following census of 2011. The 2016 census measured the population of the rural district as 3,598 in 1,242 households. The most populous of its 29 villages was Pir Kuh-e Olya, with 588 people.

The village of Zakam was the only settlement to record a population of 0. According to the 2011 census, it's populated only from June to September.

=== List of Villages ===
Village	Population (2011)	Population (2016)
Asiab Sar	83	76
Boneh Zamin	356	391
Chak Rud	37	27
Chamchal	172	166
Garmavar	123	120
Gilakash	97	70
Haft Band	58	45
Jaliseh	628	516
Jaran	31	25
Kalak	283	261
Karsang-e Shahi Jan	85	55
Komoni	161	148
Lardeh	99	81
Lavali	31	30
Liyeh Chak	41	33
Molla Mahalleh	163	155
Pey Navand	139	120
Pir Kuh-e Olya	541	588
Pir Kuh-e Sofla	139	127
Pishkeli Jan-e Bala	117	114
Pishkeli Jan-e Pain	109	66
Sardsar-e Shahi Jan	43	22
Talijan Kar	30	28
Vasmeh Jan	91	87
Yareshlaman	169	149
Yasan	49	45
Zakam	0	0
Zenash	85	41
Zenash Darreh	20	12
