= Leyeh, Mazandaran =

Leyeh ليه
- Village
- Interactive map of Leyeh
- Coordinates: 36.762°N 50.809°E
- Country: Iran
- Province: Mazandaran
- County: Tonekabon
- Bakhsh: Central
- Rural District: Goli Jan

Population (2011)
  - Total: 14
- Time zone: UTC+3:30 (IRST)

Leyeh (Persian: ليه) is a village in Goli Jan Rural District, in the Central District of Tonekabon County, Mazandaran Province, Iran.

At the time of the 2006 National Census, the village's population was 16 in 7 households. The following census in 2011 counted 14 people in 4 households. The 2016 census measured less than 4 households.
