= PASH (band) =

Australian pop rock band

- Origin: Adelaide, South Australia
- Genre: Pop rock
- Years active: 2023–present
- Label: AWAL
- Members: Jett Gazley; Orlando Elliot; Nic Bergoc; Danny Maclean

PASH is an Australian pop rock band formed in Adelaide, South Australia, in 2023. Its members are vocalist Jett Gazley, guitarist Orlando Elliot, bassist Nic Bergoc and drummer Danny Maclean. It released its debut extended play (EP), Pulse, in 2024 and a self-titled EP in 2026.

== History ==
Bergoc and Elliot played together in another band before forming Pash with Gazley and Maclean. Pash self-produced its debut EP, Pulse, which came out in 2024. After signing with AWAL, Pash released "Tracy" in November 2025.

In February 2026, Pash played the Adelaide edition of the Laneway Festival after winning the local triple j Unearthed competition. AWAL released the band's self-titled EP on 22 May 2026. The EP's "East End Girls" draws on the band's ties to Adelaide's East End. Mitch Mosk of Atwood Magazine described the EP's guitar pop and alternative rock influences and identified themes of infatuation, heartbreak and grief.

In September 2026, Pash performed at the BIGSOUND showcase in Brisbane. The band released "Suffer" later that month during a national tour. Nadia Luksich of CityMag noted new wave elements in the single.

== Discography ==
=== Extended plays ===
- Pulse (2024)
- PASH (2026)
