= Lure =

Lure or luring may refer to:

== Objects ==
- Lure (falconry), a chase object used in falconry
- Fishing lure, an object to attract fish
- Lur or Lure, a musical instrument
- Bait (luring substance), the substance used in luring

== Biology ==
Several types of aggressive mimicry:

- Acoustical luring
- Caudal luring
- Lingual luring

== Geography ==
=== Albania ===
- Lurë, a municipality in the Dibër district, in Albania
- Lurë National Park

=== France ===
- Lure, Haute-Saône, a commune in the department of Haute-Saône
- Arrondissement of Lure, an arrondissement in the department of Haute-Saône
- Luré, a commune in the Loire department

=== United States ===
- Lake Lure, North Carolina

== Film and television ==
- The Lure (1914 film), an American melodrama on prostitution
- The Lure (1933 film), a British film
- The Lure (2015 film), a Polish film
- "The Lure", a 1967 episode of Gunsmoke

== Books ==
- The Lure, a 1912 book by Lady E. S. Drower
- The Lure, a 1979 book by Felice Picano
- The Lure, a 2002 book by Bill Napier
- Lure, a 2003 book by Dilys Rose
- The Lure, a 2014 book by Lynne Ewing

== Music ==
- The Lure (Main Theme), song from The Idol TV series (2023)

== Other uses ==
- Lure (horse), a racehorse
- Laboratoire pour l'utilisation du rayonnement électromagnétique, the operator of the SOLEIL synchrotron in Orsay, France

== See also ==
- Lur, Iran (disambiguation)
- Lurs (disambiguation)
