= Lor (musician) =

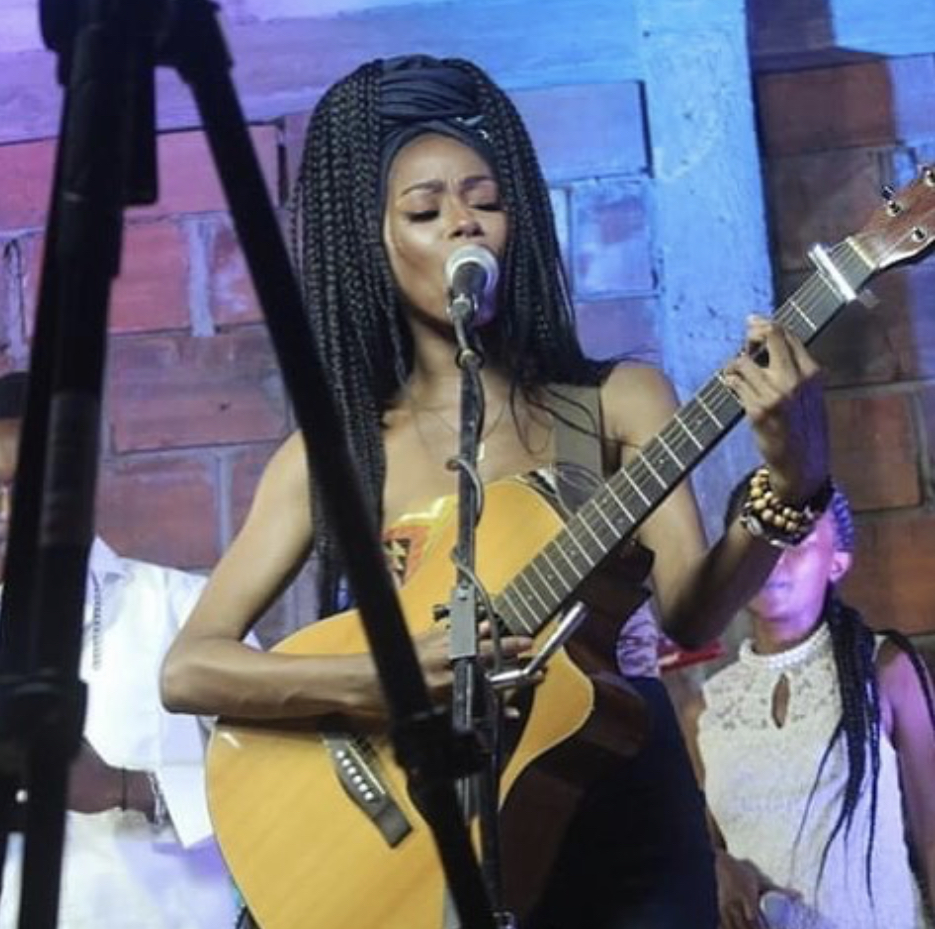
- Lor performing at the Laboratoire Musical de Bastos, Yaoundé, Cameroon

Background information
- Also known as: Golden Lor, Laelaure, L'or
- Born: Laetitia Laure Nsoutou; 3 September 1991 (age 34); Yaounde, Cameroon
- Origin: Yaounde, Cameroon
- Genres: hip hop; rnb; afro-soul; world music; afro-pop
- Occupations: Rapper; singer-songwriter; multi-instrumentist
- Instruments: Vocals; guitar; keyboard
- Years active: 2011–present
- Labels: New Bell Music; Indie

Laetitia Laure Nsoutou, better known as her stage name Lor is a Cameroonian rapper, singer-songwriter, actress, animator, and multi-instrumentist. Her Extended Play (EP) Dawn, is according to Samuel Lacmene, founder of Stillac, "an album that exudes freshness", where she "managed to send strong messages, but above all to transmit emotions through her particular vocal timbre".

== Career ==
=== 2011 – 2016 ===
Lor began her professional career in 2011, when she joined "Troupe Rue 1113" and performed as actress, dancer, singer and songwriter for the first musical film ever produced in Cameroon, "Rendez-vous avec les morts", written by Elena Serna. Until 2016, she adopted the moniker "Laelaure" and collaborated with various artists like Festus and Willis Beats. She also collaborated with artist Worlasi on his song "No Matter", and directed/co-produced his animated music video "Cartoon", which is considered one of the coolest music videos from Africa.

=== 2016 – New Bell Music ===
Lor joined New Bell Music as a recording artist in 2016, and was mentored by the rapper and producer Jovi. As an introduction, she is featured on Pascal's debut single "Manka’a Remix". The video directed by Tatapong Beyala was well received. She also collaborated in his album Work Dey 3 on the title "I No Kam Fine" and later appeared on the song "ICI" by Tata the following year. Although an announcement was made on her working on her EP, she will not release any solo project under New Bell Music, which will trigger interrogations about her being "neglected" under the label.

=== 2018 – Independent ===
In June 2018, Lor released a Freestyle video as a now independent artist. Produced by Method J and directed by Tatapong Beyala, the video was featured on the Daymolition platform. In November 2018, she released her debut official single "Tourne pas le dos" which is a song with afro pop sonorities produced by Sango Edi and directed by Walter Enow which received positive reviews. In 2019, she collaborated with AFRIMA nominated artist WAZIH on the title "Fighter" produced by Method J Beats, from his Extended Play Anotic and in December 2019, she releases her sophomore single, "On Connait" an afro pop song produced by Sangtum which was well received by the public. As part of the Street Corner collective, she performed at La Case des Arts and the Street Corner and l'Institut Français du Cameroun.

=== Dawn the EP ===
In February 2020, Lor releases the music video "Stop/Rewind", directed by Tatapong Beyala and executively produced by the Gurl Boss Production. The song, produced by Method J is aimed to be the leading single of her first studio project Dawn, an Extended play of 7 tracks. The video production process was featured on a Reuters documentary. The Project is released in July 2020 and is produced by Method J Beats, Elisha Kay and Tony Ef, with guest appearances by WAZIH on the song "Broken" and by Empawa 2020 Laureate, rapper Yung Meagan on the track "Balek".

== Discography ==
=== Singles ===
- "Holdin On", (2015)
- "Tourne pas le dos", (2018)
- "On connaît", (2019)
- "Stop/Rewind", (2020)

=== Extended play ===
- Dawn, (2020)

=== Guest appearances ===
Title	Year	Other performer(s)	Album
"No Matter"	2016	Worlasi	The Uncut
"Manka'a Remix"	2016	Pascal	
"I No Kam Fine"	2017	Pascal	Work Dey 3
"ICI"	2017	Tata	
"Fighter"	2019	WAZIH	Anotic

=== Other songs ===
- "You Come First", (2012)
- "Click Pow", (2013)
- "Believe", (2014)
