= Lur, West Azerbaijan =

Lur لور
- Village
- Location within Iran
- Coordinates: 37°36′31″N 44°57′54″E
- Country: Iran
- Province: West Azerbaijan
- County: Urmia
- Bakhsh: Central
- Rural District: Rowzeh Chay

Population (2006)
  - Total: 317
- Time zone: UTC+3:30 (IRST)
  - Summer (DST): UTC+4:30 (IRDT)

Lur (Persian: لور, also Romanized as Lūr; also known as Lūrbālā Jūq) is a village in Rowzeh Chay Rural District, in the Central District of Urmia County, West Azerbaijan Province, Iran. At the 2006 census, its population was 317, in 73 families.
