= Deylaman Rural District =

Rural district in Gilan province, Iran

Deylaman Rural District Persian: دهستان دیلمان
- Rural District
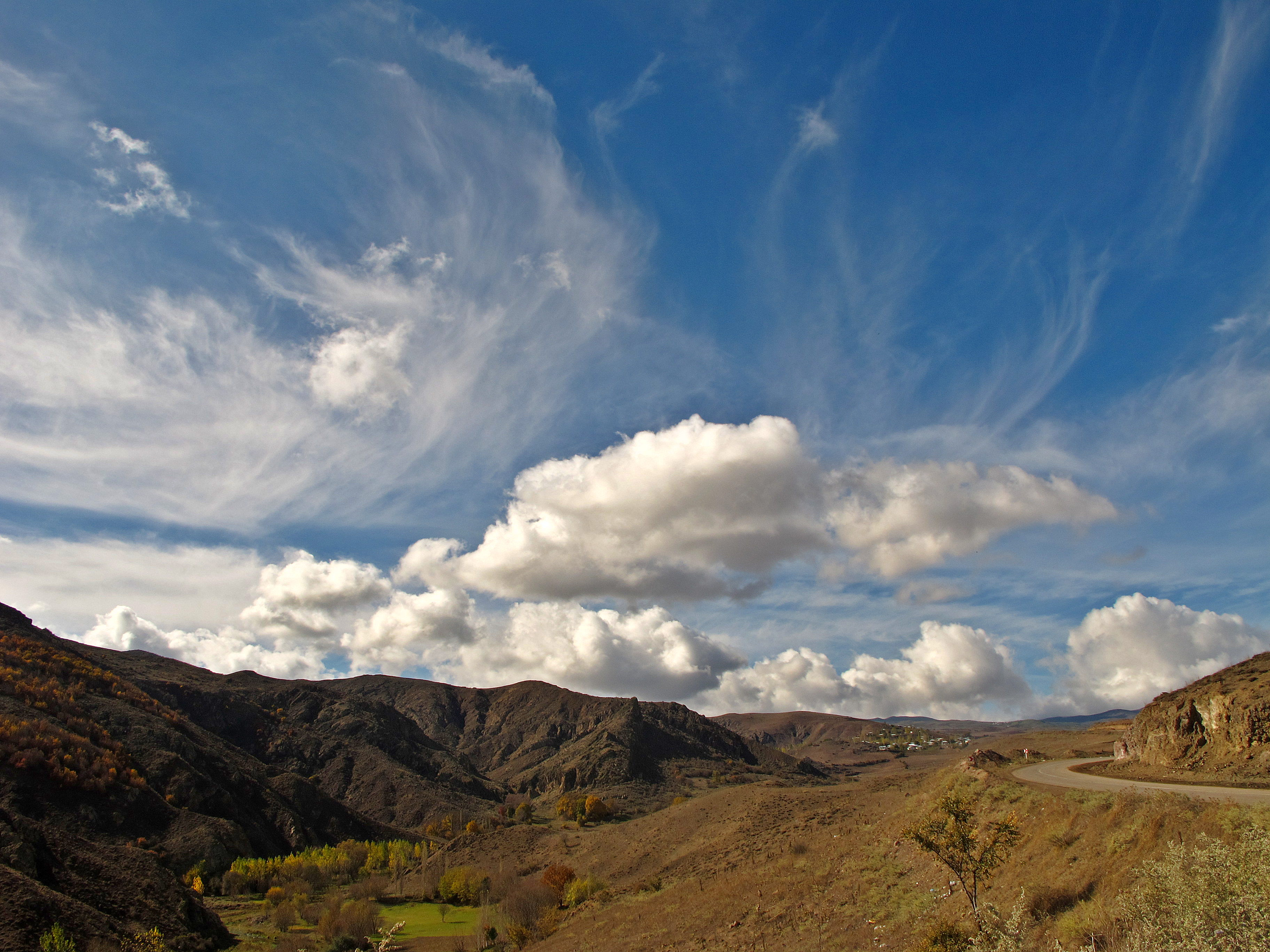
- Landscape in Deylaman Rural District

- Location within Iran
- Coordinates: 36°53′N 49°53′E
- Country: Iran
- Province: Gilan
- County: Siahkal
- District: Deylaman
- Established: 1987
- Capital: Deylaman

Population (2016)
  - Total: 5,270
- Time zone: UTC+3:30 (IRST)

Deylaman Rural District (Persian: دهستان دیلمان) is in Deylaman District of Siahkal County, Gilan province, Iran. It is administered from the city of Deylaman.

== Demographics ==
=== Population ===
At the time of the 2006 National Census, the district's population was 6,827 in 2,049 households. There were 5,543 inhabitants in 1,953 households at the following census of 2011. The 2016 census measured the population of the district as 5,270 in 1,998 households. The most populous of its 75 villages was Kuh Pas, with 486 people.

According to 2016 census, there were 75 settlements in the rural district, 22 with a population of zero, and seven others below the reporting threshold.

=== Other villages in the rural district ===
- Arushki
- Asiabar
- Diar Jan
- Eyn-e Sheykh
- Gulak
- Khorram Rud
- Koshti Girchak
- Liyeh
- Lur
- Mikal
- Molumeh
- Nowruz Mahalleh
- Qeshlaq
- Raz Darrud
