= Deylaman District =

District in Gilan province, Iran

Deylaman District Persian: بخش دیلمان
- District
- Location within Iran
- Coordinates: 36°50′N 49°56′E
- Country: Iran
- Province: Gilan
- County: Siahkal
- Established: 1994
- Capital: Deylaman

Population (2016)
  - Total: 10,597
- Time zone: UTC+3:30 (IRST)

Deylaman District (Persian: بخش دیلمان) is in Siahkal County, Gilan province, Iran. Its capital is the city of Deylaman.

== Demographics ==
=== Population ===
At the time of the 2006 National Census, the district's population was 12,721 in 3,650 households. The following census in 2011 counted 11,178 people in 3,715 households. The 2016 census measured the population of the district as 10,597 inhabitants in 3,804 households.

=== Administrative divisions ===
Deylaman District Population
Administrative Divisions	2006	2011	2016
Deylaman RD	6,827	5,543	5,270
Pir Kuh RD	4,633	3,979	3,598
Deylaman (city)	1,261	1,656	1,729
Total	12,721	11,178	10,597
RD = Rural District
