= Mehraban =

Mehraban may refer to:

- Katnaghbyur, Aragatsotn, a town in Armenia
- Mehraban, Iran, a city in West Azerbaijan Province, Iran
- Mehraban, Gilan, a village in Gilan Province, Iran
- Mehraban, Kohgiluyeh and Boyer-Ahmad, a village in Kohgiluyeh and Boyer-Ahmad Province, Iran
- Mehraban, Lorestan, a village in Lorestan Province, Iran
- Mehraban District, an administrative subdivision of Iran
- Mehraban (sheep), a breed of sheep
