= Rajurazbaram =

Rajurazbaram رجورازبرم
- Village
- Country: Iran
- Province: Gilan
- County: Siahkal
- Bakhsh: Central
- Rural District: Malfejan

Population (2006)
  - Total: 194
- Time zone: UTC+3:30 (IRST)

Rajurazbaram (Persian: رجورازبرم, also Romanized as Rajūrāzbaram) is a village in Malfejan Rural District, in the Central District of Siahkal County, Gilan Province, Iran. At the 2016 census, its population was 151, in 53 families. Down from 194 people in 2006.
