= Lunak =

Lunak لونک
- Village
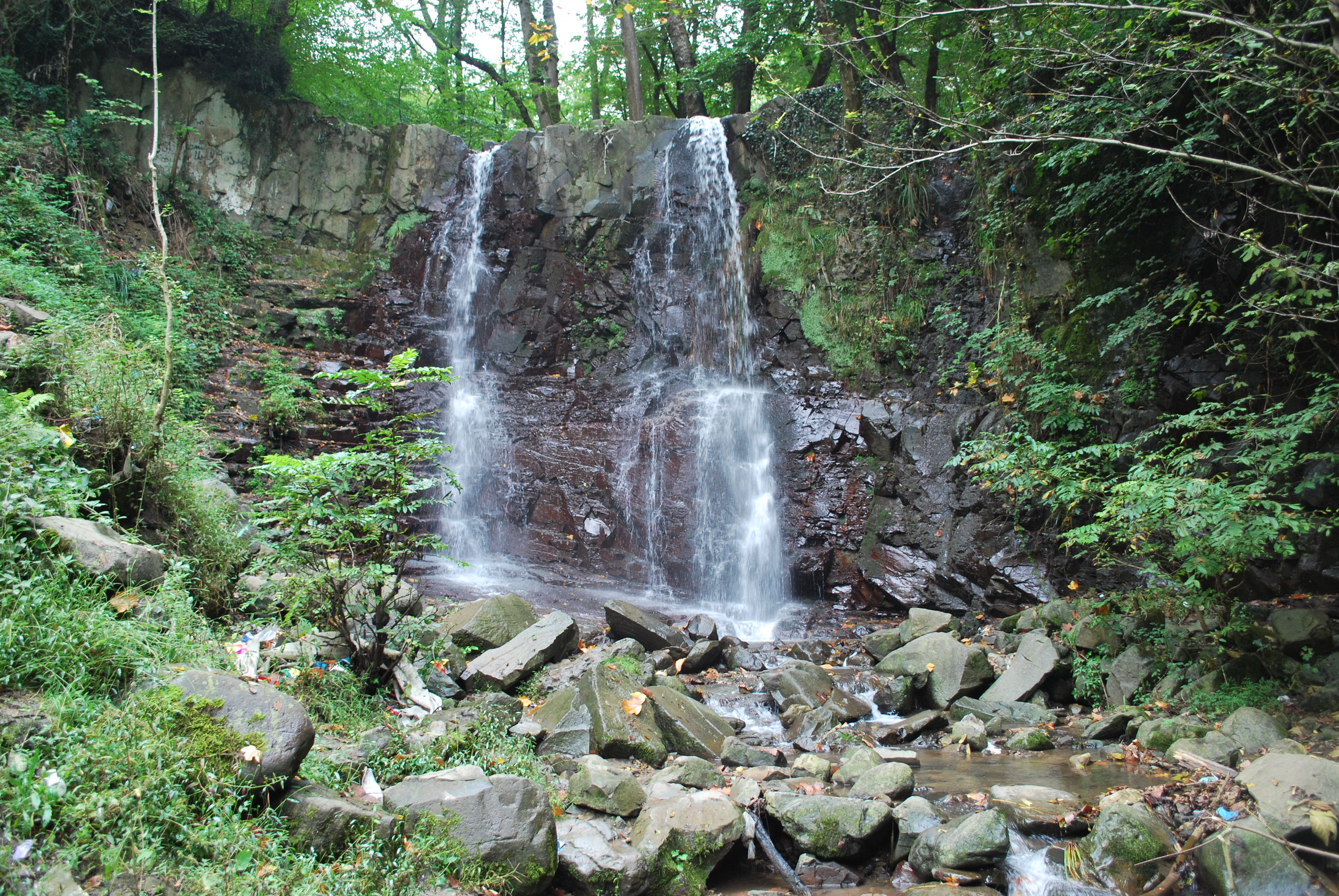
- Lunak Waterfall

- Location within Iran
- Coordinates: 37°02′14″N 49°53′23″E
- Country: Iran
- Province: Gilan
- County: Siahkal
- Bakhsh: Central
- Rural District: Tutaki

Population (2006)
  - Total: 20
- Time zone: UTC+3:30 (IRST)

Lunak (Persian: لونک, also Romanized as Lūnak) is a village in Tutaki Rural District, in the Central District of Siahkal County, Gilan province, Iran. At the 2006 census, its population was 20, consisting of 5 families. In 2016, Lunak had less than 4 households.
