= Chufolki =

Chufolki چوفلكی
- Village
- Location within Iran
- Coordinates: 37°09′17″N 49°55′35″E
- Country: Iran
- Province: Gilan
- County: Siahkal
- Bakhsh: Central
- Rural District: Malfejan

Population (2006)
  - Total: 134
- Time zone: UTC+3:30 (IRST)

Chufolki (Persian: چوفلكی, also Romanized as Chūfolkī; also known as Chofolkī) is a village in Malfejan Rural District, in the Central District of Siahkal County, Gilan Province, Iran. At the 2016 census, its population was 110, in 46 families. Down from 134 in 2006.
