= Kolah Duz Mahalleh =

Kolah Duz Mahalleh كلاهدوزمحله
- Village
- Country: Iran
- Province: Gilan
- County: Siahkal
- Bakhsh: Central
- Rural District: Malfejan

Population (2006)
  - Total: 201
- Time zone: UTC+3:30 (IRST)

Kolah Duz Mahalleh (Persian: كلاهدوزمحله, also Romanized as Kolāh Dūz Maḩalleh) is a village in Malfejan Rural District, in the Central District of Siahkal County, Gilan Province, Iran. At the 2016 census, its population was 154, in 50 families. Down from 201 people in 2006.
