= Kal Sar =

Kal Sar كل سر
- Village
- Country: Iran
- Province: Gilan
- County: Siahkal
- Bakhsh: Central
- Rural District: Malfejan

Population (2006)
  - Total: 110
- Time zone: UTC+3:30 (IRST)

Kal Sar (Persian: كل سر) is a village in Malfejan Rural District, in the Central District of Siahkal County, Gilan Province, Iran. At the 2016 census, its population was 51, in 24 families. Down from 110 people in 2006.
