= Alibeyk Sara =

Alibeyk Sara علی بيک سرا
- Village
- Location within Iran
- Coordinates: 37°11′05″N 49°51′00″E
- Country: Iran
- Province: Gilan
- County: Siahkal
- Bakhsh: Central
- Rural District: Malfejan

Population (2006)
  - Total: 79
- Time zone: UTC+3:30 (IRST)

Alibeyk Sara (Persian: علی بيک سرا, also Romanized as ‘Alībeyk Sarā) is a village in Malfejan Rural District, in the Central District of Siahkal County, Gilan Province, Iran. At the 2016 census, its population was 45, in 21 families. Down from 79 in 2006.
