= Chehel Gacheh =

Chehel Gacheh چهل گاچه
- Village
- Location within Iran
- Coordinates: 37°04′30″N 49°46′30″E
- Country: Iran
- Province: Gilan
- County: Siahkal
- Bakhsh: Central
- Rural District: Khara Rud

Population (2006)
  - Total: 76
- Time zone: UTC+3:30 (IRST)
  - Summer (DST): UTC+4:30 (IRDT)

Chehel Gacheh (Persian: چهل گاچه, also Romanized as Chehel Gācheh; also known as Chehel Kācheh) is a village in Khara Rud Rural District, in the Central District of Siahkal County, Gilan Province, Iran. At the 2006 census, its population was 76, in 17 families.
