= Gilbam =

Gilbam گيل بام
- Village
- Location within Iran
- Coordinates: 37°04′11″N 49°46′39″E
- Country: Iran
- Province: Gilan
- County: Siahkal
- Bakhsh: Central
- Rural District: Khara Rud

Population (2006)
  - Total: 129
- Time zone: UTC+3:30 (IRST)
  - Summer (DST): UTC+4:30 (IRDT)

Gilbam (Persian: گيل بام, also Romanized as Gīlbām; also known as Galeh Bām) is a village in Khara Rud Rural District, in the Central District of Siahkal County, Gilan Province, Iran. At the 2006 census, its population was 129, in 34 families.
