= Bijar Sara =

Bijar Sara بيجارسرا
- Village
- Location within Iran
- Coordinates: 37°03′04″N 49°54′00″E
- Country: Iran
- Province: Gilan
- County: Siahkal
- Bakhsh: Central
- Rural District: Tutaki

Population (2006)
  - Total: 60
- Time zone: UTC+3:30 (IRST)
  - Summer (DST): UTC+4:30 (IRDT)

Bijar Sara (Persian: بيجارسرا, also Romanized as Bījār Sarā) is a village in Tutaki Rural District, in the Central District of Siahkal County, Gilan Province, Iran. At the 2006 census, its population was 60, in 15 families.
