= Tui Dasht =

Tui Dasht تويي دشت
- Village
- Location within Iran
- Coordinates: 37°03′52″N 49°46′47″E
- Country: Iran
- Province: Gilan
- County: Siahkal
- Bakhsh: Central
- Rural District: Khara Rud

Population (2006)
  - Total: 20
- Time zone: UTC+3:30 (IRST)
  - Summer (DST): UTC+4:30 (IRDT)

Tui Dasht (Persian: تويي دشت, also Romanized as Tū’ī Dasht) is a village in Khara Rud Rural District, in the Central District of Siahkal County, Gilan Province, Iran. At the 2006 census, its population was 20, in 4 families.
