= Lusha Deh =

Lusha Deh لوشاده
- Village
- Location within Iran
- Coordinates: 37°02′38″N 49°55′17″E
- Country: Iran
- Province: Gilan
- County: Siahkal
- Bakhsh: Central
- Rural District: Tutaki

Population (2006)
  - Total: 103
- Time zone: UTC+3:30 (IRST)
  - Summer (DST): UTC+4:30 (IRDT)

Lusha Deh (Persian: لوشاده, also Romanized as Lūshā Deh; also known as Lūshādī) is a village in Tutaki Rural District, in the Central District of Siahkal County, Gilan Province, Iran. At the 2006 census, its population was 103, in 28 families.
