= Korf Poshteh-ye Ilyati =

Village in Gilan, Iran

Korf Poshteh-ye Ilyati كرف پشته ايلياتي
- Village
- Location within Iran
- Coordinates: 37°08′24″N 49°52′03″E
- Country: Iran
- Province: Gilan
- County: Siahkal
- Bakhsh: Central
- Rural District: Tutaki

Population (2006)
  - Total: 51
- Time zone: UTC+3:30 (IRST)
  - Summer (DST): UTC+4:30 (IRDT)

Korf Poshteh-ye Ilyati (Persian: كرف پشته ايلياتي, also Romanized as Korf Poshteh-ye Īlyātī) is a village in Tutaki Rural District, in the Central District of Siahkal County, Gilan Province, Iran. At the 2006 census, its population was 51, in 16 families.
