= Maldeh =

Maldeh مالده
- Village
- Location within Iran
- Coordinates: 37°10′48″N 49°49′42″E
- Country: Iran
- Province: Gilan
- County: Siahkal
- Bakhsh: Central
- Rural District: Malfejan

Population (2006)
  - Total: 183
- Time zone: UTC+3:30 (IRST)

Maldeh (Persian: مالده, also Romanized as Māldeh) is a village in Malfejan Rural District, in the Central District of Siahkal County, Gilan Province, Iran. At the 2016 census, its population was 170, in 64 families. Down from 183 people in 2006.
