= Azarcheh =

Azarcheh اذرچه
- Village
- Location within Iran
- Coordinates: 37°04′54″N 49°49′07″E
- Country: Iran
- Province: Gilan
- County: Siahkal
- Bakhsh: Central
- Rural District: Tutaki

Population (2006)
  - Total: 50
- Time zone: UTC+3:30 (IRST)
  - Summer (DST): UTC+4:30 (IRDT)

Azarcheh (Persian: اذرچه, also Romanized as Āẕarcheh; also known as Bālā Āẕarcheh) is a village in Tutaki Rural District, in the Central District of Siahkal County, Gilan Province, Iran. At the 2006 census, its population was 50, in 12 families.
