= Karaf Kol =

Karaf Kol كرف كل
- Village
- Location within Iran
- Coordinates: 37°08′19″N 49°56′23″E
- Country: Iran
- Province: Gilan
- County: Siahkal
- Bakhsh: Central
- Rural District: Malfejan

Population (2016)
  - Total: 22
- Time zone: UTC+3:30 (IRST)

Karaf Kol (Persian: كرف كل'; also known as Korfgol-e Chushal) is a village in Malfejan Rural District, in the Central District of Siahkal County, Gilan Province, Iran. At the 2016 census, its population was 22, in 9 families. Up from 19 in 2006.
