= Bar Poshteh Sar =

Bar Poshteh Sar برپشته سر
- Village
- Country: Iran
- Province: Gilan
- County: Siahkal
- Bakhsh: Central
- Rural District: Malfejan

Population (2006)
  - Total: 77
- Time zone: UTC+3:30 (IRST)

Bar Poshteh Sar (Persian: برپشته سر) is a village in Malfejan Rural District, in the Central District of Siahkal County, Gilan Province, Iran. At the 2016 census, its population was 69, in 28 families. Down from 77 in 2006.
