= Butestan =

Butestan بوتستان
- Village
- Country: Iran
- Province: Gilan
- County: Siahkal
- Bakhsh: Central
- Rural District: Malfejan

Population (2006)
  - Total: 14
- Time zone: UTC+3:30 (IRST)

Butestan (Persian: بوتستان, also Romanized as Būtestān) is a village in Malfejan Rural District, in the Central District of Siahkal County, Gilan Province, Iran. At the 2006 census, its population was 14, in 4 families. In 2016, the population of the village was 0.
