= Shirkuh Mahalleh =

Shirkuh Mahalleh شيركوه محله
- Village
- Country: Iran
- Province: Gilan
- County: Siahkal
- Bakhsh: Central
- Rural District: Malfejan

Population (2006)
  - Total: 72
- Time zone: UTC+3:30 (IRST)

Shirkuh Mahalleh (Persian: شيركوه محله, also Romanized as Shīrkūh Maḩalleh) is a village in Malfejan Rural District, in the Central District of Siahkal County, Gilan Province, Iran. At the 2016 census, its population was 47, in 20 families. Down from 72 people in 2006.
