= Bijar Posht =

Bijar Posht بيجارپشت
- Village
- Country: Iran
- Province: Gilan
- County: Siahkal
- Bakhsh: Central
- Rural District: Malfejan

Population (2006)
  - Total: 73
- Time zone: UTC+3:30 (IRST)

Bijar Posht (Persian: بيجارپشت, also Romanized as Bījār Posht) is a village in Malfejan Rural District, in the Central District of Siahkal County, Gilan Province, Iran. At the 2016 census, its population was 51, in 17 families. Down from 73 people in 2006.
