= Kashki, Iran =

Kashki كاشكي
- Village
- Location within Iran
- Coordinates: 37°06′31″N 49°49′47″E
- Country: Iran
- Province: Gilan
- County: Siahkal
- Bakhsh: Central
- Rural District: Tutaki

Population (2006)
  - Total: 117
- Time zone: UTC+3:30 (IRST)
  - Summer (DST): UTC+4:30 (IRDT)

Kashki (Persian: كاشكي, also Romanized as Kāshkī) is a village in Tutaki Rural District, in the Central District of Siahkal County, Gilan Province, Iran. At the 2006 census, its population was 117, in 34 families.
