= Rubarabr =

Rubarabr روبرابر
- Village
- Country: Iran
- Province: Gilan
- County: Siahkal
- Bakhsh: Central
- Rural District: Malfejan

Population (2006)
  - Total: 98
- Time zone: UTC+3:30 (IRST)

Rubarabr (Persian: روبرابر, also Romanized as Rūbarābr) is a village in Malfejan Rural District, in the Central District of Siahkal County, Gilan Province, Iran. At the 2016 census, its population was 80, in 32 families. Down from 98 in 2006.
