= Radar Poshteh =

Village in Gilan, Iran

Radar Poshteh رادارپشته
- Village
- Location within Iran
- Coordinates: 37°04′50″N 49°43′55″E
- Country: Iran
- Province: Gilan
- County: Siahkal
- Bakhsh: Central
- Rural District: Khara Rud

Population (2006)
  - Total: 293
- Time zone: UTC+3:30 (IRST)
  - Summer (DST): UTC+4:30 (IRDT)

Radar Poshteh (Persian: رادارپشته, also Romanized as Rādār Poshteh; also known as Rādār Poshteh-ye Bālā) is a village in Khara Rud Rural District, in the Central District of Siahkal County, Gilan Province, Iran. At the 2006 census, its population was 293, in 67 families.
