= Asbrahan =

Asbrahan اسبراهان
- Village
- Location within Iran
- Coordinates: 37°08′00″N 49°50′16″E
- Country: Iran
- Province: Gilan
- County: Siahkal
- Bakhsh: Central
- Rural District: Tutaki

Population (2006)
  - Total: 87
- Time zone: UTC+3:30 (IRST)
  - Summer (DST): UTC+4:30 (IRDT)

Asbrahan (Persian: اسبراهان, also Romanized as Asbrāhān; also known as Asb Rāhān) is a village in Tutaki Rural District, in the Central District of Siahkal County, Gilan Province, Iran. At the 2006 census, its population was 87, in 22 families.
