= Galesh-e Musha =

Galesh-e Musha گالش موشا
- Village
- Location within Iran
- Coordinates: 37°07′33″N 49°54′11″E
- Country: Iran
- Province: Gilan
- County: Siahkal
- Bakhsh: Central
- Rural District: Malfejan

Population (2006)
  - Total: 91
- Time zone: UTC+3:30 (IRST)

Galesh-e Musha (Persian: گالش موشا, also Romanized as Gālesh-e Mūshā) is a village in Malfejan Rural District, in the Central District of Siahkal County, Gilan Province, Iran. At the 2016 census, its population was 58, in 26 families. Down from 91 people in 2006.
