= Lelam, Iran =

Lelam للم
- Village
- Location within Iran
- Coordinates: 37°08′32″N 49°53′26″E
- Country: Iran
- Province: Gilan
- County: Siahkal
- Bakhsh: Central
- Rural District: Malfejan

Population (2016)
  - Total: 44
- Time zone: UTC+3:30 (IRST)

Lelam (Persian: للم) is a village in Malfejan Rural District, in the Central District of Siahkal County, Gilan Province, Iran. At the 2016 census, its population was 44, in 14families.
