= Gavkul =

Gavkul گاوكول
- Village
- Location within Iran
- Coordinates: 37°04′46″N 49°46′23″E
- Country: Iran
- Province: Gilan
- County: Siahkal
- Bakhsh: Central
- Rural District: Khara Rud

Population (2006)
  - Total: 265
- Time zone: UTC+3:30 (IRST)
  - Summer (DST): UTC+4:30 (IRDT)

Gavkul (Persian: گاوكول, also Romanized as Gāvkūl) is a village in Khara Rud Rural District, in the Central District of Siahkal County, Gilan Province, Iran. At the 2006 census, its population was 265, in 60 families.
