= Dazrud =

Dazrud دزرود
- Village
- Location within Iran
- Coordinates: 37°06′45″N 49°54′11″E
- Country: Iran
- Province: Gilan
- County: Siahkal
- Bakhsh: Central
- Rural District: Malfejan

Population (2006)
  - Total: 37
- Time zone: UTC+3:30 (IRST)

Dazrud (Persian: دزرود, also Romanized as Dazrūd; also known as Duzrud-e Bala) is a village in Malfejan Rural District, in the Central District of Siahkal County, Gilan Province, Iran. At the 2016 census, its population was 28, in 11 families. Down from 37 people in 2006.
