= Bidrun =

Bidrun بيدرون
- Village
- Location within Iran
- Coordinates: 37°11′12″N 49°52′06″E
- Country: Iran
- Province: Gilan
- County: Siahkal
- Bakhsh: Central
- Rural District: Malfejan

Population (2016)
  - Total: 271
- Time zone: UTC+3:30 (IRST)

Bidrun (Persian: بيدرون, also Romanized as Bīdrūn; also known as Bidurun) is a village in Malfejan Rural District, in the Central District of Siahkal County, Gilan Province, Iran. At the 2016 census, its population was 271, in 107 families. Up from 236 people in 2006.
