= Jan Sherud =

Jan Sherud جانشرود
- Village
- Location within Iran
- Coordinates: 37°04′47″N 49°53′59″E
- Country: Iran
- Province: Gilan
- County: Siahkal
- Bakhsh: Central
- Rural District: Tutaki

Population (2006)
  - Total: 54
- Time zone: UTC+3:30 (IRST)
  - Summer (DST): UTC+4:30 (IRDT)

Jan Sherud (Persian: جانشرود, also Romanized as Jān Sherūd; also known as Jāneshrūh) is a village in Tutaki Rural District, in the Central District of Siahkal County, Gilan Province, Iran. At the 2006 census, its population was 54, in 16 families.
