= Sikash, Iran =

Sikash سيكاش
- Village
- Location within Iran
- Coordinates: 37°02′07″N 49°50′19″E
- Country: Iran
- Province: Gilan
- County: Siahkal
- Bakhsh: Central
- Rural District: Tutaki

Population (2006)
  - Total: 97
- Time zone: UTC+3:30 (IRST)
  - Summer (DST): UTC+4:30 (IRDT)

Sikash (Persian: سيكاش, also Romanized as Sīkāsh; also known as Sīgāsh) is a village in Tutaki Rural District, in the Central District of Siahkal County, Gilan Province, Iran. At the 2006 census, its population was 97, in 26 families.
