= Kish Mahalleh =

Kish Mahalleh كيش محله
- Village
- Location within Iran
- Coordinates: 37°07′08″N 49°56′38″E
- Country: Iran
- Province: Gilan
- County: Siahkal
- Bakhsh: Central
- Rural District: Malfejan

Population (2006)
  - Total: 134
- Time zone: UTC+3:30 (IRST)

Kish Mahalleh (Persian: كيش محله, also Romanized as Kīsh Maḩalleh; also known as Kīshmaḩalleh-ye Chushal) is a village found in the Malfejan Rural District, in the Central District of Siahkal County, Gilan Province, Iran. At the 2016 census, its population was 102, in 41 families. Down from 134 people in 2006.
