= Salash-e Disam =

Salash-e Disam سلش ديسام
- Village
- Location within Iran
- Coordinates: 37°09′00″N 49°48′25″E
- Country: Iran
- Province: Gilan
- County: Siahkal
- Bakhsh: Central
- Rural District: Khara Rud

Population (2006)
  - Total: 77
- Time zone: UTC+3:30 (IRST)
  - Summer (DST): UTC+4:30 (IRDT)

Salash-e Disam (Persian: سلش ديسام, also Romanized as Salash-e Dīsām; also known as Salash) is a village in Khara Rud Rural District, in the Central District of Siahkal County, Gilan Province, Iran. At the 2006 census, its population was 77, in 22 families.
