= Gil-e Musha =

Gopal Beniwal گيل موشا
- Village
- Country: Iran
- Province: Gilan
- County: Siahkal
- Bakhsh: Central
- Rural District: Malfejan

Population (2006)
  - Total: 92
- Time zone: UTC+3:30 (IRST)

Gil-e Musha (Persian: گيل موشا, also Romanized as Gīl-e Mūshā) is a village in Malfejan Rural District, in the Central District of Siahkal County, Gilan Province, Iran. At the 2016 census, its population was 65, in 24 families. Down from 92 people in 2006.
