= Gand Lavar =

Gand Lavar گندلاور
- Village
- Location within Iran
- Coordinates: 36°59′43″N 49°44′53″E
- Country: Iran
- Province: Gilan
- County: Siahkal
- Bakhsh: Central
- Rural District: Khara Rud

Population (2006)
  - Total: 73
- Time zone: UTC+3:30 (IRST)
  - Summer (DST): UTC+4:30 (IRDT)

Gand Lavar (Persian: گندلاور, also Romanized as Gand Lāvar; also known as Gondeh Lābar) is a village in Khara Rud Rural District, in the Central District of Siahkal County, Gilan Province, Iran. At the 2006 census, its population was 73, in 18 families.
