= Saleh Kuh =

Saleh Kuh صالح كوه
- Village
- Location within Iran
- Coordinates: 37°04′11″N 49°50′55″E
- Country: Iran
- Province: Gilan
- County: Siahkal
- Bakhsh: Central
- Rural District: Tutaki

Population (2006)
  - Total: 85
- Time zone: UTC+3:30 (IRST)
  - Summer (DST): UTC+4:30 (IRDT)

Saleh Kuh (Persian: صالح كوه, also Romanized as Şāleḩ Kūh) is a village in Tutaki Rural District, in the Central District of Siahkal County, Gilan Province, Iran. At the 2006 census, its population was 85, in 24 families.
