= Madar Sara =

Madar Sara مادرسرا
- Village
- Location within Iran
- Coordinates: 37°01′33″N 49°45′54″E
- Country: Iran
- Province: Gilan
- County: Siahkal
- Bakhsh: Central
- Rural District: Khara Rud

Population (2006)
  - Total: 24
- Time zone: UTC+3:30 (IRST)
  - Summer (DST): UTC+4:30 (IRDT)

Madar Sara (Persian: مادرسرا, romanized as Mādar Sarā; also known as Mādar Sarā-ye Bālā) is a village in Khara Rud Rural District, in the Central District of Siahkal County, Gilan Province, Iran. At the 2006 census its population was 24, in 5 families.
