= Nayaji =

Nayaji نعيجی
- Village
- Location within Iran
- Coordinates: 37°03′55″N 49°58′27″E
- Country: Iran
- Province: Gilan
- County: Siahkal
- Bakhsh: Central
- Rural District: Malfejan

Population (2006)
  - Total: 113
- Time zone: UTC+3:30 (IRST)

Nayaji (Persian: نعيجی, also Romanized as Nayajī; also known as Nayaj and Nīach) is a village in Malfejan Rural District, in the Central District of Siahkal County, Gilan Province, Iran. At the 2016 census, its population was 84, in 29 families. Down from 113 people in 2006.
