= Kalnadan-e Bala =

Kalnadan-e Bala كلنادان بالا
- Village
- Location within Iran
- Coordinates: 37°06′07″N 49°51′56″E
- Country: Iran
- Province: Gilan
- County: Siahkal
- Bakhsh: Central
- Rural District: Tutaki

Population (2006)
  - Total: 113
- Time zone: UTC+3:30 (IRST)
  - Summer (DST): UTC+4:30 (IRDT)

Kalnadan-e Bala (Persian: كلنادان بالا, also Romanized as Kalnādān-e Bālā; also known as Bālākalnādān) is a village in Tutaki Rural District, in the Central District of Siahkal County, Gilan Province, Iran. At the 2006 census, its population was 113, in 29 families.
