= Erbeh Bon =

Erbeh Bon اربه بن
- Village
- Location within Iran
- Coordinates: 37°07′48″N 49°50′26″E
- Country: Iran
- Province: Gilan
- County: Siahkal
- Bakhsh: Central
- Rural District: Tutaki

Population (2006)
  - Total: 16
- Time zone: UTC+3:30 (IRST)
  - Summer (DST): UTC+4:30 (IRDT)

Erbeh Bon (Persian: اربه بن; also known as Esberahan) is a village in Tutaki Rural District, in the Central District of Siahkal County, Gilan Province, Iran. At the 2006 census, its population was 16, in 4 families.
