= Chushal =

Chushal چوشل
- Village
- Location within Iran
- Coordinates: 37°07′59″N 49°56′15″E
- Country: Iran
- Province: Gilan
- County: Siahkal
- Bakhsh: Central
- Rural District: Malfejan

Population (2016)
  - Total: 200
- Time zone: UTC+3:30 (IRST)

Chushal (Persian: چوشل, also Romanized as Chūshal, Chooshal, Choushal’, Chowshāl; also known as Chū Ahl) is a village in Malfejan Rural District, in the Central District of Siahkal County, Gilan Province, Iran. At the 2016 census, its population was 200, in 83 families.
