= Gerdkuh, Siahkal =

Gerdkuh گردكوه
- Village
- Location within Iran
- Coordinates: 37°03′19″N 49°47′48″E
- Country: Iran
- Province: Gilan
- County: Siahkal
- Bakhsh: Central
- Rural District: Khara Rud

Population (2006)
  - Total: 68
- Time zone: UTC+3:30 (IRST)
  - Summer (DST): UTC+4:30 (IRDT)

Gerdkuh (Persian: گردكوه, also Romanized as Gerdkūh) is a village in Khara Rud Rural District, in the Central District of Siahkal County, Gilan Province, Iran. At the 2006 census, its population was 68, in 16 families.
