= Bala Kala Gavabar =

Bala Kala Gavabar بالاكلاگوابر
- Village
- Location within Iran
- Coordinates: 37°07′32″N 49°53′52″E
- Country: Iran
- Province: Gilan
- County: Siahkal
- Bakhsh: Central
- Rural District: Malfejan

Population (2006)
  - Total: 75
- Time zone: UTC+3:30 (IRST)

Bala Kala Gavabar (Persian: بالاكلاگوابر, also Romanized as Bālā Kalā Gavābar; also known as Kalākāvar-e Bālā) is a village in Malfejan Rural District, in the Central District of Siahkal County, Gilan Province, Iran. At the 2016 census, its population was 40, in 14 families. Down from 75 people in 2006.
