= Tushi =

Village in Gilan province, Iran

Tushi Persian: توشي
- Village
- Location within Iran
- Coordinates: 37°06′23″N 49°52′32″E
- Country: Iran
- Province: Gilan
- County: Siahkal
- District: Central
- Rural District: Tutaki

Population (2016)
  - Total: 168
- Time zone: UTC+3:30 (IRST)

Tushi (Persian: توشي) (Note: Also romanized as Tūshī) is a village in Tutaki Rural District of the Central District in Siahkal County, Gilan province, Iran.

== Demographics ==
=== Population ===
At the time of the 2006 National Census, the village's population was 245 in 65 households. The following census in 2011 counted 199 people in 59 households. The 2016 census measured the population of the village as 168 people in 60 households.
