= Malfejan =

Village in Gilan province, Iran

Malfejan Persian: مالفجان
- Village
- Location within Iran
- Coordinates: 37°09′44″N 49°54′37″E
- Country: Iran
- Province: Gilan
- County: Siahkal
- District: Central
- Rural District: Malfejan

Population (2016)
  - Total: 855
- Time zone: UTC+3:30 (IRST)

Malfejan (Persian: مالفجان) (Note: Also romanized as Mālaf Jān and Mālfejān; also known as Mālfajāh, Mālfejān-e Bālā, and Murufudzhan) is a village in, and the capital of, Malfejan Rural District in the Central District of Siahkal County, Gilan province, Iran.

== Demographics ==
=== Population ===
At the time of the 2006 National Census, the village's population was 992 in 286 households. The following census in 2011 counted 966 people in 319 households. The 2016 census measured the population of the village as 855 people in 307 households. It was the most populous village in its rural district.
