= Lialehkal-e Pain =

Lialehkal-e Pain لياله كل پايين
- Village
- Location within Iran
- Coordinates: 37°04′52″N 49°53′57″E
- Country: Iran
- Province: Gilan
- County: Siahkal
- Bakhsh: Central
- Rural District: Tutaki

Population (2006)
  - Total: 20
- Time zone: UTC+3:30 (IRST)
  - Summer (DST): UTC+4:30 (IRDT)

Lialehkal-e Pain (Persian: لياله كل پايين, also Romanized as Līālehkal-e Pā’īn; also known as Līālekal) is a village in Tutaki Rural District, in the Central District of Siahkal County, Gilan Province, Iran.

== Demographics ==
In the 2006, its population was 20, in 5 families.

== Geography ==
The village is located in the northern part of Iran within Gilan Province, a region known for its humid subtropical climate, dense vegetation, and proximity to the Caspian Sea. Settlements in this area are typically surrounded by agricultural land and forested terrain.

== See also ==
- List of cities, towns and villages in Gilan Province
