= Namak Rudbar =

Village in Gilan province, Iran

Namak Rudbar Persian: نمک رودبار
- Village
- Location within Iran
- Country: Iran
- Province: Gilan
- County: Siahkal
- District: Central
- Rural District: Malfejan

Population (2016)
  - Total: 416
- Time zone: UTC+3:30 (IRST)

Namak Rudbar (Persian: نمک رودبار) (Note: Also romanized as Namak Rūdbār) is a village in Malfejan Rural District of the Central District in Siahkal County, Gilan province, Iran.

== Demographics ==
=== Population ===
At the time of the 2006 National Census, the village's population was 384 in 103 households. The following census in 2011 counted 499 people in 106 households. The 2016 census measured the population of the village as 416 people in 129 households.
