= Fashtal =

Village in Gilan province, Iran

Fashtal Persian: فشتال
- Village
- Location within Iran
- Coordinates: 37°08′22″N 49°49′31″E
- Country: Iran
- Province: Gilan
- County: Siahkal
- District: Central
- Rural District: Khara Rud

Population (2016)
  - Total: 777
- Time zone: UTC+3:30 (IRST)

Fashtal (Persian: فشتال) (Note: Also romanized as Fashtāl; also known as Fishtal) is a village in Khara Rud Rural District of the Central District in Siahkal County, Gilan province, Iran.

== Demographics ==
=== Population ===
At the time of the 2006 National Census, the village's population was 906 in 250 households. The following census in 2011 counted 849 people in 289 households. The 2016 census measured the population of the village as 777 people in 280 households.
