= Malek Rud =

Village in Gilan province, Iran

Malek Rud Persian: ملک رود
- Village
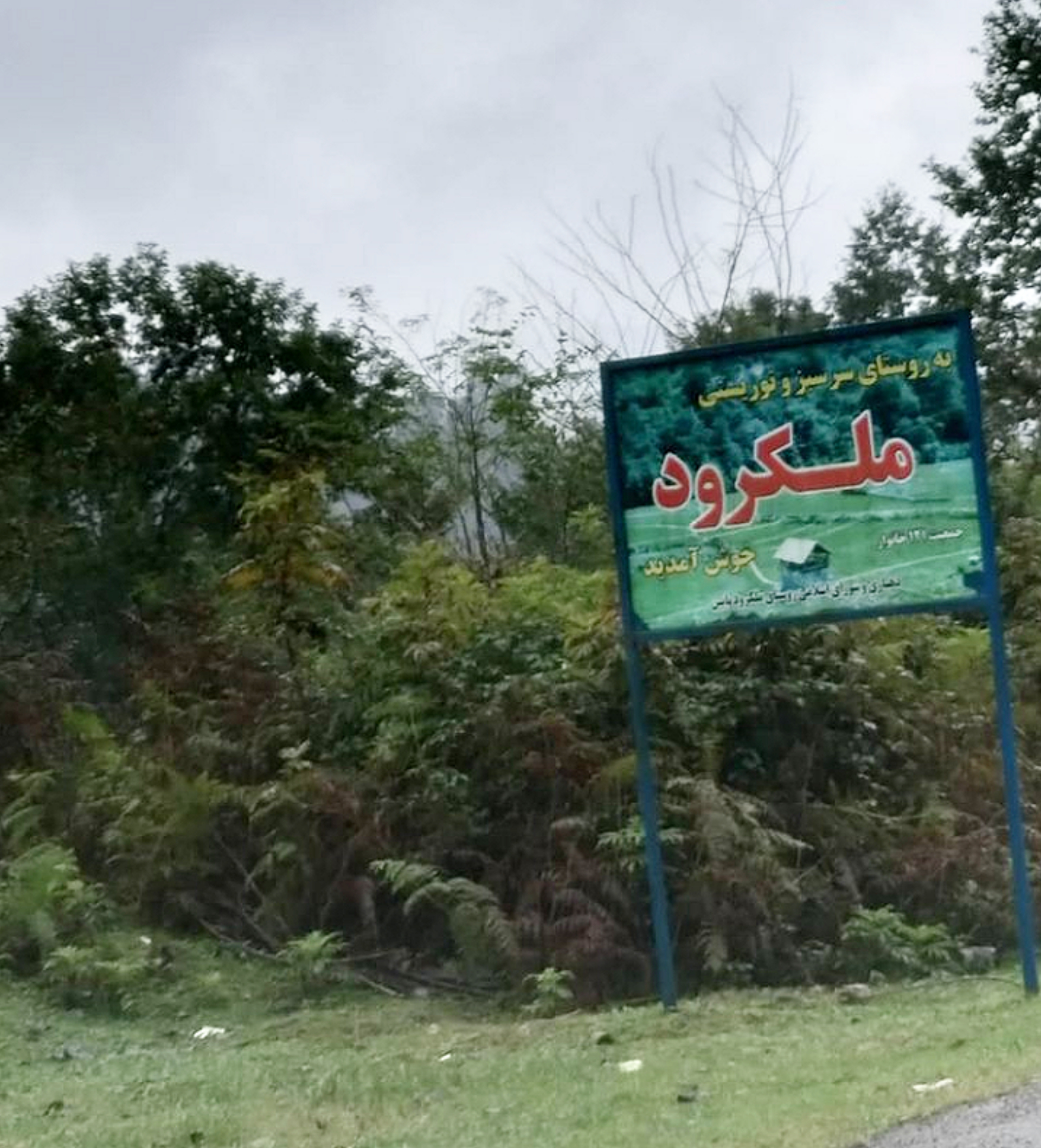
- Malek Rud Entrance

- Location within Iran
- Coordinates: 37°04′58″N 49°48′45″E
- Country: Iran
- Province: Gilan
- County: Siahkal
- District: Central
- Rural District: Khara Rud

Population (2016)
  - Total: 387
- Time zone: UTC+3:30 (IRST)

Malek Rud (Persian: ملك رود) (Note: Also romanized as Malek Rūd; also known as Malek Rūd-e Pā’īn and Malek Rūd-e Vasaţ) is a village in Khara Rud Rural District of the Central District in Siahkal County, Gilan province, Iran.

== Demographics ==
People of Malek Rud speak Persian and Gilaki languages. The agricultural activities of the village are Animal husbandry, with Dairy product and wool as the products. The religion of the people are Shia Islam.

=== Population ===
At the time of the 2006 National Census, the village's population was 596 in 140 households. The following census in 2011 counted 435 people in 130 households. The 2016 census measured the population of the village as 387 people in 133 households.
