= Chaleshom =

Village in Gilan province, Iran

Chaleshom Persian: چال شم
- Village
- Location within Iran
- Coordinates: 37°06′26″N 49°47′43″E
- Country: Iran
- Province: Gilan
- County: Siahkal
- District: Central
- Rural District: Khara Rud

Population (2016)
  - Total: 398
- Time zone: UTC+3:30 (IRST)

Chaleshom (Persian: چال شم) (Note: Also romanized as Chāleshom; also known as Chalisham and Chalistan) is a village in Khara Rud Rural District of the Central District in Siahkal County, Gilan province, Iran.

== Demographics ==
=== Population ===
At the time of the 2006 National Census, the village's population was 437 in 117 households. The following census in 2011 counted 409 people in 132 households. The 2016 census measured the population of the village as 398 people in 139 households.
