= Tazehabad-e Jankah =

Village in Gilan province, Iran

Tazehabad-e Jankah Persian: تازه اباد جانكاه
- Village
- Location within Iran
- Country: Iran
- Province: Gilan
- County: Siahkal
- District: Central
- Rural District: Khara Rud

Population (2016)
  - Total: 967
- Time zone: UTC+3:30 (IRST)

Tazehabad-e Jankah (Persian: تازه ابادجانكاه) (Note: Also romanized as Tāzehābād-e Jānkāh; also known as Tazabad, Tāzābād-e Jangā, Tāzābād-e Jangāh, Tazeh Abad Siyah Gol, Tāzehābād, and Tāzehābād-e Jongā) is a village in Khara Rud Rural District of the Central District in Siahkal County, Gilan province, Iran.

== Demographics ==
=== Population ===
At the time of the 2006 National Census, the village's population was 966 in 233 households. The following census in 2011 counted 972 people in 288 households. The 2016 census measured the population of the village as 967 people in 317 households. It was the most populous village in its rural district.
