= Halestan =

Halestan (Persian: هلستان) may refer to:

- Halestan, Gilan
- Halestan, Mazandaran
