= Dusatlat =

Village in Gilan province, Iran

Dusatlat Persian: دوست لات
- Village
- Location within Iran
- Coordinates: 37°06′47″N 49°44′21″E
- Country: Iran
- Province: Gilan
- County: Siahkal
- District: Central
- Rural District: Khara Rud

Population (2016)
  - Total: 514
- Time zone: UTC+3:30 (IRST)

Dusatlat (Persian: دوست لات) (Note: Also romanized as Dūsatlāt; also known as Doselāt, Dūzārāt, and Dūzelāt) is a village in Khara Rud Rural District of the Central District in Siahkal County, Gilan province, Iran.

== Demographics ==
=== Population ===
At the time of the 2006 National Census, the village's population was 547 in 140 households. The following census in 2011 counted 585 people in 171 households. The 2016 census measured the population of the village as 514 people in 163 households.
