= Kajil =

Village in Gilan province, Iran

Kajil Persian: كجيل
- Village
- Location within Iran
- Coordinates: 37°09′26″N 49°51′12″E
- Country: Iran
- Province: Gilan
- County: Siahkal
- District: Central
- Rural District: Khara Rud

Population (2016)
  - Total: 422
- Time zone: UTC+3:30 (IRST)

Kajil (Persian: كجيل) (Note: Also romanized as Kajīl) is a village in Khara Rud Rural District of the Central District in Siahkal County, Gilan province, Iran.

== Demographics ==
=== Population ===
At the time of the 2006 National Census, the village's population was 384 in 111 households. The following census in 2011 counted 390 people in 124 households. The 2016 census measured the population of the village as 422 people in 148 households.
