= Asu, Gilan =

Village in Gilan province, Iran

Asu Persian: اسو
- Village
- Location within Iran
- Coordinates: 37°03′32″N 49°52′31″E
- Country: Iran
- Province: Gilan
- County: Siahkal
- District: Central
- Rural District: Tutaki

Population (2016)
  - Total: 222
- Time zone: UTC+3:30 (IRST)

Asu (Persian: اسو) (Note: Also romanized as Āsū) is a village in Tutaki Rural District of the Central District in Siahkal County, Gilan province, Iran.

== Demographics ==
=== Population ===
At the time of the 2006 National Census, the village's population was 296 in 80 households. The following census in 2011 counted 275 people in 82 households. The 2016 census measured the population of the village as 222 people in 78 households.
