= Lashkarian =

Village in Gilan province, Iran

Lashkarian Persian: لشكريان
- Village
- Location within Iran
- Coordinates: 37°10′28″N 49°51′36″E
- Country: Iran
- Province: Gilan
- County: Siahkal
- District: Central
- Rural District: Malfejan

Population (2016)
  - Total: 339
- Time zone: UTC+3:30 (IRST)

Lashkarian (Persian: لشكريان) (Note: Also romanized as Lashkarīān; also known as Lashgarīān and Lashgariyān) is a village in Malfejan Rural District of the Central District in Siahkal County, Gilan province, Iran.

== Demographics ==
=== Population ===
At the time of the 2006 National Census, the village's population was 424 in 125 households. The following census in 2011 counted 349 people in 127 households. The 2016 census measured the population of the village as 339 people in 129 households.
