= Lish =

Village in Gilan province, Iran

Lish Persian: ليش
- Village
- Location within Iran
- Country: Iran
- Province: Gilan
- County: Siahkal
- District: Central
- Rural District: Tutaki

Population (2016)
  - Total: 751
- Time zone: UTC+3:30 (IRST)

Lish (Persian: ليش) (Note: Also romanized as Līsh) is a village in Tutaki Rural District of the Central District in Siahkal County, Gilan province, Iran.

== Demographics ==
=== Population ===
At the time of the 2006 National Census, the village's population was 417 in 116 households. The following census in 2011 counted 720 people in 220 households. The 2016 census measured the population of the village as 751 people in 248 households. It was the most populous village in its rural district.
