= Sowt Gavaber =

Village in Gilan province, Iran

Sowt Gavaber Persian: سوتگوابر
- Village
- Location within Iran
- Coordinates: 37°06′07″N 49°50′50″E
- Country: Iran
- Province: Gilan
- County: Siahkal
- District: Central
- Rural District: Tutaki

Population (2016)
  - Total: 187
- Time zone: UTC+3:30 (IRST)

Sowt Gavaber (Persian: سوتگوابر) (Note: Also romanized as Sootgavaber and Sowt Gavāber; also known as Sowt Kavāber and Sudgazer) is a village in Tutaki Rural District of the Central District in Siahkal County, Gilan province, Iran.

== Demographics ==
=== Population ===
At the time of the 2006 National Census, the village's population was 251 in 60 households. The following census in 2011 counted 210 people in 60 households. The 2016 census measured the population of the village as 187 people in 61 households.
