= Kala Gavabar =

Kala Gavabar (Persian: كلاگوابر), also known as Kalakavar, may refer to:

- Bala Kala Gavabar
- Pain Kala Gavabar
