= Angulvar =

Village in Gilan province, Iran

Angulvar Persian: انگولور
- Village
- Location within Iran
- Coordinates: 37°03′10″N 49°50′37″E
- Country: Iran
- Province: Gilan
- County: Siahkal
- District: Central
- Rural District: Tutaki

Population (2016)
  - Total: 120
- Time zone: UTC+3:30 (IRST)

Angulvar (Persian: انگولور) (Note: Also romanized as Angūlvar; also known as Angolbar) is a village in Tutaki Rural District of the Central District in Siahkal County, Gilan province, Iran.

== Demographics ==
=== Population ===
At the time of the 2006 National Census, the village's population was 126 in 34 households. The following census in 2011 counted 105 people in 28 households. The 2016 census measured the population of the village as 120 people in 40 households.
