= Deh Boneh, Siahkal =

Village in Gilan province, Iran

Deh Boneh Persian: دهبنه
- Village
- Location within Iran
- Country: Iran
- Province: Gilan
- County: Siahkal
- District: Central
- Rural District: Malfejan

Population (2016)
  - Total: 320
- Time zone: UTC+3:30 (IRST)

Deh Boneh (Persian: دهبنه) is a village in Malfejan Rural District of the Central District in Siahkal County, Gilan province, Iran.

== Demographics ==
=== Population ===
At the time of the 2006 National Census, the village's population was 353 in 109 households. The following census in 2011 counted 235 people in 89 households. The 2016 census measured the population of the village as 320 people in 117 households.
