= Tutaki =

Village in Gilan province, Iran

Tutaki Persian: توتكي
- Village
- Location within Iran
- Coordinates: 37°04′01″N 49°52′22″E
- Country: Iran
- Province: Gilan
- County: Siahkal
- District: Central
- Rural District: Tutaki

Population (2016)
  - Total: 71
- Time zone: UTC+3:30 (IRST)

Tutaki (Persian: توتكي) (Note: Also romanized as Tūtakī) is a village in, and the capital of, Tutaki Rural District in the Central District of Siahkal County, Gilan province, Iran.

== Demographics ==
=== Population ===
At the time of the 2006 National Census, the village's population was 110 in 30 households. The following census in 2011 counted 104 people in 32 households. The 2016 census measured the population of the village as 71 people in 25 households.
