= Lialehkal-e Bala =

Lialehkal-e Bala لياله كل بالا
- Village
- Location within Iran
- Coordinates: 37°04′52″N 49°53′57″E
- Country: Iran
- Province: Gilan
- County: Siahkal
- Bakhsh: Central
- Rural District: Tutaki

Population (2006)
  - Total: 18
- Time zone: UTC+3:30 (IRST)
  - Summer (DST): UTC+4:30 (IRDT)

Lialehkal-e Bala (Persian: لياله كل بالا, also Romanized as Līālehkal-e Bālā; also known as Līālekal) is a village in Tutaki Rural District, in the Central District of Siahkal County, Gilan Province, Iran. At the 2006 census, its population was 18, in 6 families.
