= Kajan, Gilan =

Kajan كاجان
- Village
- Location within Iran
- Coordinates: 37°08′39″N 49°51′27″E
- Country: Iran
- Province: Gilan
- County: Siahkal
- Bakhsh: Central
- Rural District: Khara Rud

Population (2006)
  - Total: 234
- Time zone: UTC+3:30 (IRST)
  - Summer (DST): UTC+4:30 (IRDT)

Kajan (Persian: كاجان, also Romanized as Kājān; also known as Kachan and Kadzhan) is a village in Khara Rud Rural District, in the Central District of Siahkal County, Gilan Province, Iran. At the 2006 census, its population was 234, in 74 families.
