= Kolamsar =

Village in Gilan province, Iran

Kolamsar Persian: كلامسر
- Village
- Location within Iran
- Coordinates: 37°08′45″N 49°50′53″E
- Country: Iran
- Province: Gilan
- County: Siahkal
- District: Central
- Rural District: Khara Rud

Population (2016)
  - Total: 362
- Time zone: UTC+3:30 (IRST)

Kolamsar (Persian: كلامسر) (Note: Also romanized as Kolām Sar and Kolāmsar; also known as Kalām Sarā, Kālehsān, and Keliser) is a village in Khara Rud Rural District of the Central District in Siahkal County, Gilan province, Iran.

== Demographics ==
=== Population ===
At the time of the 2006 National Census, the village's population was 436 in 132 households. The following census in 2011 counted 419 people in 133 households. The 2016 census measured the population of the village as 362 people in 139 households.
