= Lialehkal =

Lialehkal (Persian: لياله كل), also rendered as Lialekal may refer to:

- Lialehkal-e Bala
- Lialehkal-e Pain
