= Ezbaram =

Village in Gilan province, Iran

Ezbaram Persian: ازبرم
- Village
- Location within Iran
- Coordinates: 37°08′11″N 49°54′32″E
- Country: Iran
- Province: Gilan
- County: Siahkal
- District: Central
- Rural District: Malfejan

Population (2016)
  - Total: 504
- Time zone: UTC+3:30 (IRST)

Ezbaram (Persian: ازبرم) is a village in Malfejan Rural District of the Central District in Siahkal County, Gilan province, Iran.

== Demographics ==
=== Population ===
At the time of the 2006 National Census, the village's population was 416 in 131 households. The following census in 2011 counted 441 people in 147 households. The 2016 census measured the population of the village as 504 people in 176 households.
