= Khara Rud =

Village in Gilan province, Iran

Khara Rud Persian: خرارود
- Village
- Location within Iran
- Coordinates: 37°05′39″N 49°46′18″E
- Country: Iran
- Province: Gilan
- County: Siahkal
- District: Central
- Rural District: Khara Rud

Population (2016)
  - Total: 805
- Time zone: UTC+3:30 (IRST)

Khara Rud (Persian: خرارود) (Note: Also romanized as Khara Rood and Kharā Rūd; also known as Pā’īn Kharā Rūd, Pā’īn Kharārūd, and Salash-e Kharārūd) is a village in, and the capital of, Khara Rud Rural District in the Central District of Siahkal County, Gilan province, Iran.

== Demographics ==
=== Population ===
At the time of the 2006 National Census, the village's population was 861 in 223 households. The following census in 2011 counted 902 people in 266 households. The 2016 census measured the population of the village as 805 people in 273 households.
