= Siahkal Mahalleh, Malfejan =

Village in Gilan province, Iran

Siahkal Mahalleh Persian: سياهكل محله
- Village
- Location within Iran
- Coordinates: 37°10′00″N 49°53′01″E
- Country: Iran
- Province: Gilan
- County: Siahkal
- District: Central
- Rural District: Malfejan

Population (2016)
  - Total: 500
- Time zone: UTC+3:30 (IRST)

Siahkal Mahalleh (Persian: سياهكل محله) (Note: Also romanized as Sīāhkal Maḩalleh) is a village in Malfejan Rural District of the Central District in Siahkal County, Gilan province, Iran.

== Demographics ==
=== Population ===
At the time of the 2006 National Census, the village's population was 334 in 91 households. The following census in 2011 counted 434 people in 137 households. The 2016 census measured the population of the village as 500 people in 171 households.
