= Rudbar Sara =

Rudbar Sara (Persian: رودبارسرا) may refer to:

- Rudbar Sara, Rezvanshahr
- Rudbar Sara, Siahkal
- Rudbar Sara, Talesh
