= Korf Poshteh-ye Tazehabad =

Village in Gilan province, Iran

Korf Poshteh-ye Tazehabad Persian: كرف پشته تازه اباد
- Village
- Location within Iran
- Country: Iran
- Province: Gilan
- County: Siahkal
- District: Central
- Rural District: Tutaki

Population (2016)
  - Total: 374
- Time zone: UTC+3:30 (IRST)

Korf Poshteh-ye Tazehabad (Persian: كرف پشته تازه اباد) (Note: Also romanized as Korf Poshteh-ye Tāzehābād; also known as Karaf Poshteh and Karpushte) is a village in Tutaki Rural District of the Central District in Siahkal County, Gilan province, Iran.

== Demographics ==
=== Population ===
At the time of the 2006 National Census, the village's population was 192 in 48 households. The following census in 2011 counted 369 people in 107 households. The 2016 census measured the population of the village as 374 people in 115 households.
