= Ashk-e Majan Pahlu =

Village in Gilan province, Iran

Ashk-e Majan Pahlu Persian: اشكمجان پهلو
- Village
- Location within Iran
- Coordinates: 37°07′04″N 49°51′26″E
- Country: Iran
- Province: Gilan
- County: Siahkal
- District: Central
- Rural District: Tutaki

Population (2016)
  - Total: 245
- Time zone: UTC+3:30 (IRST)

Ashk-e Majan Pahlu (Persian: اشكمجان پهلو) (Note: Also romanized as Ashk-e Mahān Pahlū; also known as Ashk-e Jahān Pahlū) is a village in Tutaki Rural District of the Central District in Siahkal County, Gilan province, Iran.

== Demographics ==
=== Population ===
At the time of the 2006 National Census, the village's population was 310 in 81 households. The following census in 2011 counted 272 people in 80 households. The 2016 census measured the population of the village as 245 people in 79 households.
