= Korf Poshteh-ye Galeshi =

Village in Gilan province, Iran

Korf Poshteh-ye Galeshi Persian: كرف پشته گالشي
- Village
- Location within Iran
- Coordinates: 37°08′41″N 49°51′23″E
- Country: Iran
- Province: Gilan
- County: Siahkal
- District: Central
- Rural District: Tutaki

Population (2016)
  - Total: 278
- Time zone: UTC+3:30 (IRST)

Korf Poshteh-ye Galeshi (Persian: كرف پشته گالشي) (Note: Also romanized as Korf Poshteh-ye Gāleshī; also known as Karaf Poshteh) is a village in Tutaki Rural District of the Central District in Siahkal County, Gilan province, Iran.

== Demographics ==
=== Population ===
At the time of the 2006 National Census, the village's population was 178 in 45 households. The following census in 2011 counted 254 people in 73 households. The 2016 census measured the population of the village as 278 people in 86 households.
