= Pain Kala Gavabar =

Pain Kala Gavabar پائين كلاگوابر
- Village
- Location within Iran
- Coordinates: 37°06′49″N 49°53′25″E
- Country: Iran
- Province: Gilan
- County: Siahkal
- Bakhsh: Central
- Rural District: Malfejan

Population (2006)
  - Total: 100
- Time zone: UTC+3:30 (IRST)

Pain Kala Gavabar (Persian: پائين كلاگوابر, also Romanized as Pā’īn Kalā Gavābar; also known as Kalākāvar-e Pā’īn) is a village in Malfejan Rural District, in the Central District of Siahkal County, Gilan Province, Iran. At the 2016 census, its population was 59, in 19 families. Down from 100 people in 2006.
