= Kachan =

Kachan may refer to:

== Places ==
=== Iran ===
- Kashan
- Kachan, Astaneh-ye Ashrafiyeh
- Kachan, Siahkal

=== Nepal ===
- Kachan, Nepal

== People with the surname ==
- Arina Kachan (born 1994), Belarusian judoka
