= Panabandan =

Village in Gilan province, Iran

Panabandan Persian: پنابندان
- Village
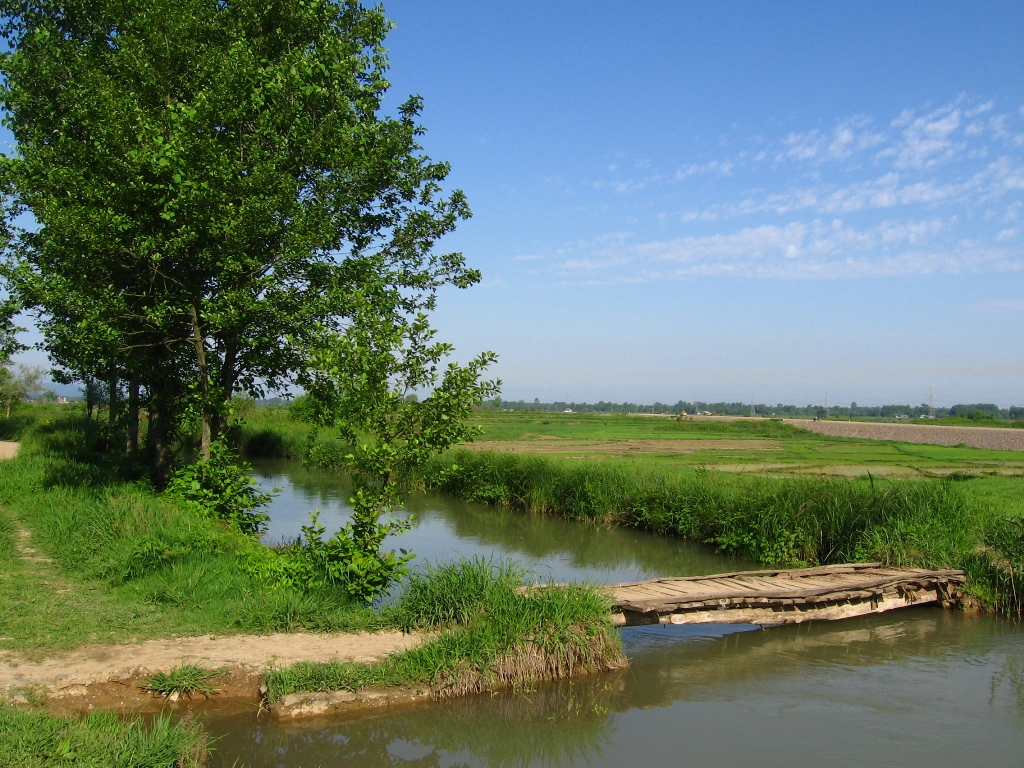
- Badan Mahalleh, near Panabandan

- Location within Iran
- Coordinates: 37°08′30″N 49°46′02″E
- Country: Iran
- Province: Gilan
- County: Siahkal
- District: Central
- Rural District: Khara Rud

Population (2016)
  - Total: 343
- Time zone: UTC+3:30 (IRST)

Panabandan (Persian: پنابندان) (Note: Also romanized as Panābandān; also known as Panāh, Panāh Bandān, Panāmandān, and Panāvandān) is a village in Khara Rud Rural District of the Central District in Siahkal County, Gilan province, Iran.

== Demographics ==
=== Population ===
At the time of the 2006 National Census, the village's population was 409 in 124 households. The following census in 2011 counted 375 people in 124 households. The 2016 census measured the population of the village as 343 people in 126 households.
