= Mehraban, Gilan =

Village in Gilan province, Iran

Mehraban Persian: مهربن
- Village
- Location within Iran
- Coordinates: 37°07′40″N 49°51′54″E
- Country: Iran
- Province: Gilan
- County: Siahkal
- District: Central
- Rural District: Tutaki

Population (2016)
  - Total: 289
- Time zone: UTC+3:30 (IRST)

Mehraban (Persian: مهربن) (Note: Also known as Mehrbun) is a village in Tutaki Rural District of the Central District in Siahkal County, Gilan province, Iran.

== Demographics ==
=== Population ===
At the time of the 2006 National Census, the village's population was 315 in 83 households. The following census in 2011 counted 350 people in 105 households. The 2016 census measured the population of the village as 289 people in 101 households.
