= Panah =

Panah may refer to:

- Panah, Afghanistan
- Panah, Iran (disambiguation)

== See also ==
- Panaah (disambiguation)
