= Halestan, Gilan =

Village in Gilan province, Iran

Halestan Persian: هلستان
- Village
- Location within Iran
- Coordinates: 37°09′16″N 49°53′09″E
- Country: Iran
- Province: Gilan
- County: Siahkal
- District: Central
- Rural District: Malfejan

Population (2016)
  - Total: 300
- Time zone: UTC+3:30 (IRST)

Halestan (Persian: هلستان) (Note: Also romanized as Halestān; also known as Halvestān) is a village in Malfejan Rural District of the Central District in Siahkal County, Gilan province, Iran.

== Demographics ==
=== Population ===
At the time of the 2006 National Census, the village's population was 299 in 75 households. The following census in 2011 counted 349 people in 107 households. The 2016 census measured the population of the village as 300 people in 102 households.
