= Khararud Rural District =

Khararud Rural District or Khara Rud Rural District (Persian: دهستان خرارود) may refer to:

- Khara Rud Rural District (Siahkal County), Gilan province
- Khararud Rural District (Khodabandeh County), Zanjan province
