= Su Sara =

Su Sara (Persian: سوسرا) may refer to:

- Su Sara, Gilan
- Su Sara, Golestan
