= Gerdkuh (disambiguation) =

Gerdkuh is a Nizari Ismaili fortress in present-day Semnan Province, Iran.

Gerdkuh or Gerd-e Kuh (Persian: گردکوه) may refer to:

- Gerd-e Kuh, Lahijan
- Gerdkuh, Siahkal
