= Nipsey =

Nipsey is a nickname. Notable people with the nickname include:

- Nipsey Hussle (1985–2019), American rapper
- Nipsey Russell (1918–2005), American actor, comedian, poet, and dancer

== See also ==
- Nipsy, or knurr and spell, English game
- Nispey, village in Iran
