= Panaah =

Panaah (lit. 'refuge') may refer to:

- Panaah (TV series), an Indian TV series aired on DD National
- Panaah (film), an Indian film released in 1992

== See also ==
- Panah (disambiguation)
