= Panah, Iran =

Panah (Persian: پناه) in Iran may refer to:

- Panah, Gilan
- Panah, Razavi Khorasan
