= Katnaghbyur, Aragatsotn =

Katnaghbyur Կաթնաղբյուր
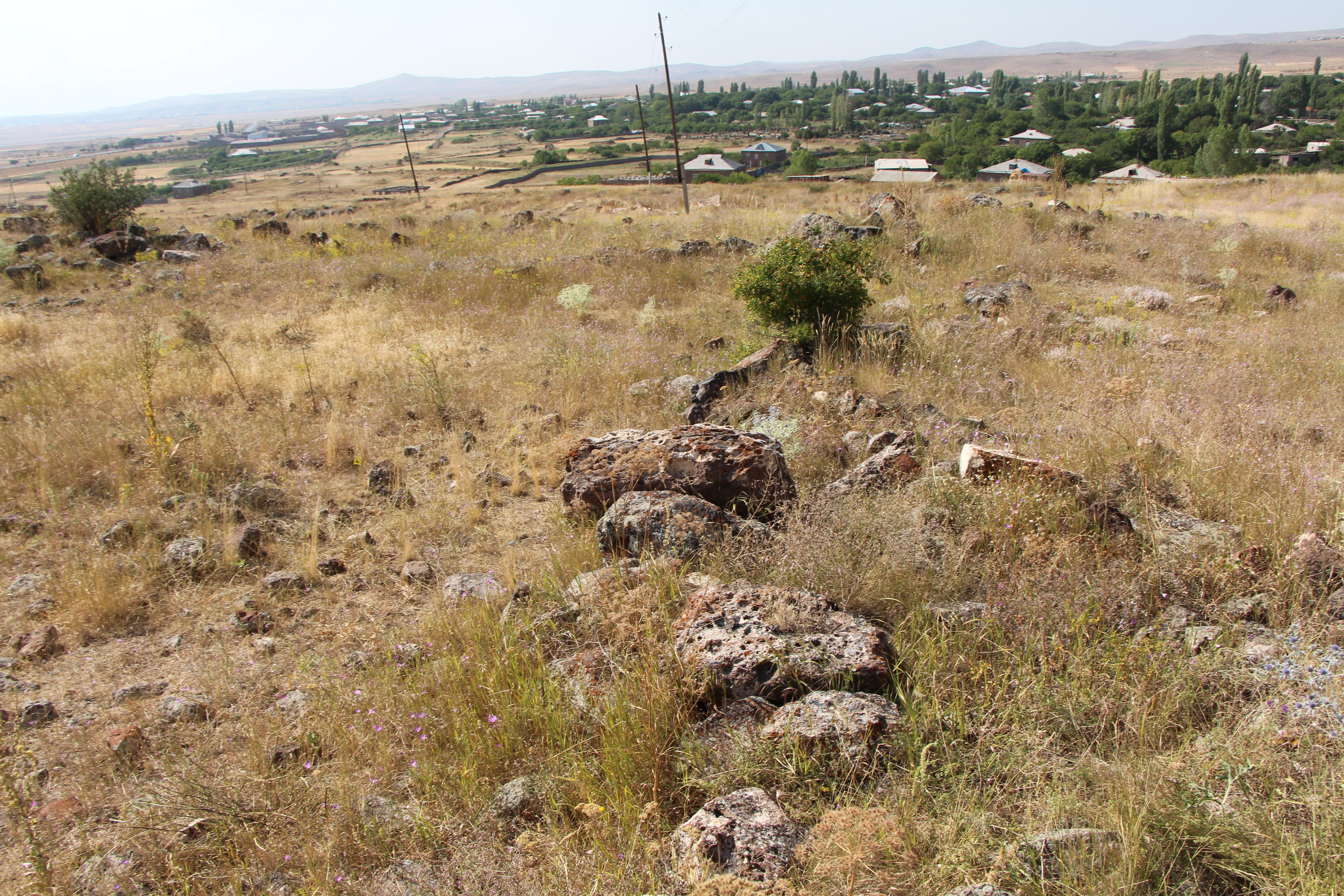
- Կաթնաղբյուր ԴԱՄԲԱՐԱՆԱԴԱՇՏ4-7

- Location within Armenia Location within Aragatsotn
- Coordinates: 40°22′38″N 43°56′18″E
- Country: Armenia
- Province: Aragatsotn
- Municipality: Talin

Population (2011)
  - Total: 1,274
- Time zone: UTC+4
  - Summer (DST): UTC+5

Katnaghbyur (Armenian: Կաթնաղբյուր) is a village in the Talin Municipality of the Aragatsotn Province of Armenia. The village has the ruins of a 5th-century church.
