= Mehraban, Lorestan =

Mehraban مهربان
- Village
- Location within Iran
- Coordinates: 33°09′36″N 48°46′31″E
- Country: Iran
- Province: Lorestan
- County: Khorramabad
- Bakhsh: Papi
- Rural District: Chamsangar

Population (2006)
  - Total: 36
- Time zone: UTC+3:30 (IRST)
  - Summer (DST): UTC+4:30 (IRDT)

Mehraban (Persian: مهربان, also romanized as Mehrabān) is a village in Chamsangar Rural District, Papi District, Khorramabad County, Lorestan Province, Iran. At the 2006 census, its population was 36, in 6 families.
