= Halestan, Mazandaran =

Halestan هلستان
- Neighbourhood
- Location within Iran
- Coordinates: 36°39′02″N 51°27′33″E
- Country: Iran
- Province: Mazandaran
- County: Nowshahr
- Bakhsh: Central
- City: Nowshahr

Population (2011)
  - Total: 1,468
- Time zone: UTC+3:30 (IRST)

Halestan (Persian: هلستان, also Romanized as Halestān; also known as Halīstān) is a neighborhood in the city of Nowshahr in Mazandaran Province, Iran. It is west of the city center and east of Chalus city.

It was formerly a village in Kheyrud Kenar Rural District, in the Central District of Nowshahr County.

At the time of the 2006 National Census, the village's population was 1,512 in 402 households. The following census in 2011 counted 1,468 people in 448 households.
