= Rudbar Sara, Talesh =

Rudbar Sara رودبارسرا
- Village
- Location within Iran
- Coordinates: 38°11′06″N 48°52′31″E
- Country: Iran
- Province: Gilan
- County: Talesh
- Bakhsh: Haviq
- Rural District: Chubar

Population (2006)
  - Total: 128
- Time zone: UTC+3:30 (IRST)
  - Summer (DST): UTC+4:30 (IRDT)

Rudbar Sara or Rudbarsara (Persian: رودبارسرا, also Romanized as Rūdbār Sarā; also known as Rūd Sarā and Rūdsarā-ye Chūbar) is a village in Chubar Rural District, Haviq District, Talesh County, Gilan Province, Iran. At the 2006 census, its population was 128, in 34 families.
