= Khara Rud Rural District (Siahkal County) =

Rural district in Gilan province, Iran

Khara Rud Rural District Persian: دهستان خرارود
- Rural District
- Location within Iran
- Coordinates: 37°04′N 49°47′E
- Country: Iran
- Province: Gilan
- County: Siahkal
- District: Central
- Established: 1987
- Capital: Khara Rud

Population (2016)
  - Total: 6,723
- Time zone: UTC+3:30 (IRST)

Khara Rud Rural District (Persian: دهستان خرارود) is in the Central District of Siahkal County, Gilan province, Iran. Its capital is the village of Khara Rud.

== Demographics ==
=== Population ===
At the time of the 2006 National Census, the rural district's population was 7,899 in 2,054 households. There were 7,327 inhabitants in 2,268 households at the following census of 2011. The 2016 census measured the population of the rural district as 6,723 in 2,308 households. The most populous of its 40 villages was Tazehabad-e Jankah, with 967 people.

=== Other villages in the rural district ===
- Chaleshom
- Dusatlat
- Fashtal
- Kajil
- Kolamsar
- Malek Rud
- Panabandan
