= Malfejan Rural District =

Rural district in Gilan province, Iran

Malfejan Rural District Persian: دهستان مالفجان
- Rural District
- Location within Iran
- Coordinates: 37°09′N 49°54′E
- Country: Iran
- Province: Gilan
- County: Siahkal
- District: Central
- Established: 1987
- Capital: Malfejan

Population (2016)
  - Total: 5,839
- Time zone: UTC+3:30 (IRST)

Malfejan Rural District (Persian: دهستان مالفجان) is in the Central District of Siahkal County, Gilan province, Iran. Its capital is the village of Malfejan.

== Demographics ==
=== Population ===
At the time of the 2006 National Census, the rural district's population was 6,390 in 1,893 households. There were 6,139 inhabitants in 2,008 households at the following census of 2011. The 2016 census measured the population of the rural district as 5,839 in 2,119 households. The most populous of its 38 villages was Malfejan, with 855 people.

=== Other villages in the rural district ===
- Deh Boneh
- Ezbaram
- Halestan
- Lashkarian
- Namak Rudbar
- Siahkal Mahalleh
