= Tutaki Rural District =

Rural district in Gilan province, Iran

Tutaki Rural District Persian: دهستان توتكي
- Rural District
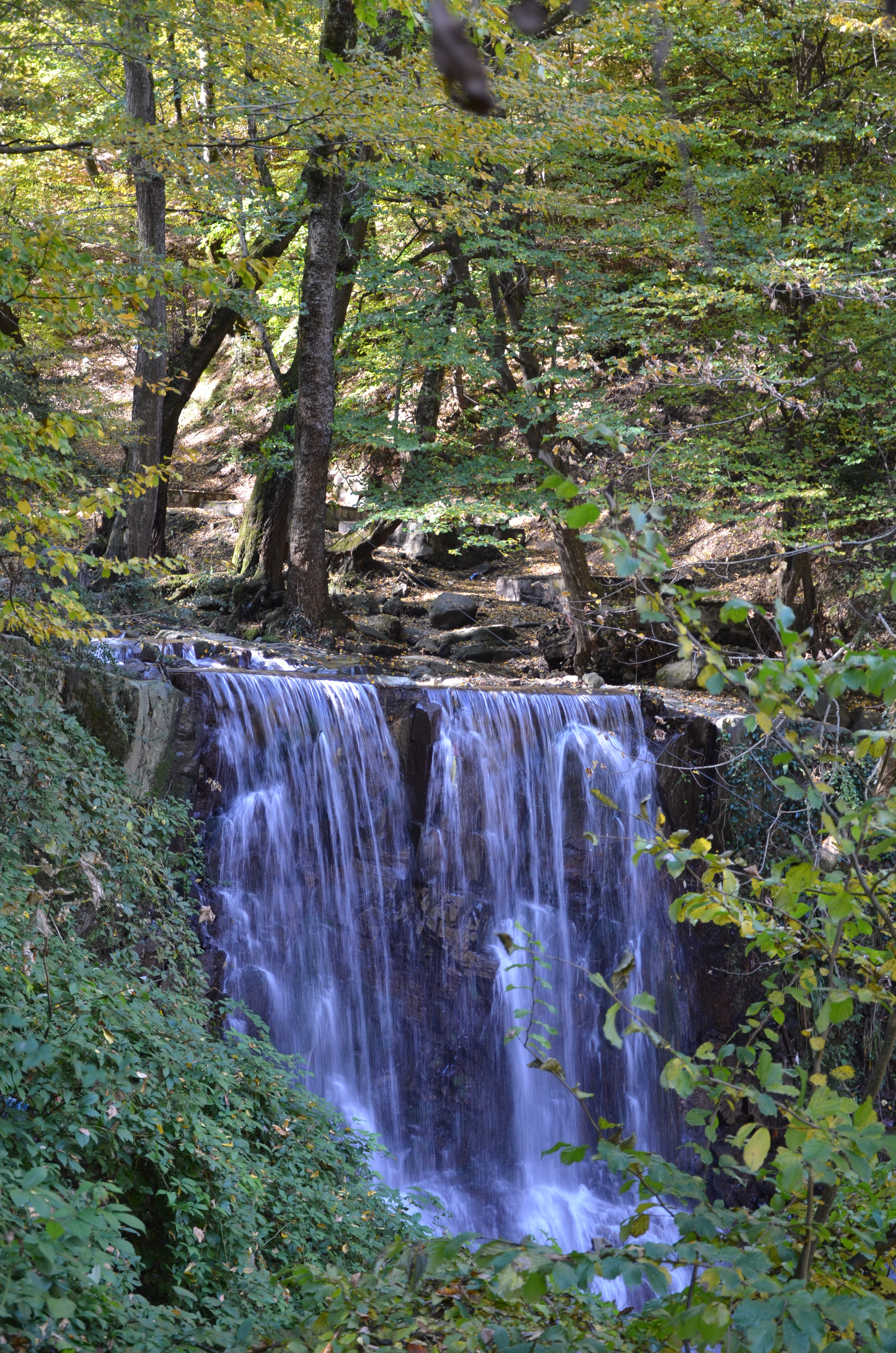
- Lunak Waterfall, Tutaki RD

- Location within Iran
- Coordinates: 37°03′N 49°55′E
- Country: Iran
- Province: Gilan
- County: Siahkal
- District: Central
- Established: 1987
- Capital: Tutaki

Population (2016)
  - Total: 3,891
- Time zone: UTC+3:30 (IRST)

Tutaki Rural District (Persian: دهستان توتكي) is in the Central District of Siahkal County, Gilan province, Iran. Its capital is the village of Tutaki.

== Demographics ==
=== Population ===
At the time of the 2006 National Census, the rural district's population was 4,707 in 1,256 households. There were 4,276 inhabitants in 1,310 households at the following census of 2011. The 2016 census measured the population of the rural district as 3,891 in 1,323 households. The most populous of its 67 villages was Lish, with 751 people.

=== Other villages in the rural district ===
- Angulvar
- Ashk-e Majan Pahlu
- Asu
- Korf Poshteh-ye Galeshi
- Korf Poshteh-ye Tazehabad
- Mehraban
- Sowt Gavaber
- Tushi
