= Siahkal County =

County in Gilan province, Iran

Siahkal County Persian: شهرستان سیاهکل
- County
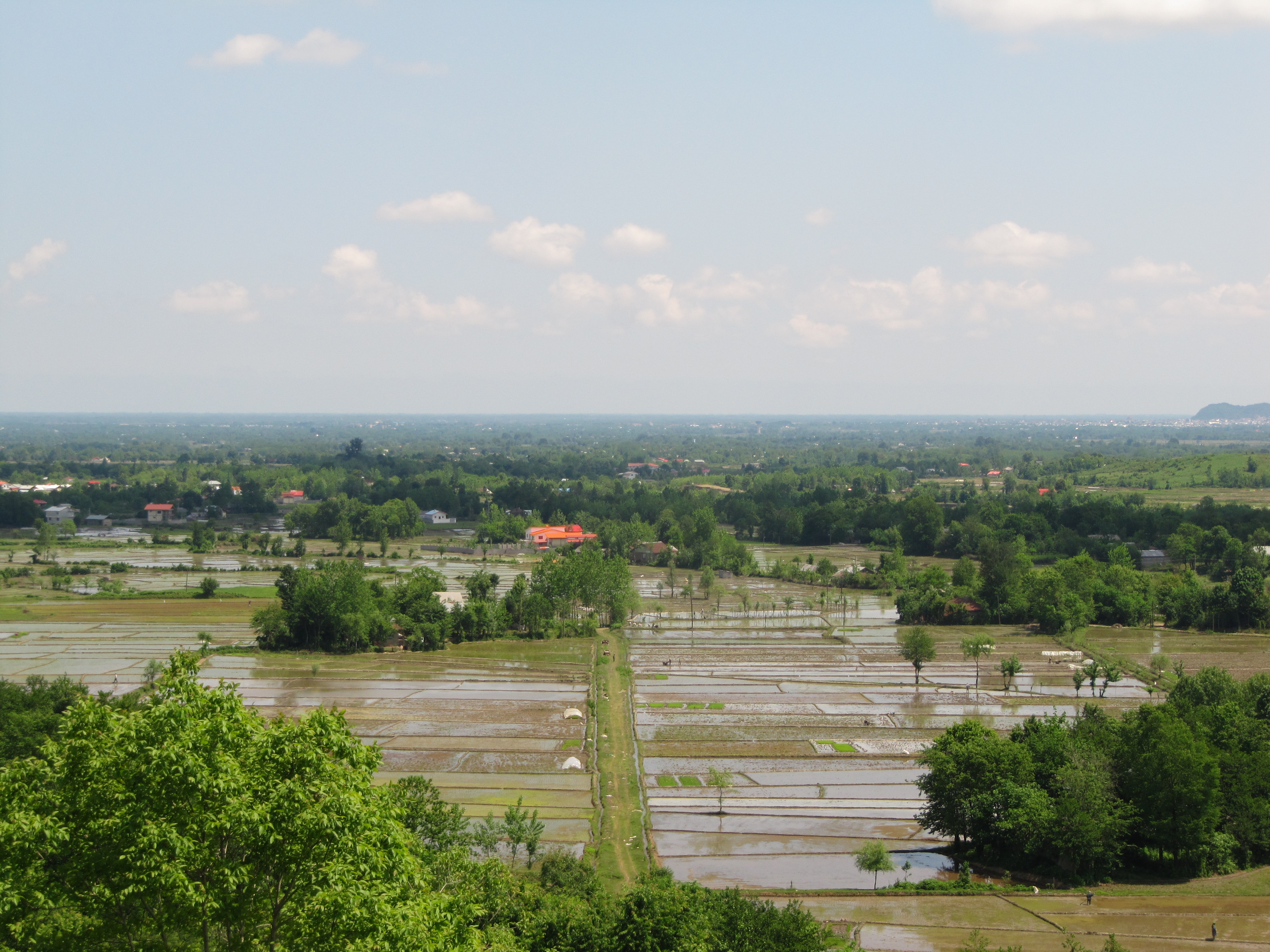

- Location of Siahkal County in Gilan province (bottom, green)

- Location of Gilan province in Iran
- Coordinates: 36°55′N 49°59′E
- Country: Iran
- Province: Gilan
- Established: 1997
- Capital: Siahkal
- Districts: Central, Deylaman

Population (2016)
  - Total: 46,975
- Time zone: UTC+3:30 (IRST)

Siahkal County (Persian: شهرستان سیاهکل) is in Gilan province, Iran. Its capital is the city of Siahkal.

== Demographics ==
=== Population ===
At the time of the 2006 National Census, the county's population was 46,991 in 13,196 households. The following census in 2011 counted 47,096 people in 14,933 households. The 2016 census measured the population of the county as 46,975 in 16,351 households.

=== Administrative divisions ===
Siahkal County's population history and administrative structure over three consecutive censuses are shown in the following table.

Siahkal County Population
Administrative Divisions	2006	2011	2016
Central District	34,270	35,918	36,377
Khara Rud RD	7,899	7,327	6,723
Malfejan RD	6,390	6,139	5,839
Tutaki RD	4,707	4,276	3,891
Siahkal (city)	15,274	18,176	19,924
Deylaman District	12,721	11,178	10,597
Deylaman RD	6,827	5,543	5,270
Pir Kuh RD	4,633	3,979	3,598
Deylaman (city)	1,261	1,656	1,729
Total	46,991	47,096	46,975
RD = Rural District

== See also ==
Media related to Siahkal County at Wikimedia Commons
