= Central District (Siahkal County) =

District in Gilan province, Iran

Central District (Siahkal County) Persian: بخش مرکزی شهرستان سیاهکل
- District
- Location within Iran
- Coordinates: 37°04′N 49°52′E
- Country: Iran
- Province: Gilan
- County: Siahkal
- Established: 1997
- Capital: Siahkal

Population (2016)
  - Total: 36,377
- Time zone: UTC+3:30 (IRST)

The Central District of Siahkal County (Persian: بخش مرکزی شهرستان سیاهکل) is in Gilan province, Iran. Its capital is the city of Siahkal.

== Demographics ==
=== Population ===
At the time of the 2006 National Census, the district's population was 34,270 in 9,546 households. The following census in 2011 counted 35,918 people in 11,231 households. The 2016 census measured the population of the district as 36,377 inhabitants in 12,546 households.

=== Administrative divisions ===
Central District (Siahkal County) Population
| Administrative Divisions | 2006 | 2011 | 2016 |
|---|---|---|---|
| Khara Rud RD | 7,899 | 7,327 | 6,723 |
| Malfejan RD | 6,390 | 6,139 | 5,839 |
| Tutaki RD | 4,707 | 4,276 | 3,891 |
| Siahkal (city) | 15,274 | 18,176 | 19,924 |
| Total | 34,270 | 35,918 | 36,377 |
RD = Rural District
