= Kurka =

Kurka may refer to:

- Kurka, Iran, a neighborhood of the city of Astaneh-ye Ashrafiyeh
- Kurka Rural District, an administrative division of Iran
- Kurka (surname), a Czech surname
- Kůrka, a Czech surname
