= Hassan Ali Nokhodaki Isfahani =

Iranian mystic (1863–1942)

Hassan Ali Nukhudaki Isfahani
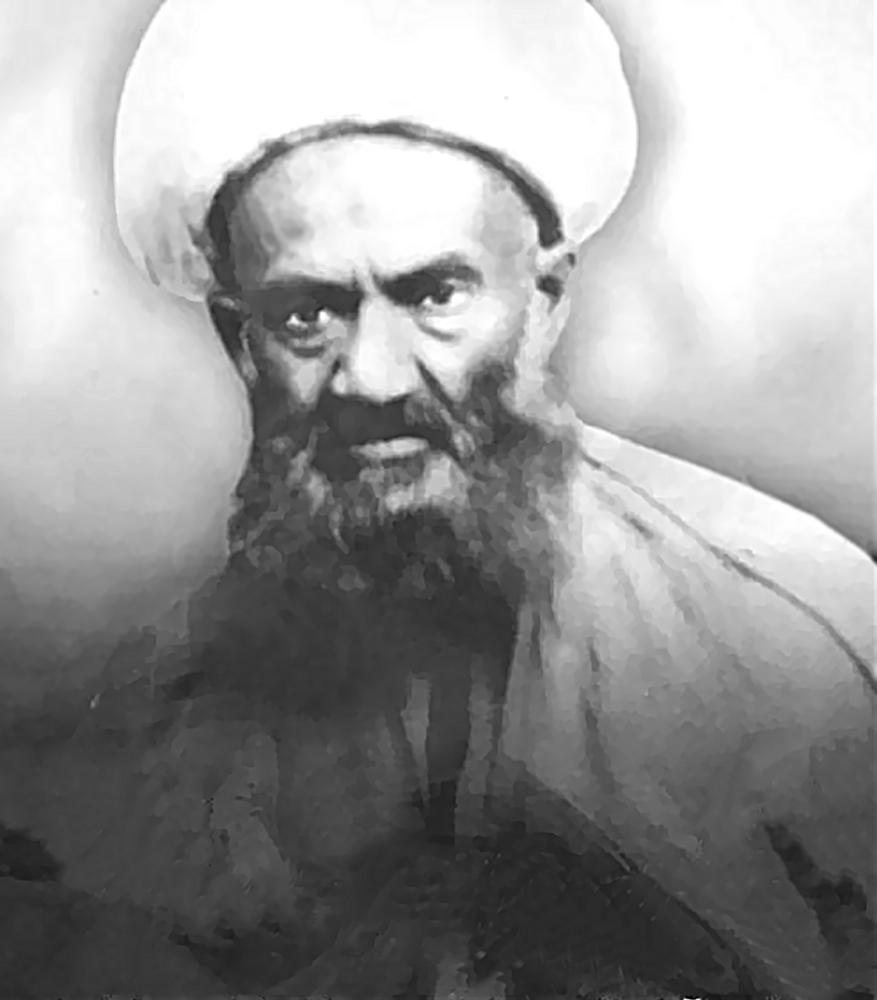
- Born: 4 May 1863; Isfahan, Sublime State of Iran
- Died: 29 August 1942 (aged 79); Mashhad, Imperial State of Iran
- Occupations: Jurist, Moralist, mystic, Shi'ite cleric

Hasan Ali Nukhudaki Isfahani (Persian: حسنعلی نخودکی اصفهانی; 4 May 1863 – 29 August 1942) was an Shi'a Muslim scholar and Sufi mystic who practiced asceticism. He also studied astronomy and mathematics.

== Early life ==
Nakhodaki was born Hasan Ali Miqdadi in Isfahan on 4 May 1863. Hasan Ali's father, Ali Akbar, was a shopkeeper in Isfahan and a follower of Muhammad Sadiq Takht Puladi, a leader of the Chishti Order. His father died in 1873. When he grew up, Hasan Ali went to Shahreza, about 80 km southwest of Isfahan, to study under Sayyid Ja'far Husayni Qazwini.

== Education ==
In addition to self-purification, Sheikh Hasan Ali began studying Islamic sciences. He studied Arabic literature, logic, philosophy, jurisprudence, principles of jurisprudence and mathematics under renowned teachers of the Isfahan Seminary such as Jahangir Khan Qashqa'i and Akhund Mulla Muhammad Kashi. Hasan Ali studied tafsir (exegesis of the Qur'an) under Sayyid Sina, son of Sayyid Ja'far Kashfi.

He went to Mashhad in 1886 and stayed there for a year, practicing asceticism in one of the rooms on the upper floor of the Atiq courtyard in the holy shrine of Imam al-Rida. He returned to Isfahan the following year, and then went to the seminary at Najaf. He stayed there until 1894, completed his studies under the tutelage of Mirza Habib Allah Rashti, Sayyid Muhammad Fisharaki Isfahani, Sayyid Muhammad Kazim Tabataba'i Yazdi, Mohammad Hasan Mamaqani and Mulla Isma'ili Qarahbaghi.

While at Najaf, he visited the scholar and mystic Sayyid Murtadha Kashmiri.

In 1894, Hasan Ali traveled to Mashhad, practicing asceticism and became a student of Muhammad Ali Khurasani (known as Haji Fadil), Sayyid Ali Hariri Yazdi, Haj Agha Hussain Qumi, and 'Abd al-Rahman Mudarris. He left Mashhad in 1897 to Shiraz, learning medicine and studying Avicenna's law under Mirza Ja'far Tabib. In Ramadan of the same year, Hasan Ali went to Bushehr and from there, he went to Mecca.

Hasan Ali returned to Mashhad in 1911 and stayed there until his death. He was given the title "Nokhodaki" in his old age, living near Mashhad.

== Teaching ==
Sheikh Nokhodaki spent most of his time in worship, ascesis, and i'tikaf, visiting the graves of mystics such as Abu Ali Farmadi, Shaykh Muhammad Karandighi (known as Pir Palanduz), and Shaykh Muhammad Mu'min.

Although being occupied with worship and prayer most of the time, he sometimes taught jurisprudence, the principles of jurisprudence, and mathematics in books such as Sharh al-lum'a al-Dimashqiyya, Ma'alim al-din and Khulasat al-hisab.

The major points of his spiritual instructions to his pupils were:

1. Great observation of religious rulings
2. Halal food
3. Observing obligatory daily prayers on time
4. Striving in achievement of the presence of heart

He also greatly advised on keeping vigil, watchfulness of the actions and the soul during the day and self-accounting at nights.

According to some of Nakhodaki's letters to his pupils, he believed that there was no accomplished mystic and teacher who could help the wayfarers at his time. Moreover, he frequently mentioned that he was not perfect, and he could not be a murshid (guide) and therefore, it was due to the need and no other choices that he gave some instructions, he received from a perfect man he had seen, to the seekers and those who insisted on receiving them, and he advised them to observe those instructions constantly until they visit a perfect mystic.

He also regarded tasawwuf as the way of reaching God and thus believed that it is not exclusive to Islam and it exists in all religions and in the instructions of all the prophets (a) and friends of God, but its perfect form has emerged in Islam with Irfan.

Moreover, he regarded the appearance of tasawwuf as the rulings in Islam and considered connection with wilayah, i.e. believing in the wilayah of Imam Ali (a) and his successors (a) as the heart of Islam. Therefore, in his opinion, Qutb was one whose chain of permission for instruction was linked with Imam Ali (as) and his infallible progeny (as) so that he could guide others and one who is not connected with wilayah, even though his actions are in agreement with religion, but he has no connection with true Islam and tasawwuf.

Hasan Ali was knowledgeable about occult sciences (al-'ulum al-ghariba) and had a number of pupils. He was also knowledgeable about alchemy.

Among Nakhodaki's pupils and disciples were,

- His son, Ali Miqdadi Isfahani,
- His grandson, Sayed Hujjat Hashemi Khorasani,
- Abd al-Nabi Khurasani,
- Dhabih Allah Amir Shahidi,
- Muhammad Hasan Khurasani,
- Mahmud Halabi,
- Muhammad Ahmadabadi (known as Tabib zadih),
- Sayyid Ali Radawi,
- and Abu l-Hasan Hafezian.

Al-Sayyid Shahab, al-Din al-Mariachi, al-Najafi, and Ghulam Rida 'Irfanian Yazdi, were also his students in hadith studies and were among those who received permission from him for narrating hadiths.

== Death ==
Nokhodaki died on 17 Sha'ban 1361(Islamic calendar) or 30 August 1942. Many of the people of Mashhad attended his funeral and he was buried in 'Atiq courtyard of the holy Shrine of Imam al-Rida (a).

== Works ==
Nakhodaki's works were compiled by his son in a book called Nishan az bi Nishanha in two volumes which includes a gloss on Shaykh Buhari Hamedani's Tadhkirat al-Muttaqin, some letters to some disciples, scripts of some of his meetings, treatises mostly on mystical and moral topics such as Tawhid, Wilaya, love of the Ahl al-Bayt (a), love, piety and ascesis, Muslims' mutual right towards each other, du'a, and the conditions for accepting it and sincerity.

Nokhodaki's corrected Irshad al-Bayan and Attar Neyshabur Asrar Nameh and published them in 1355/1936 and 1356/1937 in Tehran. He also published Mulla Muhsin Fayd Kashani Tarjimat al-salat together with some ideas of his own on prayer.

He also sometimes composed poems.

== See also ==
- Ali Tabatabaei
- Ja’far Mojtahedi
- Abbas Quchani
