= Zaynolabideen Ghorbani =

Iranian Ayatollah (1933–2026)

Ayatollah Sheikh Zaynolabideen Ghorbani
- زین‌العابدین قربانی
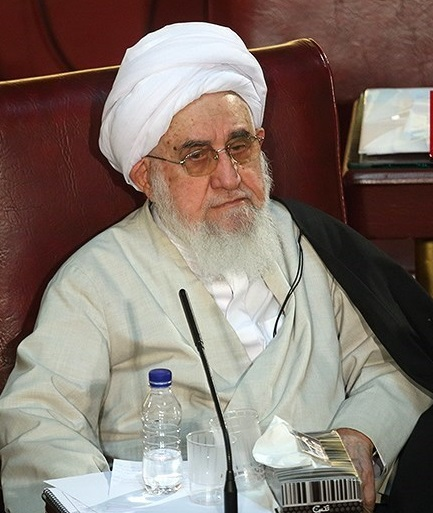
- Ayatollah Ghorbani during the Closing Ceremony of the 17th Meeting of the Assembly of Experts in the Fourth term.

Representative of the Supreme Leader
- In office 16 July 1979 – 3 April 2018
- Appointed by: Ruhollah Khomeini
- Preceded by: Office Created
- Succeeded by: Rasool Falahati
- Constituency: Gilan Province

Friday Prayer Leader in Lahijan
- In office 5 November 1979 – 8 July 2001
- Appointed by: Ruhollah Khomeini
- Preceded by: Office Created
- Constituency: Gilan

Member of the Second Term of the Islamic Consultative Assembly.
- In office 15 April 1984 – 8 April 1988
- Constituency: (Astaneh-ye Ashrafiyeh) - Gilan Province
- Majority: 23,118 Votes (62.70%)

Friday Prayer Leader in Rasht
- In office 8 July 2001 – 3 April 2018
- Appointed by: Ali Khamenei
- Preceded by: Sadeq Ehsanbakhsh
- Succeeded by: Rasool Falahati
- Constituency: Gilan

Member of the Second, Third, Fourth, and Fifth terms of the Assembly of Experts.
- In office 8 October 1990 – 21 May 2024
- Preceded by: Sadeq Ehsanbakhsh
- Constituency: Gilan Province
- آیت الله شیخ زین‌العابدین قربانی
- Title: Ayatollah

Personal life
- Born: 8 January 1933 Panchah, Persia
- Died: 12 October 2026 (aged 93) Lahijan, Iran
- Parent: Gholam Hassan Ghorbani (father)
- Education: Qom Hawza

Religious life
- Religion: Islam
- Founder of: Islamic Azad University, Lahijan Branch
- Jurisprudence: Twelver Shia Islam

Sheikh Zaynolabideen Ghorbani (Persian: شیخ زین‌العابدین قربانی; 8 January 1933 – 12 October 2026) was an Iranian Ayatollah. He represented the Supreme Leader of Iran for Gilan Province, as well as leading prayers in Lahijan and Rasht. He represented the people in Gilan for both the Assembly of Experts (from 1990 to 2024), and Islamic Consultative Assembly (from 1984 to 1988).

== Background ==
Ghorbani was born in a village called Panchah, Gilan province, on 8 January 1933. He lost his father, Gholam Hassan, at the age of 5. They were a family involved in agriculture, and Ghorbani would help his family with farm work as well as attending school. He had 10 children, 7 sons and 3 daughters. Mohammad Hossein Ghorbani is also his nephew, who is a representative of Astaneh-ye Ashrafiyeh in the Islamic Consultative Assembly.

He attended his primary school in his hometown, where he learnt the basics of the Quran, as well as learning Persian. He then travelled to Lahijan to attend Islamic lessons there as well as learning Arabic. In 1950, he went to Qom to attend the Qom Seminary. While in Qom, he took classes taught by many esteemed Shia scholars. He took classes in Islamic jurisprudence and Principles of Islamic jurisprudence with Hossein Borujerdi and Ruhollah Khomeini, as well as Islamic philosophy with Muhammad Husayn Tabatabai. He reached Ijtihad after finishing his advanced Islamic lessons (Darse Kharej).

Ghorbani died in Lahijan on 12 October 2026, at the age of 93.

== Teachers ==
Some of the teachers Zaynolabideen Ghorbani had during his lifetime including:

- Hossein Borujerdi
- Ruhollah Khomeini
- Muhammad Husayn Tabatabai
- Mohsen Jahangiri (Philosopher)
- Shikeh Mohammad Taghi Sotoudeh
- Musa al-Sadr
- Hossein Noori Hamedani
- Seyed Reza Sadr
- Hussein-Ali Montazeri
- Ali Meshkini
- Mohammad-Taqi Bahjat Foumani
- Mirza Mohammad Mojahedi Tabrizi
- Seyed Mohammad Baqer Soltani
- Mohammad-Reza Golpaygani
- Mirza Hashem Amoli
- Sheikh Abbas Ali Shahroudi

== Political activity ==
=== Before the revolution ===
Before the 1979 Iranian revolution, Ghorbani became acquainted with Navvab Safavi and joined the Fada'iyan-e Islam in 1952 while in Qom. After the execution of Safavi, Ghorbani went into hiding for some time. While in hiding, he also became acquainted with Ali Khamenei. As time went by, he became more vocal against the Shah, and was arrested by SAVAK in 1963. After the departure of Mohammad Beheshti to Germany in 1965, Ghorbani was re-arrested after engaging in activities related to Behehsti. He was arrested again in 1971 for 6 months for continuously making anti-Shah speeches, he was banned from leaving the country or engaging in Islamic affairs.

=== After the revolution ===
After the removal of Mohammad Reza Pahlavi, Ghorbani was appointed by Ruhollah Khomeini to represent the Supreme Leader of Iran in Gilan Province, as well as being the Imam of Friday Prayer in Lahijan. He also represented the people in Gilan for the Iranian Parliament from 1984 to 1988, as well as representing them in the Assembly of Experts from 1990 to 2024. After the death of Sadeq Ehsanbakhsh, Ghorbani was appointed by Ali Khamenei to be the Imam of Friday Prayer in Rasht. In 2018, Ghorbani resigned as representative of the Supreme Leader, as well as the Friday Prayer leader in Rasht, after the controversy surrounding the Adineh Rasht Complex. After his resignation, Rasool Falahati was chosen to take over his positions. He also founded the Islamic Azad University, Lahijan Branch.

== Works ==
Ghorbani published many works throughout his life, including:

- Towards the Eternal World
- History of Islamic Culture and Civilisation
- Islam and Human Rights
- The Cause of Progress in Islam and Decline of Muslims
- The Foundation of World Peace
- A Translation of Mulla Sadr's Treatise on the Creation of Deeds
- Philosophy of Human Creation
- The Biggest Disease of the 20th Century
- Islamic Ethics, Education and Training
- Translation of Volume 9 and 10 of al-Ghadir (complied while in prison)
- The Principles of Religion in the Light of the Infallibles (The Fourteen Infallibles)
- Islamic Government and Velayat Faqih
- The Worldview of Imam Ali (as) in the First Sermon of Nahj al-Balaghah
- Supplications of Shaaban
- Forty Hadith
- The Quran and the Divine Tradition

== Death ==
Ayatollah Zayn al-Abidin Qorbani Lahiji passed away at the age of 93 on 12 October 2026.

== See also ==
- List of ayatollahs
- List of members in the Second Term of the Council of Experts
- List of members in the Third Term of the Council of Experts
- List of members in the Fourth Term of the Council of Experts
- List of members in the Fifth Term of the Council of Experts
