= Chushadestan =

Chushadestan چوشادستان
- Village
- Location within Iran
- Coordinates: 37°14′00″N 49°58′00″E
- Country: Iran
- Province: Gilan
- County: Astaneh-ye Ashrafiyeh
- Bakhsh: Central
- Rural District: Kurka

Population (2006)
  - Total: 19
- Time zone: UTC+3:30 (IRST)

Chushadestan (Persian: چوشادستان, also Romanized as Chūshādestān; also known as Choosha Hanestan, Chūshāhestān, and Chushastan) is a suburb of Astaneh-ye Ashrafiyeh city and village in Kurka Rural District, in the Central District of Astaneh-ye Ashrafiyeh County, Gilan Province, Iran. In 2016 census there were no households residing in the village. At the 2006 census, its population was 19, in 6 families.
