= Leshkam =

Leshkam لشكام
- Village
- Location within Iran
- Coordinates: 37°21′09″N 50°02′23″E
- Country: Iran
- Province: Gilan
- County: Astaneh-ye Ashrafiyeh
- Bakhsh: Central
- Rural District: Dehshal

Population (2016)
  - Total: 371
- Time zone: UTC+3:30 (IRST)

Leshkam (Persian: لشكام, also Romanized as Leshkām; also known as Leshkām-e Bālā Maḩalleh) is a village in Dehshal Rural District, in the Central District of Astaneh-ye Ashrafiyeh County, Gilan Province, Iran. At the 2016 census, its population was 371, in 138 families. Down from 478 people in 2006.
