= Jeseydan =

Jeseydan جسيدان
- Village
- Location within Iran
- Coordinates: 37°16′06″N 49°57′53″E
- Country: Iran
- Province: Gilan
- County: Astaneh-ye Ashrafiyeh
- Bakhsh: Central
- Rural District: Kurka

Population (2016)
  - Total: 34
- Time zone: UTC+3:30 (IRST)

Jeseydan (Persian: جسيدان, also Romanized as Jeseydān) is a village in Kurka Rural District, in the Central District of Astaneh-ye Ashrafiyeh County, Gilan Province, Iran. At the 2016 census, its population was 34, in 13 families. Down from 41 in 2006.
