= Bazan, Iran =

Bazan بازان
- Village
- Location within Iran
- Coordinates: 37°14′02″N 49°54′05″E
- Country: Iran
- Province: Gilan
- County: Astaneh-ye Ashrafiyeh
- Bakhsh: Central
- Rural District: Kisom

Population (2016)
  - Total: 284
- Time zone: UTC+3:30 (IRST)

Bazan (Persian: بازان, also Romanized as Bāzān; also known as Bauzan) is a village in Kisom Rural District, in the Central District of Astaneh-ye Ashrafiyeh County, Gilan Province, Iran. At the 2016 census, its population was 284, in 113 families. Down from 360 people in 2006.
