= Tamchal =

Village in Gilan province, Iran

Tamchal Persian: تمچال
- Village
- Location within Iran
- Coordinates: 37°18′35″N 49°57′43″E
- Country: Iran
- Province: Gilan
- County: Astaneh-ye Ashrafiyeh
- District: Central
- Rural District: Kurka

Population (2016)
  - Total: 885
- Time zone: UTC+3:30 (IRST)

Tamchal (Persian: تمچال) (Note: Also romanized as Tamchāl and Tomchal; also known as Temīchāl, Tīmchāl, and Yatamchal) is a village in Kurka Rural District of the Central District in Astaneh-ye Ashrafiyeh County, Gilan province, Iran.

== Demographics ==
=== Population ===
At the time of the 2006 National Census, the village's population was 718 in 196 households. The following census in 2011 counted 805 people in 240 households. At the 2016 census, the population of the village was 885 people in 267 households.
