= Gowhardan =

Gowhardan گوهردان
- Village
- Location within Iran
- Coordinates: 37°17′08″N 49°57′50″E
- Country: Iran
- Province: Gilan
- County: Astaneh-ye Ashrafiyeh
- Bakhsh: Central
- Rural District: Kurka

Population (2016)
  - Total: 369
- Time zone: UTC+3:30 (IRST)

Gowhardan (Persian: گوهردان, also Romanized as Gowhardān; also known as Gogordyan) is a village in Kurka Rural District, in the Central District of Astaneh-ye Ashrafiyeh County, Gilan Province, Iran. At the 2016 census, its population was 369, in 133 families. Up from 344 in 2006.
