= Nowshar, Astaneh-ye Ashrafiyeh =

Nowshar نوشر
- Village
- Location within Iran
- Coordinates: 37°20′20″N 49°59′35″E
- Country: Iran
- Province: Gilan
- County: Astaneh-ye Ashrafiyeh
- Bakhsh: Central
- Rural District: Dehshal

Population (2016)
  - Total: 81
- Time zone: UTC+3:30 (IRST)

Nowshar (Persian: نوشر, also Romanized as Noshar) is a village in Dehshal Rural District, in the Central District of Astaneh-ye Ashrafiyeh County, Gilan Province, Iran. At the 2006 census, its population was 81, in 32 families. Down from 111 people in 2006.
