= Tasandeh =

Tasandeh تاسنده
- Village
- Location within Iran
- Coordinates: 37°20′53″N 50°04′19″E
- Country: Iran
- Province: Gilan
- County: Astaneh-ye Ashrafiyeh
- Bakhsh: Central
- Rural District: Dehshal

Population (2016)
  - Total: 109
- Time zone: UTC+3:30 (IRST)

Tasandeh (Persian: تاسنده, also Romanized as Tāsandeh) is a village in Dehshal Rural District, in the Central District of Astaneh-ye Ashrafiyeh County, Gilan Province, Iran. At the 2006 census, its population was 139, in 41 families. In 2016, its population was 109, in 49 households.
