= Estakhr-e Bijar =

Village in Gilan province, Iran

Estakhr-e Bijar Persian: استخربيجار
- Village
- Location within Iran
- Coordinates: 37°16′26″N 49°57′24″E
- Country: Iran
- Province: Gilan
- County: Astaneh-ye Ashrafiyeh
- District: Central
- Rural District: Kurka

Population (2016)
  - Total: 1,173
- Time zone: UTC+3:30 (IRST)

Estakhr-e Bijar (Persian: استخربيجار) (Note: Also romanized as Estakhr-e Bījār) is a village in Kurka Rural District of the Central District in Astaneh-ye Ashrafiyeh County, Gilan province, Iran.

== Demographics ==
=== Population ===
At the time of the 2006 National Census, the village's population was 839 in 252 households. The following census in 2011 counted 943 people in 308 households. At the 2016 census, the population of the village was 1,173 people in 371 households.
