= Ishliki =

Ishliki ایشلیکی
- Village
- Location within Iran
- Coordinates: 37°17′17″N 49°54′34″E
- Country: Iran
- Province: Gilan
- County: Astaneh-ye Ashrafiyeh
- Bakhsh: Central
- Rural District: Kurka

Population (2006)
  - Total: 168
- Time zone: UTC+3:30 (IRST)

Ishliki (Persian: ایشلیکی, also Romanized as Īshīkī; also known as Eshlīkī, Ishlik, Ishlyk, and Lashīkī) is a village in Kurka Rural District, in the Central District of Astaneh-ye Ashrafiyeh County, Gilan Province, Iran. At the 2006 census, its population was 174, in 51 families. In 2016, it had 168 people in 62 households.
