= Mardomkadeh =

Mardomkadeh مردمک ده
- Village
- Location within Iran
- Coordinates: 37°15′49″N 49°58′46″E
- Country: Iran
- Province: Gilan
- County: Astaneh-ye Ashrafiyeh
- Bakhsh: Central
- Rural District: Kurka

Population (2016)
  - Total: 265
- Time zone: UTC+3:30 (IRST)

Mardomkadeh (Persian: مردمک ده; also known as Mardeh Makadeh) is a village in Kurka Rural District, in the Central District of Astaneh-ye Ashrafiyeh County, Gilan Province, Iran. At the 2016 census, its population was 265, in 102 families.
