= Shadbondari =

Shadbondari شادبندری
- Village
- Interactive map of Shadbondari
- Coordinates: 37°19′47.521″N 49°55′20.158″E
- Country: Iran
- Province: Gilan
- County: Astaneh-ye Ashrafiyeh
- Bakhsh: Central
- Rural District: Kurka

Population (2016)
  - Total: 30
- Time zone: UTC+3:30 (IRST)

Shadbondari (Persian: شادبندری, also Romanized as Shādbondarī) is a village in Kurka Rural District, in the Central District of Astaneh-ye Ashrafiyeh County, Gilan Province, Iran. At the 2016 census, its population was 30, in 12 families. Decreased from 73 people in 2006.
