= Kurka, Iran =

Neighborhood in Gilan province, Iran

Kurka Persian: كوركا
- Neighborhood
- Location within Iran
- Coordinates: 37°16′39″N 49°55′46″E
- Country: Iran
- Province: Gilan
- County: Astaneh-ye Ashrafiyeh
- District: Central
- City: Astaneh-ye Ashrafiyeh

Population (2006)
  - Total: 2,206
- Time zone: UTC+3:30 (IRST)

Kurka (Persian: كوركا) (Note: Also romanized as Kūrkā; also known as Kūrpī) is a neighborhood in the city of Astaneh-ye Ashrafiyeh in the Central District of Astaneh-ye Ashrafiyeh County, Gilan province, Iran. As a village, it was the capital of Kurka Rural District until its capital was transferred to the village of Kashal-e Azad Sara.

== Demographics ==
=== Population ===
At the time of the 2006 National Census, Kurka's population was 2,206 in 635 households, when it was a village in Kurka Rural District. After the census, Kurka was absorbed by the city of Astaneh-ye Ashrafiyeh.
