= Kateh-ye Shast-e Abadan-e Chahardeh =

Village in Gilan province, Iran

Kateh-ye Shast-e Abadan-e Chahardeh Persian: كته شصت ابادان چهارده
- Village
- Location within Iran
- Coordinates: 37°13′32″N 49°49′54″E
- Country: Iran
- Province: Gilan
- County: Astaneh-ye Ashrafiyeh
- District: Central
- Rural District: Chahardeh

Population (2016)
  - Total: 360
- Time zone: UTC+3:30 (IRST)

Kateh-ye Shast-e Abadan-e Chahardeh (Persian: كته شصت ابادان چهارده) (Note: Also romanized as Kateh-ye Shaşt Ābādān-e Chahārdeh; also known as Katshaşt-e Ābādān) is a village in Chahardeh Rural District of the Central District in Astaneh-ye Ashrafiyeh County, Gilan province, Iran.

== Demographics ==
=== Population ===
At the time of the 2006 National Census, the village's population was 387 in 130 households. The following census in 2011 counted 350 people in 113 households. The 2016 census measured the population of the village as 360 people in 141 households.
