= Khalsha =

Village in Gilan province, Iran

Khalsha Persian: خلشا
- Village
- Location within Iran
- Coordinates: 37°12′03″N 49°48′28″E
- Country: Iran
- Province: Gilan
- County: Astaneh-ye Ashrafiyeh
- District: Central
- Rural District: Chahardeh

Population (2016)
  - Total: 120
- Time zone: UTC+3:30 (IRST)

Khalsha (Persian: خلشا) (Note: Also romanized as Khalshā, Khalsha’, and Kholashā) is a village in Chahardeh Rural District of the Central District in Astaneh-ye Ashrafiyeh County, Gilan province, Iran.

== Demographics ==
=== Population ===
At the time of the 2006 National Census, the village's population was 154 in 48 households. The following census in 2011 counted 125 people in 45 households. The 2016 census measured the population of the village as 120 people in 46 households.
