= Amshal =

Village in Gilan province, Iran

Amshal Persian: امشل
- Village
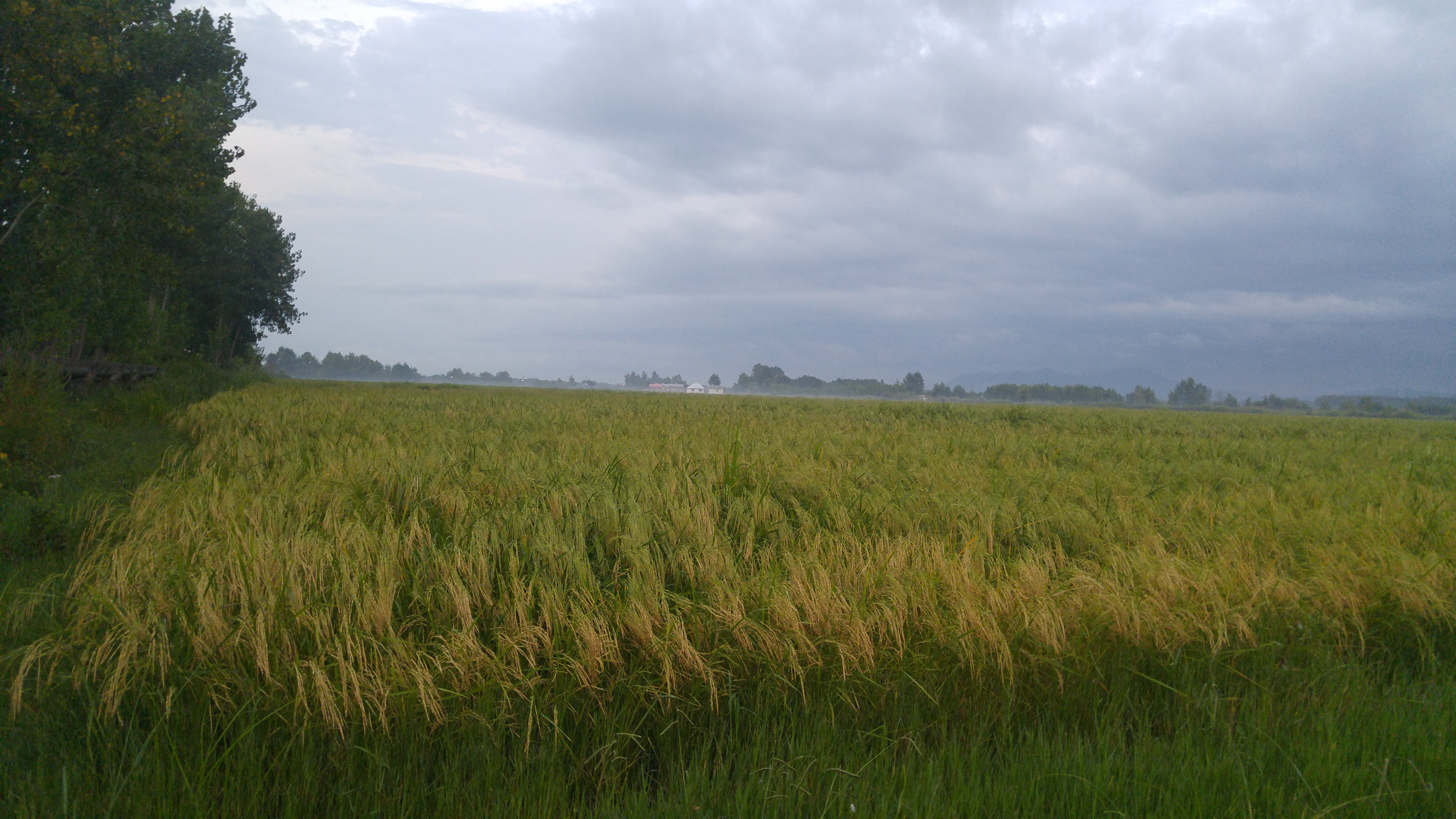
- The village of Amshal

- Location within Iran
- Coordinates: 37°14′48″N 49°54′33″E
- Country: Iran
- Province: Gilan
- County: Astaneh-ye Ashrafiyeh
- District: Central
- Rural District: Kisom

Population (2016)
  - Total: 394
- Time zone: UTC+3:30 (IRST)

Amshal (Persian: امشل) is a village in Kisom Rural District of the Central District in Astaneh-ye Ashrafiyeh County, Gilan province, Iran.

== Demographics ==
=== Population ===
At the time of the 2006 National Census, the village's population was 411 in 129 households. The following census in 2011 counted 433 people in 154 households. The 2016 census measured the population of the village as 394 people in 150 households.
