= Niaku =

Village in Gilan province, Iran

Niaku Persian: نياكو
- Village
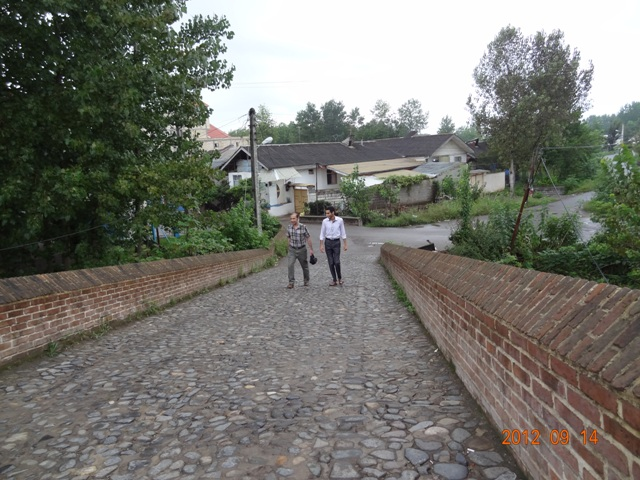
- Kheshti Bridge in the village of Niaku

- Location within Iran
- Coordinates: 37°14′34″N 49°57′08″E
- Country: Iran
- Province: Gilan
- County: Astaneh-ye Ashrafiyeh
- District: Central
- Rural District: Kisom

Population (2016)
  - Total: 870
- Time zone: UTC+3:30 (IRST)

Niaku (Persian: نياكو) (Note: Also romanized as Neyākū and Nīākū; also known as Niya Kooh) is a village in Kisom Rural District of the Central District in Astaneh-ye Ashrafiyeh County, Gilan province, Iran.

== Demographics ==
=== Population ===
At the time of the 2006 National Census, the village's population was 991 in 287 households. The following census in 2011 counted 933 people in 317 households. The 2016 census measured the population of the village as 870 people in 307 households.
