= Rahijan =

Rahijan راحيجان
- Village
- Location within Iran
- Coordinates: 37°13′22″N 49°51′01″E
- Country: Iran
- Province: Gilan
- County: Astaneh-ye Ashrafiyeh
- Bakhsh: Central
- Rural District: Kisom

Population (2016)
  - Total: 24
- Time zone: UTC+3:30 (IRST)

Rahijan (Persian: راحيجان, also Romanized as Rāḩījān; also known as Rāḩejān) is a village in Kisom Rural District, in the Central District of Astaneh-ye Ashrafiyeh County, Gilan Province, Iran. At the 2016 census, its population was 24, in 10 families. Decreased from 50 people in 2006.
