= Nazok Sara =

Nazok Sara نازک سرا
- Village
- Location within Iran
- Coordinates: 37°19′21″N 49°56′02″E
- Country: Iran
- Province: Gilan
- County: Astaneh-ye Ashrafiyeh
- Bakhsh: Central
- Rural District: Kurka

Population (2016)
  - Total: 421
- Time zone: UTC+3:30 (IRST)

Nazok Sara (Persian: نازک سرا, also Romanized as Nāzok Sarā) is a village in Kurka Rural District, in the Central District of Astaneh-ye Ashrafiyeh County, Gilan Province, Iran. At the 2006 census, its population was 439, in 133 families. In 2016, it had 421 people in 153 households.
