= Kamachal =

Kamachal or Kama Chal or Koma Chal (Persian: كماچال) may refer to:

- Kamachal-e Bala Mahalleh
- Kamachal-e Pain Mahalleh
