= Kisom =

Village in Gilan province, Iran

Kisom Persian: كيسم
- Village
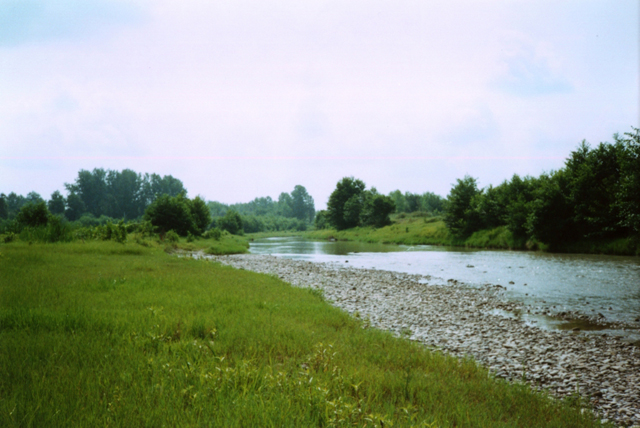
- Landscape in the village of Kisom

- Location within Iran
- Coordinates: 37°14′20″N 49°51′03″E
- Country: Iran
- Province: Gilan
- County: Astaneh-ye Ashrafiyeh
- District: Central
- Rural District: Kisom

Population (2016)
  - Total: 1,322
- Time zone: UTC+3:30 (IRST)

Kisom (Persian: كيسم) (Note: Also romanized as Kīsom; also known as Keysūm, Kīsūm, Kisum, and Pā’īn Maḩalleh-ye Kīsūm) is a village in, and the capital of, Kisom Rural District in the Central District of Astaneh-ye Ashrafiyeh County, Gilan province, Iran.

== Demographics ==
=== Population ===
At the time of the 2006 National Census, the village's population was 1,671 in 584 households. The following census in 2011 noted a population decrease at 1,214 people in 453 households. The 2016 census measured the population of the village as 1,322 people in 536 households.
