= Labeshka =

Labeshka لبشكا
- Village
- Location within Iran
- Coordinates: 37°21′22″N 50°00′37″E
- Country: Iran
- Province: Gilan
- County: Astaneh-ye Ashrafiyeh
- Bakhsh: Central
- Rural District: Dehshal

Population (2016)
  - Total: 97
- Time zone: UTC+3:30 (IRST)

Labeshka (Persian: لبشكا, also Romanized as Labeshkā; also known as Lishak and Līshkā) is a village in Dehshal Rural District, in the Central District of Astaneh-ye Ashrafiyeh County, Gilan Province, Iran. At the 2016 census, its population was 97, in 36 families. Down from 143 people in 2006.
