= Kashal =

Kashal may refer to:

- Kashal, Mawal, Pune district, Maharashtra, India
- Kashal, Siahkal, Gilan Province, Iran

== See also ==
- Kashal-e Azad (disambiguation)
