= Dargah, Astaneh-ye Ashrafiyeh =

Village in Gilan province, Iran

Dargah Persian: درگاه
- Village
- Location within Iran
- Coordinates: 37°18′32″N 50°01′05″E
- Country: Iran
- Province: Gilan
- County: Astaneh-ye Ashrafiyeh
- District: Central
- Rural District: Dehshal

Population (2016)
  - Total: 809
- Time zone: UTC+3:30 (IRST)

Dargah (Persian: درگاه) (Note: Also romanized as Dargāh; also known as Dargāh-e Bālā and Dehgah) is a village in Dehshal Rural District of the Central District in Astaneh-ye Ashrafiyeh County, Gilan province, Iran.

== Demographics ==
=== Population ===
At the time of the 2006 National Census, the village's population was 1,059 in 354 households. The following census in 2011 counted 921 people in 335 households. The 2016 census measured the population of the village as 809 people in 312 households.
