= Poshal =

Village in Gilan province, Iran

Poshal Persian: پشل
- Village
- Location within Iran
- Coordinates: 37°19′26″N 49°59′49″E
- Country: Iran
- Province: Gilan
- County: Astaneh-ye Ashrafiyeh
- District: Central
- Rural District: Dehshal

Population (2016)
  - Total: 524
- Time zone: UTC+3:30 (IRST)

Poshal (Persian: پشل) (Note: Also romanized as Pashal; also known as Pūshāl, Pūshal, and Veshāl) is a village in Dehshal Rural District of the Central District in Astaneh-ye Ashrafiyeh County, Gilan province, Iran.

== Demographics ==
=== Population ===
At the time of the 2006 National Census, the village's population was 612 in 176 households. The following census in 2011 counted 600 people in 208 households. The 2016 census measured the population of the village as 524 people in 198 households.
