= Kateh-ye Shast-e Abadan =

Village in Gilan province, Iran

Kateh-ye Shast-e Abadan Persian: كته شصت ابادان
- Village
- Location within Iran
- Coordinates: 37°12′25″N 49°49′18″E
- Country: Iran
- Province: Gilan
- County: Astaneh-ye Ashrafiyeh
- District: Central
- Rural District: Chahardeh

Population (2016)
  - Total: 453
- Time zone: UTC+3:30 (IRST)

Kateh-ye Shast-e Abadan (Persian: كته شصت ابادان) (Note: Also romanized as Kateh-ye Shaşt-e Ābādān; also known as Kashtabadan, Kat-e Shaşt Ābādān, Katsaf Abadan, and Katshaşt-e Ābādān) is a village in Chahardeh Rural District of the Central District in Astaneh-ye Ashrafiyeh County, Gilan province, Iran.

== Demographics ==
=== Population ===
At the time of the 2006 National Census, the village's population was 515 in 162 households. The following census in 2011 counted 438 people in 158 households. The 2016 census measured the population of the village as 453 people in 182 households.
