= Dehshal =

Village in Gilan province, Iran

Dehshal Persian: دهشال
- Village
- Location within Iran
- Coordinates: 37°19′05″N 50°02′11″E
- Country: Iran
- Province: Gilan
- County: Astaneh-ye Ashrafiyeh
- District: Central
- Rural District: Dehshal

Population (2016)
  - Total: 502
- Time zone: UTC+3:30 (IRST)

Dehshal (Persian: دهشال) (Note: Also romanized as Dehshāl) is a village in Dehshal Rural District of the Central District in Astaneh-ye Ashrafiyeh County, Gilan province, Iran.

== Demographics ==
=== Population ===
At the time of the 2006 National Census, the village's population was 695 in 229 households. The following census in 2011 counted 569 people in 206 households. The 2016 census measured the population of the village as 502 people in 201 households.
