= Mashak, Iran =

Mashak or Moshak (Persian: ماشك) in Iran may refer to:

- Mashak-e Sepahdari
- Mashak-e Tehranchi
