= Parka Posht =

Parka Posht or Parkaposht (Persian: پرکاپشت) may refer to:

- Parka Posht-e Mehdikhani
- Parka Posht-e Yavarzadeh
