= Gachara-ye Chahardeh =

Village in Gilan province, Iran

Gachara-ye Chahardeh Persian: گاچراچهارده
- Village
- Location within Iran
- Coordinates: 37°14′13″N 49°49′46″E
- Country: Iran
- Province: Gilan
- County: Astaneh-ye Ashrafiyeh
- District: Central
- Rural District: Chahardeh

Population (2016)
  - Total: 583
- Time zone: UTC+3:30 (IRST)

Gachara-ye Chahardeh (Persian: گاچراچهارده) (Note: Also romanized as Gācharā-ye Chahārdeh; also known as Gācharā and Kāchareh) is a village in Chahardeh Rural District of the Central District in Astaneh-ye Ashrafiyeh County, Gilan province, Iran.

== Demographics ==
=== Population ===
At the time of the 2006 National Census, the village's population was 675 in 226 households. The following census in 2011 counted 605 people in 215 households. The 2016 census measured the population of the village as 583 people in 226 households.
