= Khoshkarvandan =

Village in Gilan province, Iran

Khoshkarvandan Persian: خشكاروندان
- Village
- Location within Iran
- Coordinates: 37°16′32″N 49°54′00″E
- Country: Iran
- Province: Gilan
- County: Astaneh-ye Ashrafiyeh
- District: Central
- Rural District: Kurka

Population (2016)
  - Total: 792
- Time zone: UTC+3:30 (IRST)

Khoshkarvandan (Persian: خشكاروندان) (Note: Also romanized as Khoshkārvandān; also known as Khoshkāvandān) is a village in Kurka Rural District of the Central District in Astaneh-ye Ashrafiyeh County, Gilan province, Iran.

== Demographics ==
=== Population ===
At the time of the 2006 National Census, the village's population was 820 in 233 households. The following census in 2011 counted 963 people in 309 households. At the 2016 census, the population of the village was 792 people in 271 households.
