= Kisom Jukol =

Kisom Jukol كيسم جوكل
- Village
- Location within Iran
- Coordinates: 37°14′52″N 49°56′57″E
- Country: Iran
- Province: Gilan
- County: Astaneh-ye Ashrafiyeh
- Bakhsh: Central
- Rural District: Kisom

Population (2016)
  - Total: 144
- Time zone: UTC+3:30 (IRST)

Kisom Jukol (Persian: كيسم جوكل, also Romanized as Kīsom Jūkol; also known as Kīsom Jūykol and Kisom Chūkol) is a village in Kisom Rural District, in the Central District of Astaneh-ye Ashrafiyeh County, Gilan Province, Iran. At the 2006 census, its population was 147, in 43 families. In 2016, its population was 144, in 55 households.
