= Tajan, Iran =

Tajan (Persian: تجن) may refer to:

- Tajan, Gilan
- Tajan Gukeh, Gilan Province
- Tajan, South Khorasan
- Tajan Rural District, in Razavi Khorasan Province
