= Kacha-ye Chahardeh =

Village in Gilan province, Iran

Kacha-ye Chahardeh Persian: كاچاچهارده
- Village
- Location within Iran
- Coordinates: 37°13′57″N 49°48′15″E
- Country: Iran
- Province: Gilan
- County: Astaneh-ye Ashrafiyeh
- District: Central
- Rural District: Chahardeh

Population (2016)
  - Total: 800
- Time zone: UTC+3:30 (IRST)

Kacha-ye Chahardeh (Persian: كاچاچهارده) (Note: Also romanized as Kāchā-ye Chahārdeh; also known as Kāchā, Kachan, Kacheh, Kācheh, Kajjeh, and Kāshā) is a village in Chahardeh Rural District of the Central District in Astaneh-ye Ashrafiyeh County, Gilan province, Iran.

== Demographics ==
=== Population ===
At the time of the 2006 National Census, the village's population was 964 in 329 households. The following census in 2011 counted 856 people in 310 households. The 2016 census measured the population of the village as 800 people in 302 households.
