= Siah Kucheh =

Village in Gilan province, Iran

Siah Kucheh Persian: سياه كوچه
- Village
- Location within Iran
- Coordinates: 37°14′14″N 49°56′56″E
- Country: Iran
- Province: Gilan
- County: Astaneh-ye Ashrafiyeh
- District: Central
- Rural District: Kisom

Population (2016)
  - Total: 849
- Time zone: UTC+3:30 (IRST)

Siah Kucheh (Persian: سياه كوچه) (Note: Also romanized as Sīāh Kūcheh) is a village in Kisom Rural District of the Central District in Astaneh-ye Ashrafiyeh County, Gilan province, Iran.

== Demographics ==
=== Population ===
At the time of the 2006 National Census, the village's population was 712 in 218 households. The following census in 2011 counted 895 people in 301 households. The 2016 census measured the population of the village as 849 people in 305 households.
