= Taham, Gilan =

Taham تهام
- Village
- Location within Iran
- Coordinates: 37°13′31″N 49°54′48″E
- Country: Iran
- Province: Gilan
- County: Astaneh-ye Ashrafiyeh
- Bakhsh: Central
- Rural District: Kisom

Population (2016)
  - Total: 150
- Time zone: UTC+3:30 (IRST)

Taham (Persian: تهام, also Romanized as Tahām) is a village in Kisom Rural District, in the Central District of Astaneh-ye Ashrafiyeh County, Gilan Province, Iran. At the 2006 census, its population was 179, in 53 families. In 2016, its population was 150, in 55 households.
