= Tazehabad-e Fushazdeh =

Tazehabad-e Fushazdeh تازه‌آباد فوشازده
- Village
- Location within Iran
- Coordinates: 37°19′58″N 50°02′08″E
- Country: Iran
- Province: Gilan
- County: Astaneh-ye Ashrafiyeh
- Bakhsh: Central
- Rural District: Dehshal

Population (2016)
  - Total: 93
- Time zone: UTC+3:30 (IRST)

Tazehabad-e Fushazdeh (Persian: تازه‌آباد فوشازده, also Romanized as Tāzehābād-e Fūshāzdeh; also known as Tāzehābād) is a village in Dehshal Rural District, in the Central District of Astaneh-ye Ashrafiyeh County, Gilan Province, Iran. At the 2006 census, its population was 103, in 32 families. In 2016, its population was 93, in 36 households.
