= Kinchah =

Kinchah كين چاه
- Village
- Location within Iran
- Coordinates: 37°20′11″N 49°55′39″E
- Country: Iran
- Province: Gilan
- County: Astaneh-ye Ashrafiyeh
- Bakhsh: Central
- Rural District: Kurka

Population (2016)
  - Total: 296
- Time zone: UTC+3:30 (IRST)

Kinchah (Persian: كين چاه, also Romanized as Kīnchāh; also known as Kin’cha) is a village in Kurka Rural District, in the Central District of Astaneh-ye Ashrafiyeh County, Gilan Province, Iran. At the 2006 census, its population was 303, in 91 families. In 2016, it had 296 people in 117 households.
