= Kelid Sar =

Kelid Sar كليدسر
- Village
- Location within Iran
- Coordinates: 37°18′54″N 50°02′58″E
- Country: Iran
- Province: Gilan
- County: Astaneh-ye Ashrafiyeh
- Bakhsh: Central
- Rural District: Dehshal

Population (2016)
  - Total: 161
- Time zone: UTC+3:30 (IRST)

Kelid Sar (Persian: كليدسر, also Romanized as Kelīd Sar) is a village in Dehshal Rural District, in the Central District of Astaneh-ye Ashrafiyeh County, Gilan Province, Iran. At the 2016 census, its population was 161, in 68 families. Down from 266 people in 2006.
