= Sheshkal =

Village in Gilan province, Iran

Sheshkal Persian: ششکل
- Village
- Location within Iran
- Coordinates: 37°21′10″N 50°03′22″E
- Country: Iran
- Province: Gilan
- County: Astaneh-ye Ashrafiyeh
- District: Central
- Rural District: Dehshal

Population (2016)
  - Total: 1,140
- Time zone: UTC+3:30 (IRST)

Sheshkal (Persian: ششکل) (Note: Also romanized as Sheshkel; also known as Shishkal) is a village in Dehshal Rural District of the Central District in Astaneh-ye Ashrafiyeh County, Gilan province, Iran.

== Demographics ==
=== Population ===
At the time of the 2006 National Census, the village's population was 1,393 in 408 households. The following census in 2011 counted 1,274 people in 425 households. The 2016 census measured the population of the village as 1,140 people in 412 households. It was the most populous village in its rural district.
