= Lafut =

Lafut (Persian: لفوت) may refer to:

- Lafut-e Bala
- Lafut-e Pain
