= Shirkuh, Iran =

Shirkuh or Shir Kuh or ShirKooh (Persian: شيركوه) in Iran may refer to:

- Shir Kuh, Gilan
- Shirkuh, Astaneh-ye Ashrafiyeh, Gilan province
- Shirkuh-e Chahardeh, Gilan province
- Shirkuh, Qazvin
- Shir Kuh, a mountain in Yazd province
- Shirkuh Rural District, in Yazd province
