= Fushazdeh =

Fushazdeh فوشازده
- Village
- Location within Iran
- Coordinates: 37°19′28″N 50°03′10″E
- Country: Iran
- Province: Gilan
- County: Astaneh-ye Ashrafiyeh
- Bakhsh: Central
- Rural District: Dehshal

Population (2016)
  - Total: 484
- Time zone: UTC+3:30 (IRST)

Fushazdeh (Persian: فوشازده, also Romanized as Fūshāzdeh) is a village in Dehshal Rural District, in the Central District of Astaneh-ye Ashrafiyeh County, Gilan Province, Iran. At the 2016 census, its population was 484, in 191 families. Down from 625 people in 2006.
