= Tajin =

Tajin may refer to:

- El Tajín, an archeological site in Mexico
- Tajín seasoning, a Mexican seasoning containing chili peppers, lime, and salt
- Tajin, Iran, a village
- Tajin (comedian) (Yuzo Ishikawa, born 1962), Japanese comedian
- Tagine, or tajin, a Maghrebi dish
