= Amir Hendeh =

Amir Hendeh (Persian: اميرهنده) may refer to:

- Amir Hendeh, Dehshal
- Amir Hendeh, Kisom
