= Chur Kuchan =

Village in Gilan province, Iran

Chur Kuchan Persian: چور كوچان
- Village
- Location within Iran
- Coordinates: 37°16′22″N 49°57′48″E
- Country: Iran
- Province: Gilan
- County: Astaneh-ye Ashrafiyeh
- District: Central
- Rural District: Kurka

Population (2016)
  - Total: 1,271
- Time zone: UTC+3:30 (IRST)

Chur Kuchan (Persian: چوركوچان) (Note: Also romanized as Chever Kūchān and Chūr Kūchān; also known as Chever Kūkhān) is a village in Kurka Rural District of the Central District in Astaneh-ye Ashrafiyeh County, Gilan province, Iran.

== Demographics ==
=== Population ===
At the time of the 2006 National Census, the village's population was 1,586 in 428 households. The following census in 2011 counted 1,319 people in 429 households. At the 2016 census, the population of the village was 1,271 people in 441 households. It was the most populous village in its rural district.
