= Karsidan =

Village in Gilan province, Iran

Karsidan Persian: كارسيدان
- Village
- Location within Iran
- Coordinates: 37°17′49″N 49°58′56″E
- Country: Iran
- Province: Gilan
- County: Astaneh-ye Ashrafiyeh
- District: Central
- Rural District: Dehshal

Population (2016)
  - Total: 742
- Time zone: UTC+3:30 (IRST)

Karsidan (Persian: كارسيدان) (Note: Also romanized as Kārsīdān) is a village in Dehshal Rural District of the Central District in Astaneh-ye Ashrafiyeh County, Gilan province, Iran.

== Demographics ==
=== Population ===
At the time of the 2006 National Census, the village's population was 868 in 255 households. The following census in 2011 counted 832 people in 280 households. The 2016 census measured the population of the village as 742 people in 285 households.
