= Khalsha-ye Chahardeh =

Village in Gilan province, Iran

Khalsha-ye Chahardeh Persian: خلشاچهارده
- Village
- Location within Iran
- Coordinates: 37°12′46″N 49°48′04″E
- Country: Iran
- Province: Gilan
- County: Astaneh-ye Ashrafiyeh
- District: Central
- Rural District: Chahardeh

Population (2016)
  - Total: 270
- Time zone: UTC+3:30 (IRST)

Khalsha-ye Chahardeh (Persian: خلشاچهارده) (Note: Also romanized as Khalshā-ye Chahārdeh, Kholsha-ye Chahardeh, Kholshā-ye Chahārdeh and Kholshā’-ye Chahārdeh) is a village in Chahardeh Rural District of the Central District in Astaneh-ye Ashrafiyeh County, Gilan province, Iran.

== Demographics ==
=== Population ===
At the time of the 2006 National Census, the village's population was 331 in 104 households. The following census in 2011 counted 285 people in 90 households. The 2016 census measured the population of the village as 270 people in 102 households.
