= Birboneh =

Birboneh or Bir Boneh or Bir Benah (Persian: بيربنه) may refer to:

- Birboneh-ye Bala
- Birboneh-ye Pain
