= Tazehabad-e Marzian =

Village in Gilan province, Iran

Tazehabad-e Marzian Persian: تازه ابادمرزيان
- Village
- Location within Iran
- Country: Iran
- Province: Gilan
- County: Astaneh-ye Ashrafiyeh
- District: Central
- Rural District: Chahardeh

Population (2016)
  - Total: 197
- Time zone: UTC+3:30 (IRST)

Tazehabad-e Marzian (Persian: تازه آباد مرزيان) (Note: Also romanized as Tāzehābād-e Marzīān; also known as Tāzehābād) is a village in Chahardeh Rural District of the Central District in Astaneh-ye Ashrafiyeh County, Gilan province, Iran.

== Demographics ==
=== Population ===
At the time of the 2006 National Census, the village's population was 189 in 70 households. The following census in 2011 counted 149 people in 49 households. The 2016 census measured the population of the village as 197 people in 82 households.
