= Gurab Javar =

Gurab Javar گوراب جوار
- Village
- Location within Iran
- Coordinates: 37°17′25″N 49°58′09″E
- Country: Iran
- Province: Gilan
- County: Astaneh-ye Ashrafiyeh
- Bakhsh: Central
- Rural District: Kurka

Population (2016)
  - Total: 289
- Time zone: UTC+3:30 (IRST)

Gurab Javar (Persian: گوراب جوار, also Romanized as Gūrāb Javār) is a village in Kurka Rural District, in the Central District of Astaneh-ye Ashrafiyeh County, Gilan Province, Iran. At the 2016 census, its population was 289, in 106 families. Down from 373 people in 2006.
