= Kamachal-e Pain Mahalleh =

Kamachal-e Pain Mahalleh كماچال پایين محله
- Village
- Location within Iran
- Coordinates: 37°15′04″N 49°58′35″E
- Country: Iran
- Province: Gilan
- County: Astaneh-ye Ashrafiyeh
- Bakhsh: Central
- Rural District: Kisom

Population (2016)
  - Total: 258
- Time zone: UTC+3:30 (IRST)

Kamachal-e Pain Mahalleh (Persian: كماچال پایين محله, also Romanized as Kamāchāl-e Pā’īn Maḩalleh; also known as Kamāchāl) is a village in Kisom Rural District, in the Central District of Astaneh-ye Ashrafiyeh County, Gilan Province, Iran. At the 2006 census, its population was 306, in 97 families. In 2016, its population was 258, in 100 households.
