= Zir Deh, Astaneh-ye Ashrafiyeh =

Zir Deh زيرده
- Village
- Location within Iran
- Coordinates: 37°18′39″N 50°03′17″E
- Country: Iran
- Province: Gilan
- County: Astaneh-ye Ashrafiyeh
- Bakhsh: Central
- Rural District: Dehshal

Population (2016)
  - Total: 13
- Time zone: UTC+3:30 (IRST)

Zir Deh (Persian: زيرده, also Romanized as Zīr Deh) is a village in Dehshal Rural District, in the Central District of Astaneh-ye Ashrafiyeh County, Gilan Province, Iran. At the 2016 census, its population was 13, in 6 families. Down from 19 people in 2006.
