= Birboneh-ye Bala =

Birboneh-ye Bala بيربنه بالا
- Village
- Location within Iran
- Coordinates: 37°13′34″N 49°54′00″E
- Country: Iran
- Province: Gilan
- County: Astaneh-ye Ashrafiyeh
- Bakhsh: Central
- Rural District: Kisom

Population (2016)
  - Total: 82
- Time zone: UTC+3:30 (IRST)

Birboneh-ye Bala (Persian: بيربنه بالا, also Romanized as Bīrboneh-ye Bālā; also known as Bīr Boneh and Bīrboneh) is a village in Kisom Rural District, in the Central District of Astaneh-ye Ashrafiyeh County, Gilan Province, Iran. At the 2006 census, its population was 111, in 37 families. In 2016, its population was 82, in 38 households.
