= Tajan Gukeh =

Village in Gilan province, Iran

Tajan Gukeh Persian: تجن گوكه
- Village
- Location within Iran
- Coordinates: 37°13′51″N 49°55′18″E
- Country: Iran
- Province: Gilan
- County: Astaneh-ye Ashrafiyeh
- District: Central
- Rural District: Kisom

Population (2016)
  - Total: 1,809
- Time zone: UTC+3:30 (IRST)

Tajan Gukeh (Persian: تجن گوكه) (Note: Also romanized as Tajan Gūkeh and Tajen Gūgēh; also known as Tajan Gū’eh-ye Bālā and Teshenguke) is a village in Kisom Rural District of the Central District in Astaneh-ye Ashrafiyeh County, Gilan province, Iran.

== Demographics ==
=== Population ===
At the time of the 2006 National Census, the village's population was 2,186 in 663 households. The following census in 2011 counted 2,089 people in 692 households. The 2016 census measured the population of the village as 1,809 people in 643 households. It was the most populous village in its rural district.
