= Ju Posht, Astaneh-ye Ashrafiyeh =

Ju Posht جوپشت
- Village
- Interactive map of Ju Posht
- Coordinates: 37°18′12.532″N 49°54′39.528″E
- Country: Iran
- Province: Gilan
- County: Astaneh-ye Ashrafiyeh
- Bakhsh: Central
- Rural District: Kurka

Population (2016)
  - Total: 148
- Time zone: UTC+3:30 (IRST)

Ju Posht (Persian: جوپشت, also Romanized as Jū Posht) is a village in Kurka Rural District, in the Central District of Astaneh-ye Ashrafiyeh County, Gilan Province, Iran. At the 2016 census, its population was 148, in 56 families. Up from 135 in 2006.
