= Lafut-e Pain =

Lafut-e Pain لفوت پائين
- Village
- Location within Iran
- Coordinates: 37°18′17″N 49°55′12″E
- Country: Iran
- Province: Gilan
- County: Astaneh-ye Ashrafiyeh
- Bakhsh: Central
- Rural District: Kurka

Population (2016)
  - Total: 232
- Time zone: UTC+3:30 (IRST)

Lafut-e Pain (Persian: لفوت پایین, also romanized as Lafūt-e Pā’īn) is a village in Kurka Rural District, in the Central District of Astaneh-ye Ashrafiyeh County, Gilan Province, Iran. At the 2006 census, its population was 304, in 90 families. In 2016, it had 232 people in 93 households.
