= Amir Hendeh, Kisom =

Village in Gilan province, Iran

Amir Hendeh Persian: اميرهنده
- Village
- Location within Iran
- Coordinates: 37°13′16″N 49°55′35″E
- Country: Iran
- Province: Gilan
- County: Astaneh-ye Ashrafiyeh
- District: Central
- Rural District: Kisom

Population (2016)
  - Total: 652
- Time zone: UTC+3:30 (IRST)

Amir Hendeh (Persian: اميرهنده) (Note: Also romanized as Amīr Hendeh; also known as Gūkeh and Gūkeh-ye Amīrhandeh) is a village in Kisom Rural District of the Central District in Astaneh-ye Ashrafiyeh County, Gilan province, Iran.

== Demographics ==
=== Population ===
At the time of the 2006 National Census, the village's population was 664 in 207 households. The following census in 2011 counted 478 people in 164 households. The 2016 census measured the population of the village as 652 people in 242 households.
