= Salestan =

Salestan (Persian: سالستان) may refer to:

- Salestan, Astaneh-ye Ashrafiyeh
- Salestan, Rasht
