= Shirkuh-e Chahardeh =

Village in Gilan province, Iran

Shirkuh-e Chahardeh Persian: شيركوه چهارده
- Village
- Location within Iran
- Coordinates: 37°13′26″N 49°48′51″E
- Country: Iran
- Province: Gilan
- County: Astaneh-ye Ashrafiyeh
- District: Central
- Rural District: Chahardeh

Population (2016)
  - Total: 882
- Time zone: UTC+3:30 (IRST)

Shirkuh-e Chahardeh (Persian: شيركوه چهارده) (Note: Also romanized as Shīrkūh-e Chahārdeh; also known as Shir Kooh, Shīr Kūh, Shīrkūh, and Shirkukh) is a village in, and the capital of, Chahardeh Rural District in the Central District of Astaneh-ye Ashrafiyeh County, Gilan province, Iran.

== Demographics ==
=== Population ===
At the time of the 2006 National Census, the village's population was 999 in 323 households. The following census in 2011 counted 968 people in 347 households. The 2016 census measured the population of the village as 882 people in 349 households. It was the most populous village in its rural district.
