= Kaldeh, Astaneh-ye Ashrafiyeh =

Kaldeh كلده
- Village
- Location within Iran
- Coordinates: 37°13′08″N 49°52′26″E
- Country: Iran
- Province: Gilan
- County: Astaneh-ye Ashrafiyeh
- Bakhsh: Central
- Rural District: Kisom

Population (2016)
  - Total: 224
- Time zone: UTC+3:30 (IRST)

Kaldeh (Persian: كلده) is a village in Kisom Rural District, in the Central District of Astaneh-ye Ashrafiyeh County, Gilan Province, Iran. At the 2006 census, its population was 224, in 83 families. Decreased from 345 people in 2006.
