= Ju Posht =

Ju Posht (Persian: جوپشت) may refer to:

- Ju Posht, Astaneh-ye Ashrafiyeh
- Ju Posht, Rasht

== See also ==
- Posht Ju
