= Amir Hendeh, Dehshal =

Village in Gilan province, Iran

Amir Hendeh Persian: اميرهنده
- Village
- Location within Iran
- Coordinates: 37°20′10″N 50°04′10″E
- Country: Iran
- Province: Gilan
- County: Astaneh-ye Ashrafiyeh
- District: Central
- Rural District: Dehshal

Population (2016)
  - Total: 767
- Time zone: UTC+3:30 (IRST)

Amir Hendeh (Persian: اميرهنده) (Note: Also romanized as Amīr Hendeh; also known as Bālā Maḩalleh-ye Amīr Hendeh) is a village in Dehshal Rural District of the Central District in Astaneh-ye Ashrafiyeh County, Gilan province, Iran.

== Demographics ==
=== Population ===
At the time of the 2006 National Census, the village's population was 970 in 303 households. The following census in 2011 counted 817 people in 299 households. The 2016 census measured the population of the village as 767 people in 308 households.
