= Lafut-e Bala =

Lafut-e Bala لفوت بالا
- Village
- Location within Iran
- Coordinates: 37°18′53″N 49°53′21″E
- Country: Iran
- Province: Gilan
- County: Astaneh-ye Ashrafiyeh
- Bakhsh: Central
- Rural District: Kurka

Population (2016)
  - Total: 300
- Time zone: UTC+3:30 (IRST)

Lafut-e Bala (Persian: لفوت بالا, also Romanized as Lafūt-e Bālā; also known as Lafūt) is a village in Kurka Rural District, in the Central District of Astaneh-ye Ashrafiyeh County, Gilan Province, Iran. At the 2006 census, its population was 357, in 108 families. In 2016, it had 300 people in 112 households.
