= Mashak-e Tehranchi =

Village in Gilan province, Iran

Mashak-e Tehranchi Persian: ماشک تهرانچی
- Village
- Location within Iran
- Coordinates: 37°18′29″N 49°54′05″E
- Country: Iran
- Province: Gilan
- County: Astaneh-ye Ashrafiyeh
- District: Central
- Rural District: Kurka

Population (2016)
  - Total: 857
- Time zone: UTC+3:30 (IRST)

Mashak-e Tehranchi (Persian: ماشک تهرانچی) (Note: Also romanized as Māshak-e Tehrānchī; also known as Māshak) is a village in Kurka Rural District of the Central District in Astaneh-ye Ashrafiyeh County, Gilan province, Iran.

== Demographics ==
=== Population ===
At the time of the 2006 National Census, the village's population was 1,018 in 296 households. The following census in 2011 counted 1,000 people in 354 households. At the 2016 census, the population of the village was 857 people in 325 households.
