= Kashal-e Azad =

Kashal-e Azad (Persian: كشل ازاد) may refer to:

- Kashal-e Azad Mahalleh
- Kashal-e Azad Sara
