= Rasoul Falahati Gilani =

Iranian cleric (born 1963)

- رسول فلاحتی گیلانی
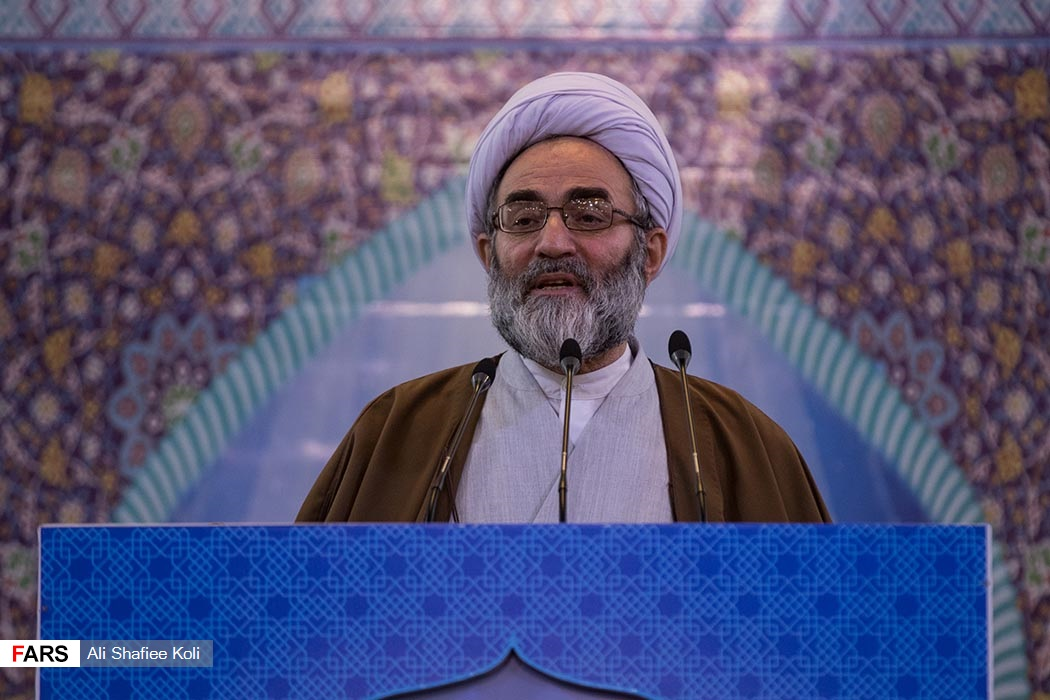
- Hojjatoleslam Rasoul Fallahati during his first Friday prayer as Imam of Rasht

Member of the Assembly of Experts
- Incumbent
- Assumed office 1 June 2024
- Constituency: Gilan Province

Representative of the Supreme Leader
- Incumbent
- Assumed office 3 April 2018
- Appointed by: Ali Khamenei
- Preceded by: Zaynolabideen Ghorbani
- Constituency: Gilan Province

Personal details
- Born: 1963 (age 62–63) Sasemas, Iran
- Website: r-falahati.ir

Rasoul Falahati Gilani (Persian: رسول فلاحتی گیلانی; born 1963 in Soumeh-e-Sara) is an Iranian Shiite cleric, Friday prayer leader of Rasht, and representative of the Supreme Leader in Gilan Province. Falahati is also the representative of Gilan Province in the Supreme Leader's Assembly of Experts. He is a professor of jurisprudence and principles at the Gilan and Qom seminaries. He was also appointed as the director of the Gilan seminary for a short time. Since 1986, he has been teaching seminary levels such as Sharh Lam'ah, Rasa'il, Makasib, and Kifayah. He has also privately taught Allama Tabataba'i's Bidayah Al-Hikmah and Nihayah Al-Hikmah, and is currently teaching three books: Rasa'il, Makasib, and Kifayah.

== Biography ==
Rasoul Falahati was born in 1342 in the village of "Sasemas" in the Soumeh Sara region to a farming family. In 1357, he completed his first year of high school at Rasht Commercial High School, but did not complete his high school education in Rasht due to his interest in the seminary. At the beginning of the 1358 academic year, he entered the Seminary of Qom at the age of 16 and studied high school courses alongside seminary courses. He completed his preparatory courses at the “Imam Sadeq School” and studied Sharh Lam'ah by Qodratullah Vojdani-Fakhr, Ali Panah Eshtehardi, and Hossein Shabzendehdar Jahromi, and studied Usul al-Fiqh by Esmail Salehi Mazandarani. In the higher levels, he used the book Rasa’il Sheikh Ansari from Mustafa Etemadi and Makasib from Gholamreza Salavati, Morteza Bani Fadl and Yadollah Duzduzani Tabrizi. He used the first volume of Kifayah al-Usul by Akhund Khorasani from Yadollah Dozduzani and the second volume from Mohammad Taqi Sotoudeh. He used the philosophy course from Abdullah Javadi Amoli and Yahya Ansari Shirazi. He studied the non-jurisprudence and principles course with Mohammad Fazel Lankarani, Mirza Javad Tabrizi, Nasser Makarem Shirazi, and Mohammad Taqi Bahjat Foumani and benefited most from Mohammad Fazel Lankarani and wrote his non-jurisprudence commentary on the topic of Hajj and his non-usul topics in Arabic.

== Teachers ==
Among his known teachers are as follows:

- Qodratollah Vojdani-Fakhr
- Ali Panah Eshtehardi
- Hossein Shabzendehdar Jahromi
- Esmail Salehi Mazandarani
- Mustafa Etemadi Tabrizi
- Gholamreza Salavati
- Morteza Bani Fadl
- Grand Ayatollah Yadollah Duzduzani Tabrizi
- Grand Ayatollah Mirza Javad Tabrizi
- Mohammad Taqi Sotoudeh
- Grand Ayatollah Abdollah Javadi Amoli
- Yahya Ansari Shirazi
- Grand Ayatollah Mohammad Fazel Lankarani
- Grand Ayatollah Naser Makarem Shirazi
- Grand Ayatollah Mohammad-Taghi Bahjat Foumani

== Compilations ==
Among his known compilations are:

- Spirituality in Hajj, 1374, printed (Persian).
- Noor al-Fiqh, 1375, printed, (Arabic). (He also spent about three years at the Jurisprudential Center of the Pure Imams (a.s.) under the supervision of Ayatollah Mohammad Fazel Lankarani, conducting specialized research and compiling discussions on the new issues of Hajj, which resulted in this book.)
- Explanatory Notes on Issues Outside Jurisprudence, unpublished, (Arabic).
- Explanatory Notes on Issues Outside Usul, unpublished, (Arabic).

== Records and responsibilities ==
- The fourth representative of the Supreme Leader in Gilan
- Lecturer at higher levels of the seminary

== Social and political views ==
In his November 29, 2024 sermon on Baran TV in Rasht, Islamic Republic of Iran, Rasoul Falahati, Ayatollah Khamenei’s representative in Gilan province urged the country to develop nuclear weapons to instill fear in the hearts of "infidel" world leaders.

On May 5, 2026 in a post in X Rasoul Falahati publicly thanked the Islamic Republic’s Judiciary for hanging January protestors. He twitted: They should not think the war made us forget January. These people must face the gallows.

On Friday, May 30, 2026 in his Friday sermon Hojatoleslam Rasoul Falahati the Supreme Leader's representative in Rasht declared: Iran revolution is not limited to Iran, but a divine mission to save humanity. He declared: Even the enemies have realized this revolution has reach and is meant to eradicate all the world’s corrupt rulers.

During one of the nightly demonstrations in Rasht in support of Iran's war with America and Israel, Rasoul Falahati delivered a speech and in it he condemned unveiled female participants. He accused the unveiled women of standing against "the system and the Quran". He called them: "immoral and immodest". He warned them: "Do not think these people will put up with you." He stated that if the public decided to confront them, "they would do something that would make you no longer dare to leave your homes".

== See also ==
- List of provincial representatives appointed by Supreme Leader of Iran
