= Syed Ahmed Rizvi Kashmiri =

Kashmiri Shi'a jurist and scholar (1901 – 1964)

Ayatollah Agha آیت اللہ آقا Syed Ahmad Razavi Kashmiri
- سید احمد رضوی کشمیری
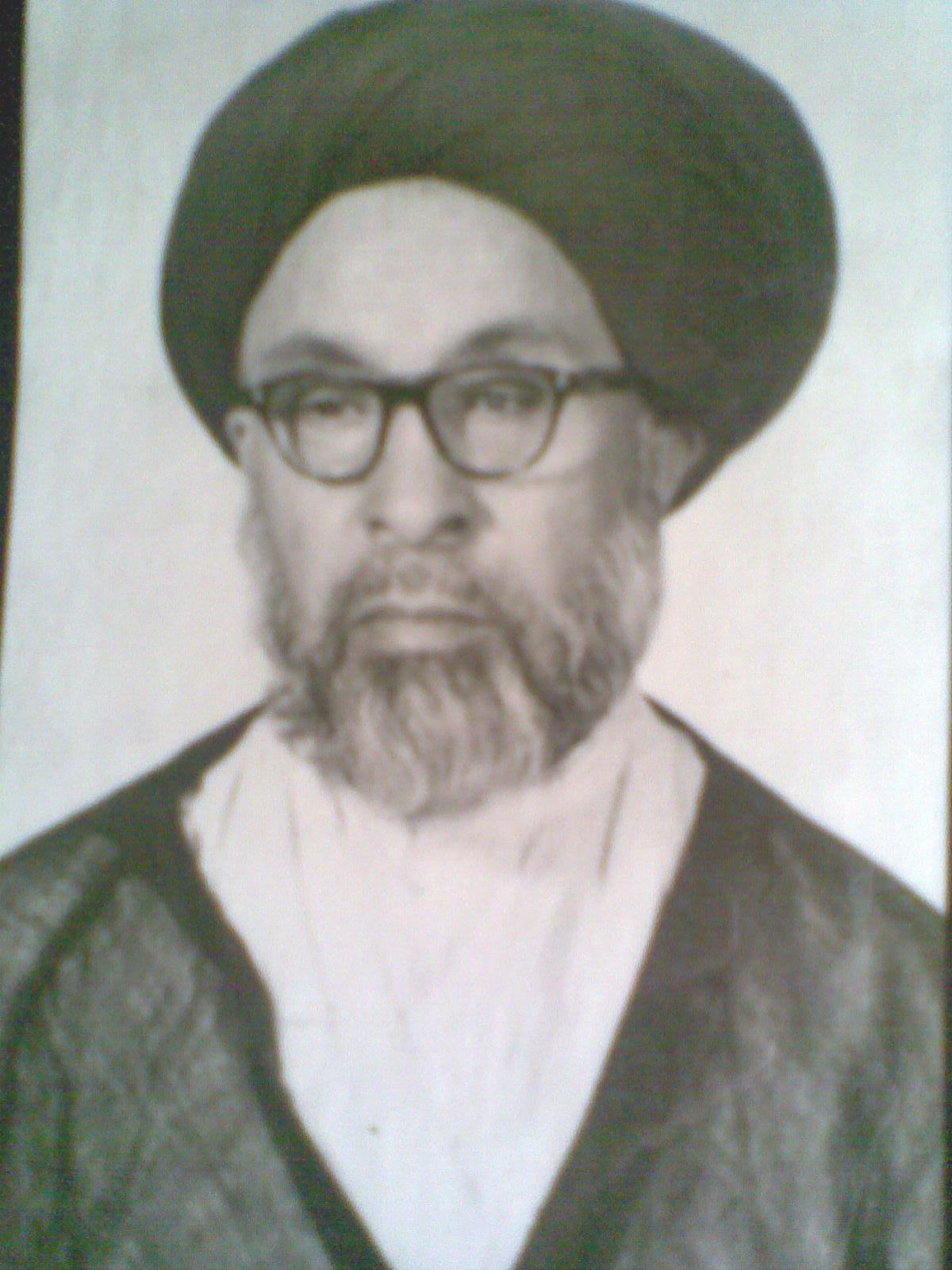
- Title: Aga Sahib

Personal life
- Born: 1901 Zadibal, Srinagar, Kashmir
- Died: July 9, 1964 Srinagar, Kashmir
- Parent: Agha Syed Hussein Rizvi (father)
- Education: Hawza 'Ilmiyya Najaf, Iraq

Religious life
- Religion: Islam
- Denomination: Shia
- Jurisprudence: Jafari

Muslim leader
- Teacher: Ali Tabatabaei
- Based in: Srinagar
- Post: Cleric Ayatollah
- Period in office: 1931–1964
- Influenced by: Ali Tabatabaei; Muhammad Hussain Naini; Abu l-Hasan al-Isfahani

Ayatollah Agha Syed Ahmed Rizvi Kashmiri , (Urdu: آیت اللہ آقا سید احمد رضوی کشمیری; c. 1901 – c. 1964) was a Shia Islamic jurist and scholar known for his religious teachings in Srinagar, Kashmir, on the Indian subcontinent.

== Early life & genealogy ==
His father, Aqa Syed Hussain Rizvi (d. 1942), and his uncle, Aqa Syed Hassan (d. 1928), were religious preachers who contributed to the development of religious gatherings in the region. Genealogical information recorded in secondary sources traces his lineage through multiple generations to Imam al‑Ridha.

== Education ==
Syed Ahmed Rizvi received his early education at home, primarily under the guidance of his father. He later traveled to Lucknow, India, where he studied with religious scholars for three years. Following this, he continued his studies in Najaf, Iraq, a prominent center of Shia Islamic scholarship. Over a period of more than two decades, he studied in religious seminaries under several notable scholars and jurists. Among those whose lectures he attended were Grand Ayatollah Mohammad Hussain Na'ini, Abul Hassan Isfahani, Syed Hussain Qommi, and Aqa Zia-ud-Din Iraqi. He ultimately attained the qualification of Ijtihad.

He also studied under jurists and scholars in Iran, Iraq, Syria, and Palestine, while pursuing the spiritual dimensions of Islam. His contemporaries included Grand Ayatollah Abul al-Qasim al-Khoei, Grand Ayatollah Asadullah Madani, Grand Ayatollah Murtazha al-Khalkhali, Grand Ayatollah Syed Ali Naqvi (Molvi Naqqan), Allameh Tabataba'i, and Ayatollah Syed Abdul Karim Rizvi Kashmiri. His spiritual education was guided by Ali Tabatabaei, a prominent figure in Shi'a gnosticism. He also studied under Ayatollah Muhammad Hussein Kampani for several years.

After returning to Kashmir, Ayatollah Syed Ahmed Rizvi focused on the dissemination of Islamic teachings and the promotion of practical Islamic education. He established a seminary, Madarsa Mohammadia, in Srinagar, Jammu & Kashmir. He regularly delivered lectures on jurisprudential topics every Thursday night and Friday morning at his residence. Sheikh Mohammad Abdullah, the then Prime Minister of Jammu and Kashmir, was reportedly influenced by Rizvi's teachings.

== supernatural powers ==
Several supernatural experiences have been attributed to Syed Ahmed Rizvi. These narratives are primarily circulated among his followers and within local religious communities, contributing to his spiritual reputation in parts of Kashmir.

One such account involves a government official, Ghulam Hussein Makhmoor, who is said to have written to Rizvi seeking religious guidance. Due to transportation and postal delays at the time, a response was not expected for several days. However, according to the story, a reply was reportedly found at Makhmoor’s bedside the same evening, with no indication of physical delivery.

In another widely circulated account, during surgery at a hospital in Srinagar, doctors were reportedly surprised by the condition of Rizvi’s internal organs. They are said to have observed damage that, in their view, should have been fatal years earlier. Following this, medical professionals allegedly visited him on multiple occasions for further examination.

Such narratives are common within the hagiographic traditions associated with Islamic scholars, but they are not supported by independent historical or medical documentation.

== Death ==
Syed Ahmed Rizvi died on Thursday, the 28th of Safar, 1384 Hijri (9 July 1964), at his residence in Srinagar. His death occurred following the conclusion of a congregational gathering held to commemorate the passing of the Prophet Muhammad and the martyrdom of the second Shi'a Imam, Imam Hasan, the son of Imam Ali.
