= Kamachal-e Bala Mahalleh =

Village in Gilan province, Iran

Kamachal-e Bala Mahalleh Persian: كماچال بالامحله
- Village
- Location within Iran
- Coordinates: 37°15′07″N 49°58′29″E
- Country: Iran
- Province: Gilan
- County: Astaneh-ye Ashrafiyeh
- District: Central
- Rural District: Kisom

Population (2016)
  - Total: 537
- Time zone: UTC+3:30 (IRST)

Kamachal-e Bala Mahalleh (Persian: كماچال بالامحله) (Note: Also romanized as Kamāchāl-e Bālā Maḩalleh; also known as Kamā Chāl, Komā Chāl, and Koma Chal Chai) is a village in Kisom Rural District of the Central District in Astaneh-ye Ashrafiyeh County, Gilan province, Iran.

== Demographics ==
=== Population ===
At the time of the 2006 National Census, the village's population was 636 in 194 households. The following census in 2011 counted 558 people in 198 households. The 2016 census measured the population of the village as 537 people in 193 households.
