= Sukhteh Kuh =

Sukhteh Kuh or Sookhteh Kooh (Persian: سوخته كوه) may refer to:

- Sukhteh Kuh, Astaneh-ye Ashrafiyeh
- Sukhteh Kuh, Lahijan
