= Parka Posht-e Yavarzadeh =

Village in Gilan province, Iran

Parka Posht-e Yavarzadeh Persian: پرکاپشت ياورزاده
- Village
- Location within Iran
- Coordinates: 37°18′50″N 49°59′27″E
- Country: Iran
- Province: Gilan
- County: Astaneh-ye Ashrafiyeh
- District: Central
- Rural District: Kurka

Population (2016)
  - Total: 617
- Time zone: UTC+3:30 (IRST)

Parka Posht-e Yavarzadeh (Persian: پرکاپشت ياورزاده) (Note: Also romanized as Parkā Posht-e Yāvarzādeh; also known as Parkabusht and Parkāposht) is a village in Kurka Rural District of the Central District in Astaneh-ye Ashrafiyeh County, Gilan province, Iran.

== Demographics ==
=== Population ===
At the time of the 2006 National Census, the village's population was 688 in 189 households. The following census in 2011 counted 651 people in 199 households. At the 2016 census, the population of the village was 617 people in 214 households.
