= Kaldeh =

Kaldeh (Persian: كلده) may refer to:

- Kaldeh, Astaneh-ye Ashrafiyeh
- Kaldeh, Fuman
