= Salestan, Astaneh-ye Ashrafiyeh =

Salestan سالستان
- Village
- Location within Iran
- Coordinates: 37°13′12″N 49°53′24″E
- Country: Iran
- Province: Gilan
- County: Astaneh-ye Ashrafiyeh
- Bakhsh: Central
- Rural District: Kisom

Population (2016)
  - Total: 118
- Time zone: UTC+3:30 (IRST)

Salestan (Persian: سالستان, also Romanized as Sālestān) is a village in Kisom Rural District, in the Central District of Astaneh-ye Ashrafiyeh County, Gilan Province, Iran. At the 2006 census, its population was 118, in 43 families. Decreased from 299 people in 2006.
