= Kashal-e Azad Sara =

Village in Gilan province, Iran

Kashal-e Azad Sara Persian: كشل آزادسرا
- Village
- Location within Iran
- Coordinates: 37°17′42″N 49°55′45″E
- Country: Iran
- Province: Gilan
- County: Astaneh-ye Ashrafiyeh
- District: Central
- Rural District: Kurka

Population (2016)
  - Total: 669
- Time zone: UTC+3:30 (IRST)

Kashal-e Azad Sara (Persian: كشل آزادسرا) (Note: Also romanized as Kashal-e Āzād Sarā; also known as Kashal) is a village in, and the capital of, Kurka Rural District in the Central District of Astaneh-ye Ashrafiyeh County, Gilan province, Iran. The previous capital of the rural district was the village of Kurka.

== Demographics ==
=== Population ===
At the time of the 2006 National Census, the village's population was 746 in 216 households. The following census in 2011 counted 733 people in 250 households. By the 2016 census, the population of the village had declined to 669 people in 236 households.
