= Masoud Poormohamad =

Iranian footballer

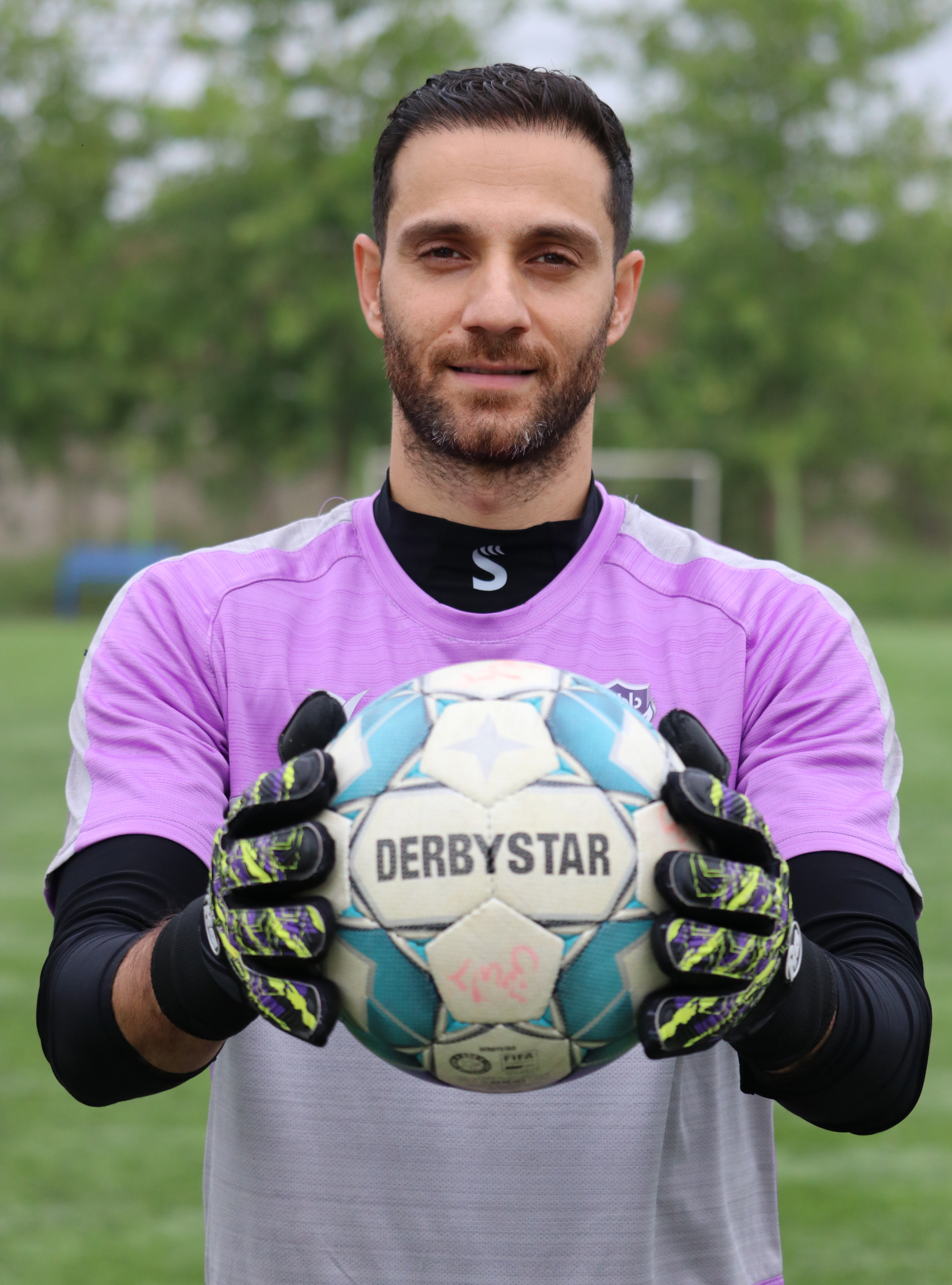

Personal information
- Full name: Masoud Poormohamad Jafar
- Date of birth: March 12, 1989 (age 37)
- Place of birth: Astaneh, Iran
- Height: 1.86 m (6 ft 1 in)
- Position: Goalkeeper

Team information
- Current team: Rahian Kermanshah
- Number: 1

Youth career
- 2002–2006: Shahrdari Lahijan

Senior career*
Years	Team	Apps	(Gls)
2006–2009	Paykan	2	(0)
2009–2010	Mehrkam Pars	25	(0)
2010–2012	Malavan	19	(0)
2013–	Rahian Kermanshah	34	(0)
- * Club domestic league appearances and goals

Masoud Poormohamad Jafar (Persian: مسعود پورمحمد, born March 12, 1989, in Astaneh, is a goalkeeper who currently plays for Rahian Kermanshah.

== Career ==
Played for Malavan before joining Rahian Kermanshah.

== Website ==
Masoud Poormohamad on Instagram
