= Mashak-e Sepahdari =

Mashak-e Sepahdari ماشک سپهداری
- Village
- Location within Iran
- Coordinates: 37°19′16″N 49°54′10″E
- Country: Iran
- Province: Gilan
- County: Astaneh-ye Ashrafiyeh
- Bakhsh: Central
- Rural District: Kurka

Population (2016)
  - Total: 370
- Time zone: UTC+3:30 (IRST)

Mashak-e Sepahdari (Persian: ماشک سپهداری, also Romanized as Māshak-e Sepahdārī; also known as Māshak, Māshak-e Şafādārī, Māshak-e Tehrānī, and Moshak) is a village in Kurka Rural District, in the Central District of Astaneh-ye Ashrafiyeh County, Gilan Province, Iran. At the 2006 census, its population was 396, in 119 families. In 2016, it had 370 people in 153 households.
