= Korkyně =

- Municipality
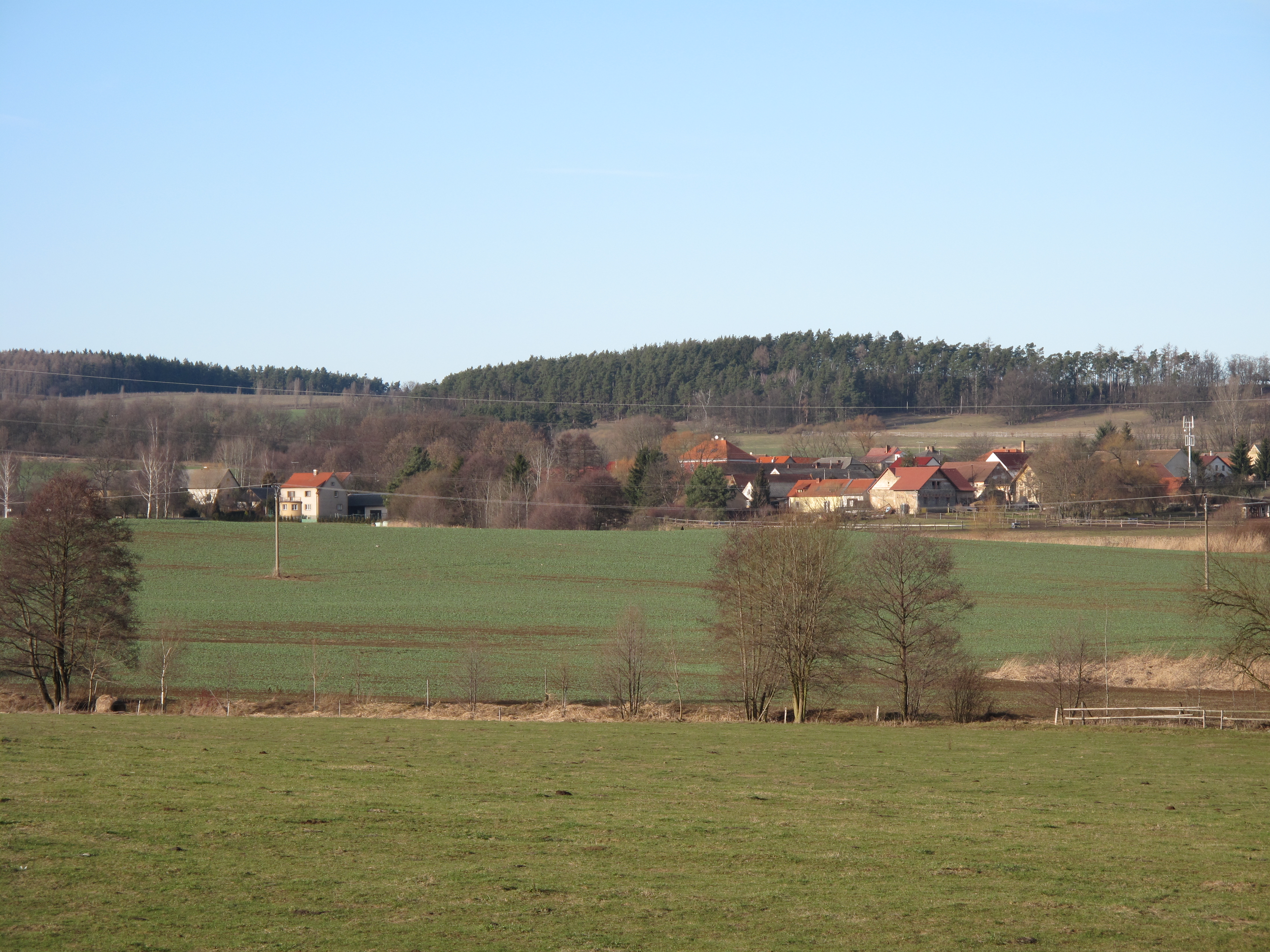
- View from the south

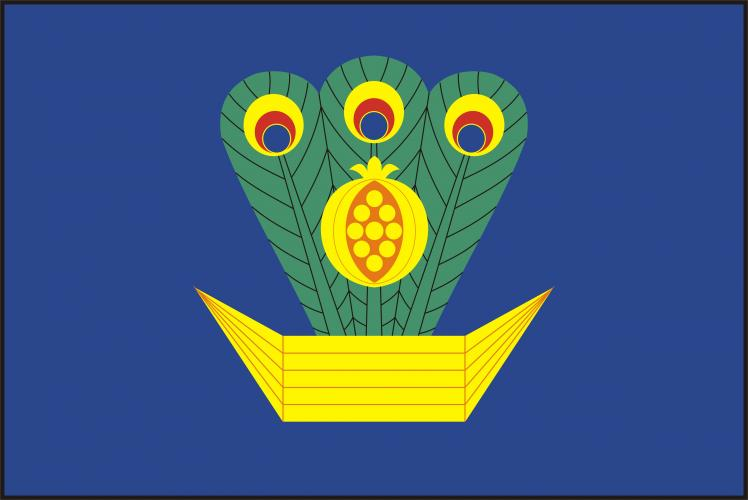
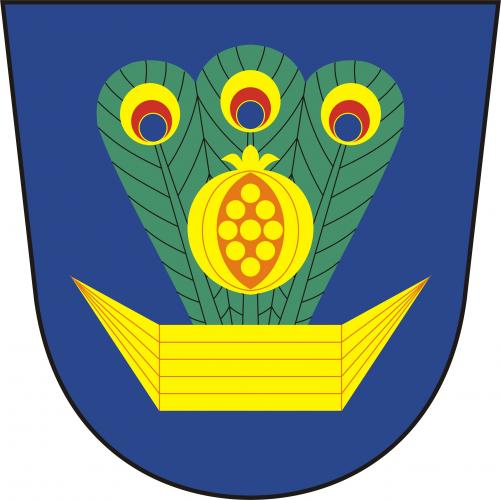
- Flag Coat of arms

- Location in the Czech Republic
- Coordinates: 49°46′50″N 14°21′5″E
- Country: Czech Republic
- Region: Central Bohemian
- District: Příbram
- First mentioned: 1316

Area
  - Total: 5.98 km^{2} (2.31 sq mi)
- Elevation: 350 m (1,150 ft)

Population (2026-01-01)
  - Total: 143
  - Density: 23.9/km^{2} (61.9/sq mi)
- Time zone: UTC+1 (CET)
  - Summer (DST): UTC+2 (CEST)
- Postal codes: 262 03, 262 06
- Website: www.korkyne.cz

Korkyně is a municipality and village in Příbram District in the Central Bohemian Region of the Czech Republic. It has about 100 inhabitants.

== Administrative division ==
Korkyně consists of two municipal parts (in brackets population according to the 2021 census):

- Korkyně (67)
- Křížov (63)

== Etymology ==
The name is derived from the surname Kůrka.

== Geography ==
Korkyně is located about 27 kilometres (17 mi) northeast of Příbram and 28 km (17 mi) south of Prague. It lies in the Benešov Uplands. The highest point is the Okrouhlík hill at 451 m (1,480 ft) above sea level.

== History ==
The first written mention of Korkyně is from 1316, when the village was the centre of a small estate.

== Demographics ==
Historical population

Year	Pop.	±%
1869	261	—
1880	291	+11.5%
1890	271	−6.9%
1900	279	+3.0%
1910	276	−1.1%

Year	Pop.	±%
1921	264	−4.3%
1930	236	−10.6%
1950	202	−14.4%
1961	171	−15.3%
1970	140	−18.1%

Year	Pop.	±%
1980	107	−23.6%
1991	100	−6.5%
2001	95	−5.0%
2011	149	+56.8%
2021	130	−12.8%

Source: Censuses

== Transport ==
There are no railways or major roads passing through the municipality.

== Sights ==
There are no protected cultural monuments in the municipality. The main landmark of the centre of Korkyně is a chapel.
