= Parka Posht-e Mehdikhani =

Village in Gilan province, Iran

Parka Posht-e Mehdikhani Persian: پرکاپشت مهدی خانی
- Village
- Location within Iran
- Coordinates: 37°18′16″N 49°58′19″E
- Country: Iran
- Province: Gilan
- County: Astaneh-ye Ashrafiyeh
- District: Central
- Rural District: Kurka

Population (2016)
  - Total: 835
- Time zone: UTC+3:30 (IRST)

Parka Posht-e Mehdikhani (Persian: پرکاپشت مهدی خانی) (Note: Also romanized as Parkā Posht-e Mehdīkhānī; also known as Mehdīkhānī and Parkā Posht) is a village in Kurka Rural District of the Central District in Astaneh-ye Ashrafiyeh County, Gilan province, Iran.

== Demographics ==
=== Population ===
At the time of the 2006 National Census, the village's population was 818 in 221 households. The following census in 2011 counted 832 people in 274 households. At the 2016 census, the population of the village was 835 people in 280 households.
