= Seyqal Sara =

Seyqal Sara (Persian: صيقل سرا) may refer to:

- Seyqal Sara, Astaneh-ye Ashrafiyeh
- Seyqal Sara, Rezvanshahr
