= Zir Deh =

Zir Deh (Persian: زيرده) may refer to:

- Zir Deh, Astaneh-ye Ashrafiyeh, Gilan Province
- Zir Deh, Rasht, Gilan Province
- Zir Deh, Kohgiluyeh and Boyer-Ahmad
