= Panchah =

Village in Gilan province, Iran

Panchah Gilaki: پینچه Persian: پنچاه
- Village
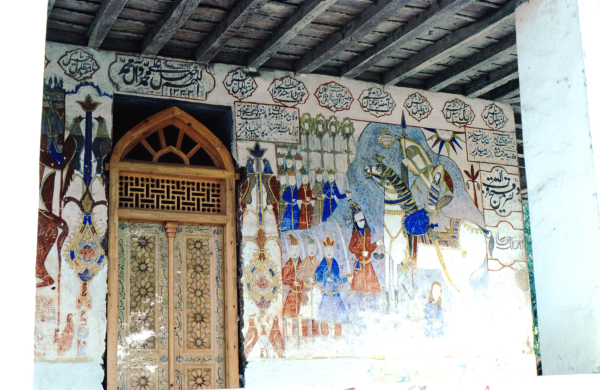

- Location within Iran
- Coordinates: 37°14′08″N 49°56′29″E
- Country: Iran
- Province: Gilan
- County: Astaneh-ye Ashrafiyeh
- District: Central
- Rural District: Kisom

Population (2016)
  - Total: 900
- Time zone: UTC+3:30 (IRST)

Panchah (Gilaki: پینچه, romanized: Pinche; Persian: پنچاه, romanized: Panchāh) (Note: Also romanized as Penchah.) is a village in Kisom Rural District of the Central District in Astaneh-ye Ashrafiyeh County, Gilan province, Iran.

== Name ==
The local Gilaki name of the village is پینچه (Pinche). The modern Persian name is پنچاه (Panchāh), also rendered as Penchah.

== Demographics ==
=== Language ===
It is an ancestrally Gilaki speaking village.

=== Population ===
At the time of the 2006 National Census, the village's population was 799 in 253 households. The following census in 2011 counted 890 people in 113 households. The 2016 census measured the population of the village as 900 people in 318 households.

== Historical architecture ==
Panchah is home to the Buq'eh Sayyid Muhammad b. Imam Ja'far Sadiq, a local shrine documented in an architectural survey of imamzadehs in Iran.
