= Kashal-e Azad Mahalleh =

Kashal-e Azad Mahalleh كشل آزاد محله
- Village
- Location within Iran
- Coordinates: 37°17′00″N 49°56′00″E
- Country: Iran
- Province: Gilan
- County: Astaneh-ye Ashrafiyeh
- Bakhsh: Central
- Rural District: Kurka

Population (2016)
  - Total: 229
- Time zone: UTC+3:30 (IRST)

Kashal-e Azad Mahalleh (Persian: كشل آزاد محله, also Romanized as Kashal-e Āzād Maḩalleh) is a village in Kurka Rural District, in the Central District of Astaneh-ye Ashrafiyeh County, Gilan Province, Iran. At the 2016 census, its population was 229, in 84 families.
