= Sukhteh Kuh, Astaneh-ye Ashrafiyeh =

Sukhteh Kuh سوخته كوه
- Village
- Location within Iran
- Coordinates: 37°20′32″N 50°00′27″E
- Country: Iran
- Province: Gilan
- County: Astaneh-ye Ashrafiyeh
- Bakhsh: Central
- Rural District: Dehshal

Population (2016)
  - Total: 410
- Time zone: UTC+3:30 (IRST)

Sukhteh Kuh (Persian: سوخته كوه, also Romanized as Sūkhteh Kūh and Sookhteh Kooh) is a village in Dehshal Rural District, in the Central District of Astaneh-ye Ashrafiyeh County, Gilan Province, Iran. At the 2006 census, its population was 459, in 135 families. In 2016, its population was 410, in 150 households.
