= Seyqal Sara, Astaneh-ye Ashrafiyeh =

Seyqal Sara صيقل سرا
- Village
- Location within Iran
- Coordinates: 37°17′31″N 50°01′40″E
- Country: Iran
- Province: Gilan
- County: Astaneh-ye Ashrafiyeh
- Bakhsh: Central
- Rural District: Dehshal

Population (2016)
  - Total: 50
- Time zone: UTC+3:30 (IRST)

Seyqal Sara (Persian: صيقل سرا, also Romanized as Şeyqal Sarā) is a village in Dehshal Rural District, in the Central District of Astaneh-ye Ashrafiyeh County, Gilan Province, Iran. At the 2016 census, its population was 50, in 19 families. Down from 67 people in 2006.
