= Birboneh-ye Pain =

Birboneh-ye Pain بيربنه پایين
- Village
- Location within Iran
- Coordinates: 37°13′06″N 49°53′29″E
- Country: Iran
- Province: Gilan
- County: Astaneh-ye Ashrafiyeh
- Bakhsh: Central
- Rural District: Kisom

Population (2016)
  - Total: 104
- Time zone: UTC+3:30 (IRST)

Birboneh-ye Pain (Persian: بيربنه پائين, also Romanized as Bīrboneh-ye Pā’īn and Bīr Boneh-ye Pā’īn; also known as Bīr Benah, Bīr Boneh, and Mīr Boneh) is a village in Kisom Rural District, in the Central District of Astaneh-ye Ashrafiyeh County, Gilan Province, Iran. At the 2006 census, its population was 145, in 46 families. In 2016, its population was 104, in 47 households.
