= Islamic sciences =

Religious sciences in Islam

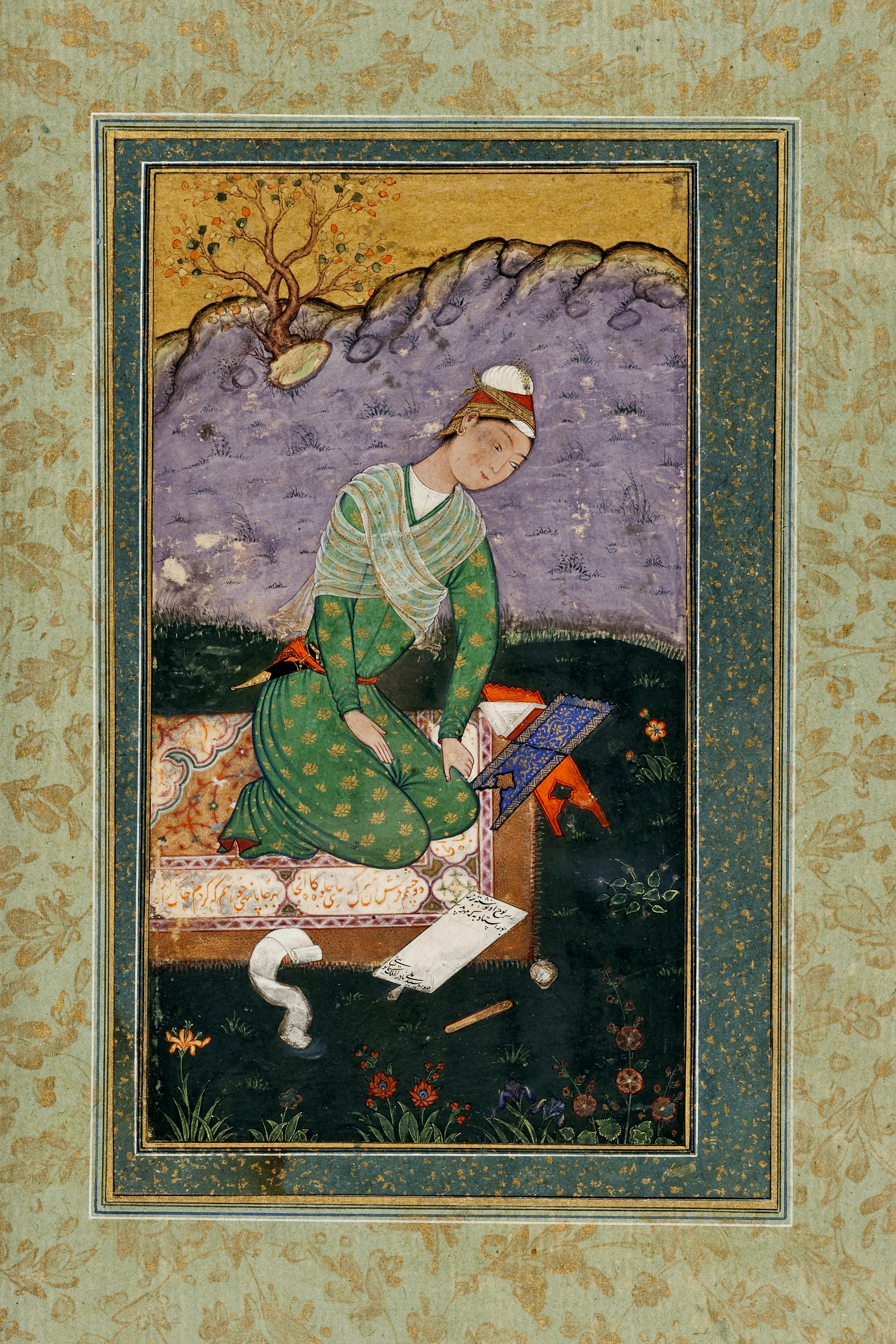
A scholar writing a commentary on the Qur'an during the reign of the Mughal Emperor Shah Jahan (1592–1666)

The Islamic sciences (Arabic: علوم الدين, romanized: ʿulūm al-dīn, lit. 'the sciences of religion') are a set of traditionally defined religious sciences practiced by Islamic scholars (ʿulamāʾ), aimed at the construction and interpretation of Islamic religious knowledge.

== Different sciences ==
These sciences include:

- ʿIlm al-fiqh: Islamic jurisprudence
- ʿIlm al-ḥadīth: the study of the authenticity of Prophetic traditions or hadith
  - ʿIlm al-rijāl: the biographical study of hadith transmitters with the purpose of evaluating their trustworthiness
- ʿIlm al-kalām (sometimes also called uṣūl al-dīn, "the roots of religion"): speculative theology / and some reasoning
- ʿIlm al-lugha: Arabic grammar
- ʿIlm al-tafsīr: interpretation of the Qur'an
  - ʿIlm al-naskh: the study of abrogation (parts of the Qur'an which supersede or cancel other parts)
- ʿIlm al-tajwīd: rules for the proper recitation of the Qur'an
  - ʿIlm al-qirāʾāt: on the various ways in which the Qur'an can be recited
- ʿIlm ākhir al-zamān: Islamic eschatology (on the end times and the Day of Resurrection (yawm al-qiyāma))
- ʿIlm al-akhlaq: moral ethics was an important subject for Muslim intellectuals in medieval Islam.

== In Shiʿi Islam ==
Shiʿi Islam Many of the same subjects are studied at Shiʿi seminaries (known as hawza), but there are some differences:

- Falsafa (Islamic philosophy)
- Fiqh (jurisprudence)
- Ilm al-Hadith (traditions)
- Ilm al-Kalam (theology)
- 'Ilm ar-Rijal (evaluation of biographies)
- ʿIrfān (Islamic mysticism)
- Manṭiq (Logic)
- Lugha (language studies)
- Tafsir al-Qur'an (interpretation of the Qur'an)
- Tarikh (history)
- Ulum al-Qur'an (Qur'an sciences)
- Usul al-Fiqh (principles of jurisprudence)

== According to Abu Hamid Al-Ghazali ==
The celebrated Islamic scholar Abu Hamid Al-Ghazali wrote on Islamic sciences in his well known book The Revival of Religious Sciences (Ihya `ulum al‑din). He argued that a Muslim has a religious obligation (wajib) to know whatever aspects of religious science are necessary for them to obey Shari'ah in doing whatever work it is they do. So, for example, someone working in animal husbandry should know rules concerning zakat; a merchant "doing business in an usurious environment", should learn rules about riba so as "to effectively avoid it". Sciences whose knowledge is wajib kifa'i (must be known by some people in society, although once enough people have met the obligation, the rest of the population is relieved of it).

Al‑Ghazali considers wajib kifa'i religious sciences to be classified into four groups:

1. Usul (principles; i.e. the Qur’an, the sunnah, ijma` or consensus and the traditions of the Prophet's companions)
2. Furu` (secondary matters; i.e. problems of jurisprudence, ethics and mystical experience)
3. Introductory studies (Arabic grammar, syntax, etc.)
4. Complementary studies (recitation and interpretation of the Qur’an, study of the principles of jurisprudence, `ilm al‑rijal or biographical research about narrators of Islamic traditions etc.)

Al‑Ghazzali asserts that not all religious sciences are "praiseworthy" (mahmud), as some proport to be "oriented towards the Shari'ah but actually deviate from its teachings". These are known as "undesirable" (madhmum).

== See also ==
- List of contemporary Islamic scholars
- Ulama
- Islamic advice literature
