= Ali Tabatabaei =

Iranian scholar and mystic (1866–1947)

Ayatollah Allameh Sayyed Ali Aqa Qazi Tabatabaei
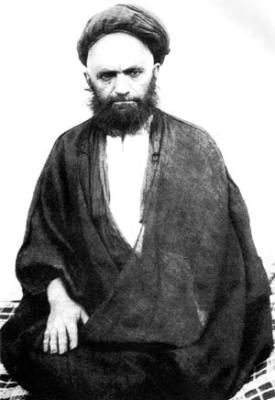
- Sayyed Ali Qazi

Personal life
- Born: 1866 Tabriz, Sublime State of Iran
- Died: 8 February 1947 (aged 80) Najaf, Kingdom of Iraq
- Resting place: Wadi-us-Salaam, Najaf
- Main interest(s): Islamic philosophy, jurisprudence, mysticism

Religious life
- Religion: Islam
- Denomination: Shia
- Jurisprudence: Jaʽfari
- Creed: Twelver

Muslim leader
- Disciple of: Mirza Mousa Tabrizi, Muhammad Ali Qarcheh Daghi, Sayyed Hosein Qazi, Mirza Muhammad Taqi Tabrizi, Muhammad Kazem Khorasani ( Akhoond Khorasani), Mirza Fathollah Shariati, Mirza Hosein Tehrani, Sheykh Muhammad Kazem Yazdi, Fazel Sharabyani, Sheykh Muhammad Bahari, Sayyed Ahmad karbalaei

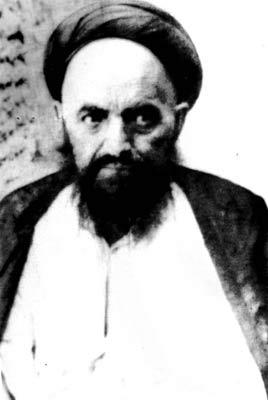

Ali Qazi Tabatabai (Persian: علی قاضی طباطبای), also known as "Allamah Qadi" and "Ayatollah Qazi" (1866–1947 CE; 1285–1366 AH), was an Iranian alim (Islamic scholar) and mystic. He was the son of Husseyn and was born in Tabriz, Iran. He was born on 29 April 1866 in Tabriz. His father Sayyed Hosein Qazi was a prominent pupil of the grand Mirza Shirazi. His maternal grandfather, Mirza Mohsen, was a great jurist.

== Teachers ==
He learned under the supervision of great scholars. Some of them were: Mirza Mousa Tabrizi, Muhammad Ali Qarcheh Daghi, Sayyed Hosein Qazi, Mirza Muhammad Taqi Tabrizi. Muhammad Kazem Khorasani ( Akhoond Khorasani), Mirza Fathollah Shariati, Mirza Hosein Tehrani, Sheykh Muhammad Kazem Yazdi, Fazel Sharabyani, Sheykh Muhammad Bahari and Sayyed Ahmad Karbalaei.

== Students ==
Some of his Students included: Allameh Sayyed Muhammad Hossein Tabatabaei, Sayyed Muhammad Elahi Tabrizi, Sayyed Hasan Masqati, Muhammad Taqi Amuli, Sheykh Abbas Qouchani, Muhammad Taqi Bahjat, Sayyed Yousef Hakim, Sayyed Muhammad Hoseini Hamadani, Sayyed Abdolhossein Dastgheib Shirazi, Sheykh Hasan Ali Nejabat Shirazi, Sayyed Muhammad Hadi Milani, Allameh Muhammad Rez Muzaffar, second Qazi r.a(Qazi saani r.a) Sayyed Ahmad Rizvi Kashmiri, Sayyed Abul Ali Sabzevari, Mirza Ali Qaravi Aliyari, Sayyed Shahab Al Din Marashi Najafi, Sayyed Abul Qasim Khoei, Hajj Sheykh Abul Fazl Khansari, Sayyed Hashem Haddad and Sayyed Abdul Karim Keshmiri.

== His Teachers in Mysticism ==
His teachers in Shi'i irfan were Ayatollah Sayyed Ahmed Karbala'i (d. 1913) and Sheikh Mohammad Bahari, who in turn were the students of Mirza Mulla Hossein Qulli Hamadani. Mulla Qulli was a student of Ayatollah Haj Sayyed Ali Shushtari.

== Islamic Studies ==
Sayyed Ali Qadi started his Islamic studies in his hometown, Tabriz. There, he studied under his father Sayyed Hosein Qazi as well as Mirza Mousa Tabrizi and Muhammad Ali Qaracheh Daghi. Then around 1895 he travelled to Najaf to continue his higher studies and to attain the status of Ijtihad. In Najaf, he studied under Muhammad Kazem Khorasani ( Akhoond Khorasani) and Mirza Fathollah Shariati.

=== Authority (Ijtihad) ===
He received the degree of authority or Ijtihad when he was 27 years old. He also memorised nearly 40,000 Arabic words.

== Characters ==
The description of his characters is not easy. We just refer to some of his mystical aspect in summary.

=== Mystical behavior ===
Allameh Tabatabaei about the Mystical character of Aqa Ali Qazi says that: he sometimes was appeared between us while sometimes he was absent and disappeared.

=== Night prayers ===
Sayyed Ali Aqa Qazi emphasized more on the night praying. He already advised his pupils to the night praying. Allameh Tabatabaei says that: he told me if you want both of the world and after world, you have to exercise the night praying.

== Works ==
He wrote several books, including a partially completed tafsir of the Qur'an, which is a commentary up to verse 91 of Surah al-An’am. He wrote some notes and commentary. Some of them are as follows:

- Incomplete explanation on Samat Dua
- Correction of the book of Ershad
- Notes on fotuhat and fosus
- Commentary on The Holy Quran
- Mystical letters and recommendations

== Death ==
The grand mystic Allameh Aqa Ali Qazi Tabatabaei died in 1947 in Wadi-us-Salaam Cemetery in Najaf.

== See also ==
=== External links ===
- About Sayyed Ali Qazi (In persian).Seyyed Ali Ghazi Tabatabaei
- Seyyed Ali Ghazi tabatabaei

=== Internal link ===
- Ja’far Mojtahedi
