= Dehshal Rural District =

Rural district in Gilan province, Iran

Dehshal Rural District Persian: دهستان دهشال
- Rural District
- Location within Iran
- Coordinates: 37°19′N 50°02′E
- Country: Iran
- Province: Gilan
- County: Astaneh-ye Ashrafiyeh
- District: Central

Population (2016)
  - Total: 7,254
- Time zone: UTC+3:30 (IRST)

Dehshal Rural District (Persian: دهستان دهشال) is in the Central District of Astaneh-ye Ashrafiyeh County, Gilan province, Iran.

== Demographics ==
=== Population ===
At the time of the 2006 National Census, the rural district's population was 9,125 in 2,783 households. There were 8,195 inhabitants in 2,841 households at the following census of 2011. The 2016 census measured the population of the rural district as 7,254 in 2,784 households. The most populous of its 17 villages was Sheshkal, with 1,140 people.

=== Other villages in the rural district ===
- Amir Hendeh
- Dakhel
- Dargah
- Dehshal
- Fushazdeh
- Karsidan
- Kelid Sar
- Labeshka
- Leshkam
- Nowshar
- Poshal
- Seyqal Sara
- Sukhteh Kuh
- Tasandeh
- Tazehabad-e Fushazdeh
- Zir Deh
