= Tajan, Gilan =

Tajan تجن
- Village
- Location within Iran
- Coordinates: 37°14′15″N 49°53′30″E
- Country: Iran
- Province: Gilan
- County: Astaneh-ye Ashrafiyeh
- Bakhsh: Central
- Rural District: Kisom

Population (2016)
  - Total: 214
- Time zone: UTC+3:30 (IRST)

Tajan (Persian: تجن; also known as Tadzhin and Tājīn) is a village in Kisom Rural District, in the Central District of Astaneh-ye Ashrafiyeh County, Gilan Province, Iran. At the 2006 census, its population was 282, in 94 families. In 2016, its population was 214, in 96 households.
