= Kurka (surname) =

Kurka (feminine: Kurková) is a Czech surname. It is a diminutive of a Slavic word kura, meaning 'hen'. Kurka is also an Anglicised form of the surname Kůrka. Notable people with the surname include:

- Andrew Kurka (born 1992), American Paralympic alpine skier
- Christopher Kurka, American politician
- Jiří Kurka (born 1994), Czech ice hockey player
- Karolína Kurková (born 1984), Czech model
- Marie Kurková (born 1996), Czech volleyball player
- Petra Kurková (born 1973), Czech deaf alpine skier
- Robert Kurka (1921–1957), American composer
