= Kisom Rural District =

Rural district in Gilan province, Iran

Kisom Rural District Persian: دهستان كيسم
- Rural District
- Location within Iran
- Coordinates: 37°14′N 49°55′E
- Country: Iran
- Province: Gilan
- County: Astaneh-ye Ashrafiyeh
- District: Central
- Established: 1987
- Capital: Kisom

Population (2016)
  - Total: 8,935
- Time zone: UTC+3:30 (IRST)

Kisom Rural District (Persian: دهستان كيسم) is in the Central District of Astaneh-ye Ashrafiyeh County, Gilan province, Iran. Its capital is the village of Kisom.

== Demographics ==
=== Population ===
At the time of the 2006 National Census, the rural district's population was 10,294 in 3,230 households. There were 9,317 inhabitants in 3,248 households at the following census of 2011. The 2016 census measured the population of the rural district as 8,935 in 3,334 households. The most populous of its 18 villages was Tajan Gukeh, with 1,809 people.

=== Other villages in the rural district ===
- Amir Hendeh
- Amshal
- Bazan
- Birboneh-ye Bala
- Birboneh-ye Pain
- Kaldeh
- Kamachal-e Bala Mahalleh
- Kamachal-e Pain Mahalleh
- Kisom Jukol
- Niaku
- Panchah
- Rahijan
- Salestan
- Siah Kucheh
- Taham
- Tajan
