= Chahardeh Rural District =

Rural district in Gilan province, Iran

Chahardeh Rural District Persian: دهستان چهارده
- Rural District
- Location within Iran
- Coordinates: 37°13′N 49°49′E
- Country: Iran
- Province: Gilan
- County: Astaneh-ye Ashrafiyeh
- District: Central
- Established: 1995
- Capital: Shirkuh-e Chahardeh

Population (2016)
  - Total: 3,665
- Time zone: UTC+3:30 (IRST)

Chahardeh Rural District (Persian: دهستان چهارده) is in the Central District of Astaneh-ye Ashrafiyeh County, Gilan province, Iran. Its capital is the village of Shirkuh-e Chahardeh.

== Demographics ==
=== Population ===
At the time of the 2006 National Census, the rural district's population was 4,214 in 1,392 households. There were 3,776 inhabitants in 1,327 households at the following census of 2011. The 2016 census measured the population of the rural district as 3,665 in 1,430 households. The most populous of its eight villages was Shirkuh-e Chahardeh, with 882 people.

=== Other villages in the rural district ===
- Gachara-ye Chahardeh
- Kacha-ye Chahardeh
- Kateh-ye Shast-e Abadan
- Kateh-ye Shast-e Abadan-e Chahardeh
- Khalsha
- Khalsha-ye Chahardeh
- Tazehabad-e Marzian
