= Ascesis =

Scientific classification
- Kingdom: Animalia
- Phylum: Arthropoda
- Class: Insecta
- Order: Coleoptera
- Suborder: Polyphaga
- Infraorder: Elateriformia
- Family: Elateridae
- Subfamily: Dendrometrinae
- Genus: Ascesis; Candeze, 1863

Species
- Ascesis australis (Candeze, 1863); Ascesis campyloides (Candeze, 1897); Ascesis impurus (Germar, 1848); Ascesis mastersii (W.j. Macleay, 1872); Ascesis testaceus (Elston, 1930)

Genus of beetles

Ascesis is a genus of click beetles in the subfamily Dendrometrinae. Species are found in Australia.
