= Jiří Kurka =

Czech ice hockey player

- Born: March 31, 1994 (age 30); Czech Republic
- Height: 6 ft 0 in (183 cm)
- Weight: 180 lb (82 kg; 12 st 12 lb)
- Position: Defense
- Shoots: Right
- Czech team: BK Mladá Boleslav
- Playing career: 2014–present

Jiří Kurka (born March 31, 1994) is a Czech professional ice hockey player. He is currently playing for BK Mladá Boleslav of the Czech Extraliga.

Kurka made his Czech Extraliga debut playing with BK Mladá Boleslav during the 2014-15 Czech Extraliga season.
