= Tajin (comedian) =

Japanese comedian, reporter, and radio personality

- タージン
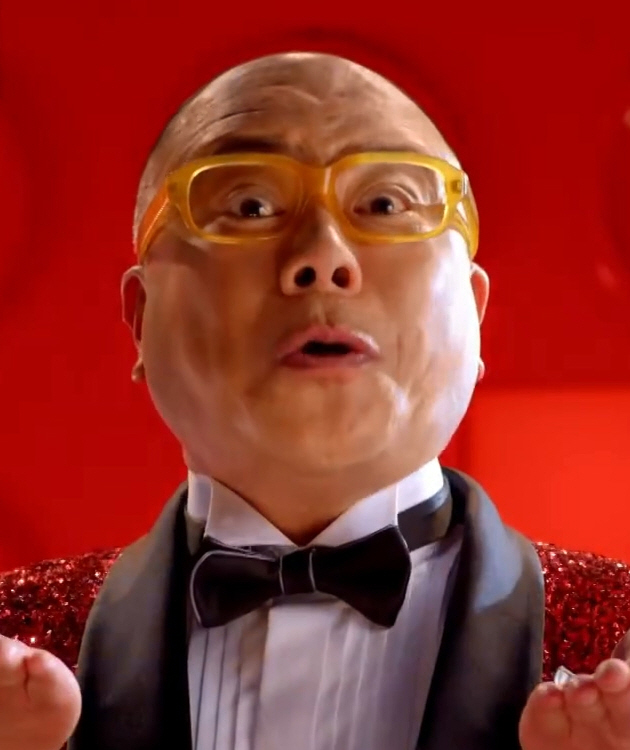
- 2017
- Born: Yuzo Ishikawa; June 18, 1962 (age 64); Asahi-ku, Osaka, Osaka Prefecture, Japan
- Occupations: Comedian, reporter, radio personality
- Years active: 1981 -
- Agent: Wako Production

Yuzo Ishikawa (石川 雄三, Ishikawa Yūzō; born June 18, 1962, in Asahi-ku, Osaka, Osaka Prefecture, Japan), better known as Tajin (タージン, Tājin), is a Japanese comedian, reporter, and radio personality who is represented by the talent agency, Wako Promotion.

Tajin is an active reporter mainly in the Kansai region, by the nicknames Kansai No. 1 Reporter (関西No.1リポーター, Kansai Nanbā 1 Ripōtā) and Location God (King-Emperor) (ロケの神様（王様・帝王）, Roke no Kamisama (Ōsama Teiō)).

== Filmography ==
=== TV series ===
Current

Title	Network	Notes
Tājin no Omoshiro Chindō-chū!	Tabi Channel, Sun TV	
Kyō-kan TV	RKB	Biweekly Tuesday
Tanken! Kyūshū	RKB	Irregular
NFL Chūkei	Gaora	Irregular
One Love Shopping	Keiretsu Kakukyoku, Dokuritsu U-kyoku, BS, CS	Irregular
Matsumoto Hitoshi no na Hanashi	Fuji TV	Irregular
PS San-sei	CTV	Irregular
PS Junkin	CTV	Irregular
Tsūhan Ōkoku	Minpō BS Kakukyoku	Irregular

Past

Title	Network	Notes
Lonloba!	TBS	
Kyō Pachida-i-su-ki	KBS	
Toppimo Night	KBS	
Kon'ya wa Emi: Go!!	MBS	Irregular
Tsūkai! Everyday	KTV	
Ja Ikeru Makuson	MBS	
Otona no e Hon	Sun	
Shūkan!! Wide ABCDE su	ABC	
Arabiki Dan	TBS	
Yū Doki tsu!	TVN	

=== Radio series ===
Current

Title	Network	Notes
Tajin Hitomi no Shūmatsu Kitā! Jin	MBS Radio	
Tajin no Snack Yeah!	ABC Radio	

Past

Year	Network	Notes
Emiko Kaminuma no Kokoro Seiten	ABC Radio	
Genki Ichiban!! Makoto Ashizawa desu	ABC Radio	
Suzume Tajin Yuririn no Neverland	ABC Radio	
Fūjin! Raijin! Tajin desu!	ABC Radio	
Tājin no Kono Yubi to Mare	ABC Radio	
Sato Yoshi Tajin no Yoru wa Kore Kara	KBS Radio	
Dandy Express	ABC Radio	Friday

=== Podcasts ===
Title	Notes
American Football! Tajin	

=== Store broadcasting ===
Title	Notes
Sun Chain Broadcasting Station	Sun Chain

=== Films ===
Year	Title	Role	Notes
2014	Entaku Kokko, Hito Natsu no Imagine	Reporter	
