= Kurka Rural District =

Rural district in Gilan province, Iran

Kurka Rural District Persian: دهستان كوركا
- Rural District
- Location within Iran
- Coordinates: 37°18′N 49°56′E
- Country: Iran
- Province: Gilan
- County: Astaneh-ye Ashrafiyeh
- District: Central
- Established: 1987
- Capital: Kashal-e Azad Sara

Population (2016)
  - Total: 10,250
- Time zone: UTC+3:30 (IRST)

Kurka Rural District (Persian: دهستان كوركا) is in the Central District of Astaneh-ye Ashrafiyeh County, Gilan province, Iran. Its capital is the village of Kashal-e Azad Sara. The previous capital of the rural district was the former village of Kurka.

== Demographics ==
=== Population ===
At the time of the 2006 National Census, the rural district's population was 12,936 in 3,729 households. There were 10,374 inhabitants in 3,436 households at the following census of 2011. The 2016 census measured the population of the rural district as 10,250 in 3,602 households. The most populous of its 22 villages was Chur Kuchan, with 1,271 people.

=== Other villages in the rural district ===
- Chushadestan
- Estakhr-e Bijar
- Gowhardan
- Gurab Javar
- Ishliki
- Jeseydan
- Ju Posht
- Kashal-e Azad Mahalleh
- Khoshkarvandan
- Kinchah
- Lafut-e Bala
- Lafut-e Pain
- Mardomkadeh
- Mashak-e Sepahdari
- Mashak-e Tehranchi
- Nazok Sara
- Parka Posht-e Mehdikhani
- Parka Posht-e Yavarzadeh
- Shadbondari
- Tamchal
