= Irfan =

Islamic term for gnosis

In Islam, irfan (Arabic/Persian/Urdu: عرفان; Turkish: İrfan), literally 'knowledge, awareness, wisdom', is a concept in Islamic mysticism akin to gnosis, or spiritual knowledge.

== Sunni mysticism ==
According to the founder of the Qadiriyya Sufi order, Abdul Qadir Gilani, irfan is the acknowledgement of God's unity. This acceptance is achieved by studying under Islamic scholars who give insight on the internal meanings of Islamic rituals, such as the salah. Reflection upon the practice of Islam with the guidance of respected Islamic scholars is a form of "nearness to God".

== Shi'ite mysticism ==
Among the best-known modern Shia proponents of irfan were Usuli theologians Muhammad Husayn Tabatabai, Ruhollah Khomeini, Mohammad-Taqi Bahjat Foumani, Hassan Hassanzadeh Amoli, and Ali Tabatabaei.

== See also ==
- Hikmah
- Irfan (name)
- Ma'rifa
- Hikmat al-Muta'aliyah
