= Kashal, Siahkal =

Kashal كشل
- Village
- Location within Iran
- Coordinates: 37°05′07″N 49°51′42″E
- Country: Iran
- Province: Gilan
- County: Siahkal
- Bakhsh: Central
- Rural District: Tutaki

Population (2006)
  - Total: 67
- Time zone: UTC+3:30 (IRST)
  - Summer (DST): UTC+4:30 (IRDT)

Kashal (Persian: كشل) is a village in Tutaki Rural District, in the Central District of Siahkal County, Gilan Province, Iran. At the 2006 census, its population was 67, in 19 families.
