= Islamic Azad University, Lahijan Branch =

- دانشگاه آزاد اسلامي واحد لاهيجان
- Type: Private
- Established: 1988
- President: Dr. Soheil Shokri
- Students: 9275
- Location: Lahijan, Gilan, Iran
- Campus: Urban
- Athletics: ? teams
- Website: www.liau.ac.ir/%20http://www.liau.ac.ir/

The Islamic Azad University, Lahijan Branch (also known as Azad University of Lahijan) is a branch of the Islamic Azad University system.

The university was established in 1988 by some professors of Tehran University of Medical Sciences include Dr. Mir Mozafar Masoumi who was the first President of the university. So far 16000 students graduated from university.

== Faculties ==
- Faculty of Engineering
  - Architecture Engineering (B.Sc. & A.Sc.)
  - Architecture Technology (B.Ac)
  - Auto Mechanics - Vehicle Engineering (B.Ac.)
  - Cartography Technology (B.Ac)
  - Cartography - Geodesy (A.Sc.)
  - Chemical Engineering (B.Sc.)
  - Civil Engineering (M.Sc., B.Sc. & A.Sc.)
  - Civil Technology (B.Ac. & A.Sc.)
  - Computer Engineering (B.Sc. & A.Sc. & PhD)
  - Computer Technology (B.Ac. & A.Sc.)
  - Control Engineering (B.Sc.)
  - Electronics Engineering (M.Sc., B.Sc. & A.Sc. & PhD)
  - Electronics Technology (B.Ac. & A.Sc.)
  - Electrical Power Technology (M.Sc., B.Sc. & A.Sc.)
  - Mechanical Engineering (A.Sc., M.Sc., B.Sc. & PhD)
  - Mechatronics Engineering (M.Sc.)
  - Medical Radiation Engineering (B.Sc.)
  - Mining Engineering - Extraction (B.Sc. & A.Sc.)
  - Mining Engineering - Exploration (B.Sc. & A.Sc.)
  - Metallurgy Engineering (B.Sc.)
  - Optics Engineering - Laser (B.Sc.)
  - Robotic Engineering (B.Sc.)
- Faculty of Math & Science
  - Applied Math (M.Sc & B.Sc)
  - Computer Science (B.Sc)
  - Math Science (B.Sc)
- Faculty of Basic Science
  - Applied Chemistry (B.Sc)
  - Cell Biology - Molecular - Bio-tech (B.Sc)
  - Cell Biology - Molecular (B.Sc)
  - Chemistry (B.Sc)
  - Geology (B.Sc)
  - Geology - Petrology (M.Sc)
  - Geology - Economic Geology (M.Sc)
  - Marine Biology (B.Sc)
  - Microbiology (M.Sc)
  - Physics (B.Sc)
- Faculty of Natural Resources
  - Forestry (M.Sc & B.Sc)
  - Environmental Science (M.Sc & B.Ac)
  - Fisheries Science (B.Ac)
  - Natural Resources - Fisheries Science (M.Sc & B.Sc)
  - Natural Resources - Forestry (B.Sc)
  - Natural Resources - Environmental Engineering (B.Sc)
  - Natural Resources - Aquatic Reproduction and Aquaculture (M.Sc)
  - Processed Fishery Products (M.Sc)
- Faculty of Agriculture
  - Agriculture Engineering - Food Science and Technology (B.Sc)
  - Agriculture - Medic Plants (B.Sc)
  - Agriculture Engineering - Cultivation (M.Sc)
  - Agricultural Engineering - Water (B.Sc)
  - Engineering Agriculture - Agronomy (B.Sc)
  - Food Science and Technology (B.Ac)
  - Food Technology (A.Sc)
- Other departments
  - Accounting
  - English - Literature
  - Islamic Education
  - Jurisprudence
  - Nursing
  - Persian Literature
  - Physical Education
  - Psychology
  - Teacher Education
