= Mohammad-Taqi Bahjat Foumani =

Iranian Grand Ayatollah (1916-2009)

Marja' Mohammad-Taqi Bahjat Foumani
- محمد تقی بهجت فومنی
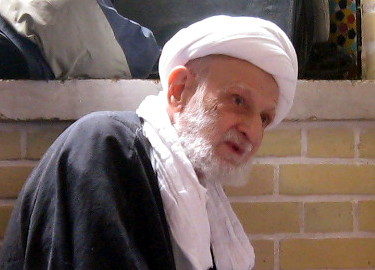
- Grand Ayatollah Bahjat Foumani
- Title: Grand Ayatollah

Personal life
- Born: 24 August 1916 Fouman, Iran
- Died: 17 May 2009 (aged 92) Qom, Iran
- Resting place: Fatima Masumeh Shrine
- Other name: Ayatollah Taqi Bahjat
- Website: The Center for Compilation and Publication of the Works of Grand Ayatollah Bahjat

Religious life
- Religion: Shia Islam
- Sect: Twelver

Senior posting
- Based in: Qom
- Post: Marja'
- Period in office: 1916–2009
- Students: Morteza Motahhari; Abdollah Javadi-Amoli; Mohammad Mohammadi Gilani; Mohammad Yazdi; Ahmad Azari Qomi; Mohammad-Taqi Mesbah-Yazdi; Mahdi Hosseini Rohani; Azizollah Khoshvaght; Zaynolabideen Ghorbani

Grand Ayatollah Mohammad-Taqi Bahjat Foumani (Persian: محمدتقی بهجت فومنی) (24 August 1916 – 17 May 2009) was an Iranian Twelver Shia Marja'.

== Biography ==
Ayatullah Mohammad-Taqi was born on 24 August 1916 in the Fouman, Gilan province in the north of Iran. Mohammad's mother died when he was at an early age and he lived with his father. Bahjat's father sold cookies to gain as income. He started his primary education from Fouman. At the age 14, he went to Karbala then Najaf, Iraq to continue his advanced education. After returning to Iran on 1945, he resided in Qom and at the Qom Seminary, Mohammad-Taqi taught jurisprudence and theology.

== Teachers ==
While he lived in Najaf, he was a student of Abu l-Hasan al-Isfahani, Shaikh Muhammad Kadhim Shirazi, Mirza Hussein Naini, Agha Zia Addin Araghi, and Shaikh Muhammad Hussain al-Gharawi. Also, Ali Tabatabaei (known as Ayatollah Qadhi) was his teacher in spirituality and gnosticism. In Qom, he attended the class of Ayatollah Seyyed Hossein Borujerdi.

== Students ==
He had many students including: Morteza Motahhari, Abdollah Javadi-Amoli, Mohammad Mohammadi Gilani, Mohammad Yazdi, Ahmad Azari Qomi, Mohammad-Taqi Mesbah-Yazdi, Mahdi Hosseini Rohani, Azizollah Khoshvaght, and Zaynolabideen Ghorbani.

== Legacy ==
He started teaching Kharij al-Fiqh and the Usool since early 1960 and served approximately 50 years in teaching theological subjects at his house. He composed poems of praise and eulogy for the Ahl al-Bayt, especially Imam Al-Husayn, which he had originally written in Persian. He left behind a large number of compilations, including: Kitab-e Salaat, Jama'e al-Masa’el, Zakhirah al-Ebaad Leyawm al-Maa`d, Tuzih al-Masaa'il, and Manaasek-e Hajj.

== Death ==
On 17 May 2009, aged 92 years, Bahjat died in Qom and was buried in the Fatima Masumeh Shrine.

== See also ==
- List of maraji
- Ja'afar Mojtahedi
- Abbas Quchani
