= Kůrka =

Kůrka (feminine: Kůrková) is a Czech surname. It is a diminutive of the word kůra, which translates as 'bark' or 'crust'. There is a theory that it was a nickname for a poor person ("used to eating hard crusts"). In Old Czech, the word figuratively meant 'glove' and the surname may also have originated as a designation for a glove maker. Notable people with the surname include:

- František Kůrka (1903–1952), Czech water polo player
- Jan Kůrka (born 1943), Czech sport shooter
- Kateřina Emmons, née Kůrková (born 1983), Czech sport shooter
- Petr Kůrka (born 1960), Czech sport shooter
- Tomáš Kůrka (born 1981), Czech ice hockey player
- Věra Kůrková (born 1948), Czech mathematician and computer scientist

== See also ==
- Kurka (surname)
