= Ja'far Mojtahedi =

Iranian mystic (b. 1925, d. 1996)

Ja’far Mojtahedi (Persian : جعفر مجتهدی) born on January 25, 1925, in Tabriz, was an Iranian mystic who preached love and seeking intercession (tawassul) to the Ahl al-Bayt as the best spiritual path. He died in Mashhad on January 26, 1996. Until 2015 at least eight books have written about him.

== Life ==
Ja'far Mojtahedi was born on February 1, 1924, to a religious and prosperous family in Tabriz. His father, Mirza Yusuf, was a devotee of Husayn ibn Ali, to the extent that he often led the caravan of pilgrims to Karbala from Tabriz and paid for the expenses of the poor pilgrims himself. Ja'far received his primary education in Tabriz and did not receive the traditional seminary education, but he was fully versed in Persian and Arabic texts and literature. Ja'far set out for Karbala on foot at a young age, but was imprisoned on the way for an unknown crime. In prison and after his release, many incidents happened to him, all of which resulted in greater recourse to and adherence to the Ahl al-Bayt and he became very exceptional and distinguished in his appeal to the infallible Imams. Ja'far settled in Qom at the age of 20. In the last years of his life, Sheikh Ja'far settled near the Imam Reza shrine for about four years. He died in 1374 AH.
