= Astaneh-ye Ashrafiyeh =

City in Gilan province, Iran

Astaneh-ye Ashrafiyeh Persian: آستانه اشرفيه
- City
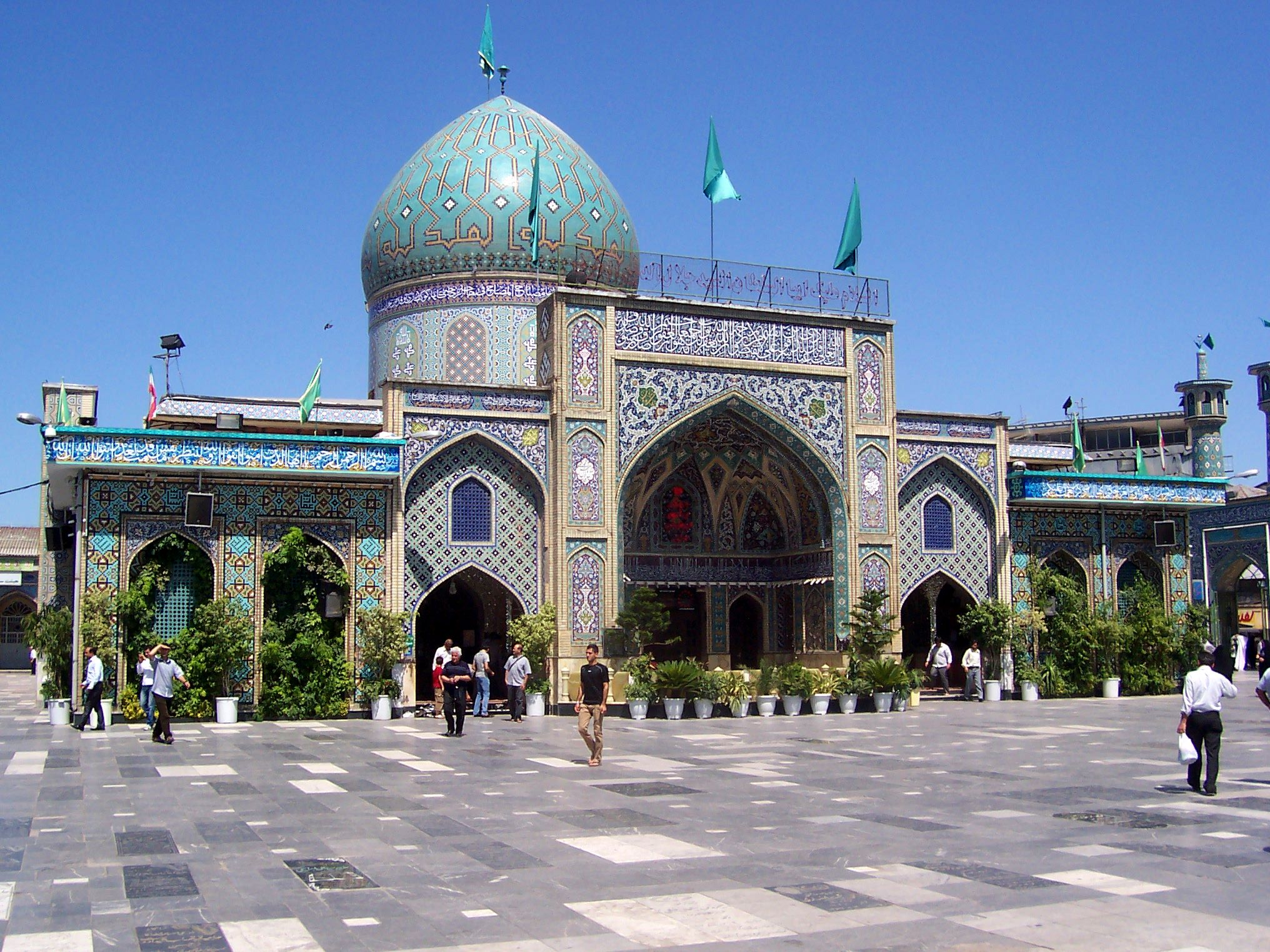
- Jalaleddin Ashraf Shrine

- Location within Iran
- Coordinates: 37°15′57″N 49°56′35″E
- Country: Iran
- Province: Gilan
- County: Astaneh-ye Ashrafiyeh
- District: Central

Population (2016)
  - Total: 44,941
- Time zone: UTC+3:30 (IRST)

Astaneh-ye Ashrafiyeh (Persian: آستانه اشرفيه) (Note: Also romanized as Āstāneh-ye Ashrafīyeh; also known as Astane and Āstāneh; Gilaki: أسسؤنه) is a city in the Central District of Astaneh-ye Ashrafiyeh County, Gilan province, Iran, serving as the capital of both the county and the district.

== Demographics ==
=== Population ===
At the time of the 2006 National Census, the city's population was 36,298 in 10,558 households. The following census in 2011 counted 40,726 people in 13,131 households. The 2016 census measured the population of the city as 44,941 people in 15,675 households.

== Overview ==
Astaneh-ye Ashrafiyeh is a major peanut, rice, silk, and fragrant medicinal herbs producing city. It lies close to the city of Rasht and the Caspian Sea. The mausoleum of Seyed Jalal od-Din Ashraf, brother of Imam Reza, as well as the tomb of Mohammad Moin, the Iranian lexicographer and compiler of Persian Dictionary, are located here.

The great Sepidrud river crosses the city on the northwest side. The main highway connecting the eastern and western parts of the province passes through Astaneh, over a c. 1-kilometre-long bridge. A satellite image of the city is found on google map.

- entry in the Encyclopædia Iranica
