= Astaneh-ye Ashrafiyeh County =

County in Gilan province, Iran

Astaneh-ye Ashrafiyeh County Persian: شهرستان آستانه اشرفیه
- County
- Location of Astaneh-ye Ashrafiyeh County in Gilan province (center right, green)

- Location of Gilan province in Iran
- Coordinates: 37°20′N 49°59′E
- Country: Iran
- Province: Gilan
- Capital: Astaneh-ye Ashrafiyeh
- Districts: Central, Kiashahr

Population (2016)
  - Total: 108,130
- Time zone: UTC+3:30 (IRST)

Astaneh-ye Ashrafiyeh County (Persian: شهرستان آستانه اشرفیه) is in Gilan province, in northwestern Iran. Its capital is the city of Astaneh-ye Ashrafiyeh.

== Demographics ==
=== Population ===
At the time of the 2006 National Census, the county's population was 107,801 in 32,202 households. The following census in 2011 counted 105,526 people in 35,280 households. The 2016 census measured the population of the county as 108,130 in 38,824 households.

=== Administrative divisions ===
Astaneh-ye Ashrafiyeh County's population history and administrative structure over three consecutive censuses are shown in the following table.

Astaneh-ye Ashrafiyeh County Population
Administrative Divisions	2006	2011	2016
Central District	72,867	72,388	75,045
Chahardeh RD	4,214	3,776	3,665
Dehshal RD	9,125	8,195	7,254
Kisom RD	10,294	9,317	8,935
Kurka RD	12,936	10,374	10,250
Astaneh-ye Ashrafiyeh (city)	36,298	40,726	44,941
Kiashahr District	34,934	33,138	33,085
Dehgah RD	10,832	9,805	9,548
Kiashahr RD	10,340	9,580	9,515
Kiashahr (city)	13,762	13,753	14,022
Total	107,801	105,526	108,130
RD = Rural District

== See also ==
Media related to Astaneh-ye Ashrafiyeh County at Wikimedia Commons
