= Central District (Astaneh-ye Ashrafiyeh County) =

District in Gilan province, Iran

Central District (Astaneh-ye Ashrafiyeh County) Persian: بخش مرکزی شهرستان آستانه اشرفیه
- District
- Location within Iran
- Coordinates: 37°17′N 49°56′E
- Country: Iran
- Province: Gilan
- County: Astaneh-ye Ashrafiyeh
- Capital: Astaneh-ye Ashrafiyeh

Population (2016)
  - Total: 75,045
- Time zone: UTC+3:30 (IRST)

The Central District of Astaneh-ye Ashrafiyeh County (Persian: بخش مرکزی شهرستان آستانه اشرفیه) is in Gilan province, in northwestern Iran. Its capital is the city of Astaneh-ye Ashrafiyeh.

== Demographics ==
=== Population ===
At the time of the 2006 National Census, the district's population was 72,867 in 21,692 households. The following census in 2011 counted 72,388 people in 23,983 households. The 2016 census measured the population of the district as 75,045 inhabitants in 26,825 households.

=== Administrative divisions ===
Central District (Astaneh-ye Ashrafiyeh County) Population
Administrative Divisions	2006	2011	2016
Chahardeh RD	4,214	3,776	3,665
Dehshal RD	9,125	8,195	7,254
Kisom RD	10,294	9,317	8,935
Kurka RD	12,936	10,374	10,250
Astaneh-ye Ashrafiyeh (city)	36,298	40,726	44,941
Total	72,867	72,388	75,045
RD = Rural District
