= Tucha =

Tucha may refer to:

- Tucha Range
- Tucha, Iran
- Tucha (singer)
