= Boris Berenfeld =

Research scientist and educational theorist

- Born: March 21, 1947 (age 79); Proskuriv
- Education: Moscow State University
- Occupations: research scientist, educational theorist

Boris Berenfeld (born March 21, 1947) is a research scientist with a Ph.D. in biophysics and an educational theorist focused on the application of advanced technologies in inquiry-based education. He linked Soviet students to the US National Geographic KidsNetwork, marking the beginning of uncensored student communications between the countries. In 1990, he developed the Global Lab Curriculum.

== Biography ==
Boris Berenfeld was born in Proskuriv (now Khmelnytskyi), Ukraine and in 1973, earned a Ph.D. in radiation biophysics from Moscow State University. Boris discovered a new class of long-lasting polymeric radioprotectors that reduced the damage in normal tissues caused by radiation. From 1979 to 1986, he taught graduate-level courses in radiation biology and biophysics at Moscow State University, and in 1982, he and Yuriy Kudryashov authored The Fundamentals of Radiation Biophysics.

In 1986, Boris joined a Soviet Academy of Sciences task force, “School-1,” led by Mikhail Gorbachev‘s adviser in science and technologies, Dr. Evgeny Velikhov, to rethink Soviet science education with computers. From 1986 to 1990, Boris led development of Science and Technologies Education Programs and was a senior research scientist for the Council of Cybernetics at the Soviet Academy of Sciences.

In 1988, Boris and colleagues from the Soviet Academy of Sciences founded the Institute of New Technologies in Education (INT). At the INT, Boris used the first computer networks to link high-school classrooms in the Soviet Union and United States, launching the first uncensored telecommunications with the West. In 1987–1989, Boris helped to bring the National Geographic KidsNetwork to Soviet schools.

In 1990, Boris relocated to the United States, being invited to join TERC, a think tank specializing in the application of advanced technologies in education that was spun off from Massachusetts Institute of Technology. There, with support from the National Science Foundation (NSF), he developed the Global Lab Curriculum, the first Internet-based, full-year high-school science course that linked high schools in almost 30 countries into a collaborative learning network. In 1997, he and Dr, Lynne Shrum, co-authored “Teaching and Learning in the Information Age, a Guide to Educational Telecommunication”. From 2005 to 2011, Boris launched an upgraded version of Global Lab to capitalize on the economies, scalability, and functionalities offered by cloud computing.

From 1995 to 1998, Boris was co-principal investigator in charge of curriculum development for the GLOBE Program. From 1995 to 1996, he served as a consultant for the World Bank’s Distance Learning Projects. From 1996 to 1999, he served as Advisor to the UNESCO Director General's Task Force on Learning Without Frontiers, which sought to develop strategies to combat exclusion from learning opportunities. During the mid-1990s, Boris was Science and Technology Director for Project TTEC: Teachers, Technologies & Environmental Concerns, a program to train inner-city, elementary teachers in the implementation of inquiry-based science curriculum, and served as Chief Scientific and Technology Advisor for The International Center For Education & Technology at the University of Hartford.

In 2003 Boris founded Learning Probe International, Inc., which developed a handheld probe system allowing students to monitor their local environments. In 2008, he founded The International Laboratory of Advanced Education Technologies, Ltd. (ILAET) as a think tank for deploying advanced technologies in education. From 1993 to 2002, Boris was a member of the editorial board of T.H.E. (Technology Horizons in Education) Journal, and from 1995 to 2005, he served as Associated Editor for the Education Communication and Information (ECI) Journal, an international journal focusing on the implementation of information and communication technologies in education.

In 2008, Boris was inducted as a fellow for life into the World Technology Network. In 2011, Science Magazine awarded the developers of the "Molecular Workbench", led by Drs. Boris Berenfeld and Robert Tinker, The Science Prize for Online Resources in Education (SPORE), which was established to encourage innovation and excellence in education.

Since 2020, Boris serves as Chief Education and Technologies Advisor for the Babi Yar Holocaust Memorial Center in Kyiv (Ukraine) where he authored the Red Dot Remembrances crowdsourcing Internet platform that uses the geographic information system to map data, artifacts, and memories related to the Holocaust in Ukraine.
