= Khmelnytskyi =

City and administrative center of Khmelnytskyi Oblast, Ukraine

Khmelnytskyi Хмельницький
- City
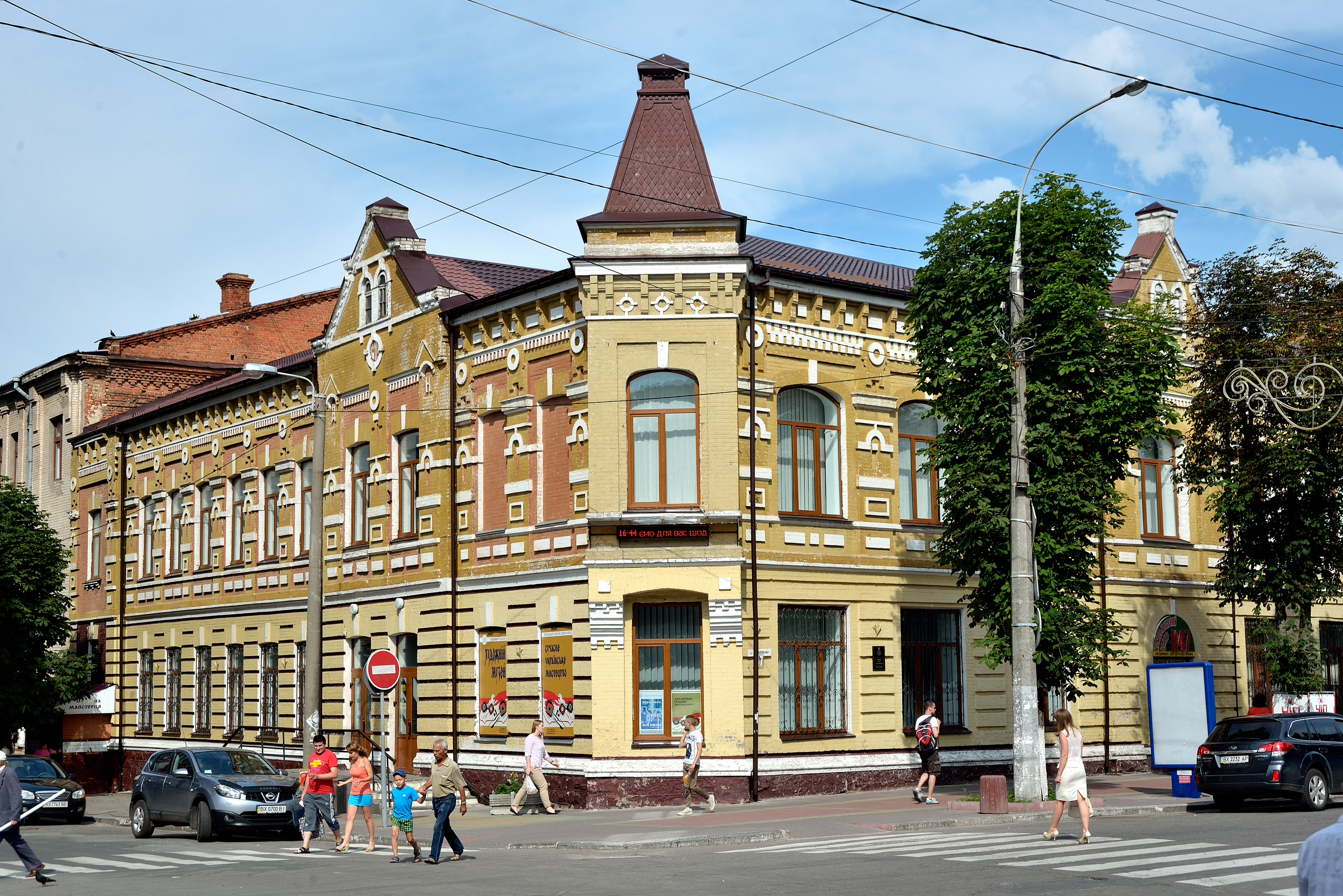
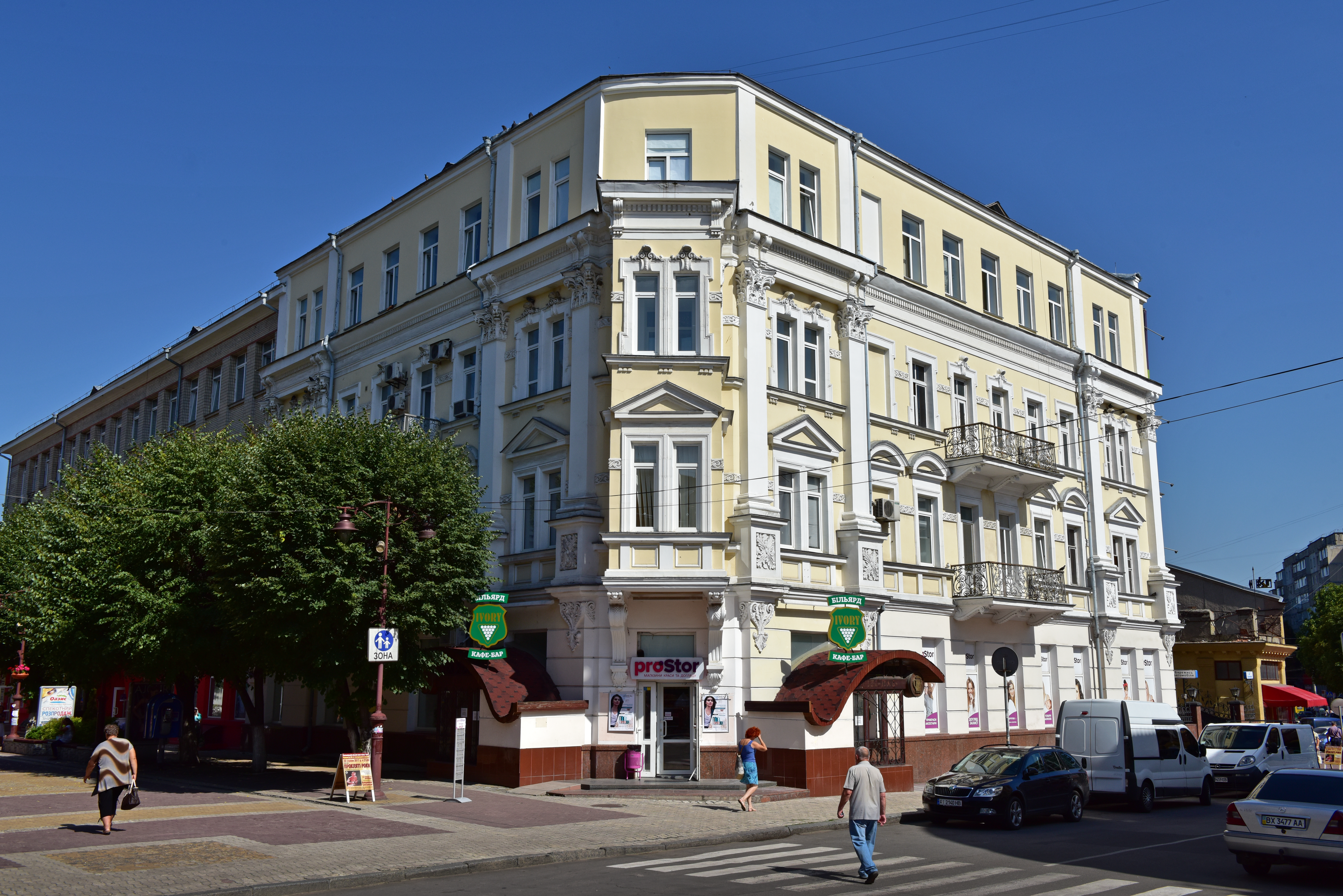
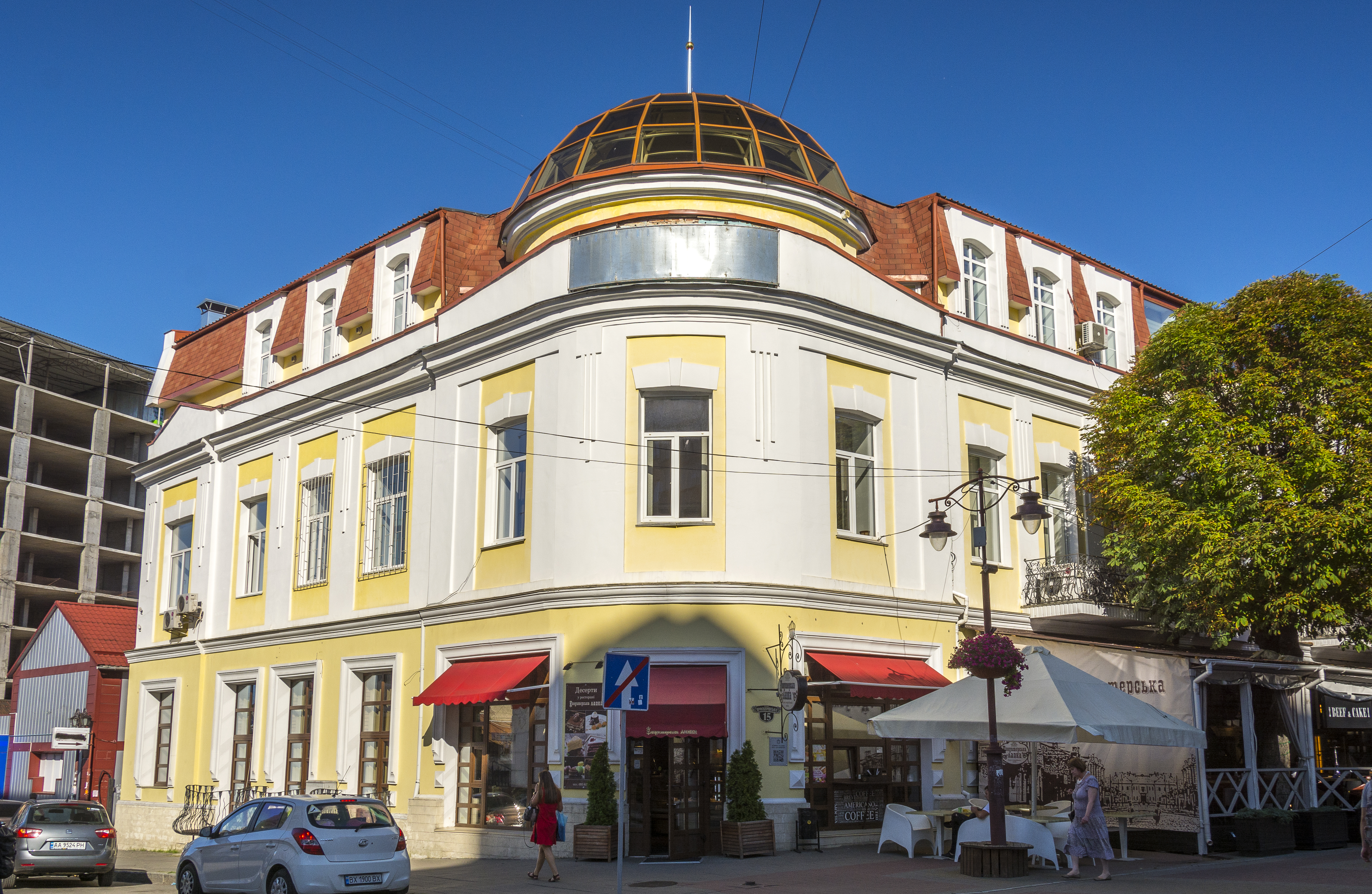
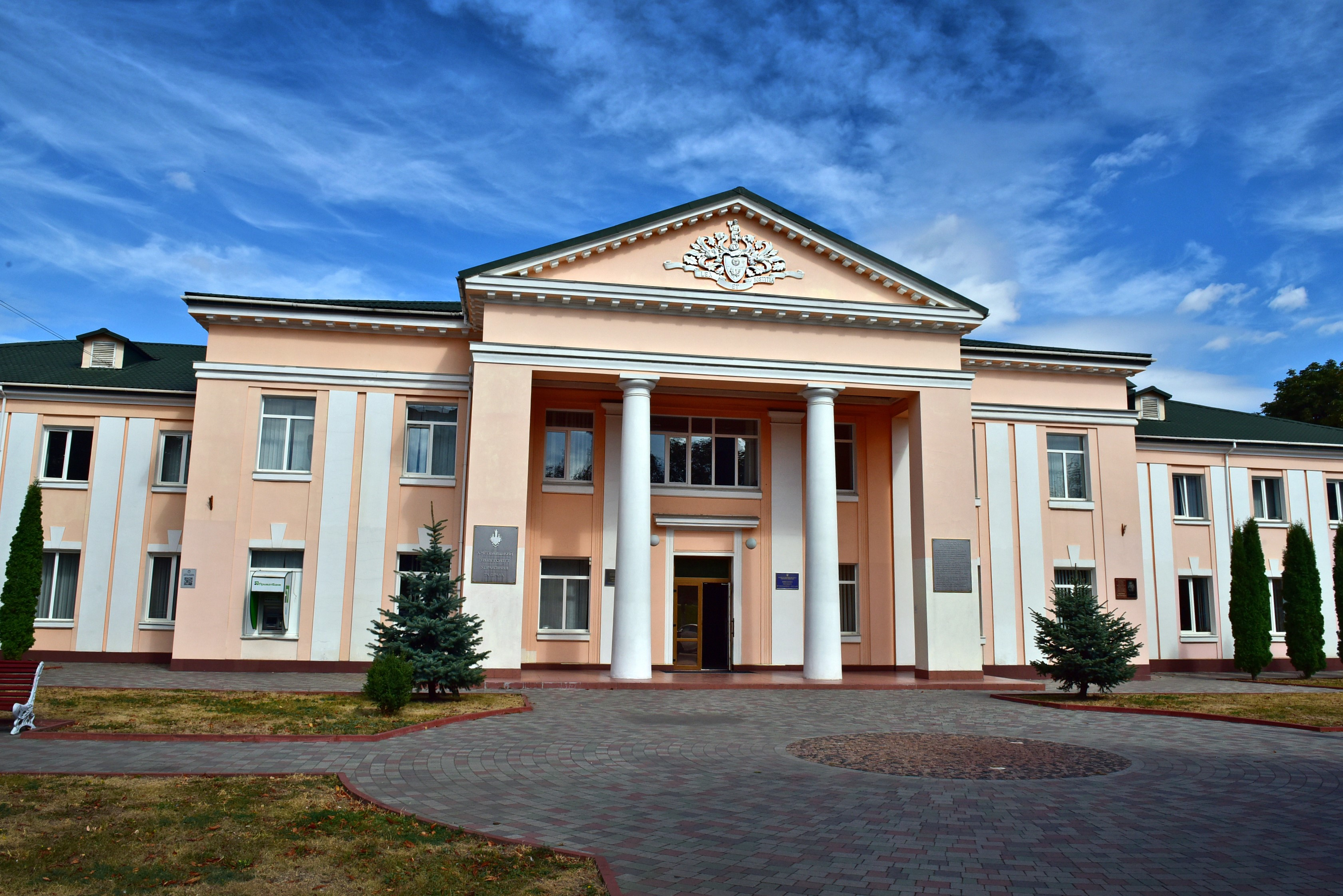
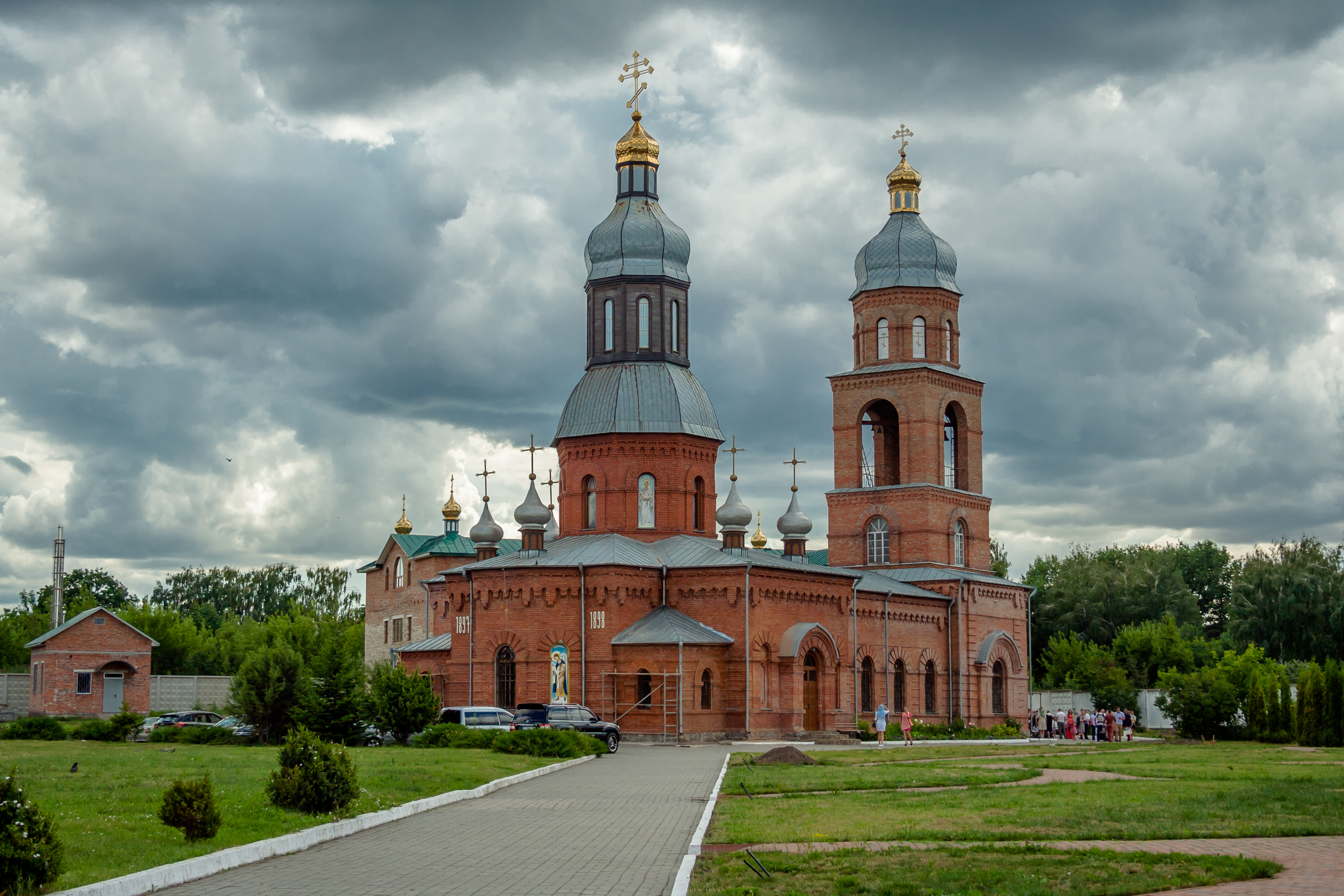
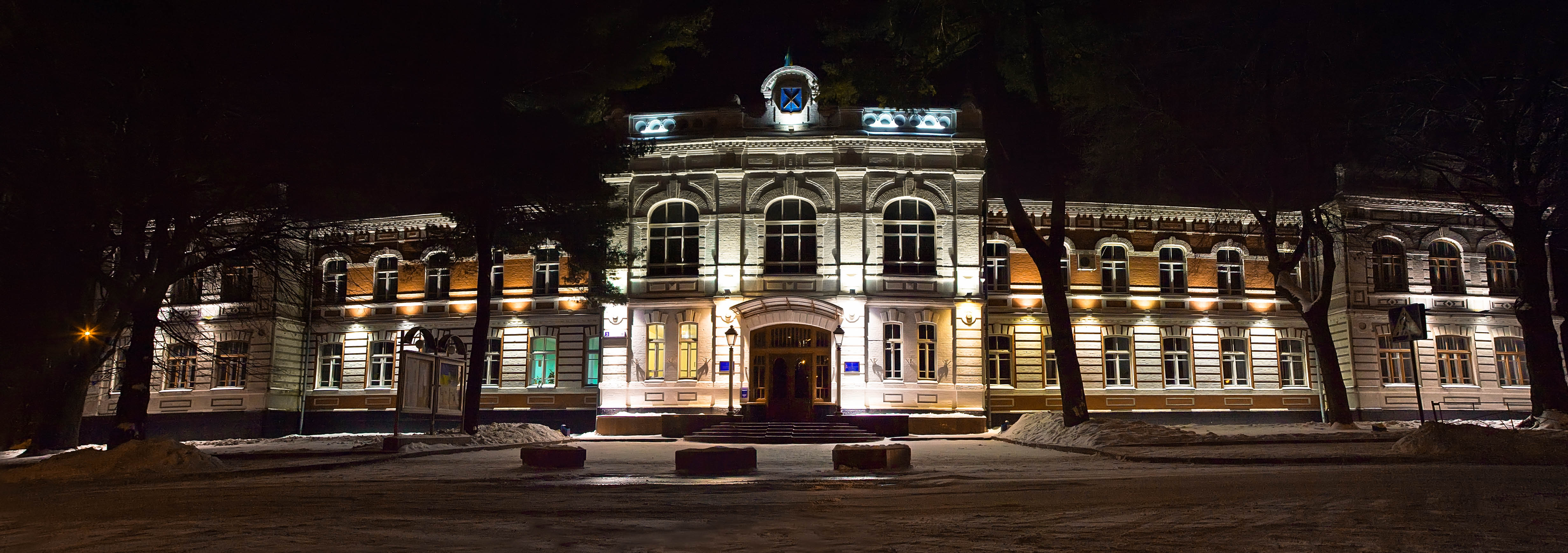
- Regional Art Museum Pharmacy Restaurant Elephant House of the Officers Church of St. George the Victorious City Council Building

- Flag Coat of arms

- Location of Khmelnytskyi in Ukraine Khmelnytskyi (Ukraine)
- Coordinates: 49°25′0″N 27°00′0″E
- Country: Ukraine
- Oblast: Khmelnytskyi Oblast
- Raion: Khmelnytskyi Raion
- Hromada: Khmelnytskyi urban hromada
- First mentioned: 1431
- City rights: 22 September 1937

Government
  - Mayor: Oleksandr Symchyshyn (Svoboda)

Area
  - Total: 90 km^{2} (35 sq mi)

Population (2022)
  - Total: 274,452
  - Density: 2,822/km^{2} (7,310/sq mi)
- Postal code: 29000
- Area code: +380 382
- Website: khmelnytsky.com

Khmelnytskyi (Note: Also rendered as Khmelnytsky, Khmelnytskyy and Khmelnitsky) (Ukrainian: Хмельницький, IPA: [xmelʲˈnɪtsʲkɪi̯]) is a city in western Ukraine. Located on the Southern Bug, it serves as the administrative centre of Khmelnytskyi Oblast as well as Khmelnytskyi Raion within the oblast. With a population of 274,452 (2022 estimate), Khmelnytskyi is the second-largest city in the historical region of Podolia, after Vinnytsia.

The city was first mentioned in 1431 as a military outpost. Under the Polish rule it was known as Płoskirów. It was seized by Cossacks during the Khmelnytsky Uprising and was later ruled by the Ottomans until 1699. The city was passed to Russia in 1793 as a result of the Second Partition of Poland, and became part of the newly-formed Podolia Governorate, where it became known as Proskuriv or Proskurov. From 1917 to 1920, it was controlled by the short-lived Ukrainian People's Republic before becoming part of Soviet Ukraine. The city's Jewish population fell from 42 per cent in 1939 to 10 per cent in 1959 as a result of the Holocaust. In 1954, it was renamed Khmelnytskyi in honor of the Cossack leader Bohdan Khmelnytsky.

Khmelnytskyi is the location of a rail junction and an important industrial centre, as well as a centre for higher education such as the Khmelnytskyi National University and the Khmelnytskyi Oblast Ukrainian Music and Drama Theater.

== Names ==
=== Current name ===
- Ukrainian: Хмельницький, romanized: Khmelnytskyi IPA: [xmelʲˈnɪtsʲkɪi̯]

=== Former names ===
- Płoskirów (also spelled Płoskirowce; (Polish: [pwɔsˈkiruf]; Ukrainian: Плоскирів, romanized: Ploskyriv; Polish: [plɔskiˈrɔftsɛ]; Ukrainian: Плоскирівці, romanized: Ploskyrivtsi)) 1431-1703
- Proskurov (also spelled Proskuriv; (Russian: Проскуровъ, Modern orthography: Проскуров, pronounced [prɐˈskurəf]; Ukrainian: Проскурів, romanized: Proskuriv [proˈskurʲiu̯])) 1793-1954

=== Name history ===
==== Płoskirów and Płoskirowce ====
The earliest mention of the city dates back to 10 February 1431, when Polish King Władysław II Jagiełło issued a royal grant giving the village of Płoskirowce and Holysyn (now Oleshyn), which were near the Boh river in Podolia, to a nobleman, Jan Chanstulowski, for the sum of 100 hryvnias. This is recorded in the Lithuanian Metrica, which states in the original text in Latin, "super villis Holissini et Ploskirowcze super fluvio Boh iacentu in terra Podoliensi et districtu Laticzowiensi sitas." In documents dating to that same year, according to Yesyunin, the shortened form of 'Płoskirow was already in use alongside Płoskirowce. (Note: Others date the introduction of the shortened one to Władysław III.) For example, entries from 1461 and 1464 by Casimir IV Jagiellon refer to the village as Płoskirow, but another entry in Lvov from 1470 uses Płoskirowce. Eventually, according to Yesyunin, the shortened spelling of Płoskirów took favour, and it was the form used from the 1500s to the city's annexation in 1793.

There are also different theories about where the toponym of Płoskirów comes from. According to one, the name refers to where the settlement is, which is at the confluence of the mouth of the Ploska River (in Polish, Płoska), and a river that probably existed, known as Riv (in Polish, Rów). It is theorised that the river Riv used to surround the Płoskirów Castle before eventually disappearing. Other theories simply attribute the name to just the river Ploska.

==== Proskurov and Proskuriv ====
Following the Second Partition of Poland and the annexation of the region into the Russian Empire, the city was renamed. The name is dated to an imperial decree of 5 July 1795, which created the Proskurov uezd, with the city of Proskurov as its seat. It is notable that there is no resolution actually renaming the city, with some suggesting that the name Proskurov was a mistake that came from scribes who sent a tax description of the settlement to the Russian government, where the clearer-to-Russian-speakers Proskurov was used over the original Russian translation of Płoskirów as Ploskyriv/Ploskyrov. This toponym of Proskurov is very similar to the name "proskura", which is a bread in the liturgical service. The transliteration of Ploskyriv/Ploskyrov continued to be used for some time after the annexation until Proskurov was officially established in documentary usage by 1801.

==== Khmelnytskyi ====
Sign of Khmelnytskyi at the city's entrance

On 16 January 1954, Proskurov was renamed Khmelnytskyi by the Presidium of the Supreme Soviet of the Ukrainian SSR at the same time as Kamianets-Podilskyi Oblast was renamed to Khmelnytskyi Oblast. This occurred during celebrations for the Union of Russia and Ukraine Tercentenary, and according to the decree renaming the city, Khmelnytskyi was in honour of Bohdan Khmelnytsky, the Cossack hetman who rebelled against the Polish–Lithuanian Commonwealth during the Khmelnytsky Uprising. According to accounts, as part of the tercentenary, Pereiaslav was the first city chosen to be renamed, and it was decided after this that an administrative centre and its oblast would also be. Kyiv and Dnipro immediately declined alongside Vinnytsia, with three finalists for renaming coming up: Cherkasy, Ternopil, and Proskurov. Tymofii Lisovyi, the then first secretary of the Kamianets-Podilskyi obkom, there was hesitation between the three, with Ternopil not being chosen due to fears of reprisals because of the region's strong association with Ukrainian nationalism, while Cherkasy was also dropped because it was the birthplace of Taras Shevchenko. Thus, Proskurov was chosen, and it was also noted that the oblast already needed to be renamed since the administrative centre was no longer in Kamianets-Podilskyi after it was moved to Proskurov in 1941. Others justified it by saying that the Khmelnytsky Uprising had some battle sites nearby, although Khmelnytsky himself never actually visited Proskurov.

== History ==
=== Ancient, medieval and early modern eras ===
The city foundation date is uncertain. The territory where Khmelnytskyi is situated has been inhabited for a very long time. Many archaeological discoveries have been made in the city suburbs. For example, to the East of Lezneve district, there was a settlement from the Bronze Age 2000 B.C., and from Scythian times from 7–3 century B.C. The first mention of the city was written with Cyrillic alphabet. The earliest known mention in historical sources was in 1431, when it was known as Płoskirów (Ploskirov, Плоскиров) and was part of the Kingdom of Poland. It was a royal city of Poland, administratively located in the Podolian Voivodeship in the Lesser Poland Province.

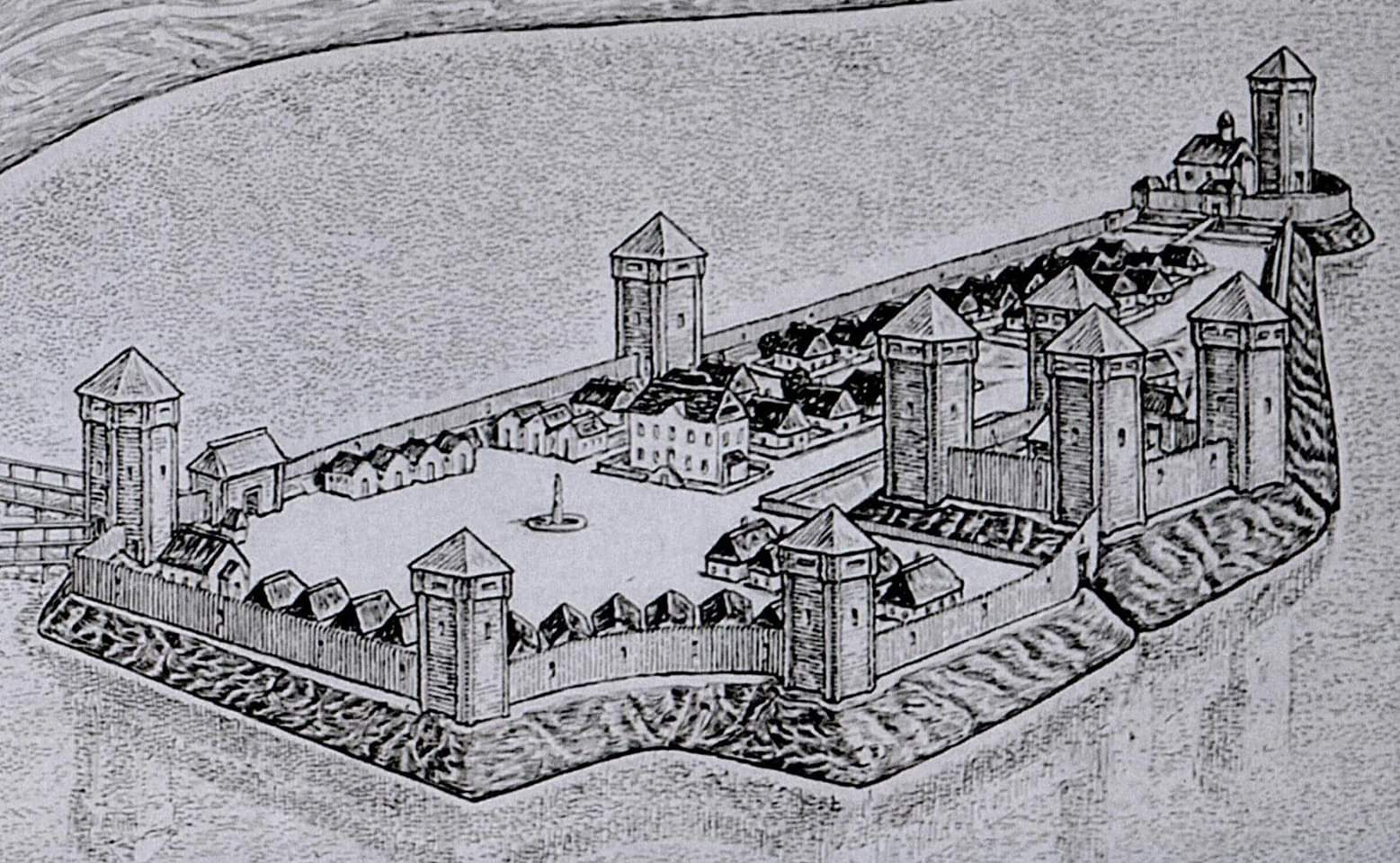
Contemporary visualization of the 17th-century city

In 1550 King Sigismund II Augustus granted the town to standard-bearer Maciej Włodek as a reward for his military service. In 1578, King Stephen Bathory established weekly markets and three annual fairs. After the death of Stanisław Włodek, son of Maciej, Płoskirów became again a royal city of Poland. It was completely devastated during the Khmelnytsky Uprising, thus as of 1662 it had only 12 inhabitants, who did not pay any taxes. Płoskirów became a private town of the magnate Zamoyski family.

Polish rule was briefly interrupted by the Ottomans between 1672 and 1699. During this period, it was a subdivision of Mejibuji sanjak in Podolia Eyalet as Poloskiruf. The recovery of the city was halted by Ottoman rule. After Poland regained the city, the Zamoyski family came back and brought Poles from Mazovia to resettle the city, exempting the new inhabitants from taxes for the first few years. As of 1765, the city had furriers', weavers' and coopers' guilds. In 1775 King Stanisław August Poniatowski to help further rebuild the city established two additional annual fairs, each lasting two weeks.

=== 19th and early 20th century ===
After the Second Partition of Poland in 1793, the city was annexed by the Russian Empire and was renamed Proskurov (Проскуров). Russification policies were enacted and intensified after the unsuccessful Polish uprisings of 1830–31 and 1863–65. Nevertheless, local Poles retained their language and customs, including folk costumes inspired by the Biłgoraj area. Writer Maria Dunin-Kozicka noted that Polish was still widely spoken in the city. According to the Russian census of 1897, Proskurov with a population of 22,855 was the fifth largest city of Podolia after Kamianets-Podilskyi, Uman, Vinnytsia and Balta.

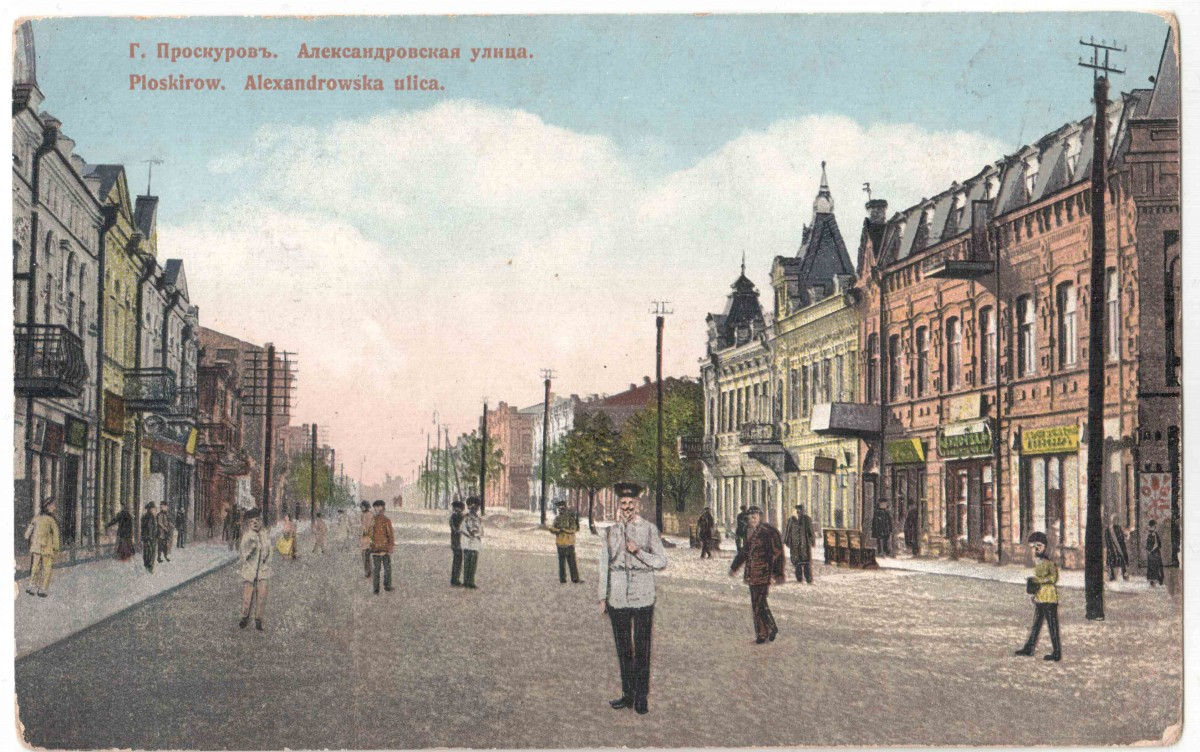
Early-20th-century postcard

With the fall of the Russian Empire, the city was contested by Poles, Ukrainians and Soviets. During that period, a series of anti-Jewish pogroms were carried out in the region, known together as the Proskurov pogrom. According to Vinnytsia's city archives, the pogrom was conducted on the Friday night of February 15, 1919, by one of the otamans (generals) of the Ukrainian People's Army, Otaman Semysenko (also rendered as Semesenko). Estimates vary as to the number of victims, some putting the death toll at 1,500 Jews in Proskurov alone, with 600 more killed in nearby Filshtein.

The Chief Otaman Petliura had been appointed head of state just two days prior to the tragedy, on February the 13th. Petliura issued Order 131 in which he mentioned the fact that numerous Jewish parties in Ukraine (Bund, Poale Zion, Folks-Partei, Unificationists) rose to defend the sovereignty of the Ukrainian Republic and were cooperating with the Ukrainian government. He condemned such pogroms, calling those initiating them deserters and enemies of the State that must be liquidated. The order was co-signed by the Chief of Staff, Otaman Yunakiv. The order was published in the Ukraina newspaper on February 20 (March 4, new style). Later, Petliura issued a special order to execute Semysenko for being the pogrom initiator. According to sources the order was carried out on March 20, 1920. Other sources claim that he was released.

During the Schwartzbard trial, at the end of which Petliura's assassin was pardoned on the grounds of self-trail (revenge), the main argument of the defense was that Schwartzbard had acted as an avenger of the Jews killed in pogroms perpetrated during Petliura's rule.

During the Polish–Soviet War, in the first half of 1920 the city was controlled by Poland as part of the Podolian District, and afterwards it passed to Soviet Ukraine.

=== Interwar period ===
As part of korenizatsiia, in 1924, a Polish village council was established in the then village of Hrechany (Polish: Hreczany; now a district of the city), whose entire population was Polish. Hrechany was designed to become the capital of a new Polish National District, however, the plan was abandoned by the Soviet authorities. In 1936, part of the Polish population was expelled to Kazakhstan. During the Polish Operation of the NKVD, the local Polish population was persecuted with mass deportations and executions. It was one of two cities in Podolia where the most Poles were executed (alongside Kamianets-Podilskyi).

=== World War II ===
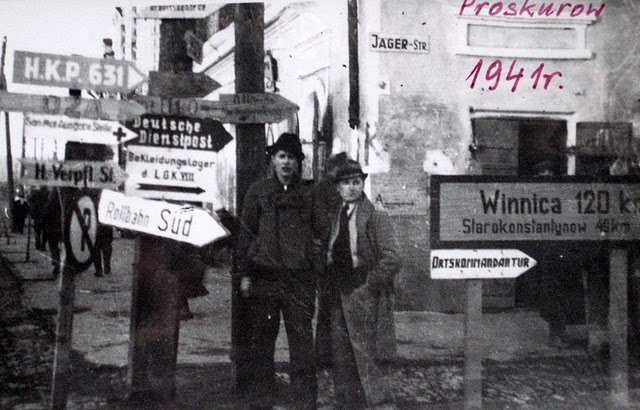
A street corner during the German occupation

At the start of World War II, on 11 September 1939, the Ukrainian Front of the Red Army was formed shortly before the Soviet invasion on Poland, and its headquarters was located in Proskuriv.

The town was occupied by the German Army from July 8, 1941 to March 25, 1944. On November 4, 1941, 5300 Jewish inhabitants of the town and surrounding villages were shot by an Einsatzgruppe. A ghetto was formed on December 14, 1941, where all surviving Jewish inhabitants had to resettle and were subjected to forced labor. They were subsequently killed in the fall of 1942. More than 9500 Jews were killed in the town in total. Some remaining local Poles were deported by the German occupiers to forced labour in Germany. Since 1943, Poles, who were previously deported east from Proskuriv by the Soviets, were allowed to join the Polish People's Army, and many joined.

=== Postwar period ===
In 1954 the city was finally renamed Khmelnytskyi (Хмельницький) in the honor of the 300th anniversary of a treaty negotiated by Bohdan Khmelnytsky.

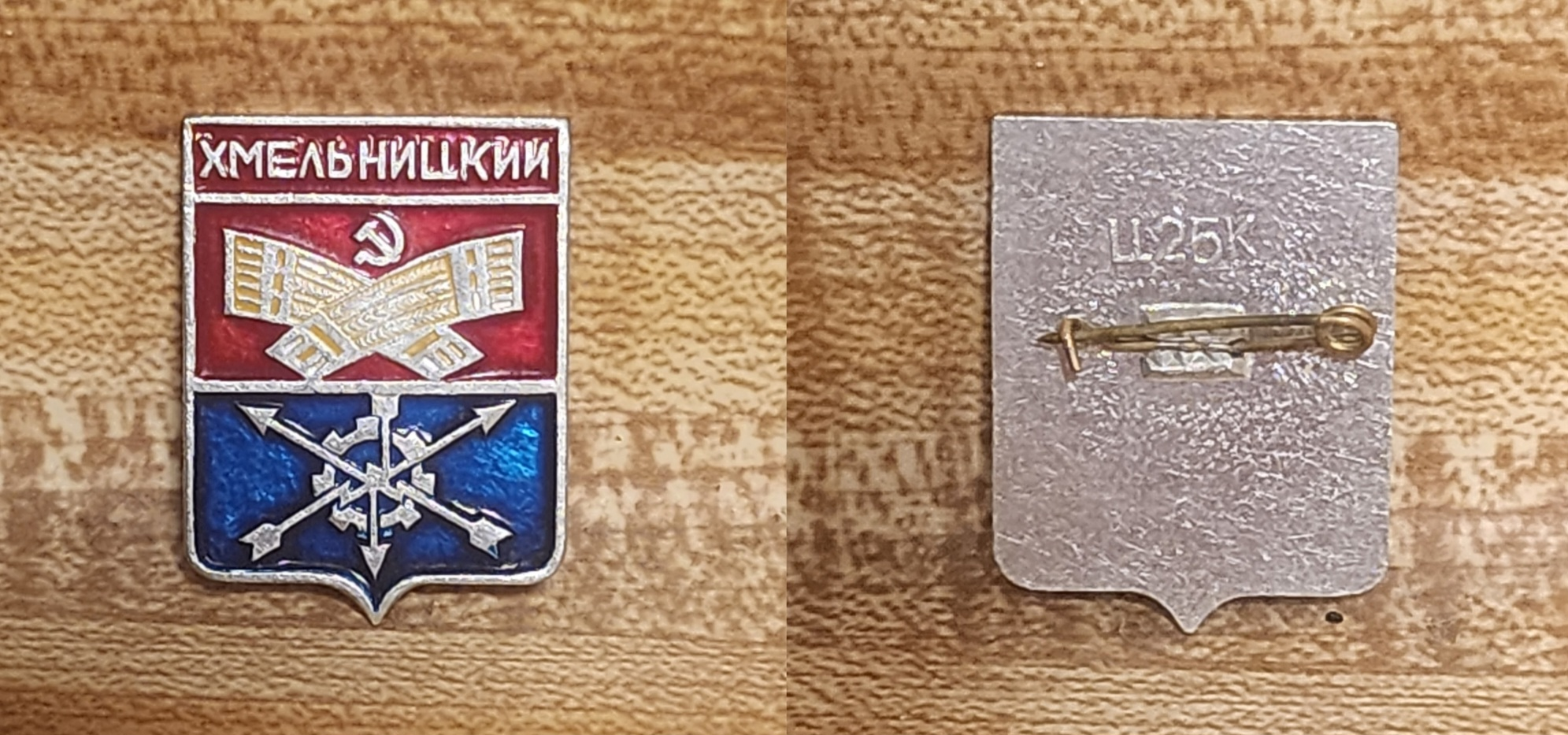
A Khmelnytskyi badge, originating from the Soviet era.

Khmelnytskyi was home to the 19th Division of the 43rd Rocket Army of the Soviet Strategic Rocket Forces during the Cold War. The intercontinental ballistic missile silos of the division that were housed there were removed and destroyed, partially with U.S. Cooperative Threat Reduction funding, during the 1990s.

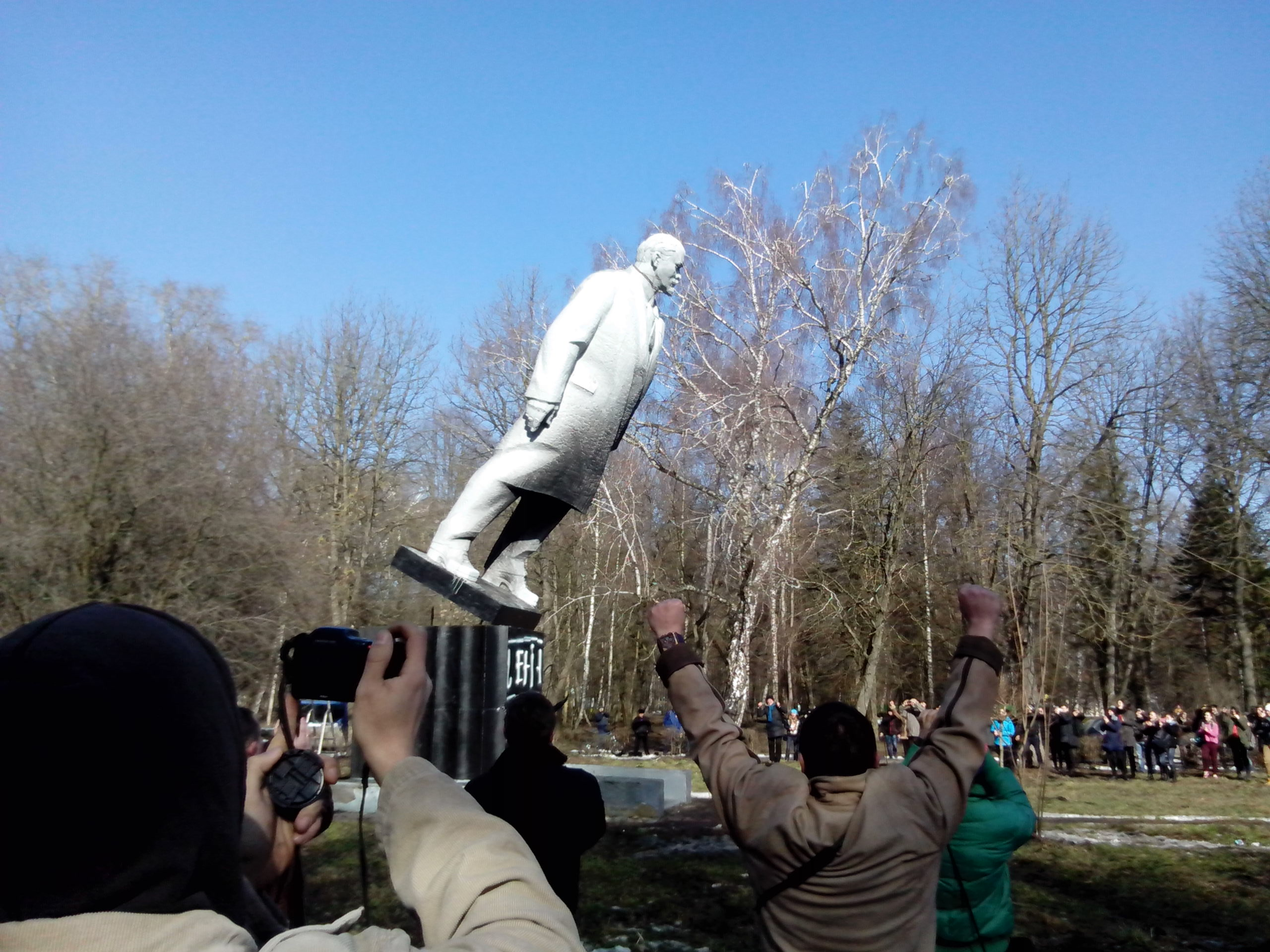
Toppling of Lenin statue in Khmelnytsky park, Ukraine

After new archival sources had been presented at the 2006 conference City of Khmelnytskyi in the Context of Ukrainian History post-dated the city’s earliest mention from 1493 to 1431, it changed its official 513th anniversary commemoration to its 575th.

Until 18 July 2020, Khmelnytskyi was incorporated as a city of oblast significance and served as the administrative center of Khmelnytskyi Raion though it did not belong to the raion. In July 2020, as part of the administrative reform of Ukraine, which reduced the number of raions of Khmelnytskyi Oblast to three, the city of Khmelnytskyi was merged into Khmelnytskyi Raion.

=== Russian invasion of Ukraine ===
On 10 October 2022, during the Russian invasion of Ukraine, the city was targeted by Russian cruise missiles as part of a major retaliation strike for the Crimean Bridge explosion, causing a blackout in the city and limiting water supply.

During a missile attack on 31 December, a gas station and a military facility inside the city was hit by two Russian cruise missiles, killing at least one civilian and wounding nine. The attack also caused a partial blackout and damaged more than a dozen cars and several residential buildings, including a kindergarten.

On 23 February 2023, Russian forces hit Khmelnytskyi with 3 Iranian-made UAVs of the "Shahed type", killing one person and wounding four. Additionally, the attack caused a fire and damaged multiple buildings.

== Geography ==
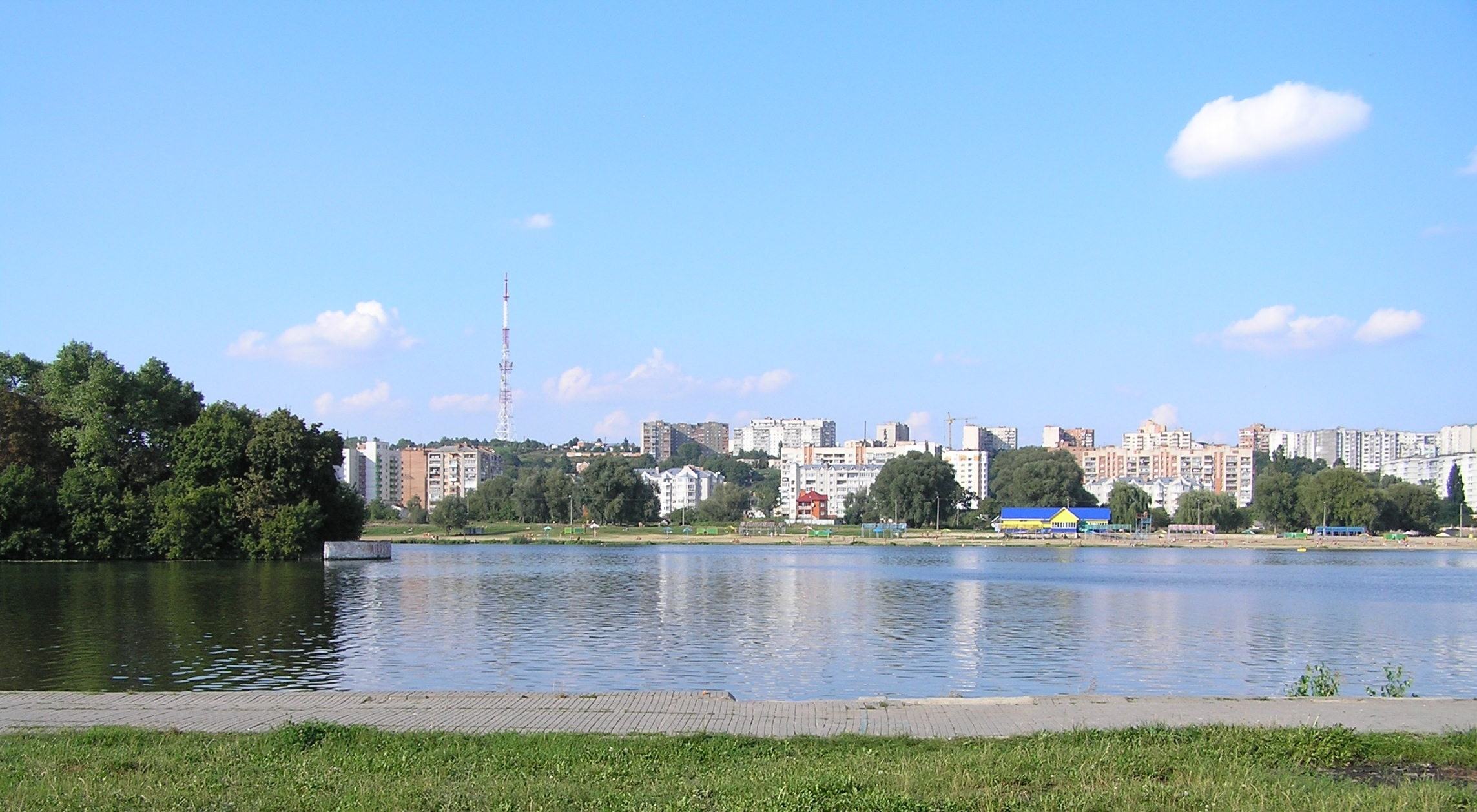
Khmelnytskyi's riverside skyline on the Southern Bug, early 2010s.

Khmelnytskyi is the regional center of the Khmelnytskyi region which is located in the western part of Ukraine in the middle of Podillia, its total area makes up 8,624 ha (21,310 acres). Khmelnytskyi has a favorable geographical position. Khmelnytskyi is crossed by one of the longest rivers of Ukraine – the Southern Bug. Coincidentally, through the western portion of the city flows the small river Ploska.

The most abundant make up for the ground in Khmelnytskyi are layers of the following overburden: loess and loess-type rocks. The ground-climatic conditions of Khmelnytskyi are favorable for the cultivation of winter wheat and rye, sugar beet, potato and other crops. Khmelnytskyi is also ideal for the development of gardening and vegetable growing. In the territory of Khmelnytskyi there are the vegetations of two geobotanical zones of Ukraine: Polissya and forest-steppe. Khmelnytskyi and its greater region supplies many rock products, particularly building materials such as limestone, plaster, chalk, tripoli powder, crystal layers (granites, gneisses), sand, sandstones, and also graphite, saponite, kaolin, phosphorite, lithographic stone, and roofing slate. There are also deposits of peat, bitumen, shale, and oil.

=== Climate ===
The climate of Khmelnytskyi is moderately continental. The average temperature of Khmelnytskyi in its warmest month (July) is 20 to 22 °C (68 to 72 °F), and the average temperature in the coldest month (January) is −5 to −6 °C (23 to 21 °F). The maximum temperatures in the summer on average reaches 36 to 38 °C (97 to 100 °F), and the minimum temperatures in the winter on average is −24 to −30 °C (−11 to −22 °F). Khmelnytskyi's average annual temperature is 7 to 8 °C (45 to 46 °F). Khmelnytskyi's average annual precipitation is 510 to 580 mm (20.08 to 22.83 in).

Climate data for Khmelnytskyi (1991–2020, extremes 1955–2011)
Month	Jan	Feb	Mar	Apr	May	Jun	Jul	Aug	Sep	Oct	Nov	Dec	Year
Record high °C (°F)	12.0 (53.6)	17.1 (62.8)	23.0 (73.4)	26.5 (79.7)	31.7 (89.1)	33.9 (93.0)	35.5 (95.9)	36.1 (97.0)	30.4 (86.7)	26.6 (79.9)	20.0 (68.0)	12.8 (55.0)	36.1 (97.0)
Mean daily maximum °C (°F)	−1.3 (29.7)	0.4 (32.7)	6.0 (42.8)	14.2 (57.6)	20.0 (68.0)	23.1 (73.6)	25.0 (77.0)	24.8 (76.6)	19.2 (66.6)	12.6 (54.7)	5.4 (41.7)	0.1 (32.2)	12.5 (54.5)
Daily mean °C (°F)	−3.8 (25.2)	−2.6 (27.3)	1.8 (35.2)	8.9 (48.0)	14.4 (57.9)	17.7 (63.9)	19.4 (66.9)	19.0 (66.2)	13.8 (56.8)	8.0 (46.4)	2.5 (36.5)	−2.3 (27.9)	8.1 (46.6)
Mean daily minimum °C (°F)	−6.2 (20.8)	−5.4 (22.3)	−1.7 (28.9)	4.1 (39.4)	9.2 (48.6)	12.7 (54.9)	14.4 (57.9)	13.8 (56.8)	9.3 (48.7)	4.4 (39.9)	0.0 (32.0)	−4.6 (23.7)	4.2 (39.6)
Record low °C (°F)	−30.5 (−22.9)	−27.0 (−16.6)	−23.6 (−10.5)	−7.2 (19.0)	−2.8 (27.0)	2.2 (36.0)	3.6 (38.5)	2.1 (35.8)	−5.0 (23.0)	−11.4 (11.5)	−17.8 (0.0)	−25.4 (−13.7)	−30.5 (−22.9)
Average precipitation mm (inches)	32 (1.3)	34 (1.3)	36 (1.4)	45 (1.8)	58 (2.3)	91 (3.6)	97 (3.8)	64 (2.5)	61 (2.4)	43 (1.7)	40 (1.6)	38 (1.5)	639 (25.2)
Average precipitation days (≥ 1.0 mm)	8.4	8.5	8.2	8.0	8.9	10.0	10.3	6.9	7.9	7.5	7.4	9.1	101.1
Average relative humidity (%)	87.6	84.5	78.0	67.5	67.8	71.9	73.0	70.5	75.3	81.1	88.0	88.7	77.8
Source 1: NOAA
Source 2: Climatebase.ru (extremes)

== Demographics ==
Historical population
Year	Pop.	±%
1897	22,855	—
1926	27,298	+19.4%
1939	37,481	+37.3%
1959	62,473	+66.7%
1970	112,959	+80.8%
1979	171,801	+52.1%
1989	236,938	+37.9%
2001	253,994	+7.2%
2011	262,788	+3.5%
2022	274,452	+4.4%

According to a 2017 survey, 94% of the population are ethnic Ukrainians and 3% are Russians. As of the 2001 Ukrainian census, 88.4% of the population were Ukrainians, 7.9% had an ethnic Russian background and 2% were ethnic Poles. Smaller minorities were Belarusians, Armenians and Ashkenazi Jews. The exact ethnic composition was as follows:

Ethnic groups in Khmelnytskyi
	percent
Ukrainians	88.35%
Russians	7.93%
Poles	1.96%
Belarusians	0.38%
Jews	0.27%
Armenians	0.11%
Moldovans	0.09%
Azerbaijanis	0.06%
Tatars	0.06%
Gypsies	0.06%
others	0.73%

=== Language ===
Distribution of the population by native language according to the 2001 census:

Language	Number	Percentage
Ukrainian	221 920	88.39%
Russian	26 006	10.36%
Other or undecided	3 151	1.25%
Total	251 077	100.00%

According to a survey conducted by the International Republican Institute in April–May 2023, 88% of the city's population spoke Ukrainian at home, and 9% spoke Russian.

== Education ==
Khmelnytskyi hosts 6 universities, 2 academies, 3 institutes, 12 colleges, 4 technical schools and 15 representative offices of other Ukrainian HEIs.

== Infrastructure ==
=== Transportation ===
==== Local transportation ====
===== Trolleybuses =====
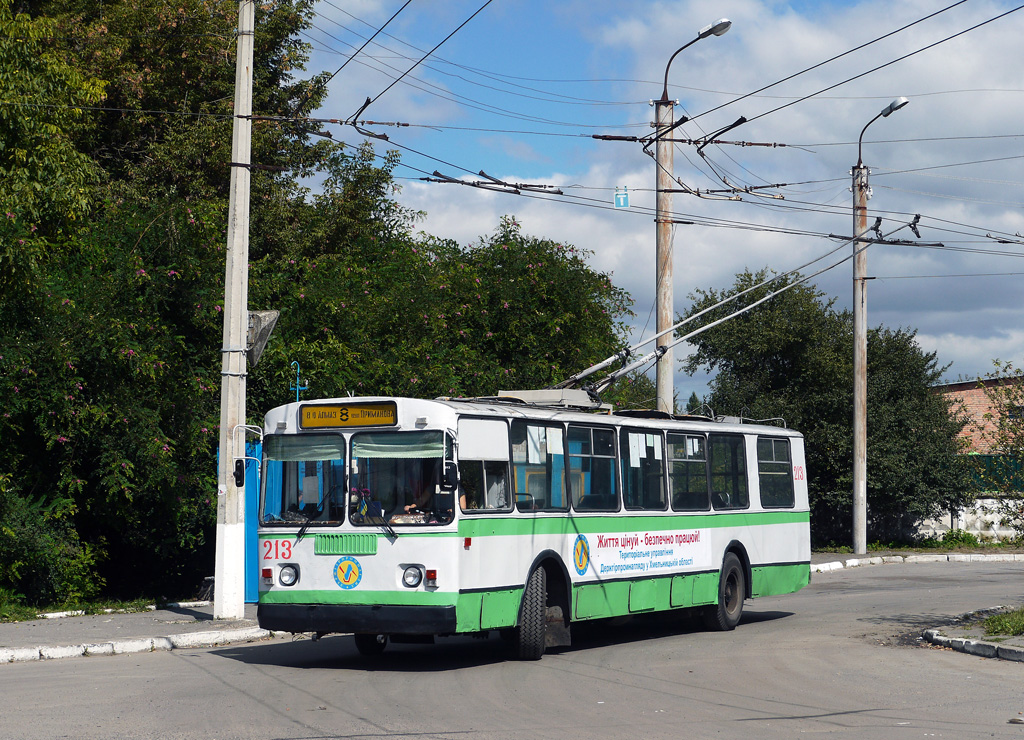
A ZiU-9b in 2013.

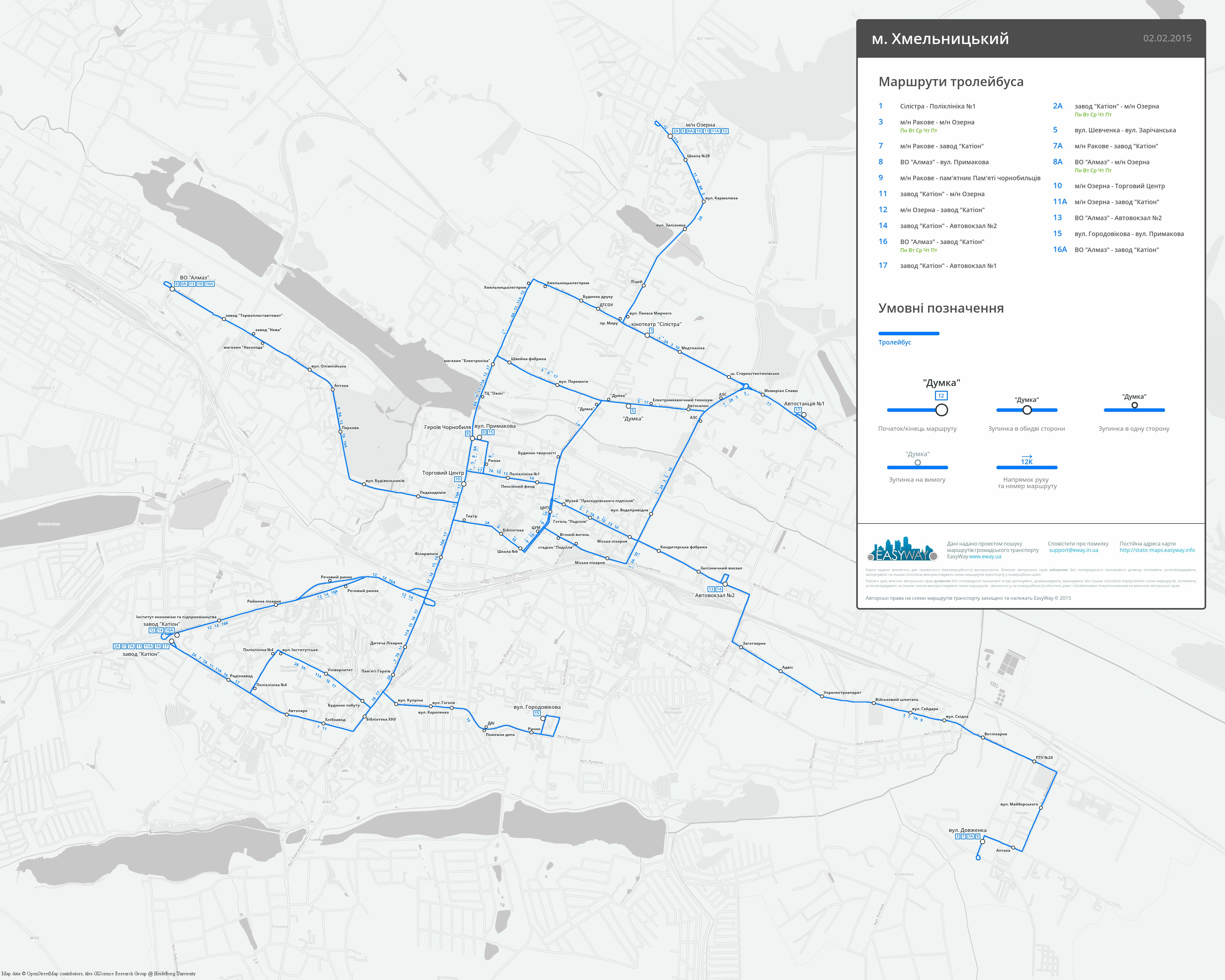
Trolleybus route map from 2015.

Khmelnytskyi has a trolleybus system which is operated by the municipal enterprise KP "Elektrotrans". Construction of the depot for the network first began in 1968, which was followed by the network in 1970 under K.S. Karlov. The trolleybus system first operated on 24 December 1970 with a route from Kation plant to the railway station, with the fleet consisting of twelve Kyiv-6 trolleybuses from the Kyiv Electric Transport Plant (KZET). The line for route 1 was first extended in 1971 to School No. 9, with new routes following: 2 (in 1972), 3 (in 1973), 4 (sometime later, extended in 1990). By the early 2000s, Khmelnytskyi had 133 different trolleybuses currently in active service. In 2012, the number of routes was 19, and a 2024 survey by the state gave the system as having 99.8 km of network, one depot, 26 routes, and 10 traction substations. The annual ridership of the system is 14,837,596 as of 2022.

Like most cities, the fleet was replaced starting in the late 2010s. This first occurred in March 2018, when seven new Bohdan trolleybuses were introduced into the routes, and the older ZiU-9s were restored. Bohdan later leased ten T701s in 2019, which were able to run autonomously. As part of partnerships with other cities, second-hand Czech trolleys like Škoda 24Tr Irisbus and Škoda 25Tr were given to the city in 2022 and 2023. As part of a project with the European Bank for Reconstruction and Development, loans were also brought in for new trolleys and for revamping the depot, with the tender for the new trolleys being won by the domestic Chernihiv Bus Factory and Politekhnoservis (which works with retrofitting), who agreed to provide 42 trolleybuses, all of which would run autonomously. The first Etalon-T12240 arrived in April 2025, with 20 being delivered by September, and the last arriving in May 2026.

====== Current routes ======
As of 2021, the city operates twenty-six different routes for trolleybuses:

- Route No. 1: Silistra to Polyclinic No. 1
- Route No. 1A: Staromiska St. to Interregional Academy of Personnel Management
- Route No. 2A: Kation to Ozerna
- Route No. 3: Ozerna to Dovzhenka St.
- Route No. 4: Kation to Dovzhenka St.
- Route No. 4A: Kation to Dovzhenka St.
- Route No. 5: Shevchenka St. to Zarichanska St.
- Route No. 7: Kation to Dovzhenka St.
- Route No. 7A: Kation to Dovzhenka St.
- Route No. 8: VO "Almaz" to Staromiska St.
- Route No. 8A: VO "Almaz" to Ozerna
- Route No. 9: Zarichanska St. to Dovzhenka St.
- Route No. 10: Ozerna to Shopping Centre
- Route No. 11: Kation to Ozerna
- Route No. 11A: Kation to Ozerna
- Route No. 12: Kation to Ozerna
- Route No. 13: VO "Almaz" to Dovzhenka St.
- Route No. 14: Kation to Bus Station No. 2
- Route No. 15: Staromiska St. to P. Bolbochan St.
- Route No. 15A: P. Bolbochan St. to Bus Station No. 2
- Route No. 16: Kation to VO "Almaz"
- Route No. 17: Kation to Bus Station No. 1
- Route No. 18: VO "Almaz" to Bus Station No. 1
- Route No. 19: Kamianetska St. to Dovzhenka St.
- Route No. 20: Ozerna to Staromiska St.
- Route No. 56: VO "Almaz" to Bus Station No. 1
- Route No. 57: VO "Almaz" to P. Bolbochan St.

===== City buses =====
Minibus on Proskurivska Street in 2005.

Khmelnytskyi has both suburban city buses and intercity bus service alongside Marshrutkas operating within the city. The municipal enterprise for city buses, KP "Elektrotrans", has 10 routes with 13 buses as of 2012. Another enterprise, the enterprise for the organisation of city passenger transport, organises 40 routes with 387 vehicles. There are three main bus stations for intercity routes. The first is Bus Station No. 1 at Vinnytske Shosse 23, which is the largest, with 180 destinations, including most nearby domestic cities, and is a stop for international routes to Warsaw, Kraków, and Prague. The second is Bus Station No. 2 at Shevchenka Street 66, which serves 114 destinations and mainly operates domestic routes, most of which are to Kyiv. The third is Bus Station No. 3 at Prymakova Street 29, which serves 61 destinations, mostly suburban routes.

===== Former trams =====
Khmelnytskyi itself never had a tram system, but it was continuously proposed over the years. The first attempt was in 1899, when the merchant Davyd Nirenberg drew up plans for the construction of one after Zhytomyr, and Nirenberg pushed for electrifying the city to make one. It took until 1910 for a competition to electrify the city, during which Nirenberg also brought up the idea of a tram after electrification from Kamianetska Street to the railway station. Nirenberg's idea was shot down by the proposal of engineer Elem-Nisan Rabinovych, who did not consider a tram during electrification. The closest thing to a tram was a German railcar from Khemlnytskyi to Hrechany that existed in the late 1800s to early 1900s, which locals called a tram.

==== Railways ====
The city's main railway station

Khmelnytskyi is a major stop on the Zhmerynka Directorate of Southwestern Railways, with traffic going through the electrified section of Zhmerynka to Hrechany (which is a neighbourhood of Khmelnytskyi). Thus, it has connections to almost every other major city domestically. As of 2018, the city handles 1.8 million long-distance railway passengers a year, making the Khmelnytskyi railway station the 9th busiest in Ukraine. The line from Khmelnytskyi to Lysychansk, which is provided by train No. 138/137, was also ranked as the second busiest line in the country at 950,800 passengers (after Uzhhorod to Lysychansk).

Railway service first began in the city in 1870, with a line from Zhmerynka to the city continuing on to Volochysk, with a station being built on the wasteland near the Letychiv road. Although initially the stop was only regional and did not have much traffic, renewed construction for the railway line began in the city in 1909 with the opening of Podilska Railway. Podilska opened a line to Shepetivka in 1913, one to Kamianets-Podilskyi in 1914, and to other cities in 1916. Hrechany, which was a village near Khmelnytskyi at the time but later annexed and incorporated as a neighbourhood, also got its own depot and freight station in 1914. After the war, the stations in the city were restored by 1924. The old main station for the city was demolished in 1951, and was replaced, with additional additions in 1984 of an office and ticket halls to increase the capacity of the station. The Zhmerynka to Khmelnytskyi line was electrified in 1997, with Pidvolochysk to Hrechany following in 1998. In February 2020, it was announced that the city's main railway station would be offered as a concession for 20 years because maintaining the station costs over 500 million hryvnias a year. The following year, it was announced that the station would be modernised to conduct high-speed rail to the border with Poland.

==== Air transport ====
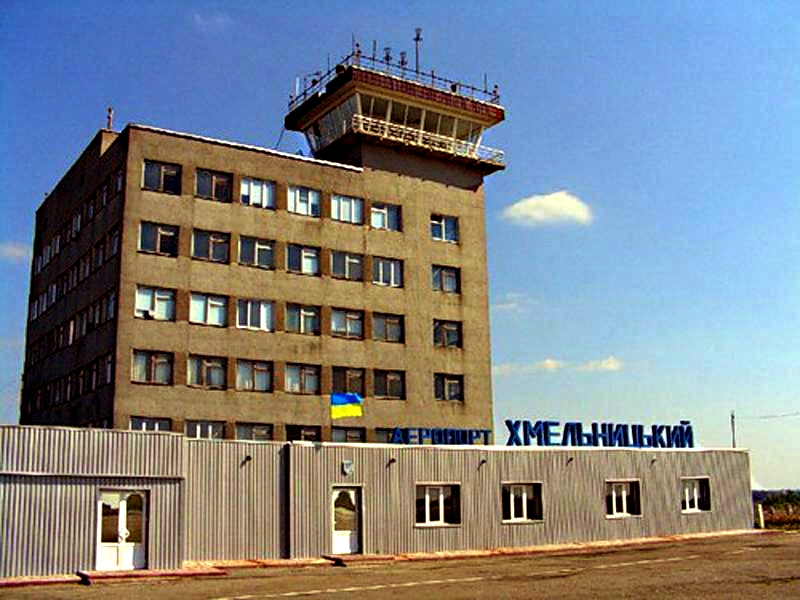
Passenger terminal of Khmelnytskyi Airport

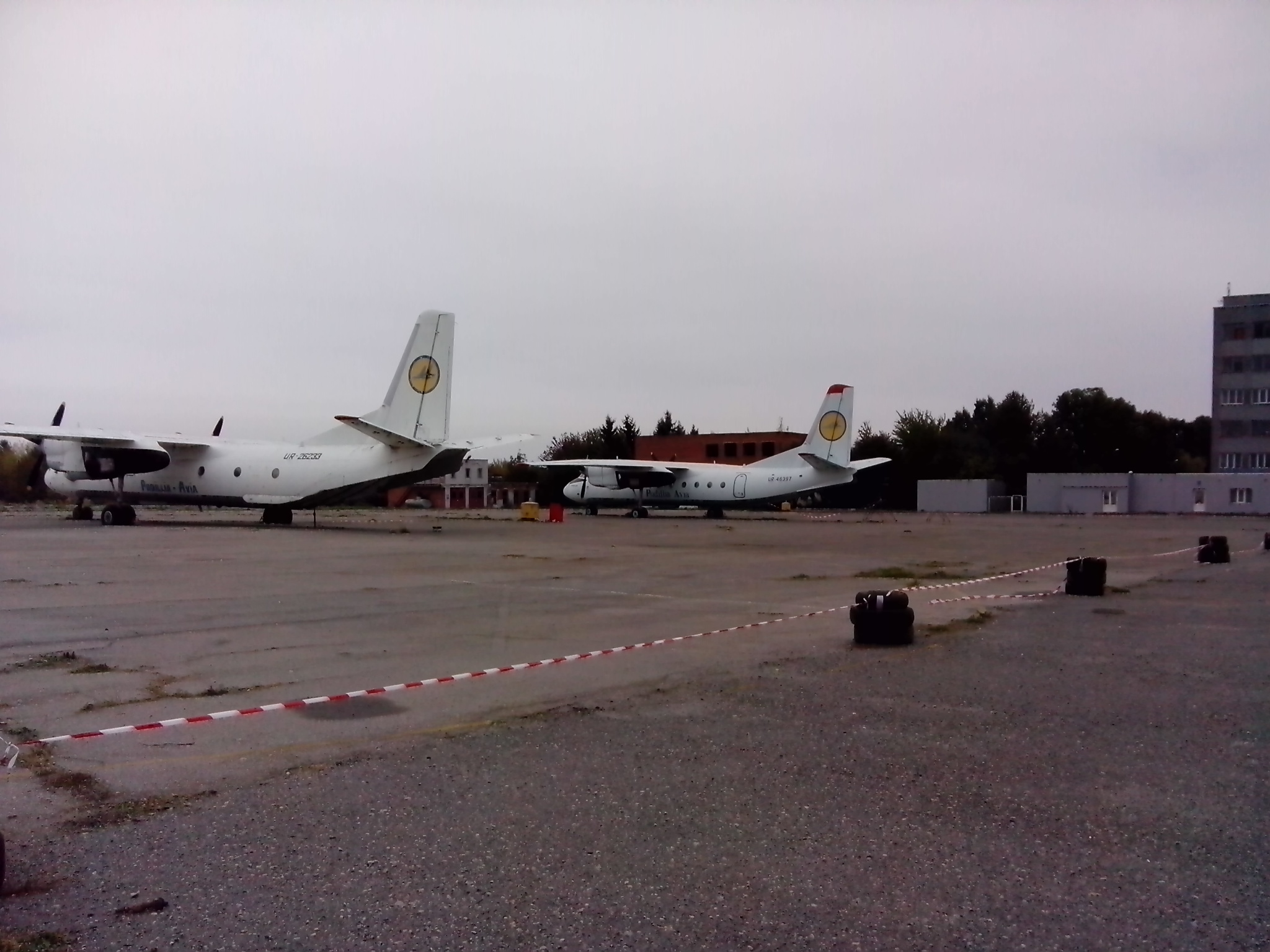
Some aircraft on the runway in 2015

The city is served by the Khmelnytskyi Airport. Prior to the airport, there was a separate squadron deployed in the city starting in 1952, which belonged to the 98th Detachment of the Chernivtsi Aviation Enterprise of the Ukrainian Civil Aviation Administration and had its own airfield. On the basis of the squadron and the airfield, an airport was eventually created, which launched its first flight (a Yak-40) in 1984. Eventually, at least by 1991, the airport had passenger terminals and a customs post. After independence, the airport fell into disrepair; the terminal was abandoned, and it was split between enterprises. Nevertheless, between 1994 and 2009, it still handled 80,000 passengers and 2,000 tons of cargo. It continued to hold a Class "B" certificate, which permitted small and medium planes, with the last international flight from the airport to Turkey, departing in 2010, and after this only An-2 aircraft occasionally flew from it. In 2012, the airport lost its flight certificate, and thus completely stopped flights. After three years, it was announced that there were going to be reconstruction plans, but in the end nothing happened.

In 2017, the oblast council announced an attempted revival of the enterprise, allocating millions of hryvnias, mostly for the enterprise's debts. The following year, the area was cleared of overgrowth, with work underway on repairing the runway, taxiway, and checkpoint. The runway was cleared for some An-2 and An-24 aircraft in October 2018, and the airport eventually signed an agreement to receive small aircraft in August 2018. The first of these occurred on 31 March 2019, and in February 2021 the State Aviation Service of Ukraine issued the re-inspection order. In the end, it was allowed to operate small aircraft, although it didn't get back its full certificate. After this, the oblast council approved more millions of hryvnias for the airport, with Nova Poshta being declared a potential cargo operator and a Turkish company being said to invest in a new terminal. However, all efforts were suspended in 2022, following the Russian invasion of Ukraine since Ukraine closed its airspace to civilian flights.

==== Roads and bridges ====
Road near Skibnevo station.

The international European route, which goes from Stryi to Kropyvnytskyi, crosses through the city. The Ukrainian international highway M30, which goes through the city's airport to Dnipro. Prior to its merger, M12 also passed through the city as a bypass at the airport. In terms of the T-network, the territorial route, the city is also connected to four roads: T-10-25 (which connects the city to Pereyaslav and is 40.2 km long), T-10-32 (which connects the city to Pereyaslav also and M-03 and is 19.4 km long), T-23-05 (which connects the city to Dashkivtsi and is 63 km long), and T-23-11 (which connects the city to Volochysk and is 59.5 km long). The city has a bypass road as part of M-30 on the southern and eastern parts of the city. The construction of another bypass road in the north is planned. There are also more than two dozen bridges in Khmelnytskyi. The longest, as of 2016, is an overpass on Zapadno-Okruzhnaya and is 200 metres long, the smallest is one over the drainage ditch on Horodna Street and is 9 metres long, the oldest is one over Starokostiantynivske Highway and is 72 years old, and the youngest is the overpass on Hrushevskoho Street and is 11 years old.

=== Energy ===
As Khmelnytskyi does not have a large CHPP, it uses small Cogeneration units, which were first installed in 2003. There were thirteen of these units before the Russian invasion, but since the invasion, this number has increased to 25. They are dispersed throughout the neighbourhoods and are linked together with cable networking and produce around 33.6 million kWh. There are also some solar power plants, 15 of them, which are mostly located on the roofs of cities. Heating is primarily organised by the enterprise "Pivdenno-Zakhidni teplomerezhi". The city has 70 different boiler houses, which are linked into a network, with some more remote boiler houses also being used just to keep the network from freezing.

=== Water and sanitation ===
Water supply and sewage are provided by the municipal enterprise ""Khmelnytskvodokanal", which was created on 7 September 1993. Most of the water comes from Chernelivka, although the city has reserves in case of emergeencies (Kudrianka, Tsentralna, Zakhidna, Pivdenna, Sharovechka). The city operates 70 wells, 9 water pumping stations, 387.34 km of sewage pipes, 24 sewage pumping stations, and 2 treatment sites.

=== Medicine ===
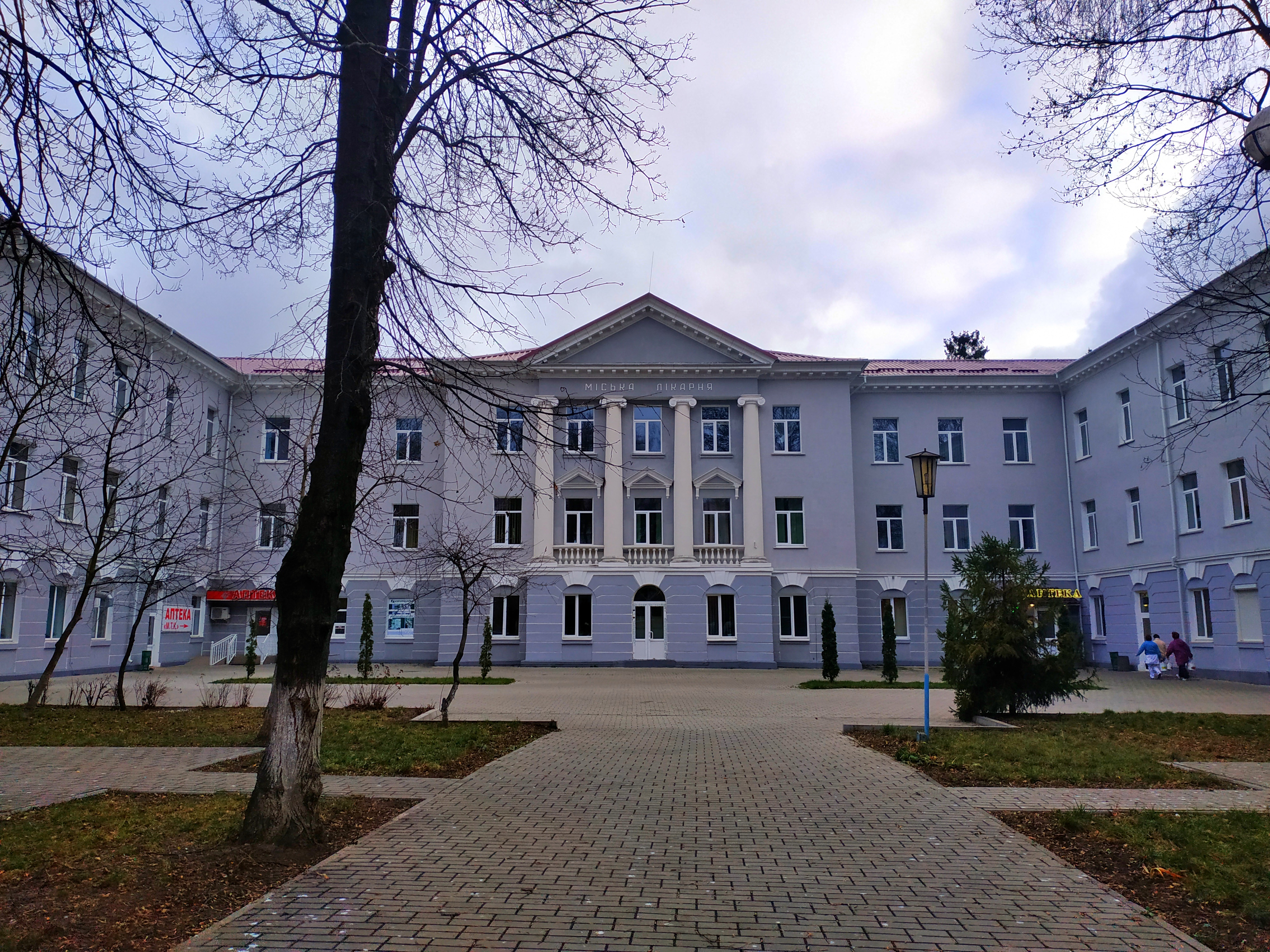
Khmelnytskyi City Hospital

There are seven city hospitals. Some of them are: the City Hospital, Infectious Diseases Hospital, Perinatal Centre, and City Children's Hospital. There is also an oblast-wide Khmelnytskyi Regional Hospital. The regional hospital was formed in 1948, and recently it was combined with the Regional Centre for the Prevention and Control of AIDS, the Dermatovenereological Centre, and the Pathology Centre.

== Sports ==
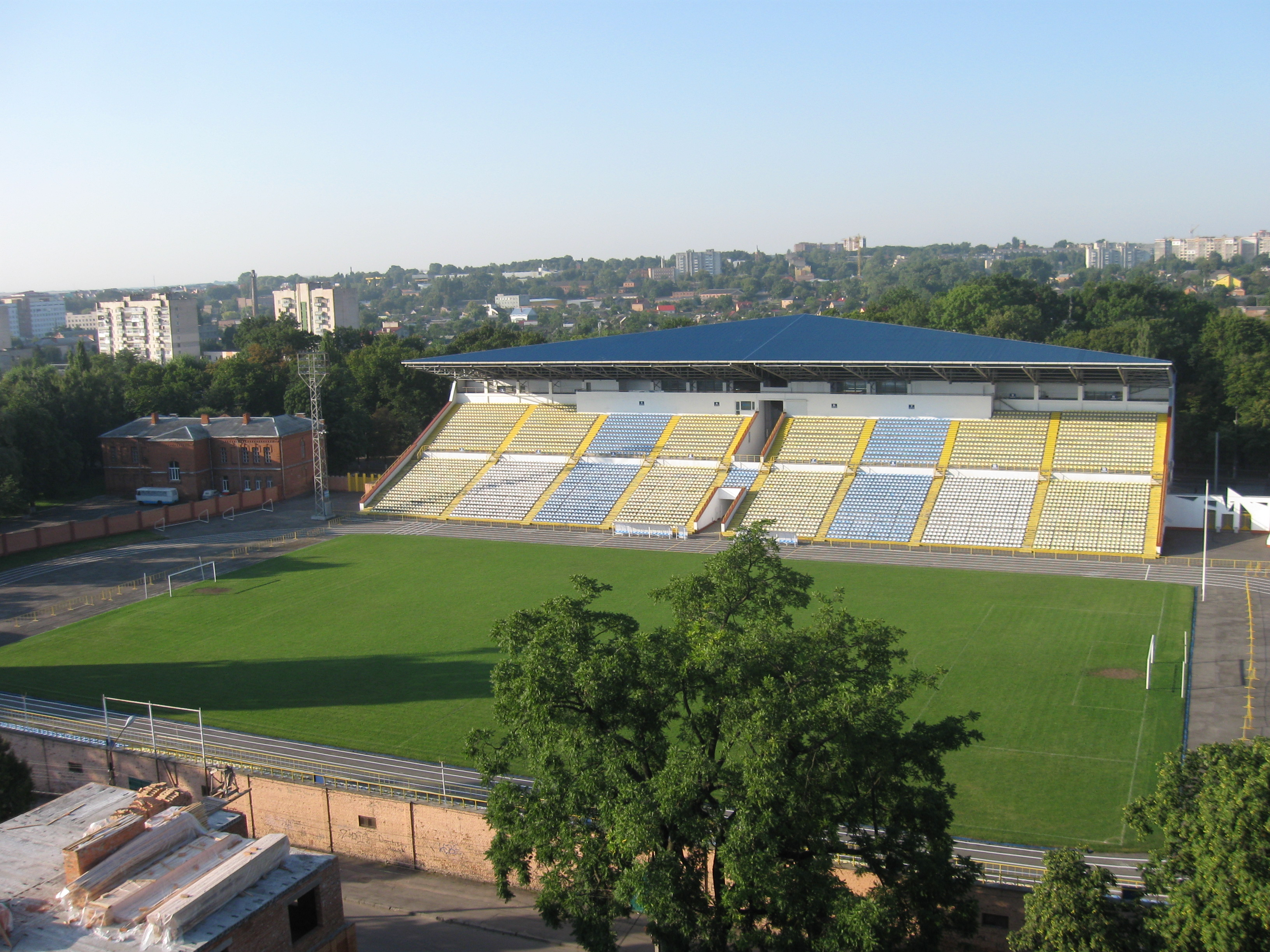
Podillya Stadium

Khmelnytskyi is home to the competitive football team FC Podillya Khmelnytskyi.

== Points of interest ==
- Proskurivska street, a modern central pedestrian street of the city, preserved buildings of the end of the 19th - the beginnings of 20th century in the styles of modernist, eclecticisms, Baroque, stone (characteristic only for Proskuriv).
- The house of the former Oleksiyivske real school (now it is the building of the City Executive Committee)
- The house of O. Brusilov (now is the House of Ceremonial events)
- The church of Nativity of the Virgin (the first stone construction in the city)
- The Protection cathedral
- St. George church
- Andriy Pervozvannyi church in "Dubovo" district

== Notable people ==
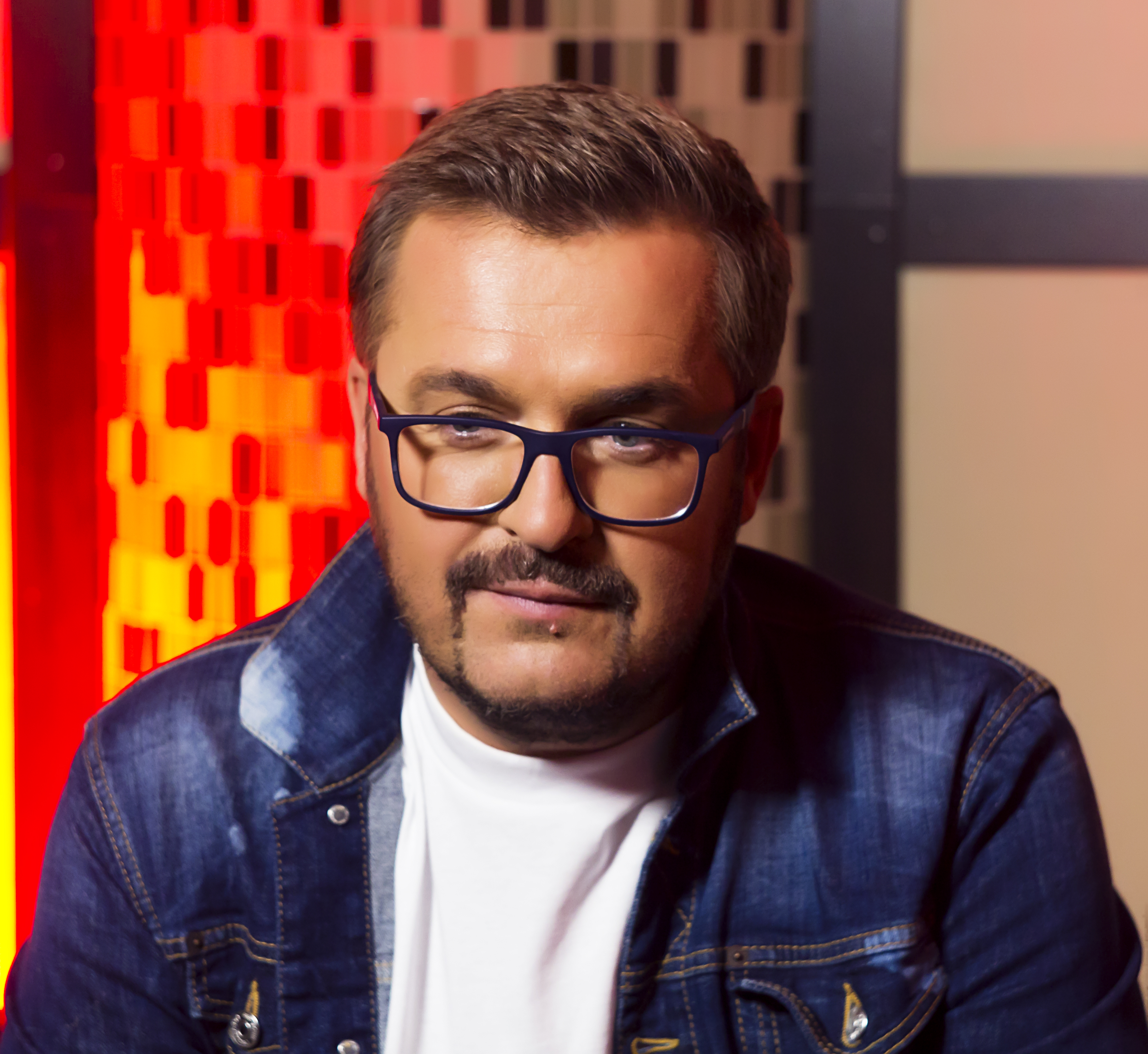
Oleksandr Ponomaryov, 2017

- Boris Berenfeld (born 1947), biophysicist
- Nellie Casman (1896–1984) an actress and singer in Yiddish theatre in New York.
- Ariel Durant (1898–1981) an American author and historian
- Svyatoslav Fyodorov (1927–2000) a Russian ophthalmologist, politician and professor
- Alberto Gerchunoff (1883–1950), Argentine author and journalist
- Max Husmann (1888–1965), Swiss peacemaker, helped Operation Sunrise in WWII
- Anatoly Kashpirovsky (born 1939), Russian psychotherapist and psychic healer
- Jack Liebowitz (1900–2000), an American accountant and co-owner of what became DC Comics
- Harry A. Marmer (1885–1953), American mathematician and oceanographer
- Mischa Mischakoff (1895–1981), American violinist, teacher, and conductor
- Lesia Nikitiuk (born 1987), Ukrainian TV presenter
- Oleksandr Ponomaryov (born 1973), Ukrainian singer
- Alexander Rutskoy (born 1947), Russian politician
- Oksana Shachko (1987–2018), Ukrainian artist and activist with FEMEN
- Alexandra Shevchenko (born 1988), FEMEN activist
- Maria Tuchka (born 1992), known professionally as Tucha, Ukrainian singer-songwriter and record producer
- Mikhail Tsekhanovsky (1889—1965) artist, animation director, book illustrator, screenwriter and sculptor.
- Natalia Valevska (born 1981), Ukrainian pop and dance singer
- Alla Zahaikevych (born 1966) composer of contemporary classical music and performance artist.
- Klemens Zamoyski (1738–1767) a Polish nobleman and 8th Ordynat of Zamość estate
- Tomasz Józef Zamoyski (1678–1725) a Polish nobleman and the 5th Ordynat of Zamość estate.

=== Sport ===
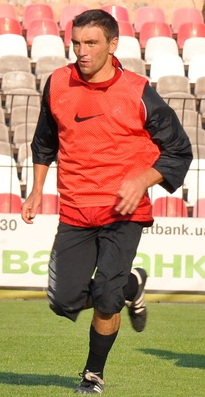
Ruslan Kostyshyn, 2011

- Vitaliy Balytskyi (1978–2018) a Ukrainian football player with 297 club caps
- Dmytro Bezotosnyi (born 1983) a Ukrainian football goalkeeper with over 300 club caps.
- Lyudmyla Holovchenko (born 1978) a retired amateur Ukrainian freestyle wrestler
- Dmytro Ianchuk (born 1992) sprint canoeist and bronze medallist at the 2016 Summer Olympics
- Andriy Kirlik (born 1974) footballer with over 350 club caps and an ordained deacon
- Ruslan Kostyshyn (born 1977) a Ukrainian retired footballer with 547 club caps
- Leonid Krupnik (born 1979) an American-Israeli former soccer player with over 300 club caps, and current coach.
- Oksana Masters (born 1989), American Paralympic rower and cross-country skier
- Serhei Nahorny (born 1956) sprint canoeist, silver and gold medallist at the 1976 Summer Olympics
- Vita Palamar (born 1977) a female high jumper from Ukraine.
- Serhiy Petrenko (born 1956) sprint canoeist, twice gold medallist at the 1976 Summer Olympics
- Olga Polyuk (born 1987), freestyle skier, specializing in aerials, three time Olympian.
- Bohdan Shershun (1981–2024), footballer with over 330 club caps and 4 for Ukraine

== International relations ==
=== Twin towns – sister cities ===
Khmelnytskyi is twinned with:

- Modesto, United States (1987)
- Silistra, Bulgaria (1992)
- Bor, Serbia (1995)
- Bălți, Moldova (1996)
- Kramfors, Sweden (1997)
- Ciechanów, Poland (1997)
- Aquascalientes, Mexico (2000)
- Šiauliai, Lithuania (2001)
- Manises, Spain (2002)
- Daliyat al-Karmel, Israel (2007)
- (Georgia (country)) Rustavi, Georgia (2016)
- Shijiazhuang, China (2019)
- Namangan, Uzbekistan (2021)
- Efeler, Turkey (2021)
- Sheffield, United Kingdom (2022)
- Prague 6, Czech Republic (2022)
- Tampa, United States (2026)

In addition, Khmelnytskyi also developed solidary partnership with Stuttgart and Dresden in Germany and Strasbourg in France.

In January 2016, the Khmelnytskyi city council terminated its twinned relations with the Russian cities Tver and Ivanovo due to the Russian military intervention in Ukraine (2014–present).

== Gallery ==
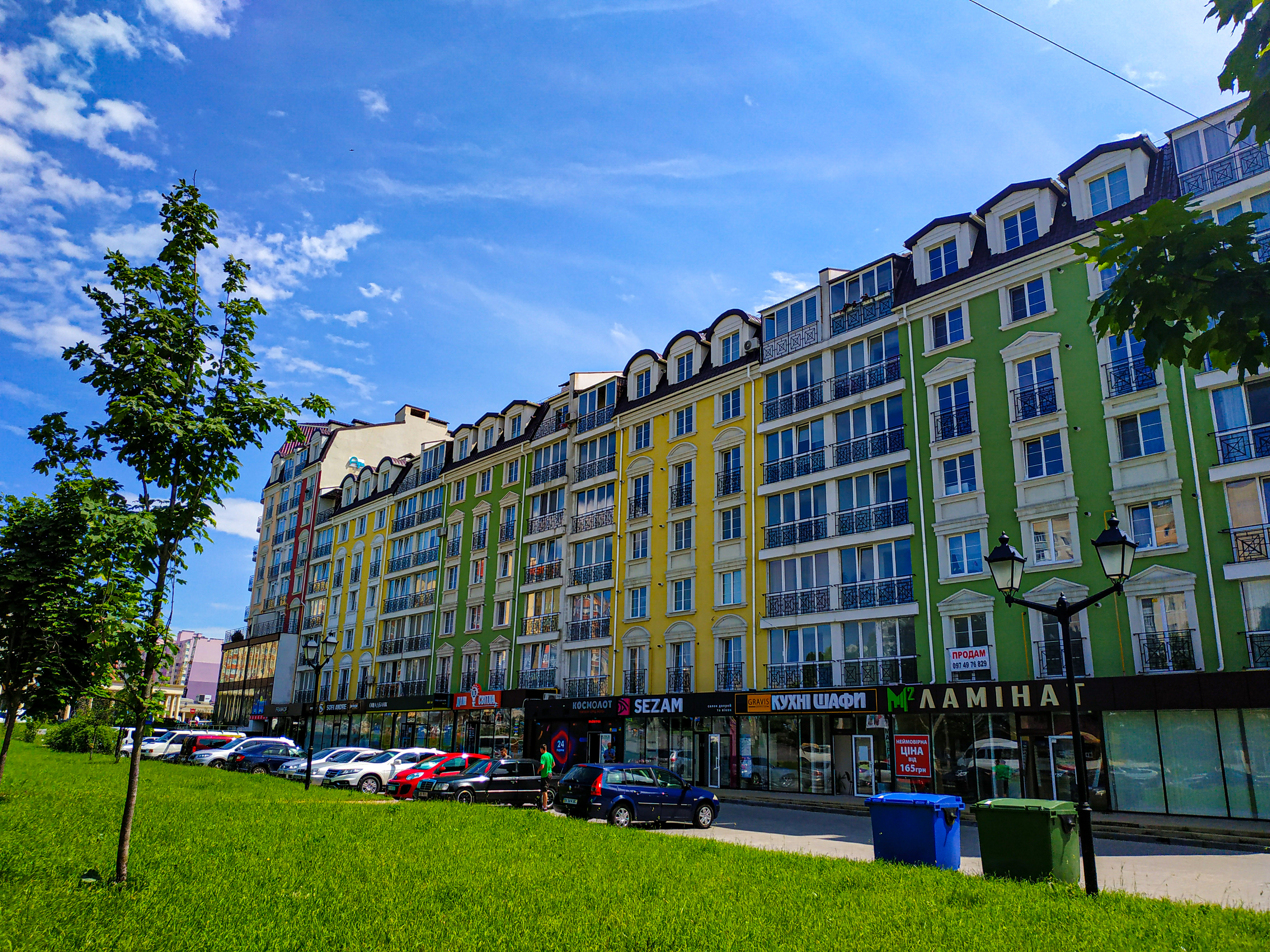
Panas Myrny Street

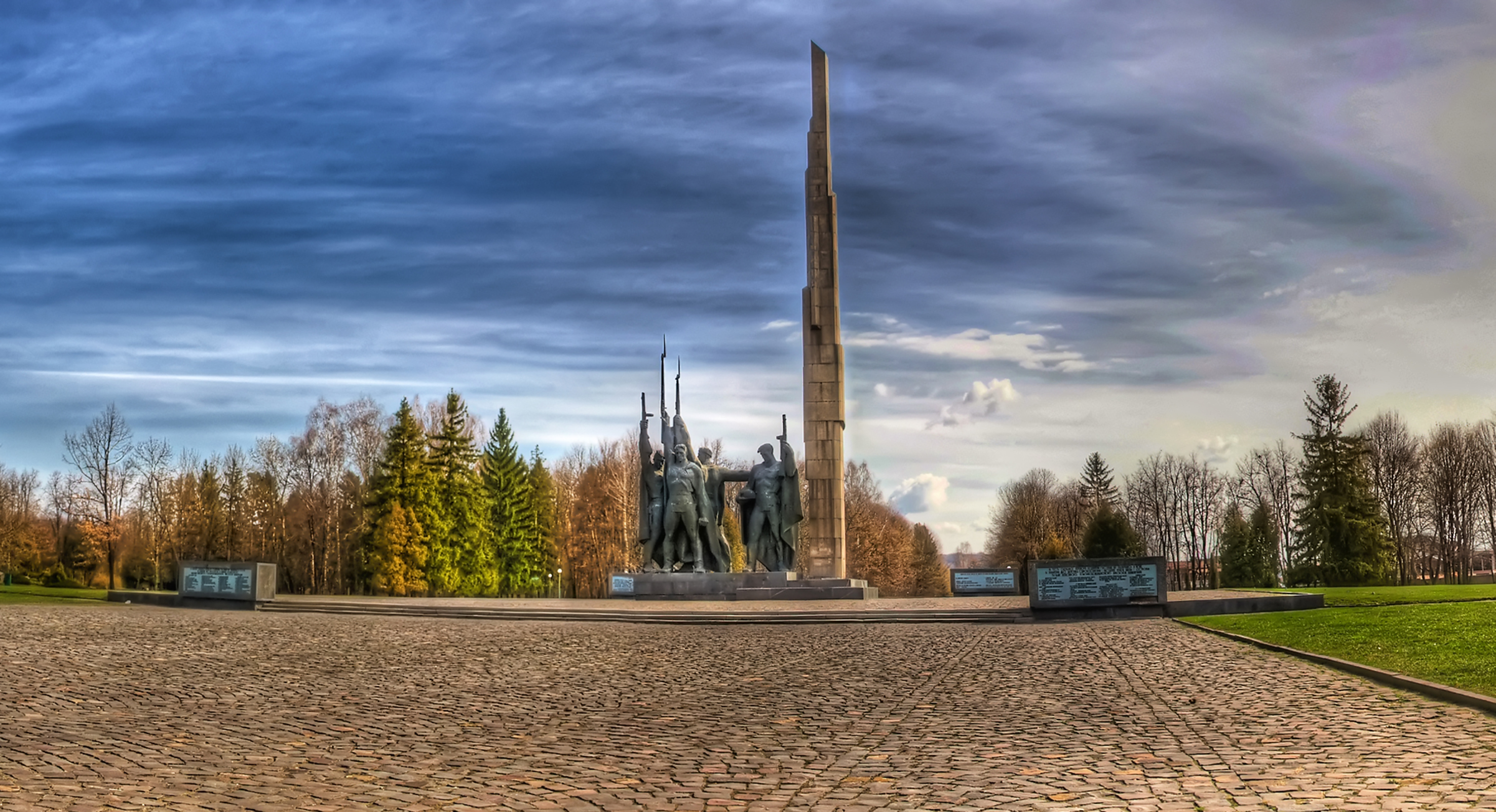
Arboretum

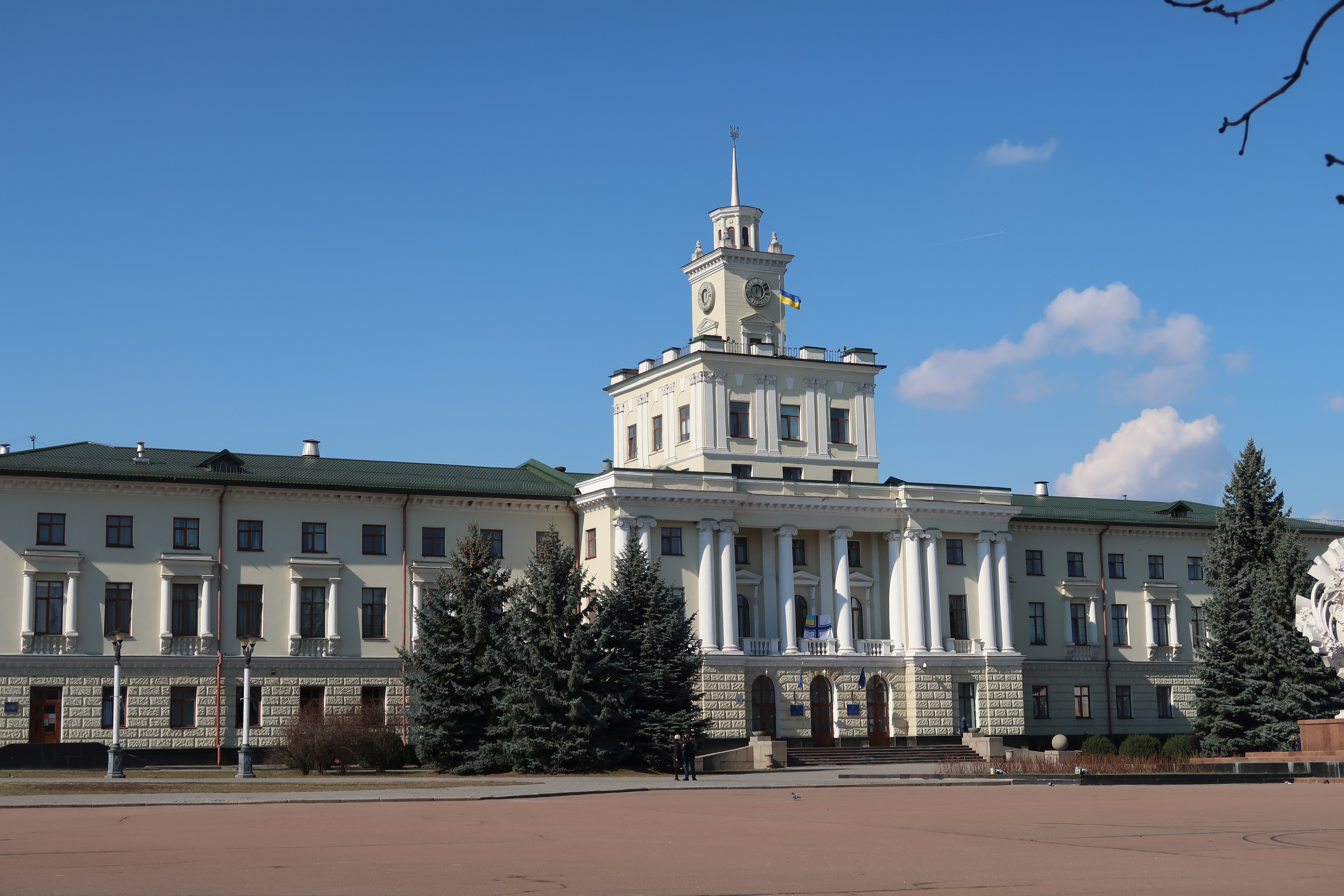
Main square

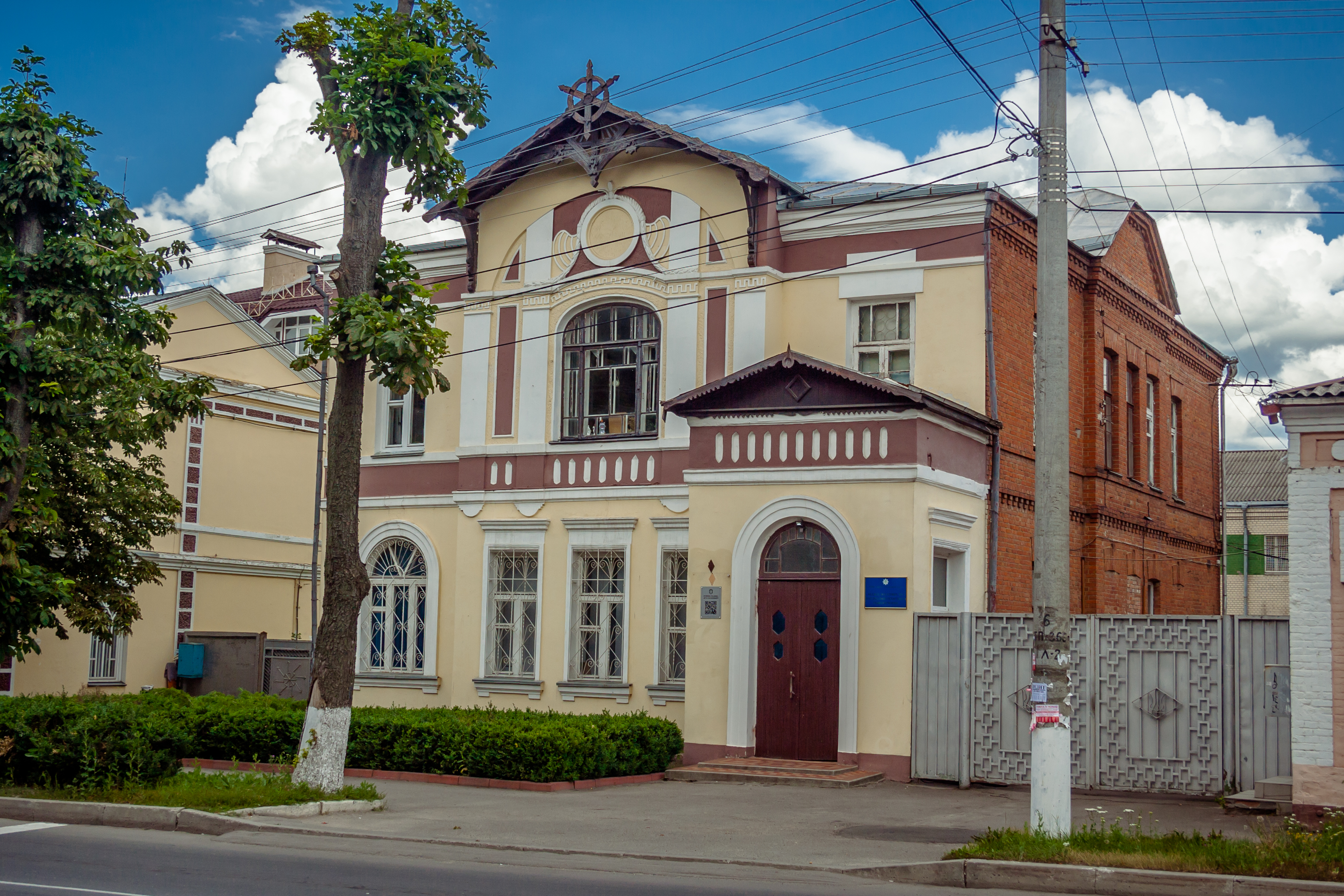
Manor at Hrushevskoho Street, 97

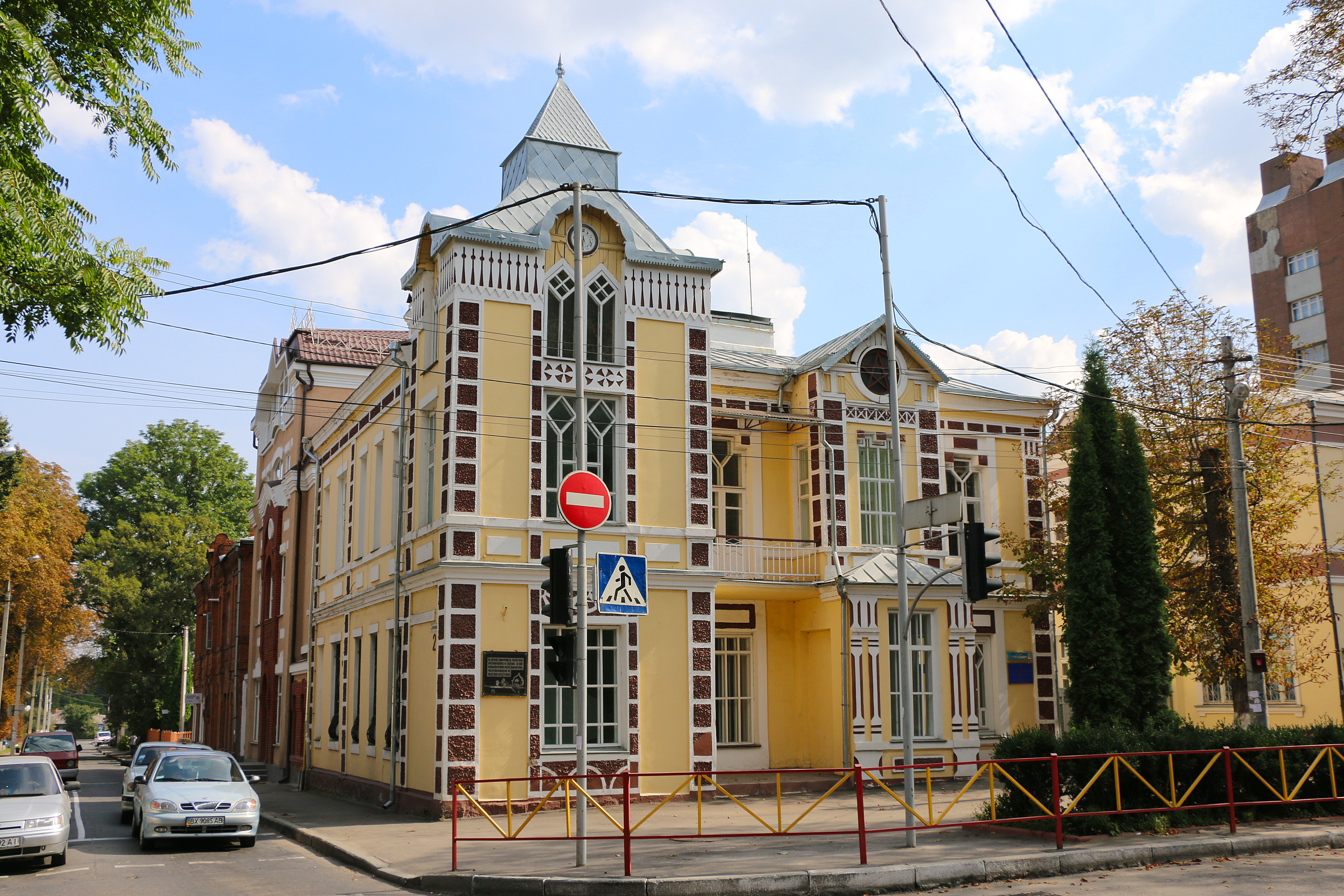
Former Headquarters of the 8th Cavalry Division of the Red Cossacks

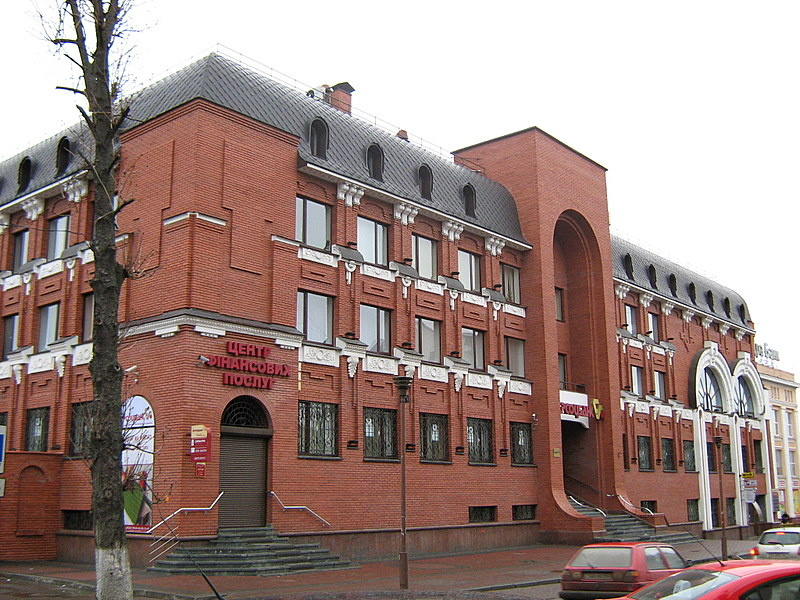
Bank building

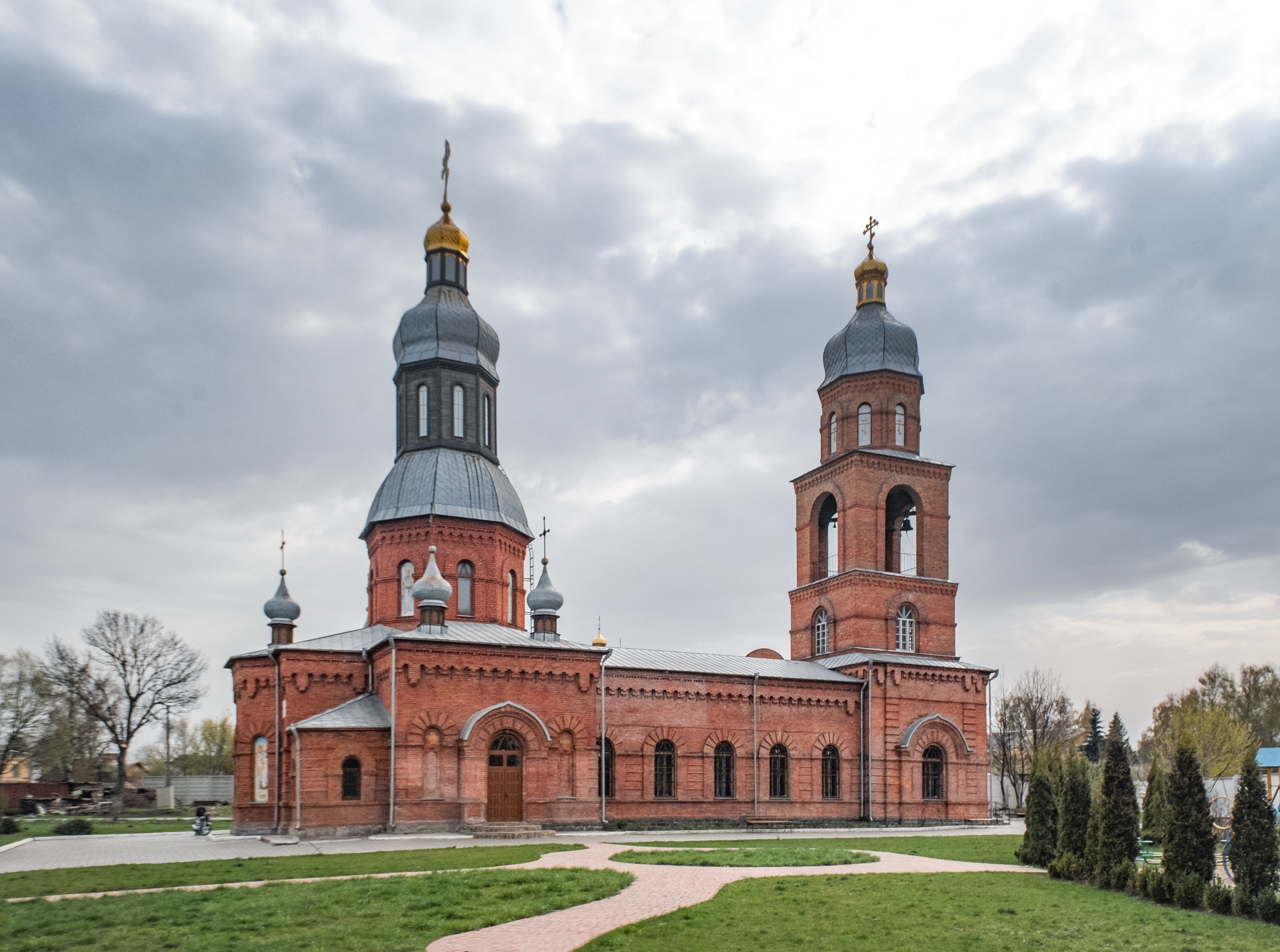
Saint George Cathedral

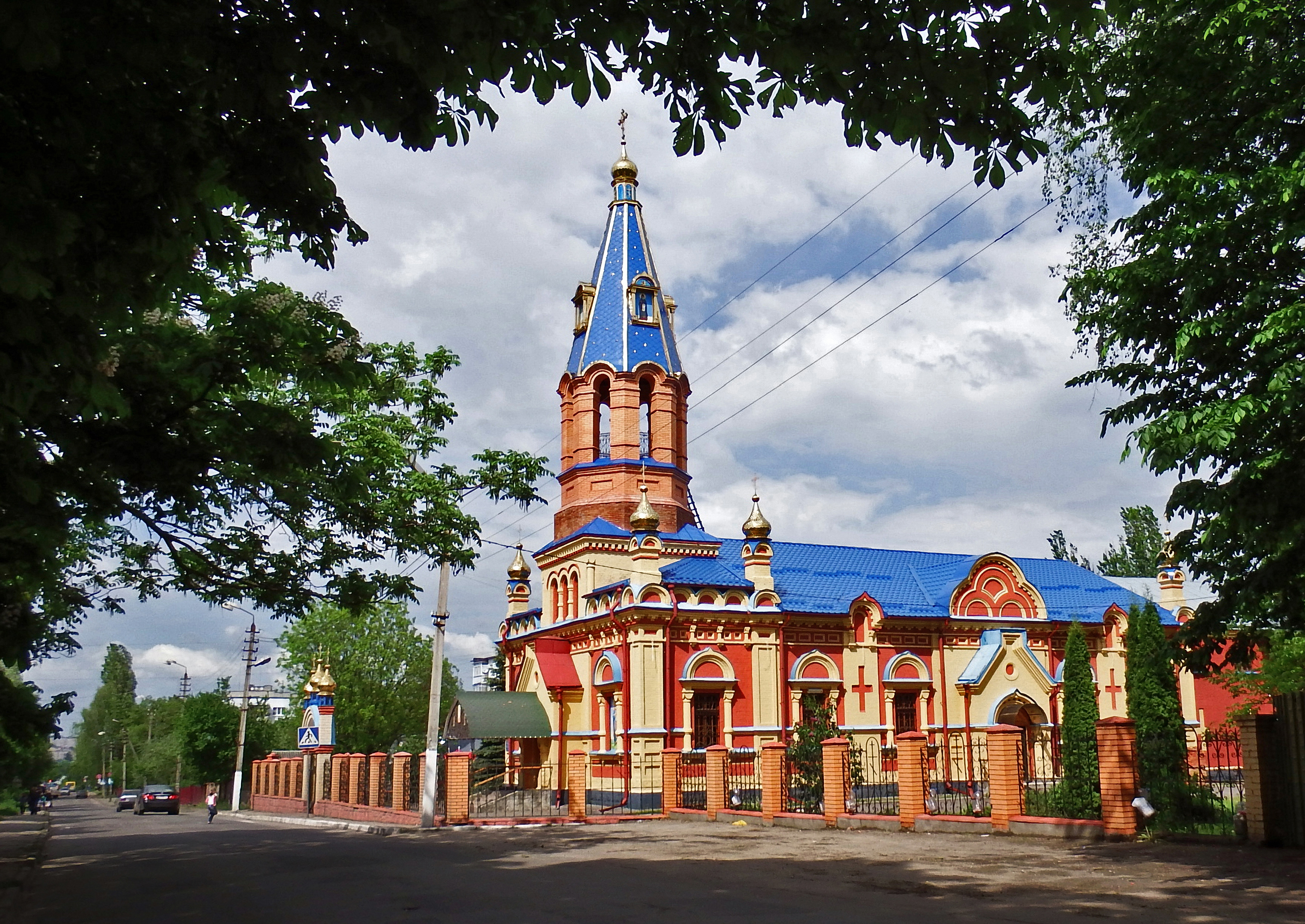
St. Andrew (Andriy Pervozvannyi) Church

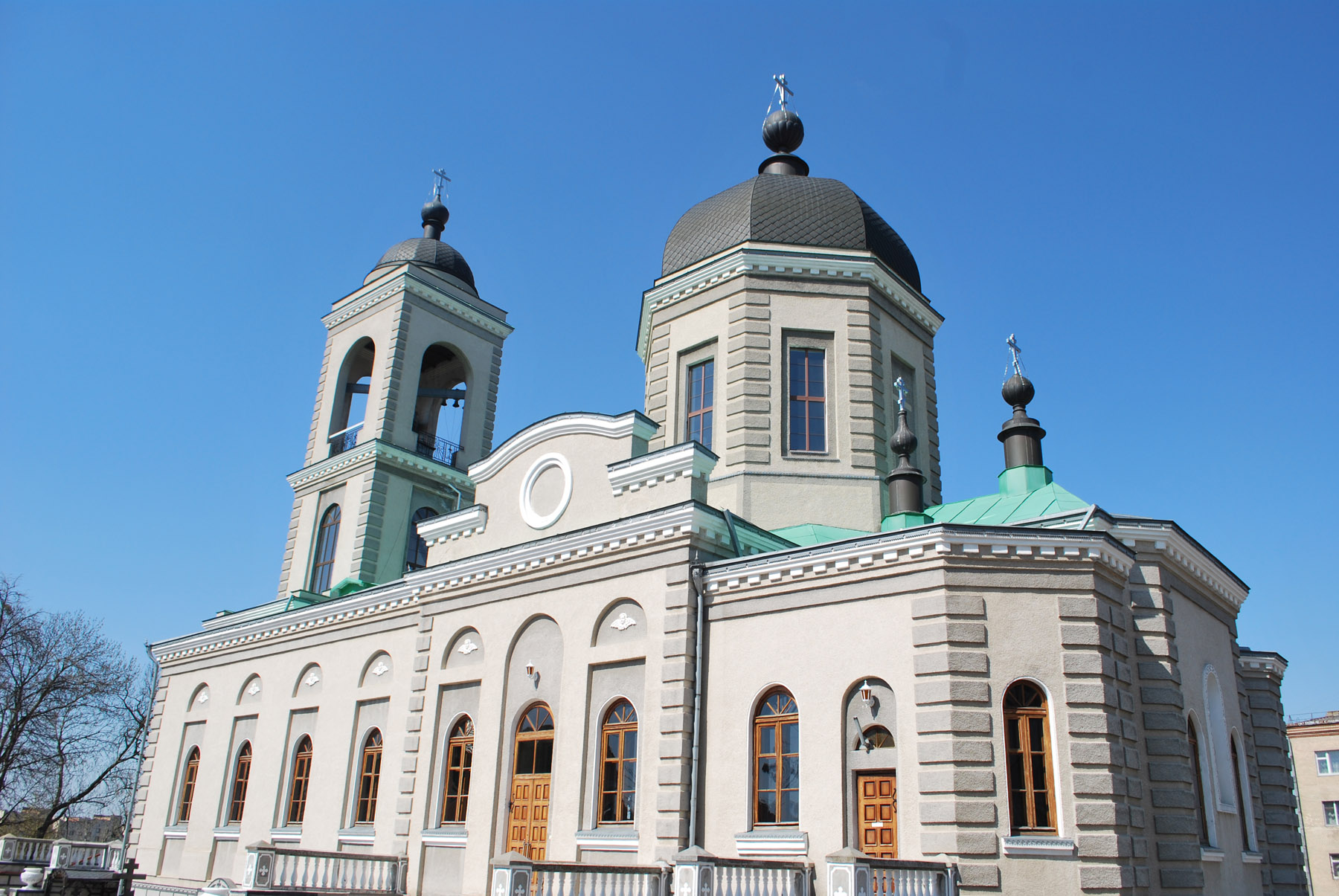
Protection Cathedral

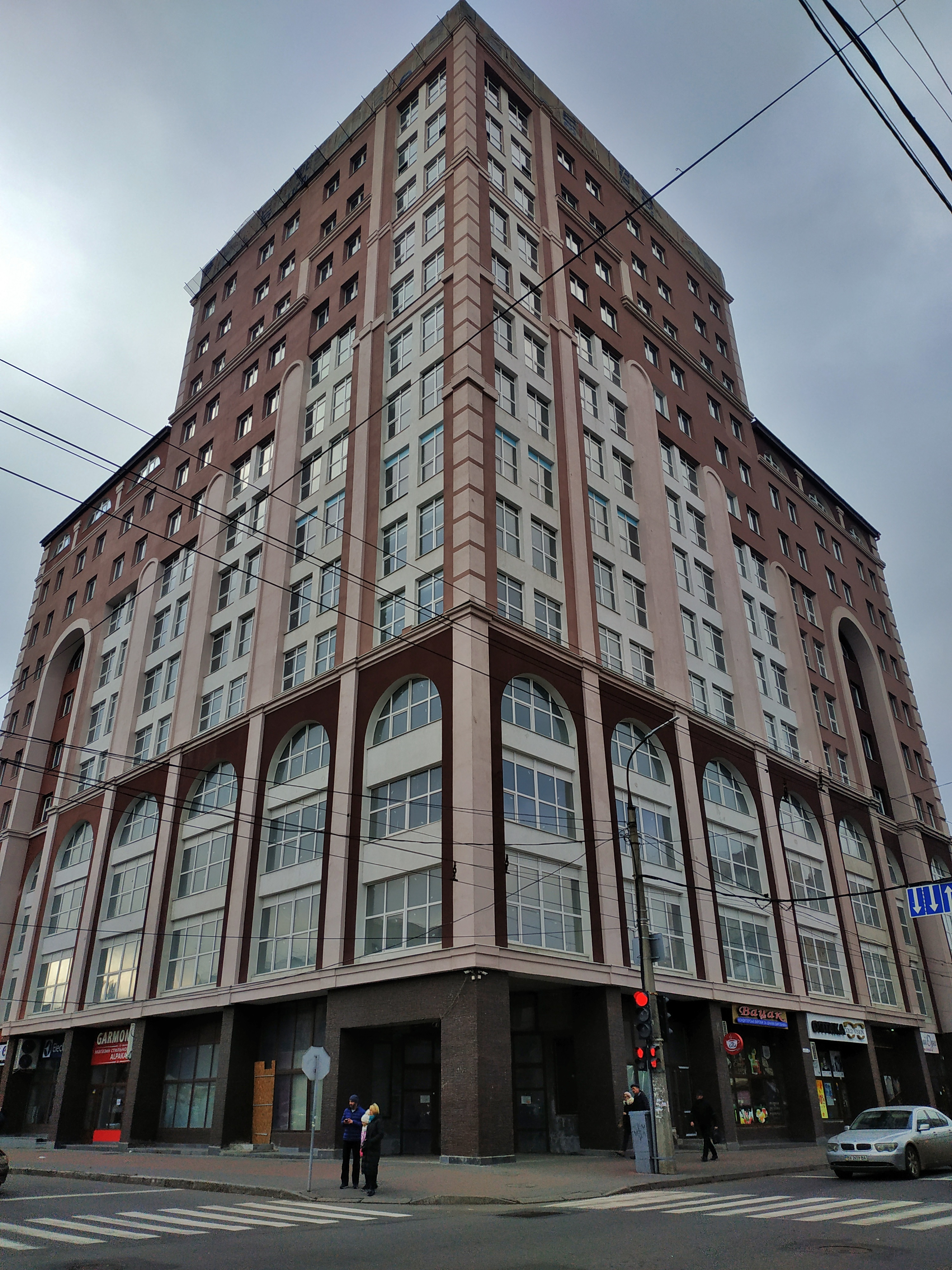
Podilska Street

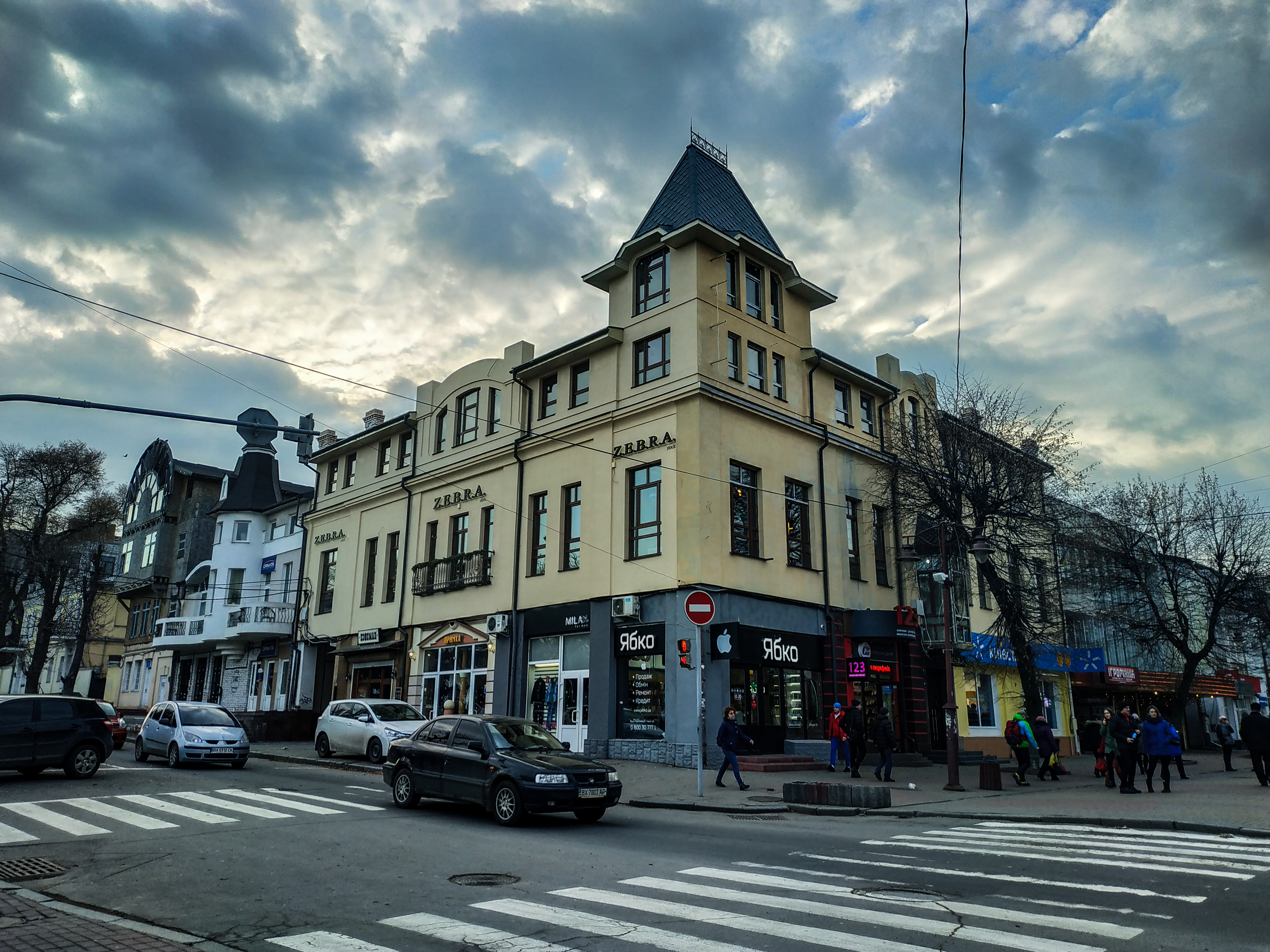
Proskurivska Street

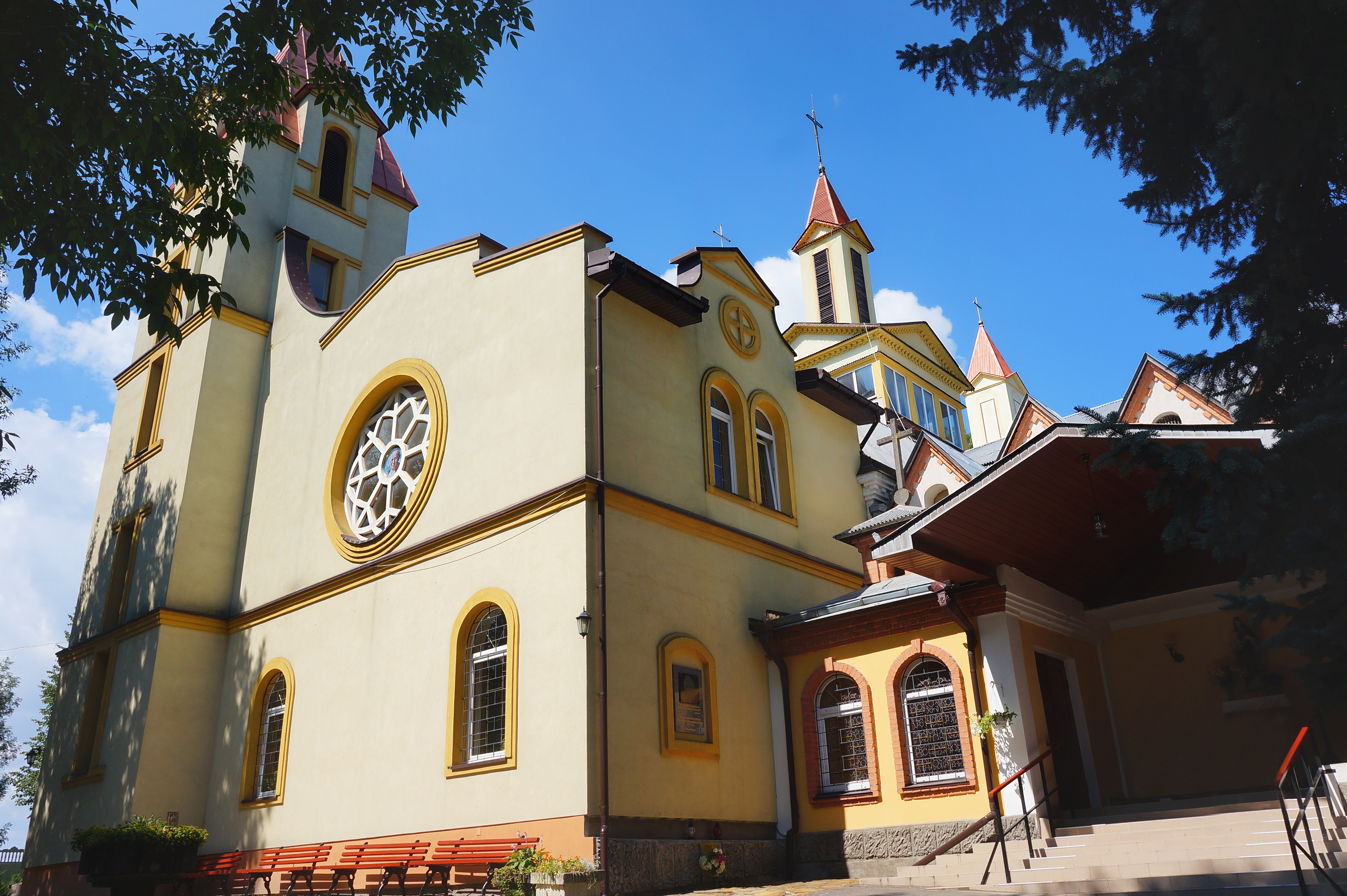
Church of St. Anne

== See also ==
- List of cities in Ukraine

== Sources ==
- Єсюнін, Сергій Миколайович (2012). Незнане Поділля. Видавництво «Бедрихів край».
- Єсюнін, Сергій Миколайович (2008). Прогулянка Проскуровом. Історичні нариси. Хмельницький обласний краєзнавчий музей.
- Мехеда, M.I. (1959). Поділля в роки громадянської війни (лютий 1918 р. — грудень 1920 р.). Вінницьке книжково-газетне видавництво.
- Тронько, П. Т. (1971). Історія міст і сіл Української РСР: Хмельницька область. Kyiv: Інститут історії Академії наук УРСР.
