= Tucha (singer) =

Ukrainian singer-songwriter (born 1992)

- Туча
- Born: Maria Tuchka; 23 April 1992 (age 34); Khmelnytskyi, Ukraine
- Occupations: Singer-songwriter; record producer
- Years active: 2018–present
- Musical career
- Origin: Kyiv, Ukraine
- Genres: Electronic; pop
- Instruments: Vocals; synthesiser
- Label: Independent

Maria Tuchka (Ukrainian: Марія Тучка), known professionally as Tucha (Туча, lit. 'rain cloud'; stylised in all caps), is a Ukrainian singer-songwriter and record producer.

== Early life ==
Tucha was born in Khmelnytskyi, where she was raised by her single mother. She enrolled in music school but dropped out, partly due to bullying from her teacher. She and her friends established a band in which she played the synthesisers and was the lead vocalist, though they broke up after their first rehearsal due to her insecurity about performing. The experience led her to abandon music for some time.

== Career ==
Tucha returned to music after learning about Ableton from electronic music producers. Feeling that it allowed her to experiment without fear of mistakes, she began her solo project in 2018. Her debut extended play (EP) Zlo (Зло; Evil) was released on 29 November 2019. Throughout 2020, she hosted a podcast about Ukrainian women in music titled Heroyky (Геройки; Heroines). Her second EP, Toksik (Токсік; Toxic), was released on 17 September 2021; its title is a pun on the word toxic and the Ukrainian word for juice (сік, sik). Later that year, she won the Young Blood (Jury Choice) Award at the 2021 Jager Music Awards organised by Jägermeister Ukraine.

Following the 2022 Russian invasion of Ukraine, Tucha released the song "Russia Is a Terrorist State" in August of that year. Its music video includes archival footage of the Holodomor, the Executed Renaissance, and other examples of anti-Ukrainian repression by Russia, as well as Russian actions against other countries such as Georgia and Syria. Slukh declared it the "main video of the war so far" at the time of its release. In March 2023, she began hosting the podcast Slay Show (Слей Шоу), produced by the Ukrainian public broacaster Suspilne, in which she discusses pop culture, social issues, and politics. On 31 May, she released the song "DekaDans" (ДекаДанс). Its title is a pun on the Ukrainian words for decadence and dance and its music video, which features members of the Armed Forces of Ukraine, aimed to raise funds for them. On 26 September, she released the song "Sleyerka" (Слеєрка; from the English slang term slay) in support of the LGBTQ community and a law proposal that sought to introduce civil partnerships in Ukraine. Her debut album Liryka moyeyi Lyubovi (Лірика моєї Любові; Lyrics of My Love) was released on 24 July 2025.

== Artistry ==
=== Influences ===
Tucha has stated that she is inspired by a wide range of music. She named Muse and Radiohead as her favourite bands, and said that she "adores" Benny Benassi. Other influences include the Knife, Boy Harsher, Stromae, La Femme, and French electronic music artists such as Sebastian and Justice, as well as Ukrainian music.

=== Musical and lyrical style ===
Tucha's work is rooted in electronic music. She has received comparisons to Charli XCX, but disagrees with them. Her debut EP Zlo was experimental and she consciously moved towards more traditional pop for its follow-up Toksik. She continued in that direction for later releases, citing a wish to make her music more accessible. She writes exclusively in the Ukrainian language. Her lyrics often tackle social and political issues, though she also writes about personal topics. She has written and produced much of her music alone and created many of her visuals herself; she co-produced her album Liryka moyeyi Lyubovi with Gloomfi.

== Personal life ==
Tucha resides in Kyiv. She is vegan. In 2022, she told the Ukrainian edition of Marie Claire that she identifies as sapiosexual. She believes that "an artist should be a role model" and has frequently expressed her political opinions. She described herself as "quite categoric" on some issues, such as her veganism and pro-Ukraine activism. She also supports feminism and LGBTQ rights, and has performed at Kyiv Pride.

== Discography ==
=== Studio albums ===
- Liryka moyeyi Lyubovi (2025)

=== Extended plays ===
- Zlo (2019)
- Toksik (2021)

=== Singles ===
Title	Year	Album
"Novorichna" (with Lyusi)	2020	Non-album single
"Ty vynna"	2021	Toksik
"M3X3"	2021	Toksik
"Nekrasyva"	2021	Non-album single
"Voyin"	2021	Non-album single
"Mesnyky"	2022	Non-album single
"Russia Is a Terrorist State"	2022	Non-album single
"Miy Vershe"	2023	Non-album single
"DekaDans"	2023	Non-album single
"Sleyerka"	2023	Non-album single
"Supersuka"	2024	Non-album single
"Besti"	2024	Non-album single
"Urahan"	2024	Non-album single
"Kometa"	2025	Liryka moyeyi Lyubovi
"Hard skill buty bich"	2025	Liryka moyeyi Lyubovi
"Come Back Klub"	2025	Liryka moyeyi Lyubovi
"Tebe-sebe"	2025	Non-album single
"Miy Vershe" (dirty version)	2026	Non-album single
