= Mohsenabad =

Mohsenabad (Persian: محسن اباد), also rendered as Muhsinabad, may refer to:

== Alborz Province ==
- Mohsenabad, Alborz

== East Azerbaijan Province ==
- Mohsenabad, Malekan, a village in Malekan County
- Mohsenabad, Maragheh, a village in Maragheh County
- Mohsenabad, Sarab, a village in Sarab County

== Fars Province ==
- Mohsenabad, Fars, a village in Kazerun County

== Gilan Province ==
- Mohsenabad, Gilan, a village in Astaneh-ye Ashrafiyeh County
- Mohsenabad-e Pain, a village in Astaneh-ye Ashrafiyeh County

== Isfahan Province ==
- Mohsenabad, Isfahan, a village in Borkhar County

== Kerman Province ==
- Mohsenabad, Kerman, a village in Kerman County

== Markazi Province ==
- Mohsenabad, Ashtian, Markazi Province

== Mazandaran Province ==
- Mohsenabad, Mazandaran, a village in Neka County

== Razavi Khorasan Province ==
- Mohsenabad, Chenaran, Razavi Khorasan Province
- Mohsenabad, Fariman, Razavi Khorasan Province
- Mohsenabad, Mashhad, Razavi Khorasan Province
- Mohsenabad, Zeberkhan, Nishapur County, Razavi Khorasan Province
- Mohsenabad, Taybad, Razavi Khorasan Province

== Sistan and Baluchestan Province ==
- Mohsenabad, Sistan and Baluchestan, a village in Khash County

== Yazd Province ==
- Mohsenabad, Yazd, a village in Taft County

== Zanjan Province ==
- Mohsenabad, Zanjan, a village in Zanjan County
