= Gafsheh =

Gafsheh (Persian: گفشه) may refer to:

- Bala Mahalleh-ye Gafsheh
- Mian Mahalleh-ye Gafsheh
- Gafsheh-ye Lasht-e Nesha Rural District
