= Dubaj, Lasht-e Nesha =

Neighborhood in Gilan province, Iran

Dubaj Persian: دوباج
- Neighborhood
- Location within Iran
- Coordinates: 37°23′25″N 49°49′06″E
- Country: Iran
- Province: Gilan
- County: Rasht
- District: Lasht-e Nesha
- Rural District: Aliabad-e Ziba Kenar
- Village: Dovaj

Population (2016)
  - Total: 91
- Time zone: UTC+3:30 (IRST)

Dubaj (Persian: دوباج) (Note: Also romanized as Dūbāj) is a neighborhood in the village of Dovaj in Aliabad-e Ziba Kenar Rural District of Lasht-e Nesha District in Rasht County, Gilan province, Iran.

== Demographics ==
=== Population ===
At the time of the 2006 National Census, Dubaj's population was 157 in 46 households, when it was a village in Aliabad-e Ziba Kenar Rural District. The following census in 2011 counted 98 people in 33 households. The 2016 census measured the population of the village as 91 people in 30 households.

After the census, Dubaj merged with the village of Dovaj.
