= Dastak =

Dastak may refer to:

- Dastak (1970 film), a Hindi film
- Dastak (1996 film), a Hindi-language Indian film
- Dastak, Iran, a village in Dehgah Rural District, Gilan Province, Iran
- Dastak (trade permit) a permit given to European traders in India by Mughal emperors.
- Dastak (1986 TV series), a Pakistani television series
- Dastak (2025 TV series), a Pakistani television series
- Mohammad Ali Ramazani Dastak (1963–2020), Iranian politician
