= Lukh =

Lukh may refer to:

- Lukh, Gilan, Iran
- Lukh, South Khorasan, a village in Iran
- Lukh, Russia, an urban locality (a settlement) in Lukhsky District of Ivanovo Oblast, Russia
- Lukh (river), a river in Russia
