= Lasku =

Lasku or Lesku (Persian: لسكو), also rendered as or Laskooh, may refer to:

- Lasku Kalayeh
- Lasku Kalayeh-ye Lab-e Darya
