= Gildeh =

Gildeh گيلده
- Village
- Location within Iran
- Country: Iran
- Province: Gilan
- County: Astaneh-ye Ashrafiyeh
- Bakhsh: Central
- Rural District: kiashahr

Population (2006)
  - Total: 315
- Time zone: UTC+3:30 (IRST)
  - Summer (DST): UTC+4:30 (IRDT)

Gildeh (Persian: گيلده, also Romanized as Gīldeh; also known as Kīldeh) is a village in Kiashahr Rural District, in the Central District of Astaneh-ye Ashrafiyeh County, Gilan Province, Iran. At the 2006 census, its population was 315, in 82 families.
