= Chapak =

Chapak or Chepak may refer to:

- Chapak-e Nazemi Mahalleh, village in Gilan, Iran
- Chapak-e Shafi Mahalleh, village in Gilan, Iran
- Chapak Rud, village in Mazandaran, Iran
- Chhapaak or Chapak, 2020 Indian film
