= Dehsar =

Dehsar or Deh Sar (Persian: دهسر) may refer to:

- Deh Sar, Astaneh-ye Ashrafiyeh
- Dehsar, Ahandan, Lahijan County
- Deh Sar, Baz Kia Gurab, Lahijan County
- Dehsar, Rasht
