= Eshman =

Eshman (Persian: اشمان) may refer to:

== Places ==
- Eshman-e Dehgah
- Eshman-e Kamachal

== People ==
- Keith Eshman, Australian rugby league footballer

== See also ==
- Eshmanan, a term used in Kerala (south India) to refer to a feudal landlord
