= Now Bijar Mahalleh-ye Mohsenabad =

Now Bijar Mahalleh-ye Mohsenabad نوبيجارمحله محسن آباد
- Village
- Location within Iran
- Coordinates: 37°23′32″N 49°55′55″E
- Country: Iran
- Province: Gilan
- County: Astaneh-ye Ashrafiyeh
- Bakhsh: Kiashahr
- Rural District: Kiashahr

Population (2016)
  - Total: 227
- Time zone: UTC+3:30 (IRST)

Now Bijar Mahalleh-ye Mohsenabad (Persian: نوبيجارمحله محسن آباد, also Romanized as Now Bījār Maḩalleh-ye Moḩsenābād; also known as Now Bījār Maḩalleh) is a village in Kiashahr Rural District, Kiashahr District, Astaneh-ye Ashrafiyeh County, Gilan Province, Iran.

At the time of the 2006 National Census, the village's population was 211 in 60 households. The following census in 2011 counted 207 people in 71 households. The 2016 census measured the population of the village as 227 people in 81 households.
