= Amildan =

Village in Gilan province, Iran

Amildan Persian: اميلدان
- Village
- Location within Iran
- Coordinates: 37°24′48″N 49°51′18″E
- Country: Iran
- Province: Gilan
- County: Rasht
- District: Lasht-e Nesha
- Rural District: Aliabad-e Ziba Kenar

Population (2016)
  - Total: 179
- Time zone: UTC+3:30 (IRST)

Amildan (Persian: اميلدان) (Note: Also romanized as Amīldān and Āmīldān) is a village in Aliabad-e Ziba Kenar Rural District of Lasht-e Nesha District in Rasht County, Gilan province, Iran.

== Demographics ==
=== Population ===
At the time of the 2006 National Census, the village's population was 197 in 64 households. The following census in 2011 counted 166 people in 62 households. The 2016 census measured the population of the village as 179 people in 71 households.
