= Amir Kia Sar =

Village in Gilan province, Iran

Amir Kia Sar Persian: اميركياسر
- Village
- Location within Iran
- Coordinates: 37°24′33″N 50°00′15″E
- Country: Iran
- Province: Gilan
- County: Astaneh-ye Ashrafiyeh
- District: Kiashahr
- Rural District: Kiashahr

Population (2016)
  - Total: 918
- Time zone: UTC+3:30 (IRST)

Amir Kia Sar (Persian: اميركياسر) (Note: Also romanized as Amīr Keyāsar, Amīr Kīā Sar, Amīr Kīāsar, and Amīr Kīyasar) is a village in Kiashahr Rural District of Kiashahr District in Astaneh-ye Ashrafiyeh County, Gilan province, Iran.

== Demographics ==
=== Population ===
At the time of the 2006 National Census, the village's population was 1,135 in 336 households. The following census in 2011 counted 832 people in 272 households. The 2016 census measured the population of the village as 918 people in 340 households.
