= Tuchah-e Alman =

Village in Gilan province, Iran

Tuchah-e Alman Persian: توچاه المان
- Village
- Location within Iran
- Coordinates: 37°20′18″N 49°52′10″E
- Country: Iran
- Province: Gilan
- County: Rasht
- District: Lasht-e Nesha
- Rural District: Jirhandeh-ye Lasht-e Nesha

Population (2016)
  - Total: 396
- Time zone: UTC+3:30 (IRST)

Tuchah-e Alman (Persian: توچاه المان) (Note: Also romanized as Tūchāh-e Ālmān; also known as Too Chah, Toucha, Tūchā’, and Tūchāh) is a village in Jirhandeh-ye Lasht-e Nesha Rural District of Lasht-e Nesha District in Rasht County, Gilan province, Iran.

== Demographics ==
=== Population ===
At the time of the 2006 National Census, the village's population was 503 in 137 households. The following census in 2011 counted 371 people in 117 households. The 2016 census measured the population of the village as 396 people in 135 households.
