= Pas Bijar Gafsheh =

Pas Bijar Gafsheh پس بيجار گفشه
- Village
- Location within Iran
- Coordinates: 37°20′53″N 49°48′32″E
- Country: Iran
- Province: Gilan
- County: Rasht
- Bakhsh: Lasht-e Nesha
- Rural District: Gafsheh-ye Lasht-e Nesha

Population (2016)
  - Total: 312
- Time zone: UTC+3:30 (IRST)

Pas Bijar Gafsheh (Persian: پس بيجار گفشه, also Romanized as Pas Bījār Gafsheh) is a village in Gafsheh-ye Lasht-e Nesha Rural District, Lasht-e Nesha District, Rasht County, Gilan Province, Iran.

At the time of the 2006 National Census, the village's population was 374 in 118 households. The following census in 2011 counted 334 people in 123 households. The 2016 census measured the population of the village as 312 people in 118 households.
