= Fakhrabad, Gilan =

Village in Gilan province, Iran

Fakhrabad Persian: فخراباد
- Village
- Location within Iran
- Coordinates: 37°24′16″N 49°52′39″E
- Country: Iran
- Province: Gilan
- County: Rasht
- District: Lasht-e Nesha
- Rural District: Aliabad-e Ziba Kenar

Population (2016)
  - Total: 1,077
- Time zone: UTC+3:30 (IRST)

Fakhrabad (Persian: فخراباد) (Note: Also romanized as Fakher Abad and Fakhrābād) is a village in Aliabad-e Ziba Kenar Rural District of Lasht-e Nesha District in Rasht County, Gilan province, Iran.

== Demographics ==
=== Population ===
At the time of the 2006 National Census, the village's population was 1,236 in 379 households. The following census in 2011 counted 1,245 people in 430 households. The 2016 census measured the population of the village as 1,077 people in 370 households.
