= Salestan, Rasht =

Salestan سالستان
- Village
- Location within Iran
- Coordinates: 37°18′07″N 49°51′29″E
- Country: Iran
- Province: Gilan
- County: Rasht
- Bakhsh: Lasht-e Nesha
- Rural District: Jirhandeh-ye Lasht-e Nesha

Population (2016)
  - Total: 245
- Time zone: UTC+3:30 (IRST)

Salestan (Persian: سالستان, also Romanized as Sālestān; also known as Salasan and Salistan) is a village in Jirhandeh-ye Lasht-e Nesha Rural District, Lasht-e Nesha District, Rasht County, Gilan Province, Iran.

At the time of the 2006 National Census, the village's population was 208 in 64 households. The following census in 2011 counted 250 people in 86 households. The 2016 census measured the population of the village as 245 people in 97 households.
