= Sheykhan Gafsheh =

Village in Gilan province, Iran

Sheykhan Gafsheh Persian: شيخان گفشه
- Village
- Location within Iran
- Country: Iran
- Province: Gilan
- County: Rasht
- District: Lasht-e Nesha
- Rural District: Gafsheh-ye Lasht-e Nesha

Population (2016)
  - Total: 633
- Time zone: UTC+3:30 (IRST)

Sheykhan Gafsheh (Persian: شيخان گفشه) (Note: Also romanized as Sheykhān Gafsheh) is a village in Gafsheh-ye Lasht-e Nesha Rural District of Lasht-e Nesha District in Rasht County, Gilan province, Iran.

== Demographics ==
=== Population ===
At the time of the 2006 National Census, the village's population was 587 in 184 households. The following census in 2011 counted 691 people in 237 households. The 2016 census measured the population of the village as 633 people in 232 households.
