= Aji Buzayeh =

Village in Gilan province, Iran

Aji Buzayeh Persian: آجی بوزايه
- Village
- Location within Iran
- Coordinates: 37°20′53″N 49°47′21″E
- Country: Iran
- Province: Gilan
- County: Rasht
- District: Lasht-e Nesha
- Rural District: Gafsheh-ye Lasht-e Nesha

Population (2016)
  - Total: 602
- Time zone: UTC+3:30 (IRST)

Aji Buzayeh (Persian: آجی بوزايه) (Note: Also romanized as Ājī Būzāyeh; also known as Ājī Būrāyeh and Ḩājjī Bozāyeh) is a village in Gafsheh-ye Lasht-e Nesha Rural District of Lasht-e Nesha District in Rasht County, Gilan province, Iran.

== Demographics ==
=== Population ===
At the time of the 2006 National Census, the village's population was 746 in 215 households. The following census in 2011 counted 644 people in 215 households. The 2016 census measured the population of the village as 602 people in 207 households.
