= Limu Chah =

Village in Gilan province, Iran

Limu Chah Persian: ليموچاه
- Village
- Location within Iran
- Coordinates: 37°19′38″N 49°48′10″E
- Country: Iran
- Province: Gilan
- County: Rasht
- District: Lasht-e Nesha
- Rural District: Gafsheh-ye Lasht-e Nesha

Population (2016)
  - Total: 552
- Time zone: UTC+3:30 (IRST)

Limu Chah (Persian: ليموچاه) (Note: Also romanized as Limoo Chah and Līmū Chāh; also known as Līmūchā, Limucha, and Lunichi) is a village in Gafsheh-ye Lasht-e Nesha Rural District of Lasht-e Nesha District in Rasht County, Gilan province, Iran.

== Demographics ==
=== Population ===
At the time of the 2006 National Census, the village's population was 638 in 201 households. The following census in 2011 counted 577 people in 203 households. The 2016 census measured the population of the village as 552 people in 208 households.
