= Khoshk Estalkh =

Village in Gilan province, Iran

Khoshk Estalkh Persian: خشك اسطلخ
- Village
- Location within Iran
- Coordinates: 37°26′02″N 49°50′05″E
- Country: Iran
- Province: Gilan
- County: Rasht
- District: Lasht-e Nesha
- Rural District: Aliabad-e Ziba Kenar

Population (2016)
  - Total: 1,072
- Time zone: UTC+3:30 (IRST)

Khoshk Estalkh (Persian: خشك اسطلخ) (Note: Also romanized as Khoshk Esţalkh; also known as Estalkh, Khoseg Estelakh, Khosh Estalkh, Khoshk Eşţakh, Khoshk Estakhr, and Khushkasal’) is a village in Aliabad-e Ziba Kenar Rural District of Lasht-e Nesha District in Rasht County, Gilan province, Iran.

== Demographics ==
=== Population ===
At the time of the 2006 National Census, the village's population was 1,168 in 346 households. The following census in 2011 counted 1,166 people in 383 households. The 2016 census measured the population of the village as 1,072 people in 392 households.
