= Safra Basteh =

Village in Gilan province, Iran

Safra Basteh Persian: صفرابسته
- Village
- Location within Iran
- Coordinates: 37°20′18″N 49°58′26″E
- Country: Iran
- Province: Gilan
- County: Astaneh-ye Ashrafiyeh
- District: Kiashahr
- Rural District: Kiashahr

Population (2016)
  - Total: 1,242
- Time zone: UTC+3:30 (IRST)

Safra Basteh (Persian: صفرابسته) (Note: Also romanized as Şafrā Basteh) is a village in Kiashahr Rural District of Kiashahr District in Astaneh-ye Ashrafiyeh County, Gilan province, Iran.

== Demographics ==
=== Population ===
At the time of the 2006 National Census, the village's population was 1,258 in 338 households. The following census in 2011 counted 1,209 people in 377 households. The 2016 census measured the population of the village as 1,242 people in 414 households.
