= Pichah =

Pichah پيچاه
- Village
- Location within Iran
- Coordinates: 37°20′35″N 49°54′52″E
- Country: Iran
- Province: Gilan
- County: Rasht
- Bakhsh: Lasht-e Nesha
- Rural District: Jirhandeh-ye Lasht-e Nesha

Population (2016)
  - Total: 123
- Time zone: UTC+3:30 (IRST)

Pichah (Persian: پيچاه, also Romanized as Pīchāh; also known as Pīchā’) is a village in Jirhandeh-ye Lasht-e Nesha Rural District, Lasht-e Nesha District, Rasht County, Gilan Province, Iran.

At the time of the 2006 National Census, the village's population was 196 in 54 households. The following census in 2011 counted 132 people in 48 households. The 2016 census measured the population of the village as 123 people in 49 households.
