= Ju Posht, Rasht =

Ju Posht جوپشت
- Village
- Location within Iran
- Coordinates: 37°18′42″N 49°50′43″E
- Country: Iran
- Province: Gilan
- County: Rasht
- Bakhsh: Lasht-e Nesha
- Rural District: Gafsheh-ye Lasht-e Nesha

Population (2016)
  - Total: 251
- Time zone: UTC+3:30 (IRST)

Ju Posht (Persian: جوپشت, also Romanized as Jū Posht) is a village in Gafsheh-ye Lasht-e Nesha Rural District, Lasht-e Nesha District, Rasht County, Gilan Province, Iran.

At the time of the 2006 National Census, the village's population was 326 in 105 households. The following census in 2011 counted 294 people in 101 households. The 2016 census measured the population of the village as 251 people in 85 households.
