= Pain Mahalleh-ye Gildeh =

Village in Gilan province, Iran

Pain Mahalleh-ye Gildeh Persian: پائين محله گيلده
- Village
- Location within Iran
- Coordinates: 37°21′20″N 50°06′09″E
- Country: Iran
- Province: Gilan
- County: Astaneh-ye Ashrafiyeh
- District: Kiashahr
- Rural District: Dehgah

Population (2016)
  - Total: 323
- Time zone: UTC+3:30 (IRST)

Pain Mahalleh-ye Gildeh (Persian: پائين محله گيلده) (Note: Also romanized as Pā’īn Maḩalleh-ye Gīldeh; also known as Gīldeh-e Pā’īn and Pā’īn Maḩalleh-ye Geldeh) is a village in Dehgah Rural District of Kiashahr District in Astaneh-ye Ashrafiyeh County, Gilan province, Iran.

== Demographics ==
=== Population ===
At the time of the 2006 National Census, the village's population was 473 in 144 households. The following census in 2011 counted 406 people in 143 households. The 2016 census measured the population of the village as 323 people in 118 households.
