= Laleh Vajeh Sar =

Village in Gilan province, Iran

Laleh Vajeh Sar Persian: لله وجه سر
- Village
- Location within Iran
- Coordinates: 37°23′58″N 50°03′03″E
- Country: Iran
- Province: Gilan
- County: Astaneh-ye Ashrafiyeh
- District: Kiashahr
- Rural District: Dehgah

Population (2016)
  - Total: 408
- Time zone: UTC+3:30 (IRST)

Laleh Vajeh Sar (Persian: لله وجه سر) (Note: Also romanized as Laleh Vajh Sar; also known as Lāleh Bacheh Sar) is a village in Dehgah Rural District of Kiashahr District in Astaneh-ye Ashrafiyeh County, Gilan province, Iran.

== Demographics ==
=== Population ===
At the time of the 2006 National Census, the village's population was 528 in 163 households. The following census in 2011 counted 380 people in 133 households. The 2016 census measured the population of the village as 408 people in 149 households.
