= Estalak =

Village in Gilan province, Iran

Estalak Persian: اسطلك
- Village
- Location within Iran
- Coordinates: 37°21′07″N 49°50′03″E
- Country: Iran
- Province: Gilan
- County: Rasht
- District: Lasht-e Nesha
- Rural District: Gafsheh-ye Lasht-e Nesha

Population (2016)
  - Total: 616
- Time zone: UTC+3:30 (IRST)

Estalak (Persian: اسطلك) (Note: Also romanized as Esţalak) is a village in Gafsheh-ye Lasht-e Nesha Rural District of Lasht-e Nesha District in Rasht County, Gilan province, Iran.

== Demographics ==
=== Population ===
At the time of the 2006 National Census, the village's population was 595 in 176 households. The following census in 2011 counted 587 people in 196 households. The 2016 census measured the population of the village as 616 people in 238 households.
