= Ali Bozayeh =

Village in Gilan province, Iran

Ali Bozayeh Persian: علي بزايه
- Village
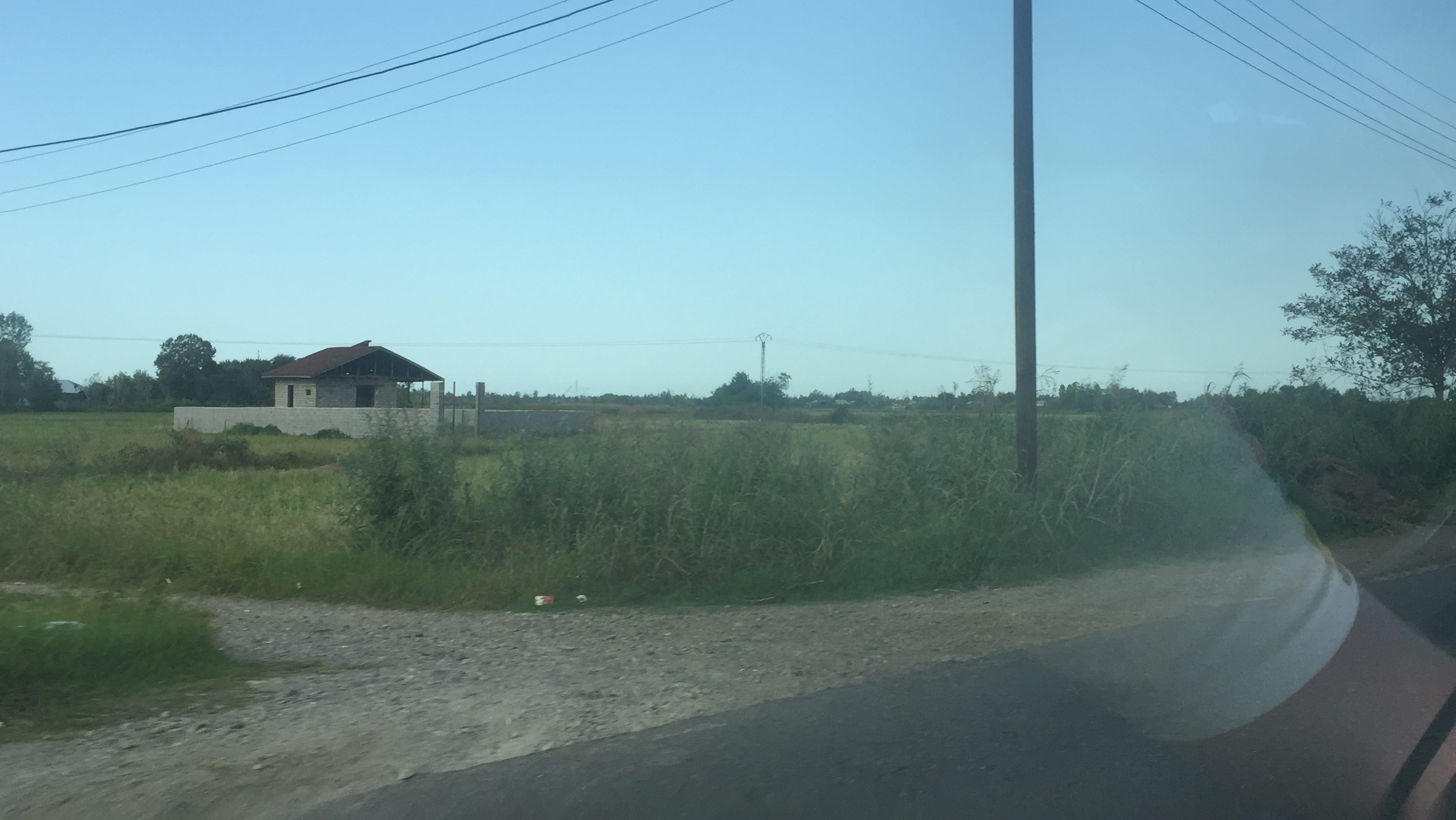

- Location within Iran
- Coordinates: 37°21′02″N 49°49′03″E
- Country: Iran
- Province: Gilan
- County: Rasht
- District: Lasht-e Nesha
- Rural District: Gafsheh-ye Lasht-e Nesha

Population (2016)
  - Total: 494
- Time zone: UTC+3:30 (IRST)

Ali Bozayeh (Persian: علي بزايه) (Note: Also romanized as ‘Alī Bozāyeh) is a village in Gafsheh-ye Lasht-e Nesha Rural District of Lasht-e Nesha District in Rasht County, Gilan province, Iran.

== Demographics ==
=== Population ===
At the time of the 2006 National Census, the village's population was 652 in 205 households. The following census in 2011 counted 475 people in 168 households. The 2016 census measured the population of the village as 494 people in 190 households.
