= Nowdeh, Rasht =

Village in Gilan province, Iran

Nowdeh Persian: نوده
- Village
- Location within Iran
- Coordinates: 37°24′06″N 49°49′03″E
- Country: Iran
- Province: Gilan
- County: Rasht
- District: Lasht-e Nesha
- Rural District: Aliabad-e Ziba Kenar

Population (2016)
  - Total: 707
- Time zone: UTC+3:30 (IRST)

Nowdeh (Persian: نوده) (Note: Also romanized as Nowdeh, Nudeh, and Nūdeh; also known as Nowdeh Bālā va Pā’īn and Nude) is a village in Aliabad-e Ziba Kenar Rural District of Lasht-e Nesha District in Rasht County, Gilan province, Iran.

== Demographics ==
=== Population ===
At the time of the 2006 National Census, the village's population was 918 in 296 households. The following census in 2011 counted 753 people in 278 households. The 2016 census measured the population of the village as 707 people in 269 households.
