= Dahaneh Sar =

Dahaneh Sar (Persian: دهنه سر) may refer to:

- Dahaneh-ye Sar-e Sefidrud-e Kohneh
- Dahaneh Sar-e Shijan
