= Chalekash-e Lat =

Village in Gilan province, Iran

Chalekash-e Lat Persian: چالكش لات
- Village
- Location within Iran
- Coordinates: 37°24′29″N 49°52′48″E
- Country: Iran
- Province: Gilan
- County: Rasht
- District: Lasht-e Nesha
- Rural District: Aliabad-e Ziba Kenar

Population (2016)
  - Total: 536
- Time zone: UTC+3:30 (IRST)

Chalekash-e Lat (Persian: چالكش لات) (Note: Also romanized as Chālekash Lāt and Chālekash-e Lāt) is a village in Aliabad-e Ziba Kenar Rural District of Lasht-e Nesha District in Rasht County, Gilan province, Iran.

== Demographics ==
=== Population ===
At the time of the 2006 National Census, the village's population was 559 in 167 households. The following census in 2011 counted 566 people in 197 households. The 2016 census measured the population of the village as 536 people in 184 households.
