= Dehgah, Astaneh-ye Ashrafiyeh =

Village in Gilan province, Iran

Dehgah Persian: دهگاه
- Village
- Location within Iran
- Coordinates: 37°22′27″N 50°03′58″E
- Country: Iran
- Province: Gilan
- County: Astaneh-ye Ashrafiyeh
- District: Kiashahr
- Rural District: Dehgah

Population (2016)
  - Total: 1,663
- Time zone: UTC+3:30 (IRST)

Dehgah (Persian: دهگاه) (Note: Also romanized as Dehgāh; also known as Dahka, Dehkā, and Dehkāh) is a village in, and the capital of, Dehgah Rural District in Kiashahr District of Astaneh-ye Ashrafiyeh County, Gilan province, Iran.

== Demographics ==
=== Population ===
At the time of the 2006 National Census, the village's population was 2,085 in 664 households. The following census in 2011 noted the population had deceased to 1,895 people in 657 households. The 2016 census measured the population of the village as 1,663 people in 633 households.
