= Iranian Architecture Documentary =

1983 TV documentary series about Iranian architecture

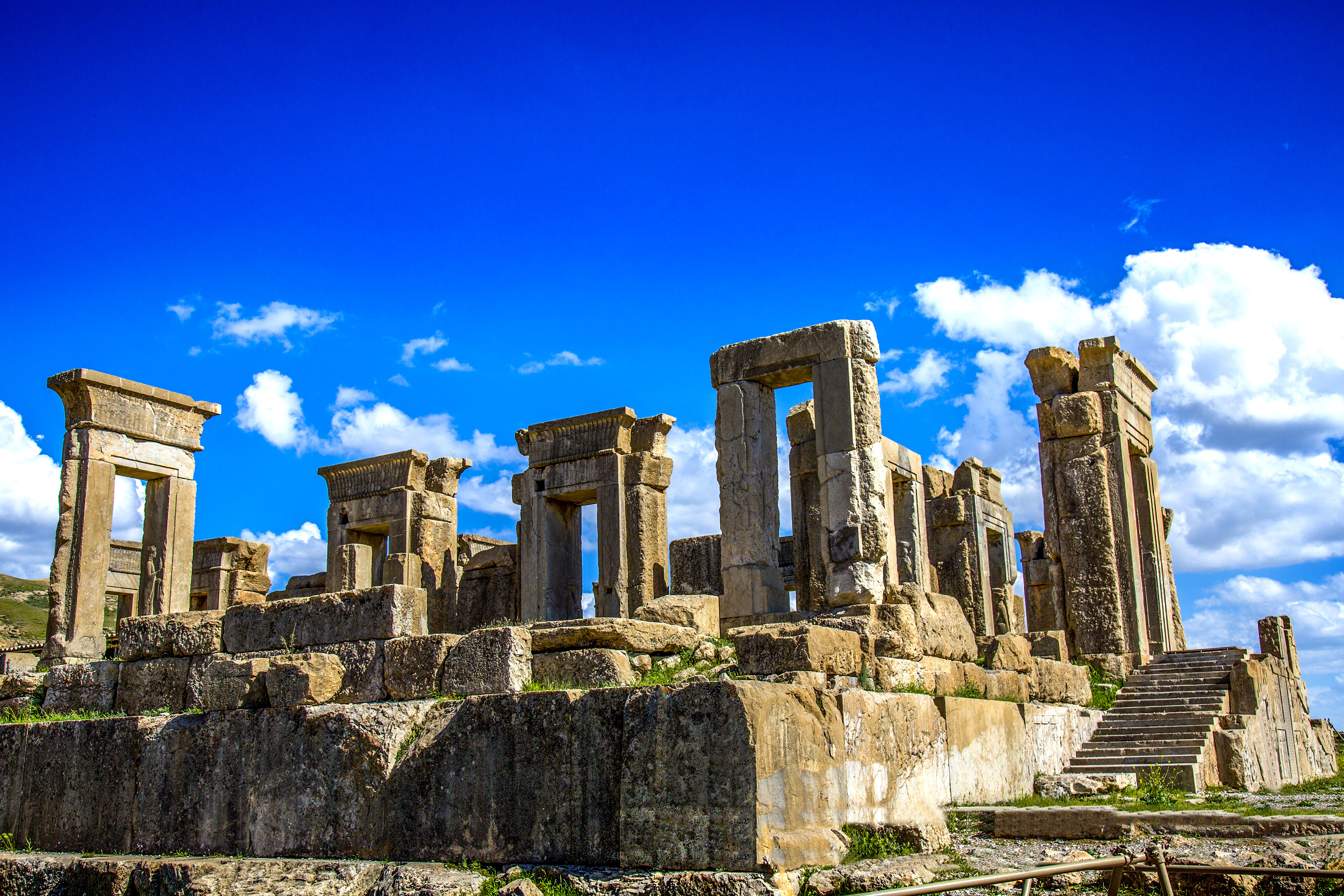
- Persepolis is one of the most important and outstanding works of Iranian architecture in ancient times.
- Genre: Documentary film
- Showrunner: Ismail Mirfakharai (fa)
- Written by: Hamid Soheili (fa)
- Directed by: Hamid Soheili
- Composer: Vanko Naidanov
- Country of origin: Iran
- Original language: Persian
- No. of episodes: 33

Original release
- Network: IRIB TV1
- Release: 1983 – 1992

The Iranian Architecture documentary (Persian: مستند معماری ایرانی) was produced and directed by Hamid Soheili Mozaffar (fa) between 1983 and 1992, following numerous journeys across different regions of Iran. It was created under the Culture, Literature, and Art department of Channel One of the Islamic Republic of Iran Broadcasting (IRIB).

After the initial broadcast of the documentary series, it received widespread acclaim, leading to a re-airing of its early episodes. A televised panel discussion was also held with experts in the field to analyze the impact of the documentary on audiences and explore the characteristics of Iranian architecture.

This documentary is preserved in the central archives of IRIB and was inscribed on Iran’s National Memory of the World Register (fa) in 2018 for nomination to UNESCO's Memory of the World Programme. This UNESCO initiative, established in 1992, aims to raise awareness about the risks facing the world's documentary heritage.

== History ==
This television documentary was broadcast between 1983 and 1992.

Iranian Architecture, as described by Hamid Sohaili:

In the summer of 1983, I began producing the Iranian Architecture documentary series for Channel One. Research and filming were conducted simultaneously. I was the primary researcher, and with the collaboration of several talented young individuals—among them Mehrdad Mir Kiani (makeup artist)—we gathered a significant volume of architectural and urban planning documents at our office, located in Golestan Studio.

The 33-episode series was structured as follows:

10 episodes were dedicated to historical periodization,

5 episodes focused on individual architectural structures,

14 episodes explored historical themes,

4 episodes examined technical aspects of Iranian architecture.

A distinguishing feature of the series was its ability to depict the social conditions and spirit of various historical periods through multiple significant examples. The documentary, with a total runtime of 1,371 minutes, was completed in late summer 1991 after nearly eight years of work and extensive travel across Iran. It premiered on Channel One in mid-October 1991, and its broadcast continued until June 1992.

The narration was provided by Ismail Mirfakharai (fa), and the original soundtrack was composed by Vanko Naidanov. The research team included esteemed experts such as Dr. Mohammad Karim Pirnia, Engineer Baqer Ayatollahzadeh Shirazi, Engineer Mohammad Mehryar, and Engineer Eskandar Mokhtari, along with many other specialists in cultural heritage. One of the fundamental sources for this documentary was Survey of Persian Art by Arthur Upham Pope.

== Episodes ==
This documentary series consists of 33 episodes, categorized into four distinct groups, each focusing on different aspects of Iranian architecture, including technical details, styles, and schools of thought. The main sections of the series are:

- Chronology of Iranian Architecture – covering the evolution of architecture from its origins to the end of the Qajar period.
- Analysis of Key Architectural Structures– examining significant individual buildings.
- Technical Aspects of Iranian Architecture – exploring construction techniques and methodologies.

Additionally, a one-hour panel discussion was produced featuring researchers who analyzed the themes and impact of the documentary after its broadcast. The series also documented many architectural sites that have since disappeared or undergone significant changes.

== Preservation ==
This documentary series is preserved in the central archives of the Islamic Republic of Iran Broadcasting (IRIB) in multiple formats, including negative, positive, and Betacam, all in color. It has also been digitized for long-term preservation. The original version was filmed on 16mm negative film.

== Awards and recognitions ==
The Iranian Architecture documentary has been featured in the following festivals:

- 1992 – Participated in the ABU Festival, Tokyo.
- 1994 – Received a Certificate of Appreciation at the First Cultural Heritage Festival, Tehran.
- 1995 – Awarded an Honorary Diploma at the First National Television Festival, Zibakenar.
- 2006 – Received a Certificate of Recognition at the First Archaeological Documentary Film Festival, Tehran.
