= Anbarsar =

Anbarsar or Anbar Sar (Persian: انبارسر) may refer to:

- Anbar Sar, Gilan
- Anbarsar, Mazandaran
