= Deh-e Mord Sara =

Deh-e Mord Sara ده مردسرا
- Village
- Location within Iran
- Coordinates: 37°19′45″N 49°55′19″E
- Country: Iran
- Province: Gilan
- County: Rasht
- Bakhsh: Lasht-e Nesha
- Rural District: Jirhandeh-ye Lasht-e Nesha

Population (2016)
  - Total: 98
- Time zone: UTC+3:30 (IRST)

Deh-e Mord Sara (Persian: ده مردسرا, also Romanized as Deh-e Mord Sarā; also known as Dah Mard Sarā-ye Māshak, Deh-e Mardomsarā, Deh-e Mordeh Sarā, and Deh-e Mord Sarā-ye Māshak) is a village in Jirhandeh-ye Lasht-e Nesha Rural District, Lasht-e Nesha District, Rasht County, Gilan Province, Iran.

At the time of the 2006 National Census, the village's population was 126 in 34 households. The following census in 2011 counted 95 people in 34 households. The 2016 census measured the population of the village as 98 people in 40 households.
