= Ziba Kenar =

Village in Gilan province, Iran

Ziba Kenar Persian: زيبا کنار
- Village
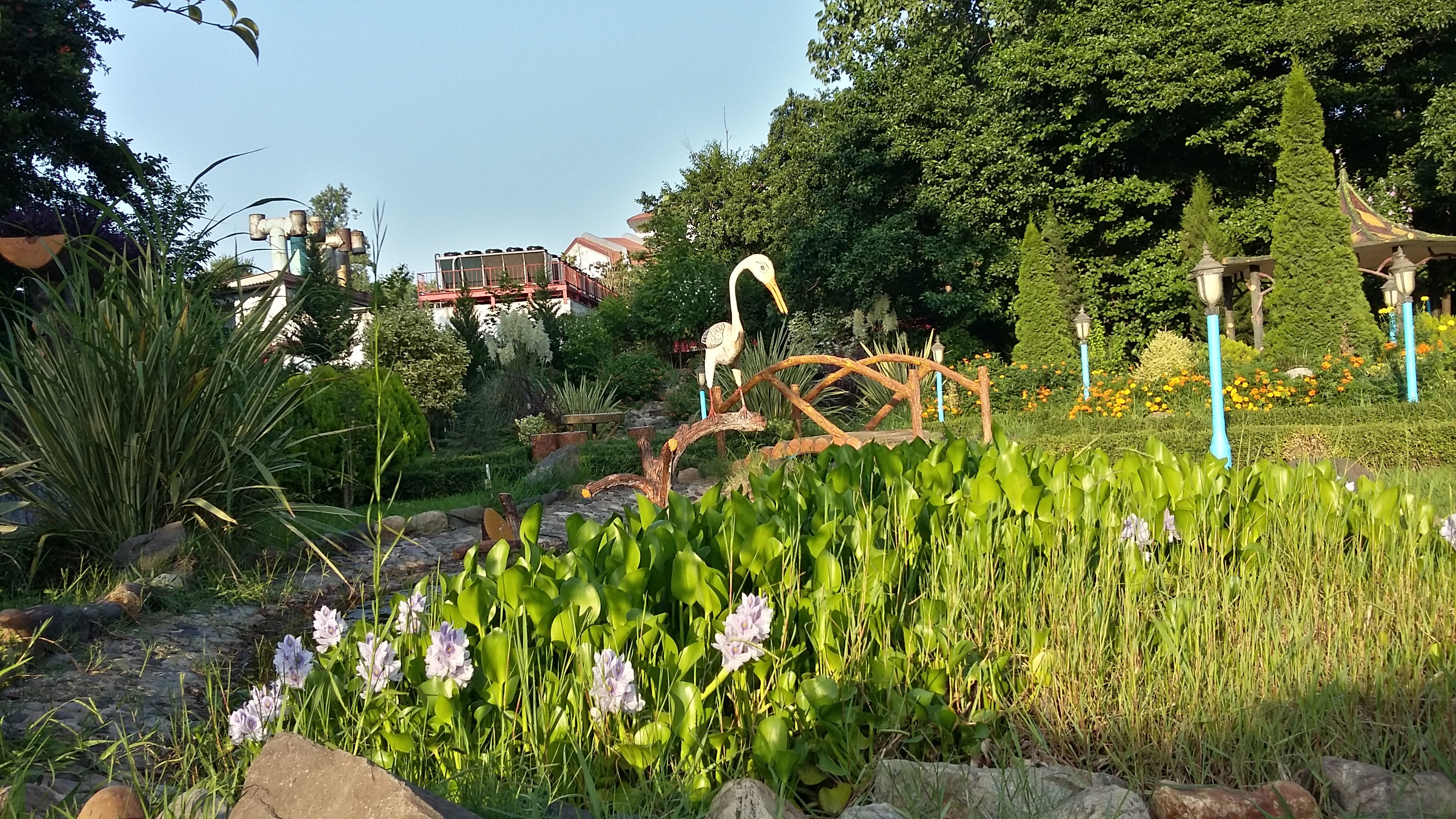
- Gilan landscape

- Location within Iran
- Coordinates: 37°26′03″N 49°52′31″E
- Country: Iran
- Province: Gilan
- County: Rasht
- District: Lasht-e Nesha
- Rural District: Aliabad-e Ziba Kenar

Population (2016)
  - Total: 1,522
- Time zone: UTC+3:30 (IRST)

Ziba Kenar (Persian: زيبا کنار) (Note: Also romanized as Zībā Kenār; formerly known as Aliabad (علي اباد), also romanized as ‘Alīābād; also known as ‘Alīābād Chūnchenān, ‘Alīābād-e Chūnchenān, and Bandar-e ‘Alīābād) is a village in, and the capital of, Aliabad-e Ziba Kenar Rural District in Lasht-e Nesha District of Rasht County, Gilan province, Iran.

== Demographics ==
=== Population ===
At the time of the 2006 National Census, the village's population, as Aliabad, was 2,050 in 604 households. The following census in 2011 counted 2,133 people in 692 households, by which time the village was listed as Ziba Kenar. The 2016 census measured the population of the village as 1,522 people in 530 households. It was the most populous village in its rural district.
