= Nabi Dehga =

Nabi Dehga نبی دهگا
- Village
- Location within Iran
- Coordinates: 37°21′14″N 49°55′38″E
- Country: Iran
- Province: Gilan
- County: Astaneh-ye Ashrafiyeh
- Bakhsh: Kiashahr
- Rural District: Kiashahr

Population (2016)
  - Total: 403
- Time zone: UTC+3:30 (IRST)

Nabi Dehga (Persian: نبی دهگا, also Romanized as Nabī Dehgā; also known as Nabī Dehkā and Navīd Dehkā) meaning "'Village of the Prophet'" is a village in Kiashahr Rural District, Kiashahr District, Astaneh-ye Ashrafiyeh County, Gilan Province, Iran.

At the time of the 2006 National Census, the village's population was 330 in 88 households. The following census in 2011 counted 368 people in 109 households. The 2016 census measured the population of the village as 403 people in 123 households.

== Language ==
The village is ancestrally Gilaki speaking.
