= Salak Deh =

Village in Gilan province, Iran

Salak Deh Persian: سالكده
- Village
- Location within Iran
- Coordinates: 37°23′04″N 50°00′15″E
- Country: Iran
- Province: Gilan
- County: Astaneh-ye Ashrafiyeh
- District: Kiashahr
- Rural District: Kiashahr

Population (2016)
  - Total: 896
- Time zone: UTC+3:30 (IRST)

Salak Deh (Persian: سالكده) (Note: Also romanized as Sālak Deh, Sālek Deh, and Salkadeh) is a village in Kiashahr Rural District of Kiashahr District in Astaneh-ye Ashrafiyeh County, Gilan province, Iran.

== Demographics ==
=== Population ===
At the time of the 2006 National Census, the village's population was 1,058 in 334 households. The following census in 2011 counted 1,002 people in 353 households. The 2016 census measured the population of the village as 896 people in 333 households.
