= Zahandeh =

Village in Gilan province, Iran

Zahandeh Persian: زهنده
- Village
- Location within Iran
- Coordinates: 37°20′37″N 49°53′47″E
- Country: Iran
- Province: Gilan
- County: Rasht
- District: Lasht-e Nesha
- Rural District: Jirhandeh-ye Lasht-e Nesha

Population (2016)
  - Total: 326
- Time zone: UTC+3:30 (IRST)

Zahandeh (Persian: زهنده) is a village in Jirhandeh-ye Lasht-e Nesha Rural District of Lasht-e Nesha District in Rasht County, Gilan province, Iran.

== Demographics ==
=== Population ===
At the time of the 2006 National Census, the village's population was 432 in 120 households. The following census in 2011 counted 364 people in 120 households. The 2016 census measured the population of the village as 326 people in 121 households.
