= Khoshk Rud, Gilan =

Khoshk Rud خشک رود
- Village
- Location within Iran
- Coordinates: 37°21′55″N 49°52′26″E
- Country: Iran
- Province: Gilan
- County: Rasht
- Bakhsh: Lasht-e Nesha
- Rural District: Jirhandeh-ye Lasht-e Nesha

Population (2016)
  - Total: 233
- Time zone: UTC+3:30 (IRST)

Khoshk Rud (Persian: خشک رود, also Romanized as Khoshk Rūd, Khoshkerūd, and Khoshk-e Rūd; also known as Khoshg Rood Lasht Nesha and Khoshkehrūd) is a village in Jirhandeh-ye Lasht-e Nesha Rural District, Lasht-e Nesha District, Rasht County, Gilan Province, Iran.

At the time of the 2006 National Census, the village's population was 339 in 102 households. The following census in 2011 counted 261 people in 94 households. The 2016 census measured the population of the village as 233 people in 85 households.
