= Losku =

Losku لسكو
- Village
- Location within Iran
- Coordinates: 37°19′52″N 49°54′43″E
- Country: Iran
- Province: Gilan
- County: Rasht
- Bakhsh: Lasht-e Nesha
- Rural District: Jirhandeh-ye Lasht-e Nesha

Population (2016)
  - Total: 112
- Time zone: UTC+3:30 (IRST)

Losku (Persian: لسكو, also Romanized as Loskū) is a village in Jirhandeh-ye Lasht-e Nesha Rural District, Lasht-e Nesha District, Rasht County, Gilan Province, Iran.

At the time of the 2006 National Census, the village's population was 153 in 47 households. The following census in 2011 counted 128 people in 46 households. The 2016 census measured the population of the village as 112 people in 49 households.
