= Lasheh, Rasht =

Village in Gilan province, Iran

Lasheh Persian: لاشه
- Village
- Location within Iran
- Coordinates: 37°19′58″N 49°52′53″E
- Country: Iran
- Province: Gilan
- County: Rasht
- District: Lasht-e Nesha
- Rural District: Jirhandeh-ye Lasht-e Nesha

Population (2016)
  - Total: 334
- Time zone: UTC+3:30 (IRST)

Lasheh (Persian: لاشه) (Note: Also romanized as Lāsheh) is a village in Jirhandeh-ye Lasht-e Nesha Rural District of Lasht-e Nesha District in Rasht County, Gilan province, Iran.

== Demographics ==
=== Population ===
At the time of the 2006 National Census, the village's population was 500 in 142 households. The following census in 2011 counted 406 people in 131 households. The 2016 census measured the population of the village as 334 people in 125 households.
