= Tazehabad, Lasht-e Nesha =

Village in Gilan province, Iran

Tazehabad Persian: تازه اباد
- Village
- Location within Iran
- Coordinates: 37°24′17″N 49°50′59″E
- Country: Iran
- Province: Gilan
- County: Rasht
- District: Lasht-e Nesha
- Rural District: Aliabad-e Ziba Kenar

Population (2016)
  - Total: 151
- Time zone: UTC+3:30 (IRST)

Tazehabad (Persian: تازه اباد) (Note: Also romanized as Tāzehābād) is a village in Aliabad-e Ziba Kenar Rural District of Lasht-e Nesha District in Rasht County, Gilan province, Iran.

== Demographics ==
=== Population ===
At the time of the 2006 National Census, the village's population was 204 in 69 households. The following census in 2011 counted 171 people in 62 households. The 2016 census measured the population of the village as 151 people in 58 households.
