= Malekdeh =

Village in Gilan province, Iran

Malekdeh Persian: ملكده
- Village
- Location within Iran
- Coordinates: 37°22′53″N 49°49′07″E
- Country: Iran
- Province: Gilan
- County: Rasht
- District: Lasht-e Nesha
- Rural District: Aliabad-e Ziba Kenar

Population (2016)
  - Total: 122
- Time zone: UTC+3:30 (IRST)

Malekdeh (Persian: ملكده) (Note: Also romanized as Malakdeh and Malek Deh; also known as Balakdeh) is a village in Aliabad-e Ziba Kenar Rural District of Lasht-e Nesha District in Rasht County, Gilan province, Iran.

== Demographics ==
=== Population ===
At the time of the 2006 National Census, the village's population was 187 in 59 households. The following census in 2011 counted 144 people in 53 households. The 2016 census measured the population of the village as 122 people in 44 households.
