= Doshman Kordeh =

Village in Gilan province, Iran

Doshman Kordeh Persian: دشمن كرده
- Village
- Location within Iran
- Coordinates: 37°21′48″N 50°05′19″E
- Country: Iran
- Province: Gilan
- County: Astaneh-ye Ashrafiyeh
- District: Kiashahr
- Rural District: Dehgah

Population (2016)
  - Total: 337
- Time zone: UTC+3:30 (IRST)

Doshman Kordeh (Persian: دشمن كرده) is a village in Dehgah Rural District of Kiashahr District in Astaneh-ye Ashrafiyeh County, Gilan province, Iran.

== Demographics ==
=== Population ===
At the time of the 2006 National Census, the village's population was 378 in 116 households. The following census in 2011 counted 358 people in 122 households. The 2016 census measured the population of the village as 337 people in 130 households.
