= Jirhandeh =

Village in Gilan province, Iran

Jirhandeh Persian: جيرهنده
- Village
- Location within Iran
- Coordinates: 37°20′06″N 49°51′38″E
- Country: Iran
- Province: Gilan
- County: Rasht
- District: Lasht-e Nesha
- Rural District: Jirhandeh-ye Lasht-e Nesha

Population (2016)
  - Total: 571
- Time zone: UTC+3:30 (IRST)

Jirhandeh (Persian: جيرهنده) (Note: Also romanized as Jīrhandeh) is a village in, and the capital of, Jirhandeh-ye Lasht-e Nesha Rural District in Lasht-e Nesha District of Rasht County, Gilan province, Iran.

== Demographics ==
=== Population ===
At the time of the 2006 National Census, the village's population was 605 in 180 households. The following census in 2011 counted 577 people in 195 households. The 2016 census measured the population of the village as 571 people in 201 households.
