= Salim Chaf =

Village in Gilan province, Iran

Salim Chaf Persian: سليم چاف
- Village
- Location within Iran
- Coordinates: 37°23′01″N 50°06′36″E
- Country: Iran
- Province: Gilan
- County: Astaneh-ye Ashrafiyeh
- District: Kiashahr
- Rural District: Dehgah

Population (2016)
  - Total: 345
- Time zone: UTC+3:30 (IRST)

Salim Chaf (Persian: سليم چاف) (Note: Also romanized as Salīm Chāf; also known as Salīm Chāk) is a village in Dehgah Rural District of Kiashahr District in Astaneh-ye Ashrafiyeh County, Gilan province, Iran.

== Demographics ==
=== Population ===
At the time of the 2006 National Census, the village's population was 360 in 109 households. The following census in 2011 counted 344 people in 115 households. The 2016 census measured the population of the village as 345 people in 129 households.
