= Noqreh Deh =

Village in Gilan province, Iran

Noqreh Deh Persian: نقره ده
- Village
- Location within Iran
- Coordinates: 37°22′10″N 49°56′06″E
- Country: Iran
- Province: Gilan
- County: Astaneh-ye Ashrafiyeh
- District: Kiashahr
- Rural District: Kiashahr

Population (2016)
  - Total: 1,162
- Time zone: UTC+3:30 (IRST)

Noqreh Deh (Persian: نقره ده) (Note: Also known as Nakordedi, Noghreh Deh, Noqar Deh, and Nowkhowrdeh) is a village in Kiashahr Rural District of Kiashahr District in Astaneh-ye Ashrafiyeh County, Gilan province, Iran.

== Demographics ==
=== Population ===
At the time of the 2006 National Census, the village's population was 1,046 in 288 households. The following census in 2011 counted 944 people in 308 households. The 2016 census measured the population of the village as 1,162 people in 389 households.
