= Kord Kheyl-e Valam =

Village in Gilan province, Iran

Kord Kheyl-e Valam Persian: كردخيل ولم
- Village
- Location within Iran
- Coordinates: 37°20′32″N 49°53′20″E
- Country: Iran
- Province: Gilan
- County: Rasht
- District: Lasht-e Nesha
- Rural District: Jirhandeh-ye Lasht-e Nesha

Population (2016)
  - Total: 309
- Time zone: UTC+3:30 (IRST)

Kord Kheyl-e Valam (Persian: كردخيل ولم) (Note: Also romanized as Kord Khil-e Valam and Kord Khīl-e Valam; also known as Kord Khīl) is a village in Jirhandeh-ye Lasht-e Nesha Rural District of Lasht-e Nesha District in Rasht County, Gilan province, Iran.

== Demographics ==
=== Population ===
At the time of the 2006 National Census, the village's population was 397 in 113 households. The following census in 2011 counted 320 people in 109 households. The 2016 census measured the population of the village as 309 people in 119 households.
