= Shahmir Sara =

Village in Gilan province, Iran

Shahmir Sara Persian: شهميرسرا
- Village
- Location within Iran
- Coordinates: 37°25′02″N 49°49′45″E
- Country: Iran
- Province: Gilan
- County: Rasht
- District: Lasht-e Nesha
- Rural District: Aliabad-e Ziba Kenar

Population (2016)
  - Total: 201
- Time zone: UTC+3:30 (IRST)

Shahmir Sara (Persian: شهميرسرا) (Note: Also romanized as Shahmīr Sarā) is a village in Aliabad-e Ziba Kenar Rural District of Lasht-e Nesha District in Rasht County, Gilan province, Iran.

== Demographics ==
=== Population ===
At the time of the 2006 National Census, the village's population was 228 in 74 households. The following census in 2011 counted 213 people in 76 households. The 2016 census measured the population of the village as 201 people in 75 households.
