= Nowrud =

Village in Gilan province, Iran

Nowrud Persian: نورود
- Village
- Location within Iran
- Coordinates: 37°19′24″N 49°52′11″E
- Country: Iran
- Province: Gilan
- County: Rasht
- District: Lasht-e Nesha
- Rural District: Jirhandeh-ye Lasht-e Nesha

Population (2016)
  - Total: 628
- Time zone: UTC+3:30 (IRST)

Nowrud (Persian: نورود) (Note: Also romanized as Nowrūd) is a village in Jirhandeh-ye Lasht-e Nesha Rural District of Lasht-e Nesha District in Rasht County, Gilan province, Iran.

== Demographics ==
=== Population ===
At the time of the 2006 National Census, the village's population was 722 in 224 households. The following census in 2011 counted 693 people in 234 households. The 2016 census measured the population of the village as 628 people in 234 households.
