= Chalkesh =

Chalkesh چالكش
- Village
- Location within Iran
- Coordinates: 37°24′28″N 49°52′54″E
- Country: Iran
- Province: Gilan
- County: Rasht
- Bakhsh: Lasht-e Nesha
- Rural District: Jirhandeh-ye Lasht-e Nesha

Population (2011)
  - Total: 47
- Time zone: UTC+3:30 (IRST)

Chalkesh (Persian: چالكش, also romanized as Chālkesh and Chālkosh; also known as Chālkesh-e Fakhrābād) is a village in Jirhandeh-ye Lasht-e Nesha Rural District, Lasht-e Nesha District, Rasht County, Gilan Province, Iran.

At the time of the 2006 National Census, the village's population was 18 in 5 households. The following census in 2011 counted 47 people in 15 households. The 2016 census measured the population of the village as 0.
