= Bala Mahalleh-ye Gildeh =

Village in Gilan province, Iran

Bala Mahalleh-ye Gildeh Persian: بالامحله گيلده
- Village
- Location within Iran
- Coordinates: 37°20′56″N 50°05′57″E
- Country: Iran
- Province: Gilan
- County: Astaneh-ye Ashrafiyeh
- District: Kiashahr
- Rural District: Dehgah

Population (2016)
  - Total: 364
- Time zone: UTC+3:30 (IRST)

Bala Mahalleh-ye Gildeh (Persian: بالامحله گيلده) (Note: Also romanized as Bālā Maḩalleh-ye Gīldeh; also known as Gīldeh) is a village in Dehgah Rural District of Kiashahr District in Astaneh-ye Ashrafiyeh County, Gilan province, Iran.

== Demographics ==
=== Population ===
At the time of the 2006 National Census, the village's population was 425 in 141 households. The following census in 2011 counted 415 people in 153 households. The 2016 census measured the population of the village as 364 people in 142 households.
