= Chunchenan =

Village in Gilan province, Iran

Chunchenan Persian: چونچنان
- Village
- Location within Iran
- Coordinates: 37°26′00″N 49°51′10″E
- Country: Iran
- Province: Gilan
- County: Rasht
- District: Lasht-e Nesha
- Rural District: Aliabad-e Ziba Kenar

Population (2016)
  - Total: 774
- Time zone: UTC+3:30 (IRST)

Chunchenan (Persian: چونچنان) (Note: Also romanized as Chūnchenān and Chūnechenān; also known as Bandar-e Chūnchenān, Chunchunīān, Chūnehchenān, Chyunchunchian, and Sheylāt-e Chūnechenān) is a village in Aliabad-e Ziba Kenar Rural District of Lasht-e Nesha District in Rasht County, Gilan province, Iran.

== Demographics ==
=== Population ===
At the time of the 2006 National Census, the village's population was 1,146 in 338 households. The following census in 2011 counted 1,026 people in 329 households. The 2016 census measured the population of the village as 774 people in 273 households.
