= Seyqaldeh =

Seyqaldeh or Seyqal Deh (Persian: صيقلده) may refer to:

- Seyqaldeh, Astaneh-ye Ashrafiyeh
- Seyqaldeh, Rudbar
