= Pain Rudposht =

Village in Gilan province, Iran

Pain Rudposht Persian: پائين رودپشت
- Village
- Location within Iran
- Coordinates: 37°21′01″N 50°09′12″E
- Country: Iran
- Province: Gilan
- County: Astaneh-ye Ashrafiyeh
- District: Kiashahr
- Rural District: Dehgah

Population (2016)
  - Total: 929
- Time zone: UTC+3:30 (IRST)

Pain Rudposht (Persian: پائين رودپشت) (Note: Also romanized as Pā’īn Rūd Posht and Pā’īn Rūdposht; also known as Pā’īn Rūd Posht-e Pā’īn Maḩalleh) is a village in Dehgah Rural District of Kiashahr District in Astaneh-ye Ashrafiyeh County, Gilan province, Iran.

== Demographics ==
=== Population ===
At the time of the 2006 National Census, the village's population was 1,109 in 368 households. The following census in 2011 counted 973 people in 376 households. The 2016 census measured the population of the village as 929 people in 362 households.
