= Juryab =

Village in Gilan province, Iran

Juryab Persian: لجورياب
- Village
- Location within Iran
- Coordinates: 37°18′46″N 49°50′45″E
- Country: Iran
- Province: Gilan
- County: Rasht
- District: Lasht-e Nesha
- Rural District: Gafsheh-ye Lasht-e Nesha

Population (2016)
  - Total: 565
- Time zone: UTC+3:30 (IRST)

Juryab (Persian: جورياب) (Note: Also romanized as Joor Yab, Jowryāb and Jūryāb; also known as Dzhoryab, Joriāb, and Jowryāf) is a village in Gafsheh-ye Lasht-e Nesha Rural District of Lasht-e Nesha District in Rasht County, Gilan province, Iran.

== Demographics ==
=== Population ===
At the time of the 2006 National Census, the village's population was 754 in 273 households. The following census in 2011 counted 676 people in 238 households. The 2016 census measured the population of the village as 565 people in 209 households.
