= Licha, Iran =

Village in Gilan province, Iran

Licha Persian: ليچا
- Village
- Location within Iran
- Coordinates: 37°22′09″N 49°53′47″E
- Country: Iran
- Province: Gilan
- County: Rasht
- District: Lasht-e Nesha
- Rural District: Jirhandeh-ye Lasht-e Nesha

Population (2016)
  - Total: 1,648
- Time zone: UTC+3:30 (IRST)

Licha (Persian: ليچا) (Note: Also romanized as Līchā; formerly known as Lichah (ليچاه), also romanized as Līchāh) is a village in Jirhandeh-ye Lasht-e Nesha Rural District of Lasht-e Nesha District in Rasht County, Gilan province, Iran.

== Demographics ==
=== Population ===
At the time of the 2006 National Census, the village's population, as Lichah, was 1,623 in 498 households. The following census in 2011 counted 1,627 people in 557 households, by which time the village was listed as Licha. The 2016 census measured the population of the village as 1,648 people in 578 households. It was the most populous village in its rural district.
