= Chalikdan =

Chelikdan چليكدان
- Village
- Location within Iran
- Coordinates: 37°17′16″N 49°48′55″E
- Country: Iran
- Province: Gilan
- County: Rasht
- Bakhsh: Lasht-e Nesha
- Rural District: Gafsheh-ye Lasht-e Nesha

Population (2016)
  - Total: 319
- Time zone: UTC+3:30 (IRST)

Chelikdan (Persian: چليكدان, also Romanized as Chalīkdān; also known as Chalakdān) is a village in Gafsheh-ye Lasht-e Nesha Rural District, Lasht-e Nesha District, Rasht County, Gilan Province, Iran.

At the time of the 2006 National Census, the village's population was 380 in 119 households. The following census in 2011 counted 304 people in 112 households. The 2016 census measured the population of the village as 319 people in 107 households.
