= Kenar Sar-e Arbabi =

Kenar Sar-e Arbabi کنارسر اربابی
- Village
- Location within Iran
- Coordinates: 37°19′16″N 49°47′31″E
- Country: Iran
- Province: Gilan
- County: Rasht
- Bakhsh: Lasht-e Nesha
- Rural District: Gafsheh-ye Lasht-e Nesha

Population (2016)
  - Total: 149
- Time zone: UTC+3:30 (IRST)

Kenar Sar-e Arbabi (Persian: کنارسر اربابی, also Romanized as Kenār Sar-e Ārbābī and Kanārsar-e Ārbābī) is a village in Gafsheh-ye Lasht-e Nesha Rural District, Lasht-e Nesha District, Rasht County, Gilan Province, Iran.

At the time of the 2006 National Census, the village's population was 204 in 68 households. The following census in 2011 counted 164 people in 56 households. The 2016 census measured the population of the village as 149 people in 58 households.
