= Nowhadan =

Village in Gilan province, Iran

Nowhadan Persian: نوحدان
- Village
- Location within Iran
- Coordinates: 37°19′53″N 49°51′05″E
- Country: Iran
- Province: Gilan
- County: Rasht
- District: Lasht-e Nesha
- Rural District: Jirhandeh-ye Lasht-e Nesha

Population (2016)
  - Total: 353
- Time zone: UTC+3:30 (IRST)

Nowhadan (Persian: نوحدان) (Note: Also romanized as Noohdan and Nowḩadān; also known as Nodan and Nowdān) is a village in Jirhandeh-ye Lasht-e Nesha Rural District of Lasht-e Nesha District in Rasht County, Gilan province, Iran.

== Demographics ==
=== Population ===
At the time of the 2006 National Census, the village's population was 392 in 121 households. The following census in 2011 counted 334 people in 114 households. The 2016 census measured the population of the village as 353 people in 130 households.
