= Balakdeh =

Balakdeh بلكده
- Village
- Location within Iran
- Coordinates: 37°23′06″N 49°49′59″E
- Country: Iran
- Province: Gilan
- County: Rasht
- Bakhsh: Lasht-e Nesha
- Rural District: Jirhandeh-ye Lasht-e Nesha

Population (2016)
  - Total: 117
- Time zone: UTC+3:30 (IRST)

Balakdeh (Persian: بلكده) is a village in Jirhandeh-ye Lasht-e Nesha Rural District, Lasht-e Nesha District, Rasht County, Gilan Province, Iran.

At the time of the 2006 National Census, the village's population was 189 in 53 households. The following census in 2011 counted 122 people in 39 households. The 2016 census measured the population of the village as 117 people in 44 households.
