= Dovaj =

Village in Gilan province, Iran

Dovaj Persian: دواج
- Village
- Location within Iran
- Coordinates: 37°23′08″N 49°48′41″E
- Country: Iran
- Province: Gilan
- County: Rasht
- District: Lasht-e Nesha
- Rural District: Aliabad-e Ziba Kenar

Population (2016)
  - Total: 175
- Time zone: UTC+3:30 (IRST)

Dovaj (Persian: دواج) is a village in Aliabad-e Ziba Kenar Rural District of Lasht-e Nesha District in Rasht County, Gilan province, Iran.

== Demographics ==
=== Population ===
At the time of the 2006 National Census, the village's population was 119 in 36 households. The following census in 2011 counted 203 people in 70 households. The 2016 census measured the population of the village as 175 people in 61 households.

After the census, the village of Dubaj merged with Dovaj.
