= Laleh Gafsheh =

Village in Gilan province, Iran

Laleh Gafsheh Persian: لاله گفشه
- Village
- Location within Iran
- Coordinates: 37°20′09″N 49°49′33″E
- Country: Iran
- Province: Gilan
- County: Rasht
- District: Lasht-e Nesha
- Rural District: Gafsheh-ye Lasht-e Nesha

Population (2016)
  - Total: 417
- Time zone: UTC+3:30 (IRST)

Laleh Gafsheh (Persian: لاله گفشه) (Note: Also romanized as Lāleh Gafsheh; also known as Lāleh Maḩalleh-ye Gafsheh) is a village in Gafsheh-ye Lasht-e Nesha Rural District of Lasht-e Nesha District in Rasht County, Gilan province, Iran.

== Demographics ==
=== Population ===
At the time of the 2006 National Census, the village's population was 424 in 140 households. The following census in 2011 counted 443 people in 143 households. The 2016 census measured the population of the village as 417 people in 153 households.
