= Zarem Kalayeh =

Zarem Kalayeh زارم كلايه
- Village
- Location within Iran
- Coordinates: 37°22′40″N 49°59′41″E
- Country: Iran
- Province: Gilan
- County: Astaneh-ye Ashrafiyeh
- Bakhsh: Kiashahr
- Rural District: Kiashahr

Population (2016)
  - Total: 101
- Time zone: UTC+3:30 (IRST)

Zarem Kalayeh (Persian: زارم كلايه, also Romanized as Zārem Kalāyeh) is a village in Kiashahr Rural District, Kiashahr District, Astaneh-ye Ashrafiyeh County, Gilan Province, Iran.

At the time of the 2006 National Census, the village's population was 99 in 31 households. The following census in 2011 counted 174 people in 61 households. The 2016 census measured the population of the village as 101 people in 36 households.
