= Azhdeha Baluch =

Village in Gilan province, Iran

Azhdeha Baluch Persian: اژدهابلوچ
- Village
- Location within Iran
- Coordinates: 37°24′36″N 49°50′34″E
- Country: Iran
- Province: Gilan
- County: Rasht
- District: Lasht-e Nesha
- Rural District: Aliabad-e Ziba Kenar

Population (2016)
  - Total: 176
- Time zone: UTC+3:30 (IRST)

Azhdeha Baluch (Persian: اژدهابلوچ) (Note: Also romanized as Azhdehā Balūch) is a village in Aliabad-e Ziba Kenar Rural District of Lasht-e Nesha District in Rasht County, Gilan province, Iran.

== Demographics ==
=== Population ===
At the time of the 2006 National Census, the village's population was 256 in 83 households. The following census in 2011 counted 196 people in 76 households. The 2016 census measured the population of the village as 176 people in 75 households.
