= Jelidan =

Village in Gilan province, Iran

Jelidan Persian: جليدان
- Village
- Location within Iran
- Coordinates: 37°23′19″N 49°50′36″E
- Country: Iran
- Province: Gilan
- County: Rasht
- District: Lasht-e Nesha
- Rural District: Aliabad-e Ziba Kenar

Population (2016)
  - Total: 981
- Time zone: UTC+3:30 (IRST)

Jelidan (Persian: جليدان) (Note: Also romanized as Dzhelidan and Jelīdān; also known as Jīldān) is a village in Aliabad-e Ziba Kenar Rural District of Lasht-e Nesha District in Rasht County, Gilan province, Iran.

== Demographics ==
=== Population ===
At the time of the 2006 National Census, the village's population was 1,181 in 345 households. The following census in 2011 counted 1,135 people in 383 households. The 2016 census measured the population of the village as 981 people in 357 households.
