= Lakuzhdeh =

Village in Gilan province, Iran

Lakuzhdeh Persian: لاكوژده
- Village
- Location within Iran
- Coordinates: 37°23′28″N 49°56′52″E
- Country: Iran
- Province: Gilan
- County: Astaneh-ye Ashrafiyeh
- District: Kiashahr
- Rural District: Kiashahr

Population (2016)
  - Total: 574
- Time zone: UTC+3:30 (IRST)

Lakuzhdeh (Persian: لاكوژده) (Note: Also romanized as Lākūzhdeh; also known as Kūzhdeh) is a village in Kiashahr Rural District of Kiashahr District in Astaneh-ye Ashrafiyeh County, Gilan province, Iran.

== Demographics ==
=== Population ===
At the time of the 2006 National Census, the village's population was 533 in 152 households. The following census in 2011 counted 584 people in 186 households. The 2016 census measured the population of the village as 574 people in 203 households.
