= Chafu Chah =

Chafu Chah چافوچاه
- Village
- Location within Iran
- Coordinates: 37°19′08″N 49°51′57″E
- Country: Iran
- Province: Gilan
- County: Rasht
- Bakhsh: Lasht-e Nesha
- Rural District: Gafsheh-ye Lasht-e Nesha

Population (2016)
  - Total: 362
- Time zone: UTC+3:30 (IRST)

Chafu Chah (Persian: چافوچاه, also Romanized as Chāfū Chāh) is a village in Gafsheh-ye Lasht-e Nesha Rural District, Lasht-e Nesha District, Rasht County, Gilan Province, Iran.

At the time of the 2006 National Census, the village's population was 465 in 138 households. The following census in 2011 counted 413 people in 140 households. The 2016 census measured the population of the village as 362 people in 138 households.
