= Chapak-e Shafi Mahalleh =

Chapak-e Shafi Mahalleh چپک شفیع محله
- Village
- Location within Iran
- Coordinates: 37°22′09″N 49°49′02″E
- Country: Iran
- Province: Gilan
- County: Rasht
- Bakhsh: Lasht-e Nesha
- Rural District: Gafsheh-ye Lasht-e Nesha

Population (2016)
  - Total: 190
- Time zone: UTC+3:30 (IRST)

Chapak-e Shafi Mahalleh (Persian: چپک شفیع محله, also Romanized as Chapak-e Shafī‘ Maḩalleh and Chepak-e Shafī‘ Maḩalleh) is a village in Gafsheh-ye Lasht-e Nesha Rural District, Lasht-e Nesha District, Rasht County, Gilan Province, Iran.

At the time of the 2006 National Census, the village's population was 271 in 94 households. The following census in 2011 counted 198 people in 78 households. The 2016 census measured the population of the village as 190 people in 70 households.
