= Jirhandeh-ye Lasht-e Nesha Rural District =

Rural district in Gilan province, Iran

Jirhandeh-ye Lasht-e Nesha Rural District Persian: دهستان جیرهنده لشت نشا
- Rural District
- Location within Iran
- Coordinates: 37°21′N 49°53′E
- Country: Iran
- Province: Gilan
- County: Rasht
- District: Lasht-e Nesha
- Established: 1987
- Capital: Jirhandeh

Population (2016)
  - Total: 5,792
- Time zone: UTC+3:30 (IRST)

Jirhandeh-ye Lasht-e Nesha Rural District (Persian: دهستان جیرهنده لشت نشا) is in Lasht-e Nesha District of Rasht County, Gilan province, Iran. Its capital is the village of Jirhandeh.

== Demographics ==
=== Population ===
At the time of the 2006 National Census, the rural district's population was 6,652 in 1,963 households. There were 6,023 inhabitants in 2,034 households at the following census of 2011. The 2016 census measured the population of the rural district as 5,792 in 2,113 households. The most populous of its 16 villages was Licha, with 1,648 people.

=== Other villages in the rural district ===
- Balakdeh
- Chalkesh
- Deh-e Mord Sara
- Dehsar
- Khoshk Rud
- Kord Khil-e Valam
- Lasheh
- Losku
- Nowhadan
- Nowrud
- Pichah
- Salestan
- Tuchah-e Alman
- Zahandeh
