= Deh Sar, Astaneh-ye Ashrafiyeh =

Village in Gilan province, Iran

Deh Sar Persian: دهسر
- Village
- Location within Iran
- Coordinates: 37°20′53″N 49°56′38″E
- Country: Iran
- Province: Gilan
- County: Astaneh-ye Ashrafiyeh
- District: Kiashahr
- Rural District: Kiashahr

Population (2016)
  - Total: 580
- Time zone: UTC+3:30 (IRST)

Deh Sar (Persian: دهسر) is a village in, and the capital of, Kiashahr Rural District in Kiashahr District of Astaneh-ye Ashrafiyeh County, Gilan province, in Iran.

== Demographics ==
=== Population ===
At the time of the 2006 National Census, the village's population was 541 in 157 households. At the following census in 2011 the population was unchanged at 541 people in 188 households. The 2016 census measured the population of the village as 580 people in 204 households.
