= Mohsenabad-e Pain =

Village in Gilan province, Iran

Mohsenabad-e Pain Persian: محسن ابادپائين
- Village
- Location within Iran
- Coordinates: 37°23′23″N 49°54′51″E
- Country: Iran
- Province: Gilan
- County: Astaneh-ye Ashrafiyeh
- District: Kiashahr
- Rural District: Kiashahr

Population (2016)
  - Total: 598
- Time zone: UTC+3:30 (IRST)

Mohsenabad-e Pain (Persian: محسن ابادپائين) (Note: Also romanized as Moḩsenābād-e Pā’īn; also known as Moḩsenābād) is a village in Kiashahr Rural District of Kiashahr District in Astaneh-ye Ashrafiyeh County, Gilan province, Iran.

== Demographics ==
=== Population ===
At the time of the 2006 National Census, the village's population was 545 in 154 households. The following census in 2011 counted 496 people in 160 households. The 2016 census measured the population of the village as 598 people in 210 households.
