= Dehgah Rural District =

Rural district in Gilan province, Iran

Dehgah Rural District Persian: دهستان دهگاه
- Rural District
- Location within Iran
- Coordinates: 37°22′N 50°07′E
- Country: Iran
- Province: Gilan
- County: Astaneh-ye Ashrafiyeh
- District: Kiashahr
- Established: 1987
- Capital: Dehgah

Population (2016)
  - Total: 9,548
- Time zone: UTC+3:30 (IRST)

Dehgah Rural District (Persian: دهستان دهگاه) is in Kiashahr District of Astaneh-ye Ashrafiyeh County, Gilan province, Iran. Its capital is the village of Dehgah.

== Demographics ==
=== Population ===
At the time of the 2006 National Census, the rural district's population was 10,832 people in 3,358 households. There were 9,805 inhabitants in 3,457 households at the following census of 2011. The 2016 census measured the population of the rural district as 9,548 in 3,537 households. The most populous of its 15 villages was Dastak, with 2,122 people.

=== Other villages in the rural district ===
- Anbar Sar
- Bala Mahalleh-ye Gildeh
- Dahaneh-ye Sar-e Sefidrud-e Kohneh
- Doshman Kordeh
- Laleh Vajeh Sar
- Lukh
- Mohsenabad
- Pain Mahalleh-ye Gildeh
- Pain Rudposht
- Salim Chaf
- Seyqaldeh
