= Bala Mahalleh-ye Gafsheh =

Village in Gilan province, Iran

Bala Mahalleh-ye Gafsheh Persian: بالا محله گفشه
- Village
- Location within Iran
- Coordinates: 37°20′14″N 49°49′11″E
- Country: Iran
- Province: Gilan
- County: Rasht
- District: Lasht-e Nesha
- Rural District: Gafsheh-ye Lasht-e Nesha

Population (2016)
  - Total: 1,533
- Time zone: UTC+3:30 (IRST)

Bala Mahalleh-ye Gafsheh (Persian: بالامحله گفشه) (Note: Also romanized as Bālā Maḩalleh-ye Gafsheh; also known as Bālā Gafsheh) is a village in, and the capital of, Gafsheh-ye Lasht-e Nesha Rural District in Lasht-e Nesha District of Rasht County, Gilan province, Iran.

== Demographics ==
=== Population ===
At the time of the 2006 National Census, the village's population was 1,771 in 500 households. The following census in 2011 counted 1,558 people in 536 households. The 2016 census measured the population of the village as 1,533 people in 508 households. It was the most populous village in its rural district.
