= Mohammad Ali Ramazani Dastak =

Iranian politician (1963–2020)

Member-elect of the Parliament of Iran
- In office Died before taking office
- Preceded by: Mohammad-Hossein Ghorbani
- Succeeded by: Ebrahim Najafi
- Constituency: Astaneh-ye Ashrafiyeh
- Majority: 13,948 (36.08%)

Personal details
- Born: 23 April 1963 Dastak, Astaneh-ye Ashrafiyeh County, Imperial State of Iran
- Died: 29 February 2020 (aged 56) Rasht, Iran
- Party: Front of Islamic Revolution Stability
- Other political affiliations: Electoral lists: SHANA (2020); Islamic Republican Party; Mojahedin of the Islamic Revolution Organization; Fajr-e Islam Group
- Children: 5
- Education: History
- Alma mater: University of Tehran; Institute for Humanities and Cultural Studies
- Website: Official website

Military service
- Allegiance: Iran
- Branch/service: Revolutionary Guards
- Years of service: 1980–2007
- Rank: Colonel
- Battles/wars: Iran–Iraq War (WIA)

Mohammad Ali Ramazani Dastak (Persian: محمدعلی رمضانی دستک; 23 April 1963 – 29 February 2020) was an Iranian politician who was elected to the Iranian Parliament in the 2020 election.

== Biography ==
He also fought in the Iran–Iraq War. He died on 29 February 2020. The cause of his death is disputed. The Iranian health ministry say it was due to influenza although other sources, including the BBC, have reported that he died from COVID-19.
