= Chapak-e Nazemi Mahalleh =

Chapak-e Nazemi Mahalleh چپک ناظمی محله
- Village
- Location within Iran
- Coordinates: 37°22′26″N 49°49′58″E
- Country: Iran
- Province: Gilan
- County: Rasht
- Bakhsh: Lasht-e Nesha
- Rural District: Gafsheh-ye Lasht-e Nesha

Population (2016)
  - Total: 326
- Time zone: UTC+3:30 (IRST)

Chapak-e Nazemi Mahalleh (Persian: چپک ناظمی محله, also Romanized as Chapak-e Nāz̧emī Maḩalleh; also known as Chabak, Chapak, Chapak-e Nāz̧emī, Chapak-e Vāz̧emī, and Chubuk) is a village in Gafsheh-ye Lasht-e Nesha Rural District, Lasht-e Nesha District, Rasht County, Gilan Province, Iran.

At the time of the 2006 National Census, the village's population was 417 in 139 households. The following census in 2011 counted 333 people in 117 households. The 2016 census measured the population of the village as 326 people in 121 households.
