= Dehsar, Rasht =

Dehsar ده سر
- Village
- Location within Iran
- Coordinates: 37°20′38″N 49°51′18″E
- Country: Iran
- Province: Gilan
- County: Rasht
- Bakhsh: Lasht-e Nesha
- Rural District: Jirhandeh-ye Lasht-e Nesha

Government
  - Village head: Mostafa basiri

Population (2016)
  - Total: 299
- Time zone: UTC+3:30 (IRST)

Dehsar (Persian: ده سر) is a village in Jirhandeh-ye Lasht-e Nesha Rural District, Lasht-e Nesha District, Rasht County, Gilan Province, Iran.

At the time of the 2006 National Census, the village's population was 249 in 69 households. The following census in 2011 counted 296 people in 95 households. The 2016 census measured the population of the village as 299 people in 106 households.
