= Eshman-e Dehgah =

Eshman-e Dehgah اشمان دهگاه
- Village
- Location within Iran
- Coordinates: 37°21′54″N 49°59′46″E
- Country: Iran
- Province: Gilan
- County: Astaneh-ye Ashrafiyeh
- Bakhsh: Kiashahr
- Rural District: Kiashahr

Population (2016)
  - Total: 309
- Time zone: UTC+3:30 (IRST)

Eshman-e Dehgah (Persian: اشمان دهگاه, also Romanized as Eshmān-e Dehgāh and Eshmān Dehgāh; also known as Eshkūmdakeh, Eshkūm Dakeh, and Eshkūm Dehkā) is a village in Kiashahr Rural District, Kiashahr District, Astaneh-ye Ashrafiyeh County, Gilan Province, Iran.

At the time of the 2006 National Census, the village's population was 461 in 135 households. The following census in 2011 counted 386 people in 131 households. The 2016 census measured the population of the village as 309 people in 109 households.
