= Anbar Sar, Gilan =

Village in Gilan province, Iran

Anbar Sar Persian: انبارسر
- Village
- Location within Iran
- Coordinates: 37°23′21″N 50°05′22″E
- Country: Iran
- Province: Gilan
- County: Astaneh-ye Ashrafiyeh
- District: Kiashahr
- Rural District: Dehgah

Population (2016)
  - Total: 826
- Time zone: UTC+3:30 (IRST)

Anbar Sar (Persian: انبارسر) (Note: Also romanized as Anbār Sar; also known as Sar Anbār) is a village in Dehgah Rural District of Kiashahr District in Astaneh-ye Ashrafiyeh County, Gilan province, Iran.

== Demographics ==
=== Population ===
At the time of the 2006 National Census, the village's population was 983 in 291 households. The following census in 2011 counted 825 people in 286 households. The 2016 census measured the population of the village as 826 people in 291 households.
