= Lab-e Darya-ye Lasku Kalayeh =

Village in Gilan province, Iran

Lab-e Darya-ye Lasku Kalayeh Persian: لب دريالسكوكلايه
- Village
- Location within Iran
- Coordinates: 37°24′07″N 50°01′59″E
- Country: Iran
- Province: Gilan
- County: Astaneh-ye Ashrafiyeh
- District: Kiashahr
- Rural District: Kiashahr

Population (2016)
  - Total: 633
- Time zone: UTC+3:30 (IRST)

Lab-e Darya-ye Lasku Kalayeh (Persian: لب دريالسكوكلايه) (Note: Also romanized as Lab-e Daryā-ye Laskū Kalayeh; also known as Laskooh, Laskū Kalāyeh, Laskū Kalāyeh-ye Lab-e Daryā, Leskū Kalāyeh, Lesku Kelāyeh, and Leskū Kelāyeh-e Lab-e Daryā) is a village in Kiashahr Rural District of Kiashahr District in Astaneh-ye Ashrafiyeh County, Gilan province, Iran.

== Demographics ==
=== Population ===
At the time of the 2006 National Census, the village's population was 791 in 247 households. The following census in 2011 counted 764 people in 266 households. The 2016 census measured the population of the village as 633 people in 240 households.
