= Eshman-e Kamachal =

Eshman-e Kamachal اشمان كماچال
- Village
- Location within Iran
- Coordinates: 37°21′18″N 49°58′08″E
- Country: Iran
- Province: Gilan
- County: Astaneh-ye Ashrafiyeh
- Bakhsh: Kiashahr
- Rural District: Kiashahr

Population (2016)
  - Total: 304
- Time zone: UTC+3:30 (IRST)

Eshman-e Kamachal (Persian: اشمان كماچال, also Romanized as Eshmān-e Kamāchāl, Ashmān Kāmchāl, and Eshmān Komāchāl; also known as Akhshām Chāl, Ashkāmchāl, Ashkām Chāl, Ashkemchal’, Eshkām-Chāl, and Komāchāl) is a village in Kiashahr Rural District, Kiashahr District, Astaneh-ye Ashrafiyeh County, Gilan Province, Iran.

At the time of the 2006 National Census, the village's population was 373 in 118 households. The following census in 2011 counted 347 people in 141 households. The 2016 census measured the population of the village as 304 people in 125 households.
