= Dahaneh-ye Sar-e Sefidrud-e Kohneh =

Village in Gilan province, Iran

Dahaneh-ye Sar-e Sefidrud-e Kohneh Persian: دهنه سرسپيدرودكهنه
- Village
- Location within Iran
- Coordinates: 37°22′54″N 50°10′17″E
- Country: Iran
- Province: Gilan
- County: Astaneh-ye Ashrafiyeh
- District: Kiashahr
- Rural District: Dehgah

Population (2016)
  - Total: 544
- Time zone: UTC+3:30 (IRST)

Dahaneh-ye Sar-e Sefidrud-e Kohneh (Persian: دهنه سرسپيدرودكهنه) (Note: Also romanized as Dahaneh-ye Sar-e Sefīdrūd-e Kohneh; also known as Dahaneh Sar (دهنه سر) and Dahaneh-ye Sar-e Sefīdrūd (دهنه سرسپيدرود)) is a village in Dehgah Rural District of Kiashahr District in Astaneh-ye Ashrafiyeh County, Gilan province, Iran.

== Demographics ==
=== Population ===
At the time of the 2006 National Census, the village's population was 638 in 179 households. The following census in 2011 counted 539 people in 192 households. The 2016 census measured the population of the village as 544 people in 194 households.
