= Lukh, Gilan =

Village in Gilan province, Iran

Lukh Persian: لوخ
- Village
- Location within Iran
- Coordinates: 37°22′39″N 50°07′35″E
- Country: Iran
- Province: Gilan
- County: Astaneh-ye Ashrafiyeh
- District: Kiashahr
- Rural District: Dehgah

Population (2016)
  - Total: 889
- Time zone: UTC+3:30 (IRST)

Lukh (Persian: لوخ) (Note: Also romanized as Lūkh) is a village in Dehgah Rural District of Kiashahr District in Astaneh-ye Ashrafiyeh County, Gilan province, Iran.

== Demographics ==
=== Population ===
At the time of the 2006 National Census, the village's population was 959 in 287 households. The following census in 2011 counted 848 people in 305 households. The 2016 census measured the population of the village as 889 people in 329 households.
