= Seyqaldeh, Astaneh-ye Ashrafiyeh =

Village in Gilan province, Iran

Seyqaldeh Persian: صيقل ده
- Village
- Location within Iran
- Coordinates: 37°22′12″N 50°04′57″E
- Country: Iran
- Province: Gilan
- County: Astaneh-ye Ashrafiyeh
- District: Kiashahr
- Rural District: Dehgah

Population (2016)
  - Total: 164
- Time zone: UTC+3:30 (IRST)

Seyqaldeh (Persian: صيقل ده) (Note: Also romanized as Şeyqaldeh; also known as Şeyqalandeh) is a village in Dehgah Rural District of Kiashahr District in Astaneh-ye Ashrafiyeh County, Gilan province, Iran.

== Demographics ==
=== Population ===
At the time of the 2006 National Census, the village's population was 201 in 62 households. The following census in 2011 counted 161 people in 57 households. The 2016 census measured the population of the village as 164 people in 67 households.
