= Lasku Kalayeh =

Village in Gilan province, Iran

Lasku Kalayeh Persian: لسكو كلايه
- Village
- Location within Iran
- Coordinates: 37°22′39″N 50°01′44″E
- Country: Iran
- Province: Gilan
- County: Astaneh-ye Ashrafiyeh
- District: Kiashahr
- Rural District: Kiashahr

Population (2016)
  - Total: 1,555
- Time zone: UTC+3:30 (IRST)

Lasku Kalayeh (Persian: لسكوكلايه) (Note: Also romanized as Laskū Kalāyeh and Leskū Kelāyeh) is a village in Kiashahr Rural District of Kiashahr District in Astaneh-ye Ashrafiyeh County, Gilan province, Iran.

== Demographics ==
=== Population ===
At the time of the 2006 National Census, the village's population was 1,943 in 640 households. The following census in 2011 counted 1,715 people in 635 households. The 2016 census measured the population of the village as 1,555 people in 609 households. It was the most populous village in its rural district.
