= Mohsenabad, Gilan =

Village in Gilan province, Iran

Mohsenabad Persian: محسن اباد
- Village
- Location within Iran
- Coordinates: 37°22′40″N 50°08′40″E
- Country: Iran
- Province: Gilan
- County: Astaneh-ye Ashrafiyeh
- District: Kiashahr
- Rural District: Dehgah

Population (2016)
  - Total: 631
- Time zone: UTC+3:30 (IRST)

Mohsenabad (Persian: محسن اباد) (Note: Also romanized as Moḩsenābād; also known as Moḩsenābād-e Pā’īn) is a village in Dehgah Rural District of Kiashahr District in Astaneh-ye Ashrafiyeh County, Gilan province, Iran.

== Demographics ==
=== Population ===
At the time of the 2006 National Census, the village's population was 715 in 221 households. The following census in 2011 counted 598 people in 218 households. The 2016 census measured the population of the village as 631 people in 237 households.
