= Lasht-e Nesha =

City in Gilan province, Iran

Lasht-e Nesha Persian: لشت نشا
- City
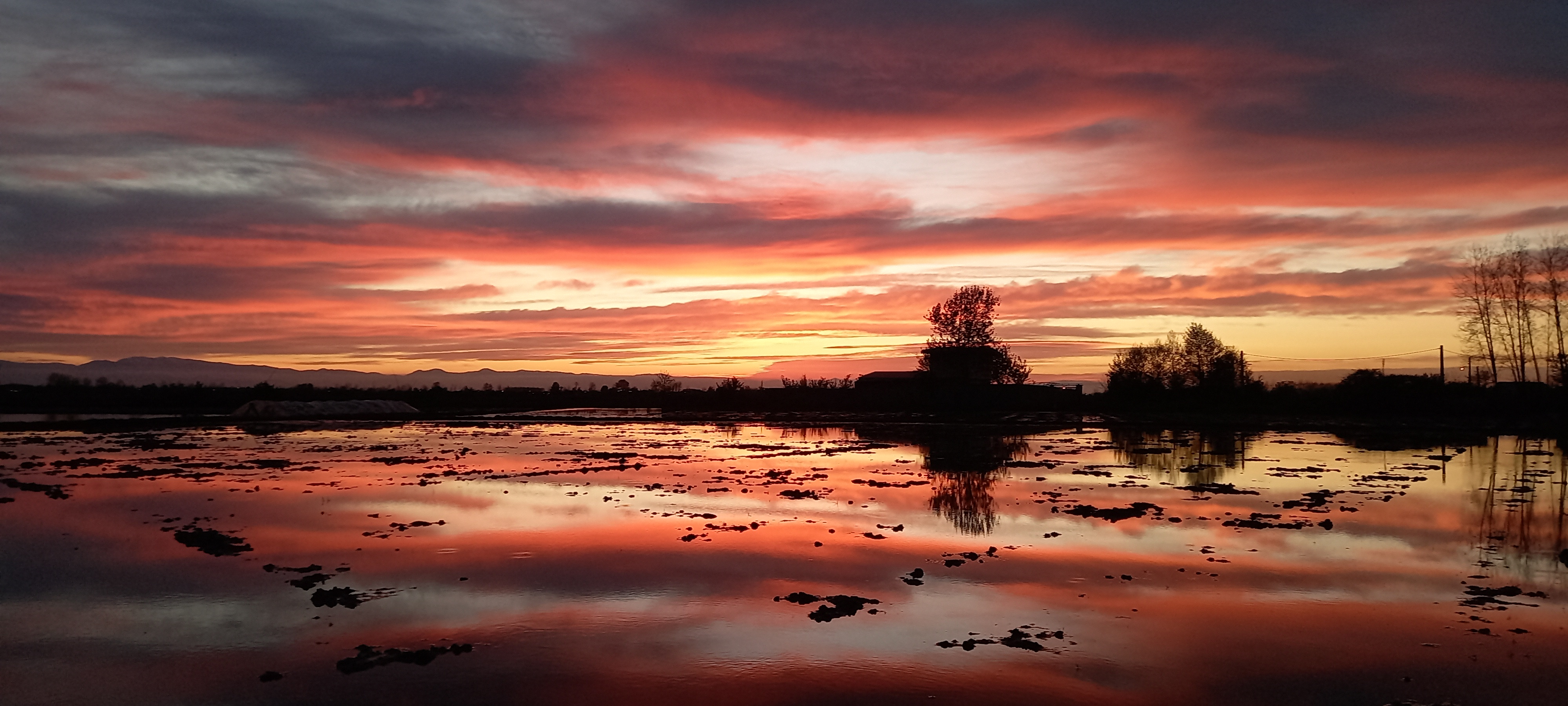

- Location within Iran
- Coordinates: 37°21′39″N 49°51′40″E
- Country: Iran
- Province: Gilan
- County: Rasht
- District: Lasht-e Nesha

Government
  - Mayor: Mostafa Abbasdoost

Population (2016)
  - Total: 10,539
- Time zone: UTC+3:30 (IRST)

Lasht-e Nesha (Persian: لشت نشا) (Note: Also romanized as Lasht Neshā, Lasht-e Neshā, and Lashteneshā; Gilaki: لشت ٚ نيشا) is a city in, and the capital of, Lasht-e Nesha District of Rasht County, Gilan province, Iran.

== History ==
Lasht-e Nesha is one of the oldest cities of Gilan; its history dates back to before the presence of Islam in the region. The town takes its name from a local legend. According to this legend, a long time ago, this area was ruled by a barbaric governor named Marvan who treated his people cruelly. On a spring day, Marvan and his men were inspecting the rice fields while women farmers were working and planting rice seeds. They were attacked by women farmers for their harassment. Marvan was killed and his body was planted under the clay soils of the rice field. Since then this area became known as Lasht-e Nesha (the planted corpse).

== Demographics ==
=== Population ===
At the time of the 2006 National Census, the city's population was 10,871 in 3,270 households. The following census in 2011 counted 10,662 people in 3,598 households. The 2016 census measured the population of the city as 10,539 people in 3,742 households.

== Geography ==
Lasht-e Nesha is located near the Caspian Sea and surrounded with rice fields. The city has an area of 5.23 square kilometers. It is about 30 kilometers away from the capital of Gilan, Rasht.
