= Mian Mahalleh-ye Gafsheh =

Village in Gilan province, Iran

Mian Mahalleh-ye Gafsheh Persian: ميان محله گفشه
- Village
- Location within Iran
- Coordinates: 37°20′26″N 49°49′47″E
- Country: Iran
- Province: Gilan
- County: Rasht
- District: Lasht-e Nesha
- Rural District: Gafsheh-ye Lasht-e Nesha

Population (2016)
  - Total: 478
- Time zone: UTC+3:30 (IRST)

Mian Mahalleh-ye Gafsheh (Persian: ميان محله گفشه) (Note: Also romanized as Mīān Maḩalleh-ye Gafsheh; also known as Mīān Gafsheh) is a village in Gafsheh-ye Lasht-e Nesha Rural District of Lasht-e Nesha District in Rasht County, Gilan province, Iran.

== Demographics ==
=== Population ===
At the time of the 2006 National Census, the village's population was 583 in 192 households. The following census in 2011 counted 381 people in 131 households. The 2016 census measured the population of the village as 478 people in 192 households.
