= Mohsenabad, Yazd =

Mohsenabad محسن اباد
- Village
- Country: Iran
- Province: Yazd
- County: Taft
- Bakhsh: Central
- Rural District: Nasrabad

Population (2006)
  - Total: 41
- Time zone: UTC+3:30 (IRST)
  - Summer (DST): UTC+4:30 (IRDT)

Mohsenabad (Persian: محسن اباد, romanized: Moḩsenābād) is a village in Nasrabad Rural District, in the Central District of Taft County, Yazd Province, Iran. At the 2006 census, its population was 41, in 14 families.
