= Kiashahr =

City in Gilan province, Iran

Kiashahr Persian: كياشهر
- City
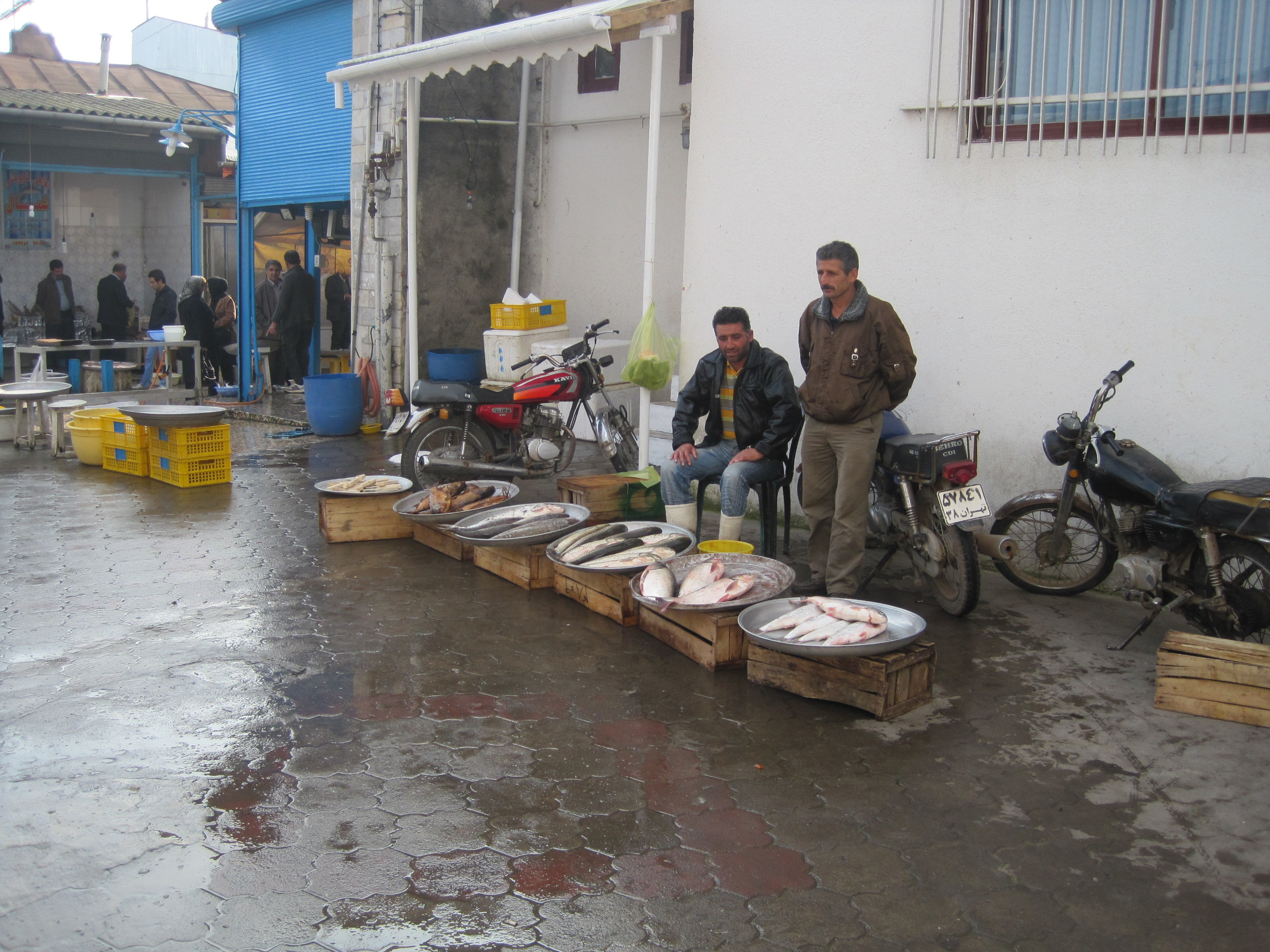

- Location within Iran
- Coordinates: 37°25′17″N 49°56′27″E
- Country: Iran
- Province: Gilan
- County: Astaneh-ye Ashrafiyeh
- District: Kiashahr

Population (2016)
  - Total: 14,022
- Time zone: UTC+3:30 (IRST)

Kiashahr (Persian: كياشهر) (Note: Also romanized as Kīāshahr and Kīyā Shahr; also known as Bandar-e Kīāshahr and Bandar-e-Kīyā Shahr; formerly Bandar-e Faraḩnāz) is a city in, and the capital of, Kiashahr District in Astaneh-ye Ashrafiyeh County, Gilan province, Iran.

== Demographics ==
=== Population ===
At the time of the 2006 National Census, the city's population was 13,762 in 4,069 households. The following census in 2011 counted 13,753 people in 4,601 households. The 2016 census measured the population of the city as 14,022 people in 5,037 households.

== Overview ==
Kiashahr port is a beautiful green city in the north of Iran. The Sefidrud river is the biggest of river in northern Iran, which flows into the Caspian Sea through Kiashahr beach. There is the Bojagh lagoon in Kiashar; it is the environment of many migratory birds. Fishery and agriculture are the main occupations in Kiashahr. The rice of Kiashahr is some of the best in Iran.

There is a wooden bridge that connects the city to the beach through the Bojagh lagoon. In Kiashahr there is a bazaar (Chahar Shanbeh Bazaar) on Wednesdays and people of all occupations sell their products. The fishery in Kiashahr is very old, and was used by Russia in 1885 when they came to Iran to fish for caviar.
