= Mohsenabad, Maragheh =

Mohsenabad محسن اباد
- Village
- Location within Iran
- Coordinates: 37°15′44″N 46°34′29″E
- Country: Iran
- Province: East Azerbaijan
- County: Maragheh
- Bakhsh: Saraju
- Rural District: Sarajuy-ye Sharqi

Population (2006)
  - Total: 167
- Time zone: UTC+3:30 (IRST)
  - Summer (DST): UTC+4:30 (IRDT)

Mohsenabad (Persian: محسن اباد, also Romanized as Moḩsenābād) is a village in Sarajuy-ye Sharqi Rural District, Saraju District, Maragheh County, East Azerbaijan Province, Iran. At the 2006 census, its population was 167, in 30 families.
