= Dastak, Iran =

Village in Gilan province, Iran

Dastak Persian: دستک
- Village
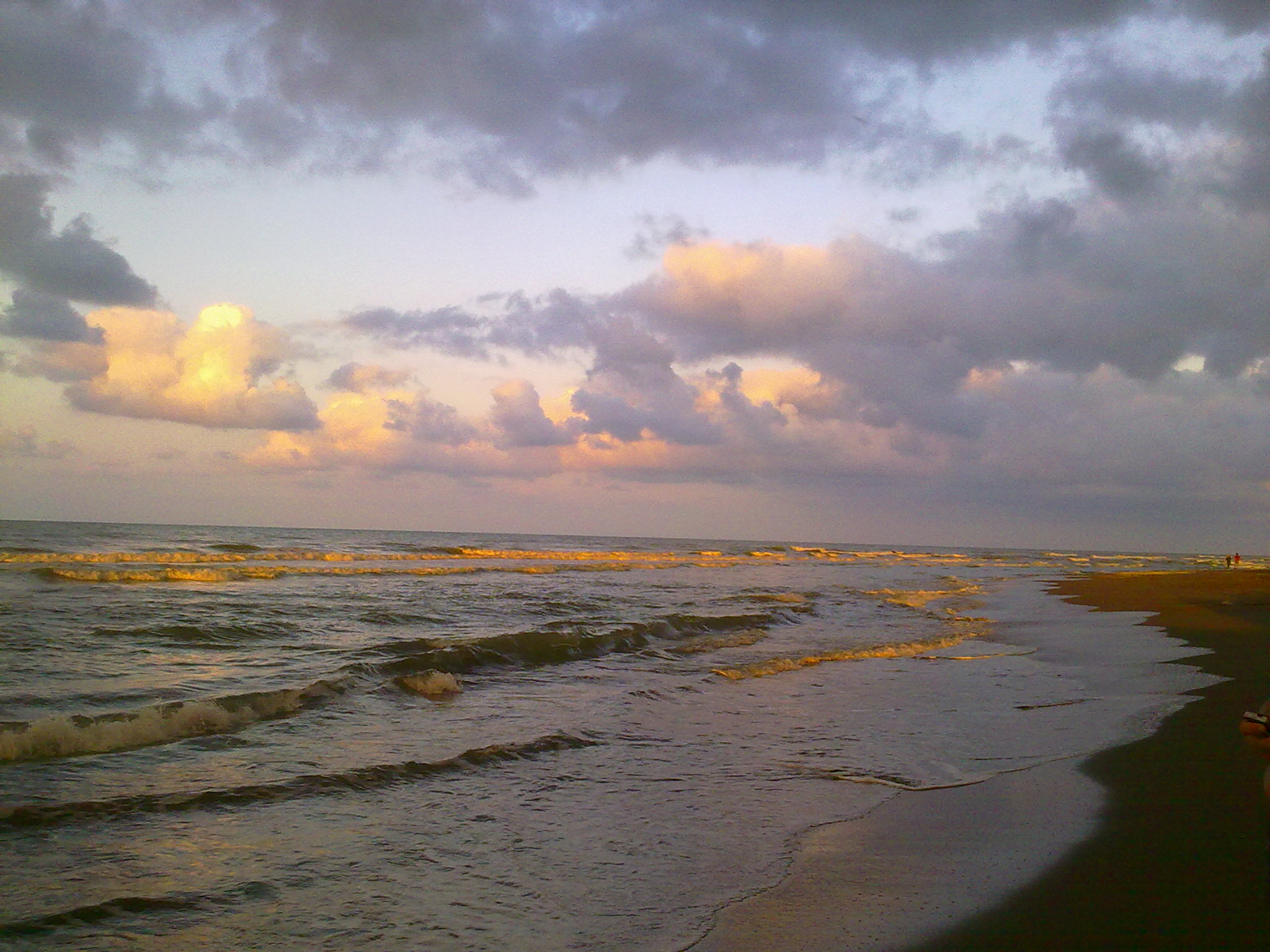
- Dastak beach

- Location within Iran
- Coordinates: 37°23′05″N 50°08′34″E
- Country: Iran
- Province: Gilan
- County: Astaneh-ye Ashrafiyeh
- District: Kiashahr
- Rural District: Dehgah

Population (2016)
  - Total: 2,122
- Time zone: UTC+3:30 (IRST)

Dastak (Persian: دستک) is a village in Dehgah Rural District of Kiashahr District in Astaneh-ye Ashrafiyeh County, Gilan province, Iran.

== Demographics ==
=== Population ===
At the time of the 2006 National Census, the village's population was 2,015 in 611 households. The following census in 2011 counted 2,051 people in 697 households. The 2016 census measured the population of the village as 2,122 people in 755 households. It was the most populous village in its rural district.
