= Kiashahr Rural District =

Rural district in Gilan province, Iran

Kiashahr Rural District Persian: دهستان کیاشهر
- Rural District
- Location within Iran
- Coordinates: 37°24′N 49°58′E
- Country: Iran
- Province: Gilan
- County: Astaneh-ye Ashrafiyeh
- District: Kiashahr
- Established: 1987
- Capital: Deh Sar

Population (2016)
  - Total: 9,515
- Time zone: UTC+3:30 (IRST)

Kiashahr Rural District (Persian: دهستان کیاشهر) is in Kiashahr District of Astaneh-ye Ashrafiyeh County, Gilan province, Iran. Its capital is the village of Deh Sar.

== Demographics ==
=== Population ===
At the time of the 2006 National Census, the rural district's population was 10,340 in 3,083 households. There were 9,580 inhabitants in 3,261 households at the following census of 2011. The 2016 census measured the population of the rural district as 9,515 in 3,425 households. The most populous of its 16 villages was Lasku Kalayeh, with 1,555 people.

=== Other villages in the rural district ===
- Amir Kia Sar
- Eshman-e Dehgah
- Eshman-e Kamachal
- Lab-e Darya-ye Lasku Kalayeh
- Lakuzhdeh
- Lasku Kalayeh
- Mohsenabad-e Pain
- Nabi Dehga
- Noqreh Deh
- Now Bijar Mahalleh-ye Mohsenabad
- Safra Basteh
- Salak Deh
- Zarem Kalayeh
