= Gafsheh-ye Lasht-e Nesha Rural District =

Rural district in Gilan province, Iran

Gafsheh-ye Lasht-e Nesha Rural District Persian: دهستان گفشه لشت نشا
- Rural District
- Location within Iran
- Coordinates: 37°21′N 49°49′E
- Country: Iran
- Province: Gilan
- County: Rasht
- District: Lasht-e Nesha
- Established: 1987
- Capital: Bala Mahalleh-ye Gafsheh

Population (2016)
  - Total: 7,799
- Time zone: UTC+3:30 (IRST)

Gafsheh-ye Lasht-e Nesha Rural District (Persian: دهستان گفشه لشت نشا) is in Lasht-e Nesha District of Rasht County, Gilan province, Iran. Its capital is the village of Bala Mahalleh-ye Gafsheh.

== Demographics ==
=== Population ===
At the time of the 2006 National Census, the rural district's population was 9,187 in 2,867 households. There were 8,072 inhabitants in 2,794 households at the following census of 2011. The 2016 census measured the population of the rural district as 7,799 in 2,835 households. The most populous of its 16 villages was Bala Mahalleh-ye Gafsheh, with 1,533 people.

=== Other villages in the rural district ===
- Aji Buzayeh
- Ali Bozayeh
- Chafu Chah
- Chalikdan
- Chapak-e Nazemi Mahalleh
- Chapak-e Shafi Mahalleh
- Estalak
- Ju Posht
- Juryab
- Kenar Sar-e Arbabi
- Laleh Gafsheh
- Limu Chah
- Mian Mahalleh-ye Gafsheh
- Pas Bijar Gafsheh
- Sheykhan Gafsheh
