= Aliabad-e Ziba Kenar Rural District =

Rural district in Gilan province, Iran

Aliabad-e Ziba Kenar Rural District Persian: دهستان علی‌آباد زیباکنار
- Rural District
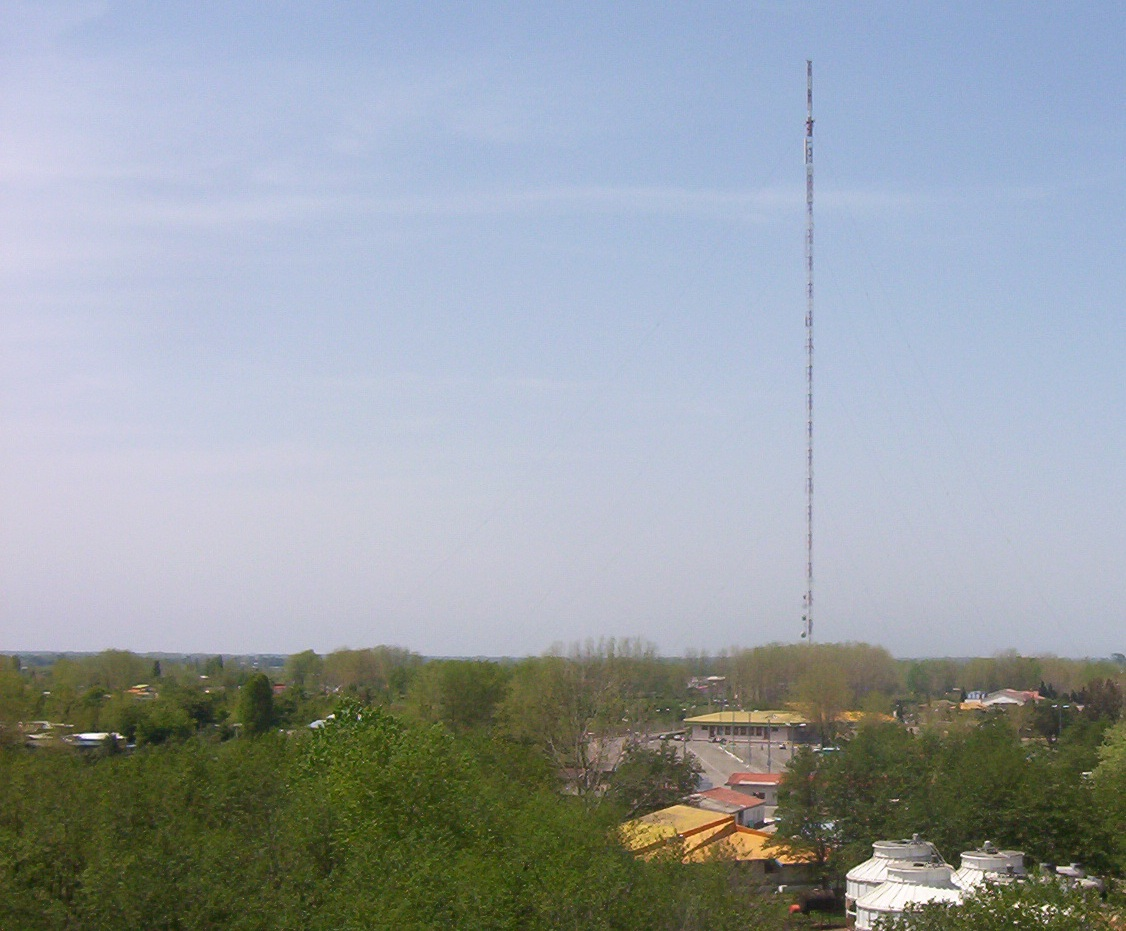
- Ziba Kenar television tower

- Location within Iran
- Coordinates: 37°25′N 49°52′E
- Country: Iran
- Province: Gilan
- County: Rasht
- District: Lasht-e Nesha
- Established: 1987
- Capital: Ziba Kenar

Population (2016)
  - Total: 7,764
- Time zone: UTC+3:30 (IRST)

Aliabad-e Ziba Kenar Rural District (Persian: دهستان علی‌آباد زیباکنار) is in Lasht-e Nesha District of Rasht County, Gilan province, Iran. Its capital is the village of Ziba Kenar.

== Demographics ==
=== Population ===
At the time of the 2006 National Census, the rural district's population was 9,606 in 2,906 households. There were 9,215 inhabitants in 3,124 households at the following census of 2011. The 2016 census measured the population of the rural district as 7,764 in 2,789 households. The most populous of its 14 villages was Ziba Kenar, with 1,522 people.

=== Other villages in the rural district ===
- Amildan
- Azhdeha Baluch
- Chalekash-e Lat
- Chunchenan
- Dovaj
- Fakhrabad
- Jelidan
- Khoshk Estalkh
- Malekdeh
- Nowdeh
- Shahmir Sara
- Tazehabad
