= Kiashahr District =

District in Gilan province, Iran

Kiashahr District Persian: بخش کیاشهر
- District
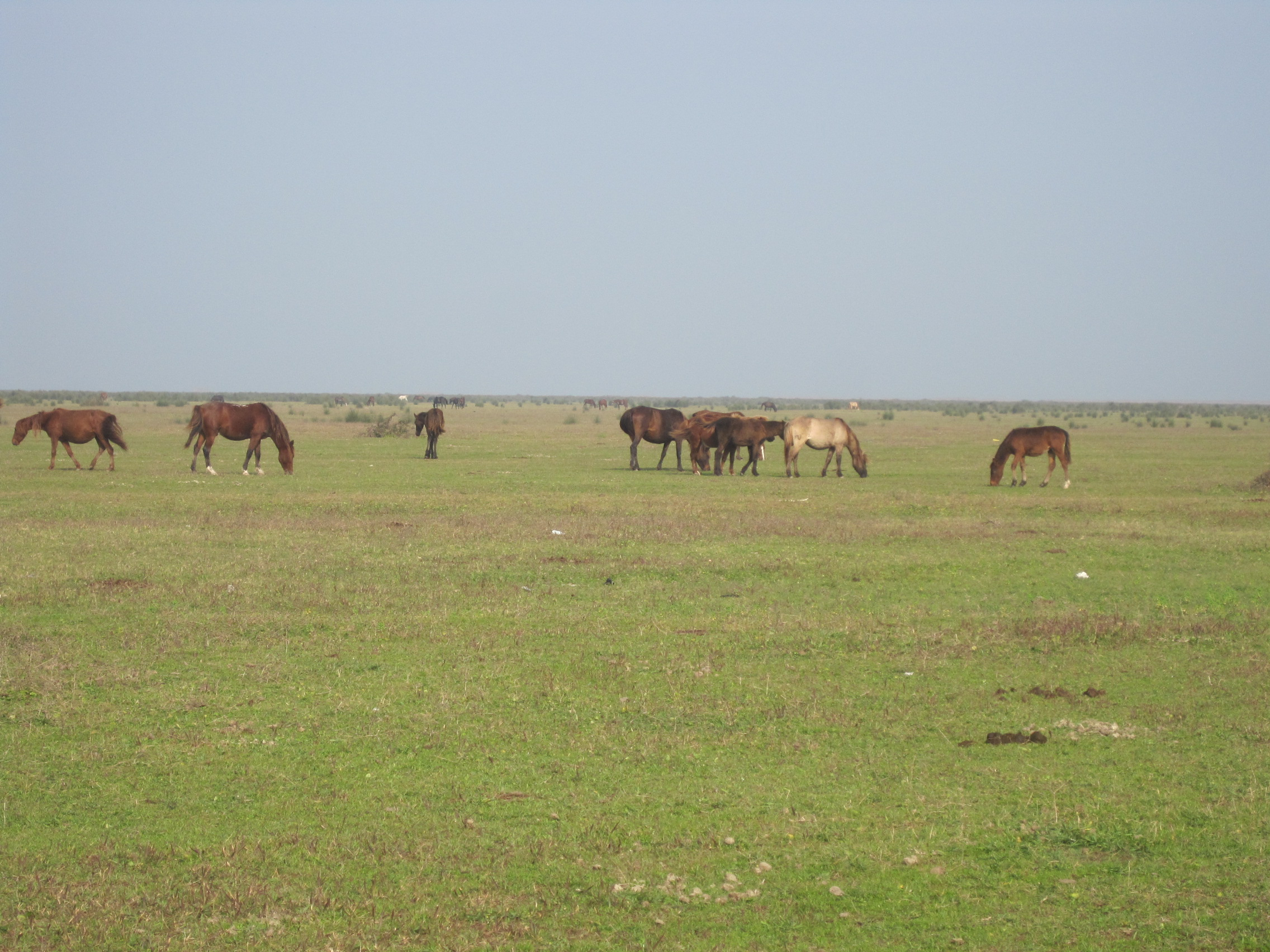
- Bujaq National Park, Kiashahr

- Location within Iran
- Coordinates: 37°24′N 50°02′E
- Country: Iran
- Province: Gilan
- County: Astaneh-ye Ashrafiyeh
- Capital: Kiashahr

Population (2016)
  - Total: 33,085
- Time zone: UTC+3:30 (IRST)

Kiashahr District (Persian: بخش کیاشهر) is in Astaneh-ye Ashrafiyeh County, Gilan province, Iran. Its capital is the city of Kiashahr.

== Demographics ==
=== Population ===
At the time of the 2006 National Census, the district's population was 34,934 in 10,510 households. The following census in 2011 counted 33,138 people in 11,319 households. The 2016 census measured the population of the district as 33,085 inhabitants in 11,999 households.

=== Administrative divisions ===
Kiashahr District Population
Administrative Divisions	2006	2011	2016
Dehgah RD	10,832	9,805	9,548
Kiashahr RD	10,340	9,580	9,515
Kiashahr (city)	13,762	13,753	14,022
Total	34,934	33,138	33,085
RD = Rural District
