= Lasht-e Nesha District =

District in Gilan province, Iran

Lasht-e Nesha District Persian: بخش لشت نشا
- District
- Location within Iran
- Coordinates: 37°23′N 49°51′E
- Country: Iran
- Province: Gilan
- County: Rasht
- Capital: Lasht-e Nesha

Population (2016)
  - Total: 31,894
- Time zone: UTC+3:30 (IRST)

Lasht-e Nesha District (Persian: بخش لشت نشا) is in Rasht County, Gilan province, Iran. Its capital is the city of Lasht-e Nesha.

== Demographics ==
=== Population ===
At the time of the 2006 National Census, the district's population was 36,316 in 11,006 households. The following census in 2011 counted 33,972 people in 11,550 households. The 2016 census measured the population of the district as 31,894 inhabitants in 11,479 households.

=== Administrative divisions ===
Lasht-e Nesha District Population
Administrative Divisions	2006	2011	2016
Aliabad-e Ziba Kenar RD	9,606	9,215	7,764
Gafsheh-ye Lasht-e Nesha RD	9,187	8,072	7,799
Jirhandeh-ye Lasht-e Nesha RD	6,652	6,023	5,792
Lasht-e Nesha (city)	10,871	10,662	10,539
Total	36,316	33,972	31,894
RD = Rural District
