= Heyran, Astara =

Cluster of villages in Gilan province, Iran

Heyran Persian: حيران
- Cluster of Villages
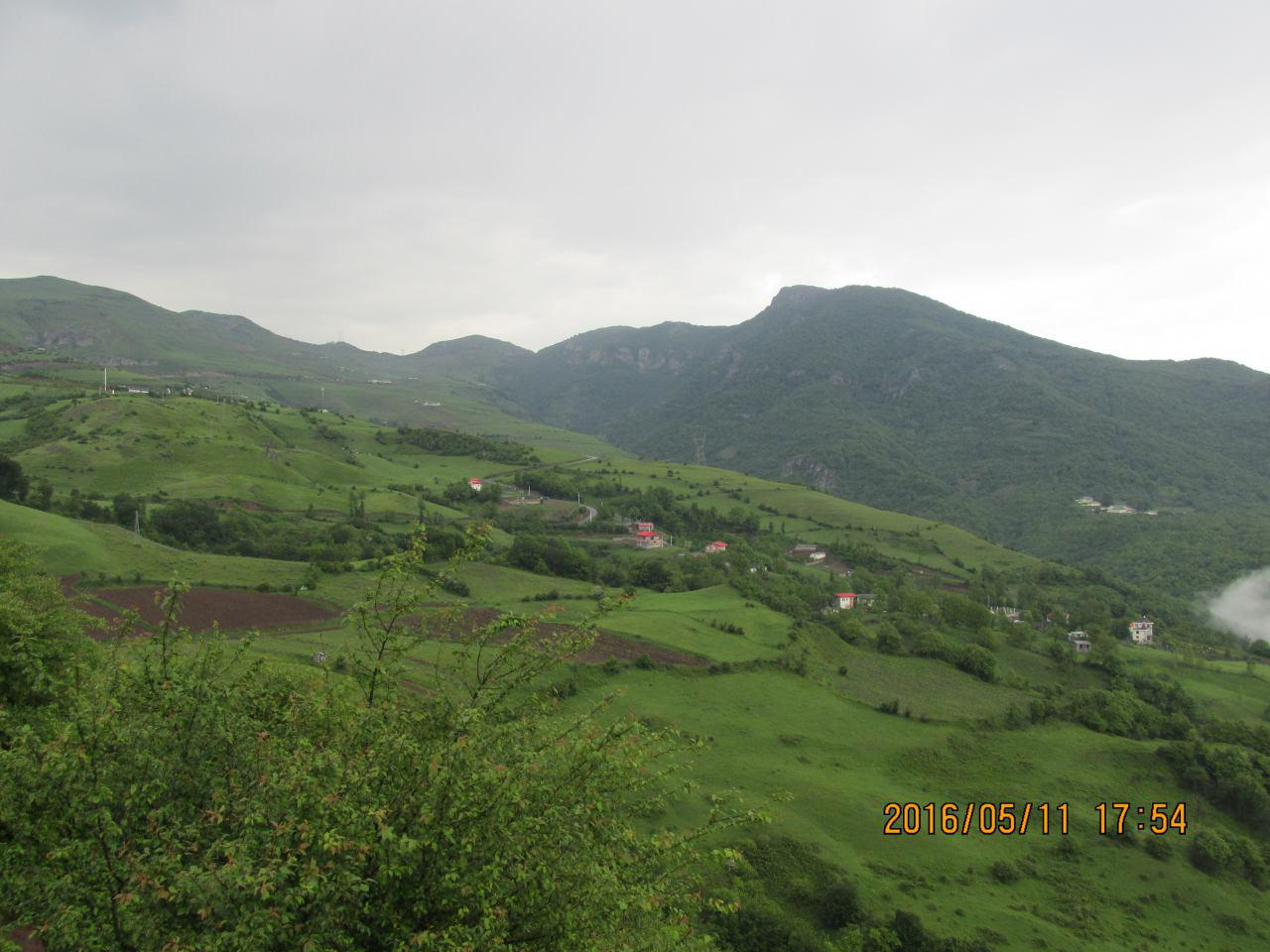
- Heyran

- Location within Iran
- Coordinates: 38°25′23″N 48°34′21″E
- Country: Iran
- Province: Gilan
- County: Astara
- District: Central
- Rural District: Heyran
- Time zone: UTC+3:30 (IRST)

Heyran (Persian: حیران) is a cluster of three villages in the Talysh Mountains, a subrange of the western Alborz mountain range, within Astara County of Gilan province in far northwestern Iran.

== Geography ==
The three villages are:

- Heyran-e Olya, or Upper Heyran
- Heyran-e Vosta, or Middle Heyran
- Heyran-e Sofla, or Lower Heyran

The villages are 30 kilometres (19 mi) northwest of Astara, on the road to Ardabil.

Winters are cold and snowy; summers are cool.

== Tourism ==
Heyran is one of the most famous tourist destinations in Iran, due to the beautiful and accessible scenery.

The Heyran Gondola lift is above the villages, at a higher altitude in the Alborz.

== See also ==
- Laton Waterfall
- Alborz (Elburz) mountain range topics
