= Estil Lagoon =

Coordinates: 38.3719°N 48.8496°E

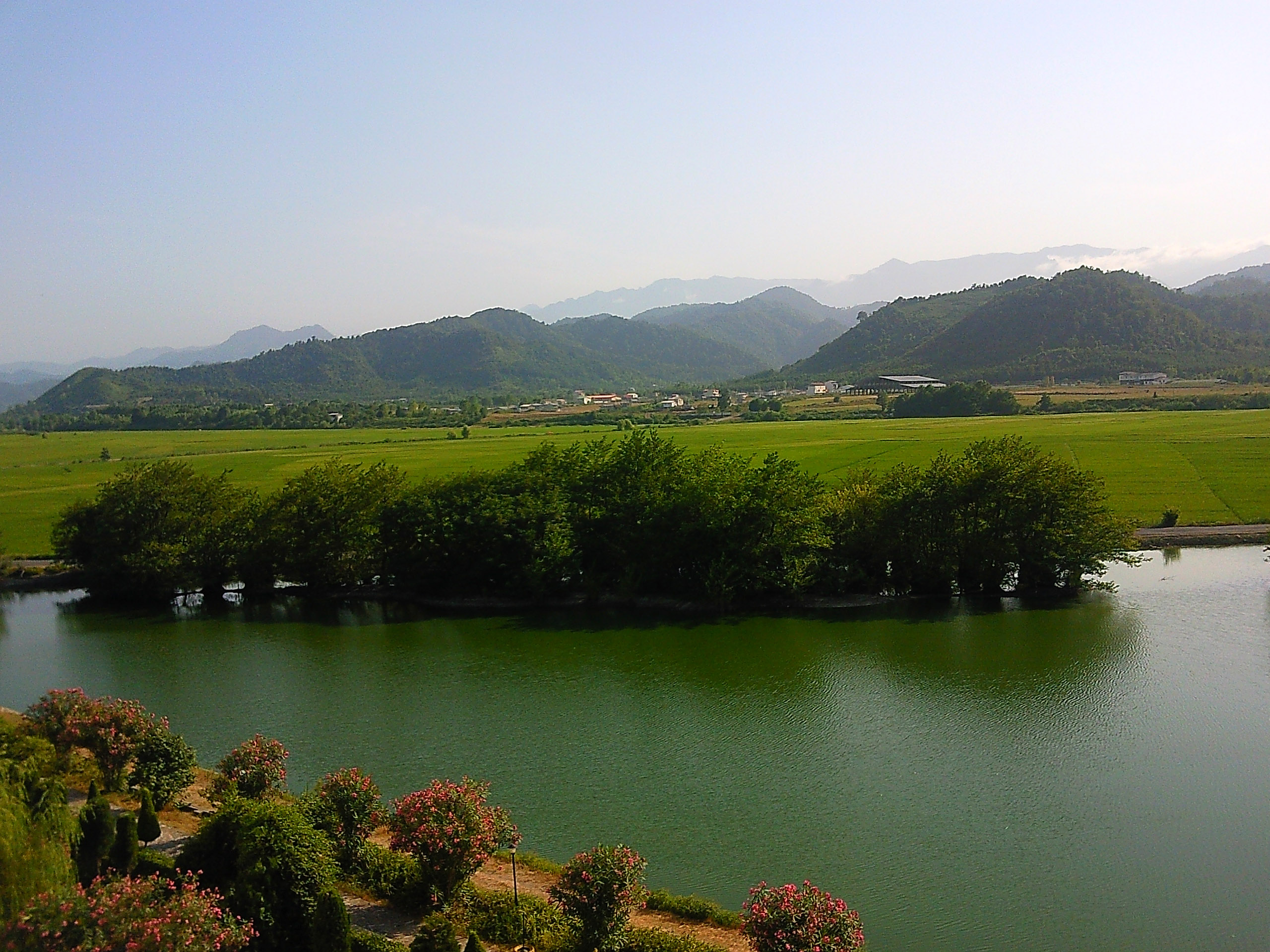

- Location within Iran
- Location: Gilan Province
- Type: Lagoon
- Basin countries: Iran
- Max. length: 1.63 kilometres (1.01 mi)
- Max. width: 1.07 kilometres (0.66 mi)
- Surface area: 138 acres (56 ha)
- Islands: much swampy area in lagoon
- Settlements: Astara, Iran

Estil Lagoon (Persian: تالاب استیل), One of the tourist attractions near Astara city, Iran. Located along the Astara – Rasht road. This Lagoon is 138 acres. Estil Lagoon has been identified as one of the top five places of tourism in the Gilan Province in 2005 .

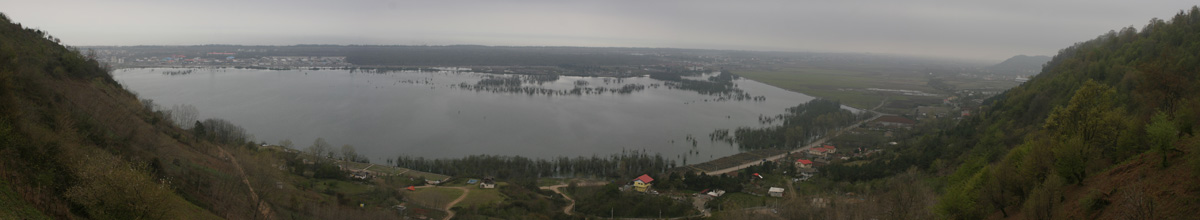
Perspective Estil Lagoon
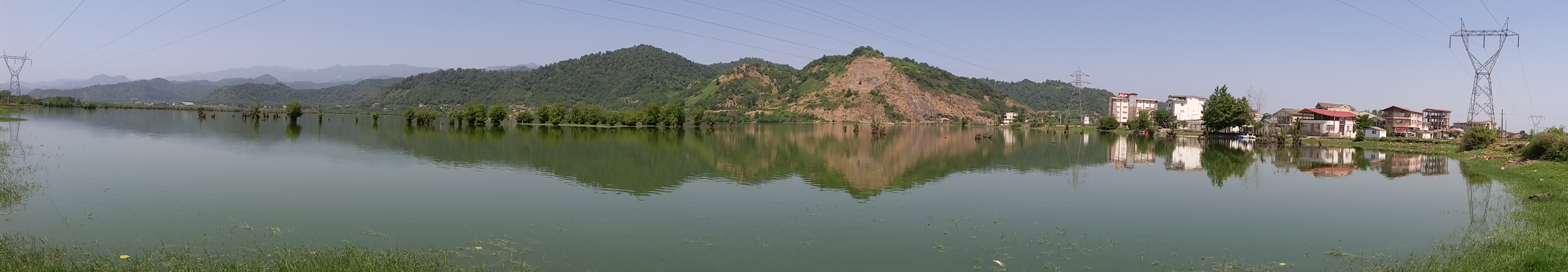
Perspective Estil Lagoon

== Biodiversity ==
Estil Lagoon is an important habitat for a variety of migratory and resident bird species. During the colder months, it serves as a wintering ground for rare birds that migrate from Central Europe, the Caspian Sea region, and polar areas. Notable waterbirds that visit the lagoon include the whooper swan, mute swan, Dalmatian pelican, mallard, common teal, Eurasian coot, black-headed gull, common gull, little gull, and common goldeneye. Resident birds of the lagoon include the great cormorant, pygmy cormorant, black-crowned night heron, grey heron, and species of grebes. In addition to birds, Estil Lagoon is home to the nutria (Myocastor coypus), a semi-aquatic invasive rodent species that is considered the most notable mammal in the area. The lagoon also supports various fish species such as common carp, crucian carp, northern pike, grass carp, and silver carp. Reptiles and amphibians found in the lagoon include the dice snake (Natrix tessellata), the green-bellied lizard (Lacerta viridis), and the European pond turtle (Emys orbicularis).

The lagoon hosts diverse plant species, including alder (Alnus), boxwood (Buxus), and Persian ironwood (Parrotia persica). Contrary to popular belief, the trees in Estil Lagoon are not "floating"; rather, their roots are submerged in the lagoon's freshwater, but the trees themselves remain stationary.

== Threats ==
Estil Lagoon faces several environmental threats that jeopardize its ecological integrity. One significant concern is the deterioration of the birdwatching site established in 2019. Despite its initial purpose to promote ecotourism and environmental education, the site's infrastructure, including wooden bridges and observation huts, has fallen into disrepair due to neglect and lack of maintenance. This has led to the abandonment of the facilities, undermining conservation efforts and diminishing the lagoon's appeal as a destination for nature enthusiasts.

Another pressing issue is the proposed construction of the Rasht–Astara railway line, which is planned to pass through or near the lagoon area. Environmental experts warn that this development could severely disrupt the lagoon's delicate ecosystem, threatening its biodiversity and the habitats of numerous species. The railway project, while economically significant, poses a risk of irreversible ecological damage if environmental considerations are not adequately addressed.

== See also ==
- Heyran village, Astara
- Heyran Gondola lift, Astara
- Laton Waterfall
- Anzali Lagoon
- Astarachay
