= Hayran =

Hayran or Heyran may refer to:

== Music ==
- Hayran (vocal style), a Kurdish vocal style
- Hayran, an album by Egyptian singer Mohamed Fouad

== Places ==
- Hayran, Hınıs, a village in Erzurum Province, Turkey
- A hamlet named Hayran in Keklikdere, Genç, Turkey
- Hayran District, a district in Yemen
- Heyran Rural District, in Astara County, Gilan province, Iran
- Heyran, Astara, a village in Gilan province, Iran
- Heyran-e Sofla, a village in Gilan province, Iran
- Heyran, Hamadan, a village in Hamadan province, Iran
- Heyran, West Azerbaijan, a village in West Azerbaijan province, Iran

== People ==
- Heyran Donboli, Iranian poet and writer (also spelled Hayran)

== Other uses ==
- Heyran Gondola lift, a tourist gondola in Gilan province, Iran
