= Heyran =

Heyran or Hairan (Persian: حيران) may refer to:

- Heyran, Hamadan
- Heyran, West Azerbaijan
- Heyran-e Olya (disambiguation)
- Heyran-e Sofla, Gilan Province
- Heyran-e Vosta, Gilan Province
- Heyran Rural District, in Gilan Province
