= Abbasabad, Gilan =

Village in Gilan province, Iran

Abbasabad Persian: عباس آباد
- Village
- Location within Iran
- Coordinates: 38°23′18″N 48°50′39″E
- Country: Iran
- Province: Gilan
- County: Astara
- District: Central
- Rural District: Virmuni

Population (2016)
  - Total: 1,657
- Time zone: UTC+3:30 (IRST)

Abbasabad (Persian: عباس آباد) (Note: Also romanized as ‘Abbāsābād; also known as Morīdlar) is a village in Virmuni Rural District of the Central District in Astara County, Gilan province, Iran.

== Demographics ==
=== Language ===
Linguistic composition of the village.

Abbasabad linguistic composition
language	percent
Azerbaijani	90%
Talysh	10%

=== Population ===
At the time of the 2006 National Census, the village's population was 3,623 in 888 households. The following census in 2011 counted 1,674 people in 476 households. The 2016 census measured the population of the village as 1,657 people in 508 households.

== Attractions ==
Important places in this neighborhood include the Daneshjoo Park, Estil Lagoon Beach Park and Astara Bird Garden.
