= Hajiamir-e Pain =

Hajiamir-e Pain حاجی‌امیر پائین
- Village
- Location within Iran
- Coordinates: 38°25′N 48°36′E
- Country: Iran
- Province: Gilan
- County: Astara
- Bakhsh: Central
- Rural District: Heyran

Population (2006)
  - Total: ?
- Time zone: UTC+3:30 (IRST)
  - Summer (DST): UTC+4:30 (IRDT)

Hajiamir-e Pain (Persian: حاجی‌امیر پائین, also Romanized as Hajiamir-e Paein) is a village in Heyran Rural District, in the Central District of Astara County, Gilan Province, Iran.
