= Avaz Lar Sayyadlar =

Avaz Lar Sayyadlar عوض لرصيادلر
- Village
- Country: Iran
- Province: Gilan
- County: Astara
- Bakhsh: Central
- Rural District: Virmuni

Population (2006)
  - Total: 67
- Time zone: UTC+3:30 (IRST)
  - Summer (DST): UTC+4:30 (IRDT)

Avaz Lar Sayyadlar (Persian: عوض لرصيادلر, also Romanized as ʿAvaz̤ Lar Sayyādlar) is a village in Virmuni Rural District, in the Central District of Astara County, Gilan Province, Iran. At the 2006 census, its population was 67, in 15 families.

== Language ==
Linguistic composition of the village.

Avaz Lar Sayyadlar linguistic composition
language	percent
Talysh	80%
Azerbaijani	20%
