= Shundeh Chula =

Shundeh Chula شونده چولا
- Village
- Country: Iran
- Province: Gilan
- County: Astara
- Bakhsh: Central
- Rural District: Virmuni

Population (2006)
  - Total: 50
- Time zone: UTC+3:30 (IRST)
  - Summer (DST): UTC+4:30 (IRDT)

Shundeh Chula (Persian: شونده چولا, also Romanized as Shūndeh Chūlā) is a village in Virmuni Rural District, in the Central District of Astara County, Gilan Province, Iran. At the 2006 census, its population was 50, in 10 families.

== Language ==
Linguistic composition of the village.

Shundeh Chula linguistic composition
language	percent
Azerbaijani	90%
Talysh	10%
