= Astara (electoral district) =

Constituency of the Iranian parliament

- Electoral district constituency for the Islamic Consultative Assembly
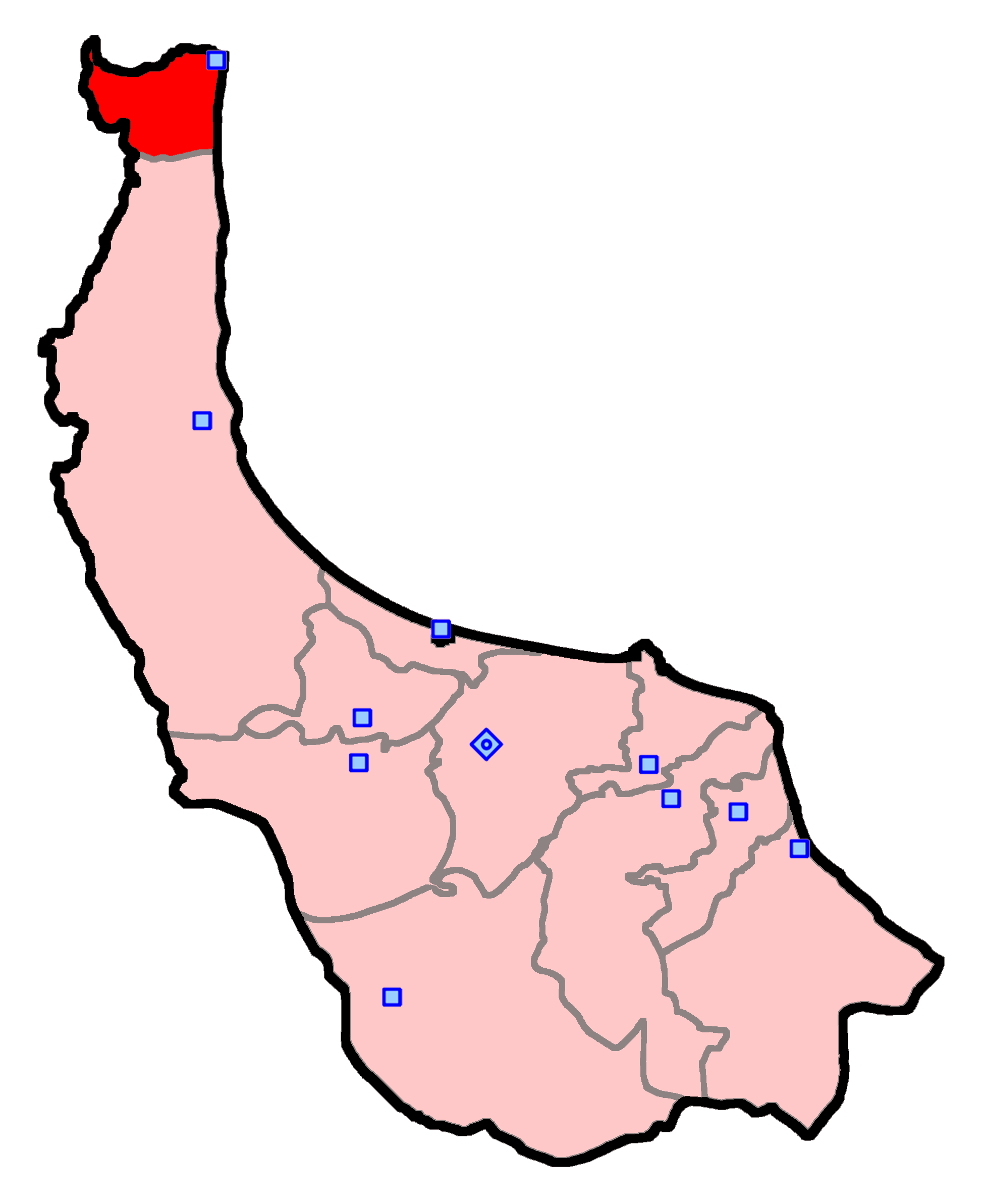
- Constituency highlighted in Gilan Province

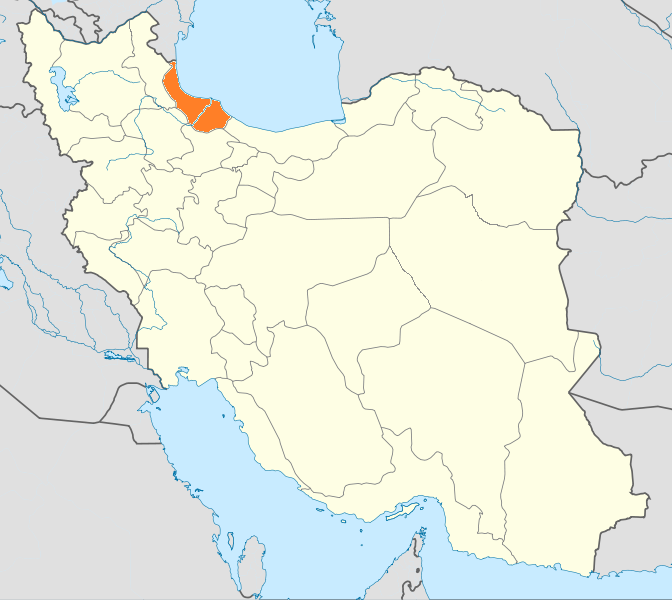
- Location of Gilan Province in Iran
- Province: Gilan
- Districts: Central District, Lavandevil District
- Population: 86,575
- Electorate: 61,365 (2016)
- Major settlements: Astara

Current constituency
- Created: 1980
- Number of members: 1 / 290 (0.3%)
- Party: Independent Politician
- Assembly Members: Vali Dadashi

Astara is an electoral district in the Gilan Province in Iran. This electoral district has 86,575 population and elects 1 member of parliament.

== Elections ==
=== 1st term ===
MP in 1980 from the electorate of Astara. (1st) (Run-off)

- Mohammad Farzpour Machiani

=== 2nd term ===
MP in 1984 from the electorate of Astara. (2nd) (Run-off)

- Esmaeil Ahani

=== 3rd term ===
MP in 1988 from the electorate of Astara. (3rd)

- Mohammad Farzpour Machiani

=== 4th term ===
MP in 1992 from the electorate of Astara. (4th)

- Shapour Marhaba

=== 5th term ===
MP in 1997 from the electorate of Astara. (5th) (By-election)

- Shapour Marhaba

=== 6th term ===
MP in 2000 from the electorate of Astara. (6th)

- Hassan Zahmatkesh

=== 7th term ===
MP in 2004 from the electorate of Astara. (7th)

- Shapour Marhaba

=== 8th term ===
MP in 2008 from the electorate of Astara. (8th)

- Farhad Dalghpoush

2008 Iranian legislative election
#	Candidate	Affiliation	Votes	%
1	Farhad Dalghpoush	Moderation and Development Party	18,269	42.09
2	Shapour Marhaba (inc.)	Principlists Pervasive Coalition	13,462	31.02
3	Alireza Nemati	United Front of Principlists	5,994	13.81
4	Safar Naeimi	Iranian specialists Association	4,493	10.35
5	Shahram Vaseli	Unlisted	809	1.86
6	Akbar Nooripour	Unlisted	64	0.15
7	Khosrow Shahin	Unlisted	47	0.11
Blank Votes			263	0.61
Total Votes			43,401	
Turnout			▼79.3%	

=== 9th term ===
MP in 2012 from the electorate of Astara. (9th)

- Safar Naeimi

2012 Iranian legislative election
#	Candidate	Affiliation	Votes	%
1	Safar Naeimi	Unlisted (Principlist)	24,062	48.93
2	Meysam Zarebnia	Unlisted (Reformist)	12,149	24.71
3	Alireza Nemati	United/Stability/Resistance Fronts	10,402	21.15
4	Asgar Ghani	Unlisted	1,190	2.42
Blank Votes			1,371	2.79
Total Votes			49,174	
Turnout			▲93.3%	

=== 10th term ===
MP in 2016 from the electorate of Astara. (10th)

- Vali Dadashi

2016 Iranian legislative election
#	Candidate	Affiliation	Votes	%
1	Vali Dadashi	Unlisted	14,173	27.86
2	Gholamreza Marhaba	PGC / FFLIL	10,608	20.85
3	Jalil Kariminejad	Unlisted (Principlist)	6,625	13.02
4	Bakhtiar Heydarnia	FPD / MDP (Note: He was endorsed from MDP but not endorsed from List of Hope.)	5,786	11.37
5	Meysam Zarebnia	Unlisted (Reformist)	3,160	6.21
6	Alireza Nemati	Unlisted (Principlist)	2,931	5.76
7	Dariush Heshmat	Unlisted	1,749	3.44
8	Keyvan Asadpour	Unlisted (Reformist)	1,607	3.17
9	Hossein Dehzadegan	Unlisted	1,155	2.27
10	Sakhavat Soleimannejad	Unlisted	726	1.43
11	Sirous Fayyazi	Unlisted	501	0.98
12	Rezvan Daryabian	Unlisted	324	0.64
13	Bahman Ebrahimi	Unlisted	247	0.49
14	Masoud Tarrari	Unlisted	72	0.14
15	Asgar Ghani	Unlisted	65	0.13
Blank Votes			1,137	2.24
Total Votes			50,866	
Turnout			▼82.89%	
