= Kuteh Kumeh =

Village in Gilan province, Iran

Kuteh Kumeh Persian: کوته کومه
- Village
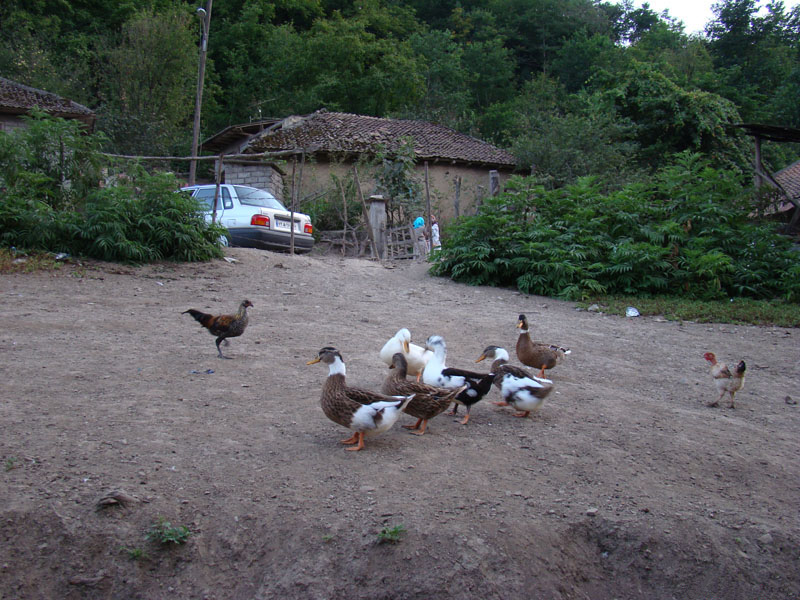
- The village of Kuteh Kumeh

- Location within Iran
- Coordinates: 38°18′18″N 48°48′08″E
- Country: Iran
- Province: Gilan
- County: Astara
- District: Lavandevil
- Rural District: Chelevand

Population (2016)
  - Total: 581
- Time zone: UTC+3:30 (IRST)

Kuteh Kumeh (Persian: كوته كومه) (Note: Also romanized as Kūteh Kūmeh) is a village in Chelevand Rural District of Lavandevil District in Astara County, Gilan province, Iran. The village is located nine kilometers from Lavandevil. The most attractive points of interest of Kuteh Kumeh are Latun (Barzov) waterfall and Gamo hot water spring.

== Demographics ==
=== Language and religion ===
The language of the residents of this region, who are mostly Sunni Muslims (Shafi‘i denomination), is Taleshi.

Linguistic composition of the village.

Kuteh Kumeh linguistic composition
language	percent
Talysh	100%

=== Population ===
At the time of the 2006 National Census, the village's population was 906 in 220 households. The following census in 2011 counted 592 people in 165 households. The 2016 census measured the population of the village as 581 people in 177 households.
