= Bibi Yanlu =

Bibi Yanlu بي بي يانلو
- Village
- Location within Iran
- Coordinates: 38°26′50″N 48°47′34″E
- Country: Iran
- Province: Gilan
- County: Astara
- Bakhsh: Central
- Rural District: Virmuni

Population (2006)
  - Total: 42
- Time zone: UTC+3:30 (IRST)
  - Summer (DST): UTC+4:30 (IRDT)

Bibi Yanlu (Persian: بي بي يانلو, also Romanized as Bībī Yānlū) is a village in Virmuni Rural District, in the Central District of Astara County, Gilan Province, Iran. At the 2006 census, its population was 42, in 10 families.
