= Kashfi =

Kashfi كشفي
- Village
- Location within Iran
- Coordinates: 38°25′55″N 48°46′00″E
- Country: Iran
- Province: Gilan
- County: Astara
- Bakhsh: Central
- Rural District: Virmuni

Population (2006)
  - Total: 131
- Time zone: UTC+3:30 (IRST)
  - Summer (DST): UTC+4:30 (IRDT)

Kashfi (Persian: كشفي, also Romanized as Kashfī and Keshefi) is a village in Virmuni Rural District, in the Central District of Astara County, Gilan Province, Iran. At the 2006 census, its population was 131, in 27 families.

== Language ==
Linguistic composition of the village.

Kashfi linguistic composition
| language | percent |
| Azerbaijani | 80% |
| Talysh | 20% |
