= Khanehhay-e Asiab =

Khanehhay-e Asiab خانه هاي اسياب
- Village
- Location within Iran
- Coordinates: 38°24′14″N 48°47′21″E
- Country: Iran
- Province: Gilan
- County: Astara
- Bakhsh: Central
- Rural District: Virmuni

Population (2006)
  - Total: 803
- Time zone: UTC+3:30 (IRST)
  - Summer (DST): UTC+4:30 (IRDT)

Khanehhay-e Asiab (Persian: خانه هاي اسياب, also Romanized as Khānehhāy-e Āsīāb; also known as Khānehhā-ye Āsīāb) is a village in Virmuni Rural District, in the Central District of Astara County, Gilan Province, Iran. At the 2006 census, its population was 803, in 190 families.

== Language ==
Linguistic composition of the village.

Khanehhay-e Asiab linguistic composition
language	percent
Talysh	90%
Azerbaijani	10%
