= Lemir Mahalleh =

Lemir Mahalleh لميرمحله
- Village
- Country: Iran
- Province: Gilan
- County: Astara
- Bakhsh: Central
- Rural District: Virmuni

Population (2006)
  - Total: 296
- Time zone: UTC+3:30 (IRST)
  - Summer (DST): UTC+4:30 (IRDT)

Lemir Mahalleh (Persian: لميرمحله, also Romanized as Lemīr Maḩalleh) is a village in Virmuni Rural District, in the Central District of Astara County, Gilan Province, Iran. At the 2006 census, its population was 296, in 74 families.

== Language ==
Linguistic composition of the village.

Lemir Mahalleh linguistic composition
language	percent
Talysh	80%
Azerbaijani	20%
