= Teleh Khan =

Teleh Khan تله خان
- Village
- Location within Iran
- Coordinates: 38°22′34″N 48°48′28″E
- Country: Iran
- Province: Gilan
- County: Astara
- Bakhsh: Central
- Rural District: Virmuni

Population (2006)
  - Total: 92
- Time zone: UTC+3:30 (IRST)
  - Summer (DST): UTC+4:30 (IRDT)

Teleh Khan (Persian: تله خان, also Romanized as Teleh Khān; also known as Tīleh Khān) is a village in Virmuni Rural District, in the Central District of Astara County, Gilan Province, Iran. At the 2006 census, its population was 92, in 20 families.

== Language ==
Linguistic composition of the village.

Teleh Khan linguistic composition
| language | percent |
| Azerbaijani | 70% |
| Talysh | 30% |
