= Dileh =

Village in Gilan province, Iran

Dileh Persian: ديله
- Village
- Location within Iran
- Coordinates: 38°20′02″N 48°46′57″E
- Country: Iran
- Province: Gilan
- County: Astara
- District: Lavandevil
- Rural District: Lavandevil

Population (2016)
  - Total: 34
- Time zone: UTC+3:30 (IRST)

Dileh (Persian: ديله) (Note: Also romanized as Dīleh) is a village in Lavandevil Rural District of Lavandevil District in Astara County, Gilan province, Iran.

== Demographics ==
=== Population ===
At the time of the 2006 National Census, the village's population was 71 in 12 households. The following census in 2011 counted 66 people in 11 households. The 2016 census measured the population of the village as 34 people in 12 households.
