= Hajji Amir-e Vanehbin =

Village in Gilan province, Iran

Hajji Amir-e Vanehbin Persian: حاجي اميرونه بين
- Village
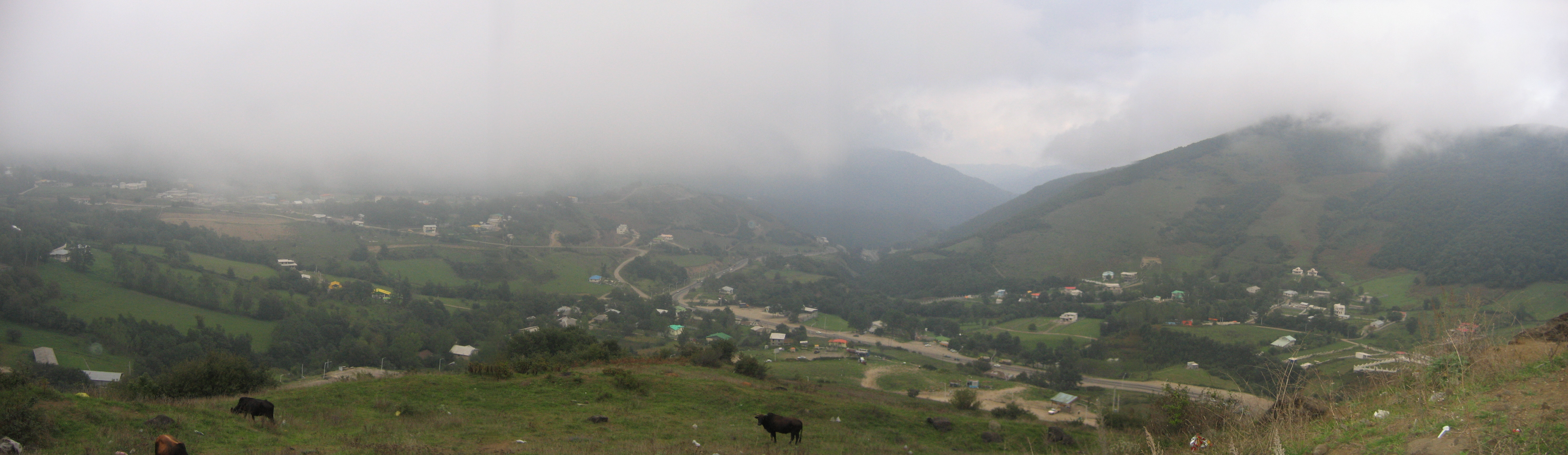

- Location within Iran
- Coordinates: 38°25′32″N 48°35′19″E
- Country: Iran
- Province: Gilan
- County: Astara
- District: Central
- Rural District: Heyran

Population (2016)
  - Total: 233
- Time zone: UTC+3:30 (IRST)

Hajji Amir-e Vanehbin (Persian: حاجي اميرونه بين) (Note: Also romanized as Ḩājī Āmīr-e Vanehbīn and Ḩājjī Āmīr-e Vanehbīn; formerly known as Hajj Amir-e Vanehbin (حاج اميرونه بين), also romanized as Ḩāj Āmīr-e Vanehbīn and Ḩājj Āmīr-e Vanehbīn; also known as Vaneh Bīn) is a village in Heyran Rural District of the Central District in Astara County, Gilan province, Iran.

== Demographics ==
=== Language ===
People of this village are originally Talish but they speak Azerbaijani.

=== Population ===
At the time of the 2006 National Census, the village's population, as Hajj Amir-e Vanehbin, was 194 in 58 households. The following census in 2011 counted 131 people in 39 households, by which time the village was listed as Hajji Amir-e Vanehbin. The 2016 census measured the population of the village as 233 people in 72 households.
