= Khan Hayati =

Village in Gilan province, Iran

Khan Hayati Persian: خان حياطي
- Village
- Location within Iran
- Coordinates: 38°17′18″N 48°51′12″E
- Country: Iran
- Province: Gilan
- County: Astara
- District: Lavandevil
- Rural District: Chelevand

Population (2016)
  - Total: 319
- Time zone: UTC+3:30 (IRST)

Khan Hayati (Persian: خان حياطي) (Note: Also romanized as Khān Ḩayāţī) is a village in Chelevand Rural District of Lavandevil District in Astara County, Gilan province, Iran.

== Demographics ==
=== Language ===
Linguistic composition of the village.

Khan Hayati linguistic composition
language	percent
Azerbaijani	70%
Talysh	30%

=== Population ===
At the time of the 2006 National Census, the village's population was 340 in 82 households. The following census in 2011 counted 344 people in 87 households. The 2016 census measured the population of the village as 319 people in 98 households.
