= Giladeh =

Village in Gilan province, Iran

Giladeh Persian: گيلاده
- Village
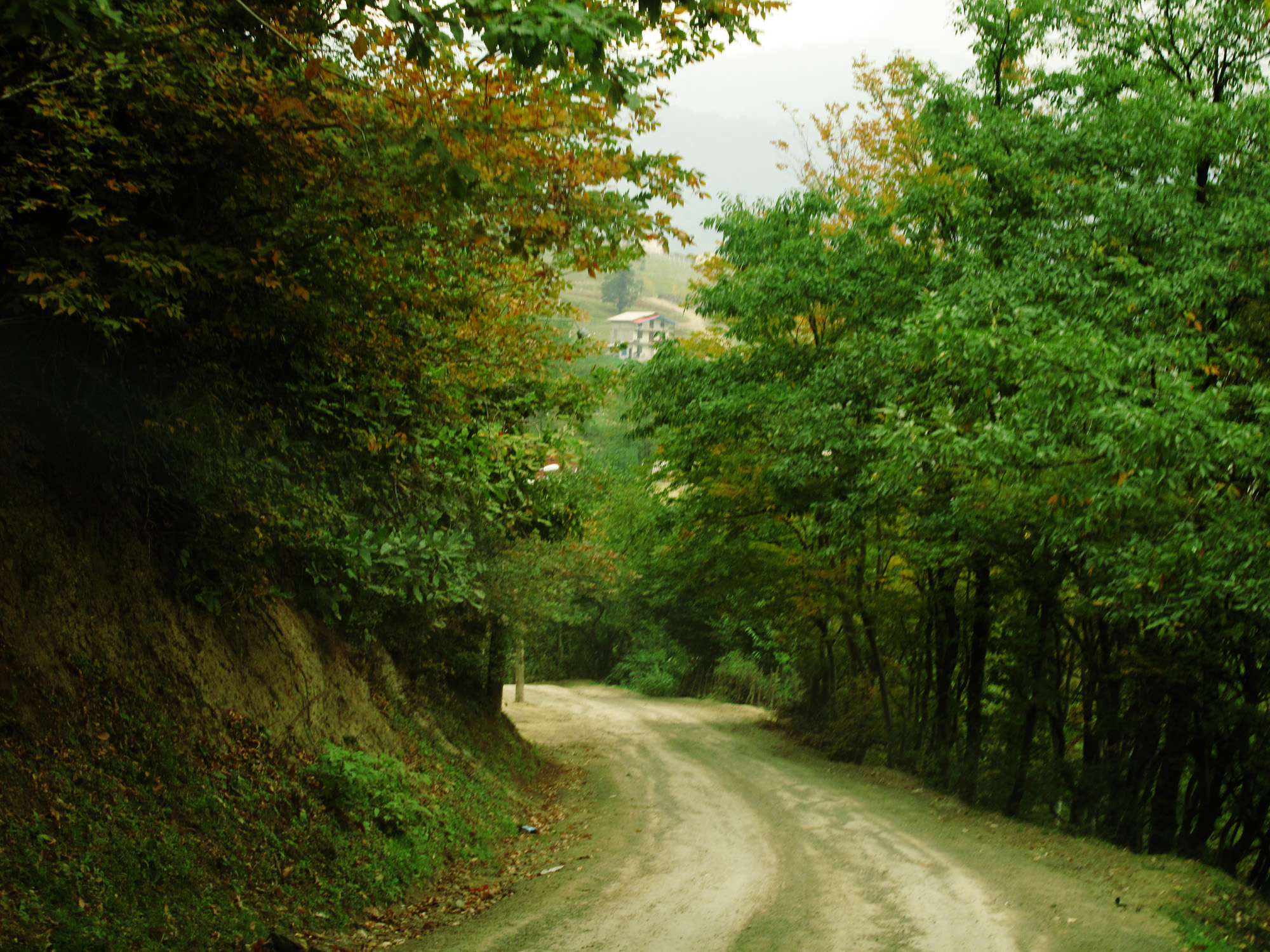

- Location within Iran
- Coordinates: 38°23′12″N 48°38′58″E
- Country: Iran
- Province: Gilan
- County: Astara
- District: Central
- Rural District: Heyran

Population (2016)
  - Total: 416
- Time zone: UTC+3:30 (IRST)

Giladeh (Persian: گيلاده) (Note: Also romanized as Gīlā Deh; also known as Gilledekh) is a village in, and the capital of, Heyran Rural District in the Central District of Astara County, Gilan province, Iran.

== Demographics ==
=== Population ===
At the time of the 2006 National Census, the village's population was 545 in 124 households. The following census in 2011 counted 437 people in 115 households. The 2016 census measured the population of the village as 416 people in 132 households.
