= Bijarabin, Astara =

Village in Gilan province, Iran

Bijarabin Persian: بيجاربين
- Village
- Location within Iran
- Coordinates: 38°25′48″N 48°49′53″E
- Country: Iran
- Province: Gilan
- County: Astara
- District: Central
- Rural District: Virmuni

Population (2016)
  - Total: 722
- Time zone: UTC+3:30 (IRST)

Bijarabin (Persian: بيجاربين) (Note: Also romanized as Bījārābīn; also known as Bījārehbīn) is a village in Virmuni Rural District of the Central District in Astara County, Gilan province, Iran.

== Demographics ==
=== Population ===
At the time of the 2006 National Census, the village's population was 1,052 in 275 households. The following census in 2011 counted 768 people in 209 households. The 2016 census measured the population of the village as 722 people in 222 households.
