= Sheykh Mahalleh =

Sheykh Mahalleh or Shaikh Mahalleh (Persian: شيخ محله) may refer to:

== Gilan Province ==
- Sheykh Mahalleh, Astara
- Sheykh Mahalleh, Rezvanshahr
- Sheykh Mahalleh, Shaft
- Sheykh Mahalleh, Sowme'eh Sara
- Sheykh Mahalleh, Talesh

== Mazandaran Province ==
- Sheykh Mahalleh, Amol
- Sheykh Mahalleh, Babol
- Sheykh Mahalleh, Behshahr
