= Chamlar =

Village in Gilan province, Iran

Chamlar Persian: چملر
- Village
- Location within Iran
- Coordinates: 38°21′49″N 48°37′49″E
- Country: Iran
- Province: Gilan
- County: Astara
- District: Central
- Rural District: Heyran

Population (2016)
  - Total: 182
- Time zone: UTC+3:30 (IRST)

Chamlar (Persian: چملر) is a village in Heyran Rural District of the Central District in Astara County, Gilan province, Iran.

== Demographics ==
=== Population ===
At the time of the 2006 National Census, the village's population was 209 in 48 households. The following census in 2011 counted 190 people in 51 households. The 2016 census measured the population of the village as 182 people in 58 households.
