= Baghcheh Sara =

Village in Gilan province, Iran

Baghcheh Sara Persian: باغچه سرا
- Village
- Location within Iran
- Coordinates: 38°26′44″N 48°50′24″E
- Country: Iran
- Province: Gilan
- County: Astara
- District: Central
- Rural District: Virmuni

Population (2016)
  - Total: 1,567
- Time zone: UTC+3:30 (IRST)

Baghcheh Sara (Persian: باغچه سرا) (Note: Also romanized as Bāghcheh Sarā; also known as Bāghcheh Sarāi) is a village in Virmuni Rural District of the Central District in Astara County, Gilan province, Iran.

== Demographics ==
=== Language ===
Linguistic composition of the village.

Bagcheh Sara linguistic composition
language	percent
Azerbaijani	100%

=== Population ===
At the time of the 2006 National Census, the village's population was 1,805 in 479 households. The following census in 2011 counted 1,727 people in 520 households. The 2016 census measured the population of the village as 1,567 people in 515 households.
