= Dagerman Keshi =

Village in Gilan province, Iran

Dagerman Keshi Persian: دگرمانكشي
- Village
- Location within Iran
- Coordinates: 38°22′37″N 48°37′13″E
- Country: Iran
- Province: Gilan
- County: Astara
- District: Central
- Rural District: Heyran

Population (2016)
  - Total: 110
- Time zone: UTC+3:30 (IRST)

Dagerman Keshi (Persian: دگرمانكشي) (Note: Also romanized as Degermān Keshī; also known as Degermān Kesh) is a village in Heyran Rural District of the Central District in Astara County, Gilan province, Iran.

== Demographics ==
=== Language ===
Linguistic composition of the village.

Dagerman Keshi linguistic composition
language	percent
Azerbaijani	100%

=== Population ===
At the time of the 2006 National Census, the village's population was 183 in 44 households. The following census in 2011 counted 145 people in 39 households. The 2016 census measured the population of the village as 110 people in 39 households.
