= Shaghola =

Coordinates: 38.3833°N 48.6833°E

Shaghola شاغلا
- Village
- Interactive map of Shaghola
- Country: Iran
- Province: Gilan
- County: Astara
- Bakhsh: Central
- Rural District: Heyran

Population (2006)
  - Total: 46
- Time zone: UTC+3:30 (IRST)

Shaghola (Persian: شاغلا, also Romanized as Shāgholā) is a village in Heyran Rural District, in the Central District of Astara County, Gilan Province, Iran. At the 2016 census, its population was 13, in 6 families. Decreased from 46 people in 2006.

== Language ==
Linguistic composition of the village.

Shaghola linguistic composition
language	percent
Azerbaijani	90%
Talysh	10%
