= Mieh Kumeh =

Village in Gilan province, Iran

Mieh Kumeh Persian: ميه كومي
- Village
- Location within Iran
- Country: Iran
- Province: Gilan
- County: Astara
- District: Lavandevil
- Rural District: Chelevand

Population (2016)
  - Total: 103
- Time zone: UTC+3:30 (IRST)

Mieh Kumeh (Persian: ميه كومي) (Note: Also romanized as Mīeh Kūmeh) is a village in Chelevand Rural District of Lavandevil District in Astara County, Gilan province, Iran.

== Demographics ==
=== Language ===
Linguistic composition of the village.

Mieh Kumeh linguistic composition
language	percent
Azerbaijani	60%
Talysh	40%

=== Population ===
At the time of the 2006 National Census, the village's population was 243 in 57 households. The following census in 2011 counted 101 people in 26 households. The 2016 census measured the population of the village as 103 people in 36 households.
