= Anbaran Mahalleh =

Village in Gilan province, Iran

Anbaran Mahalleh Persian: عنبران محله
- Village
- Location within Iran
- Coordinates: 38°26′24″N 48°48′33″E
- Country: Iran
- Province: Gilan
- County: Astara
- District: Central
- Rural District: Virmuni

Population (2016)
  - Total: 2,088
- Time zone: UTC+3:30 (IRST)

Anbaran Mahalleh (Persian: عنبران محله) (Note: Also romanized as ‘Anbarān Maḩalleh; also known as Qal‘eh-ye Owlīā) is a village in Virmuni Rural District of the Central District in Astara County, Gilan province, Iran.

== Demographics ==
=== Language ===
Linguistic composition of the village.

Anbaran Mahalleh linguistic composition
language	percent
Azerbaijani	80%
Talysh	20%

=== Population ===
At the time of the 2006 National Census, the village's population was 1,291 in 285 households. The following census in 2011 counted 1,855 people in 486 households. The 2016 census measured the population of the village as 2,088 people in 639 households.
