= Jebrail Mahalleh =

Village in Gilan province, Iran

Jebrail Mahalleh Persian: جبرئيل محله
- Village
- Location within Iran
- Coordinates: 38°25′20″N 48°48′26″E
- Country: Iran
- Province: Gilan
- County: Astara
- District: Central
- Rural District: Virmuni

Population (2016)
  - Total: 635
- Time zone: UTC+3:30 (IRST)

Jebrail Mahalleh (Persian: جبرئيل محله) (Note: Also romanized as Jebra’īl Maḩalleh) is a village in Virmuni Rural District of the Central District in Astara County, Gilan province, Iran.

== Demographics ==
=== Language ===
Linguistic composition of the village.

Jebrail Mahalleh linguistic composition
language	percent
Talysh	55%
Azerbaijani	45%

=== Population ===
At the time of the 2006 National Census, the village's population was 112 in 24 households. The following census in 2011 counted 750 people in 198 households. The 2016 census measured the population of the village as 635 people in 192 households.
