= Gudi Ewlar =

Coordinates: 38.3833°N 48.6833°E

Gudi Ewlar گودي اولر
- Village
- Interactive map of Gudi Ewlar
- Country: Iran
- Province: Gilan
- County: Astara
- Bakhsh: Central
- Rural District: Heyran

Population (2016)
  - Total: 17
- Time zone: UTC+3:30 (IRST)

Gudi Ewlar (Persian: گودي اولر, also Romanized as Gūdī Owlar) is a village in Heyran Rural District, in the Central District of Astara County, Gilan Province, Iran. At the 2016 census, its population was 17, in 5 families. Down from 20 in 2006.

== Language ==
Linguistic composition of the village.

Gudi Ewlar linguistic composition
language	percent
Azerbaijani	80%
Talysh	20%
