= Sayyadlar =

Village in Gilan province, Iran

Sayyadlar Persian: صيادلر
- Village
- Location within Iran
- Coordinates: 38°24′52″N 48°44′56″E
- Country: Iran
- Province: Gilan
- County: Astara
- District: Central
- Rural District: Heyran

Population (2016)
  - Total: 275
- Time zone: UTC+3:30 (IRST)

Sayyadlar (Persian: صيادلر) (Note: Also romanized as Şayyādlar; also known as Şayyādlar-e Khānbolāghī) is a village in Heyran Rural District of the Central District in Astara County, Gilan province, Iran.

== Demographics ==
=== Language ===
Linguistic composition of the village.

Sayyadlar linguistic composition
language	percent
Talysh	100%

=== Population ===
At the time of the 2006 National Census, the village's population was 318 in 64 households. The following census in 2011 counted 202 people in 53 households. The 2016 census measured the population of the village as 275 people in 83 households.
