= Damir Ughlikesh =

Village in Gilan province, Iran

Damir Ughlikesh Persian: دميراوغلي كش
- Village
- Location within Iran
- Coordinates: 38°24′08″N 48°43′12″E
- Country: Iran
- Province: Gilan
- County: Astara
- District: Central
- Rural District: Heyran

Population (2016)
  - Total: 237
- Time zone: UTC+3:30 (IRST)

Damir Ughlikesh (Persian: دميراوغلي كش) (Note: Also romanized as Damīr Ūghlīkesh) is a village in Heyran Rural District of the Central District in Astara County, Gilan province, Iran.

== Demographics ==
=== Population ===
At the time of the 2006 National Census, the village's population was 222 in 51 households. The following census in 2011 counted 206 people in 57 households. The 2016 census measured the population of the village as 237 people in 75 households.
