= Hulestun =

Hulestun هولستون
- Village
- Location within Iran
- Coordinates: 38°22′08″N 48°41′36″E
- Country: Iran
- Province: Gilan
- County: Astara
- Bakhsh: Central
- Rural District: Heyran

Population (2016)
  - Total: 53
- Time zone: UTC+3:30 (IRST)

Hulestun (Persian: هولستون, also Romanized as Hūlestūn) is a village in Heyran Rural District, in the Central District of Astara County, Gilan Province, Iran. At the 2016 census, its population was 53, in 16 families. Down from 59 in 2006.
