= Khosrow Mahalleh =

Village in Gilan province, Iran

Khosrow Mahalleh Persian: خسرومحله
- Village
- Location within Iran
- Coordinates: 38°18′41″N 48°50′37″E
- Country: Iran
- Province: Gilan
- County: Astara
- District: Lavandevil
- Rural District: Lavandevil

Population (2016)
  - Total: 764
- Time zone: UTC+3:30 (IRST)

Khosrow Mahalleh (Persian: خسرومحله) (Note: Also romanized as Khosrow Maḩalleh; also known as Mollā Aḩmad) is a village in Lavandevil Rural District of Lavandevil District in Astara County, Gilan province, Iran.

== Demographics ==
=== Language ===
Linguistic composition of the village.

Khosrow Mahalleh linguistic composition
language	percent
Azerbaijani	80%
Talysh	20%

=== Population ===
At the time of the 2006 National Census, the village's population was 547 in 129 households. The following census in 2011 counted 654 people in 187 households. The 2016 census measured the population of the village as 764 people in 235 households.
