= Qanbar Mahalleh, Astara =

Village in Gilan province, Iran

Qanbar Mahalleh Persian: قنبرمحله
- Village
- Location within Iran
- Coordinates: 38°19′29″N 48°50′35″E
- Country: Iran
- Province: Gilan
- County: Astara
- District: Lavandevil
- Rural District: Lavandevil

Population (2016)
  - Total: 605
- Time zone: UTC+3:30 (IRST)

Qanbar Mahalleh (Persian: قنبرمحله) (Note: Also romanized as Qanbar Maḩalleh; also known as Qanbarī Maḩalleh and Qanbarī Maḩalleh-ye Sībelī) is a village in Lavandevil Rural District of Lavandevil District in Astara County, Gilan province, Iran.

== Demographics ==
=== Language ===
Linguistic composition of the village.

Qanbar Mahalleh linguistic composition
language	percent
Azerbaijani	70%
Talysh	30%

=== Population ===
At the time of the 2006 National Census, the village's population was 644 in 149 households. The following census in 2011 counted 670 people in 189 households. The 2016 census measured the population of the village as 605 people in 180 households.
