= Fandoq Poshteh =

Fandoq Poshteh فندق پشته
- Village
- Location within Iran
- Coordinates: 38°22′30″N 48°37′11″E
- Country: Iran
- Province: Gilan
- County: Astara
- Bakhsh: Central
- Rural District: Heyran

Population (2006)
  - Total: 25
- Time zone: UTC+3:30 (IRST)

Fandoq Poshteh (Persian: فندق پشته; also known as Fandūq Poshteh) is a village in Heyran Rural District, in the Central District of Astara County, Gilan Province, Iran. At the 2016 census, its population was 25, in 6 families. Up from 23 in 2006.

== Language ==
Linguistic composition of the village.

Fandoq Poshteh linguistic composition
language	percent
Azerbaijani	60%
Talysh	40%
