= Siraliveh =

Village in Gilan province, Iran

Siraliveh Persian: سيراليوه
- Village
- Location within Iran
- Coordinates: 38°19′03″N 48°50′17″E
- Country: Iran
- Province: Gilan
- County: Astara
- District: Lavandevil
- Rural District: Lavandevil

Population (2016)
  - Total: 517
- Time zone: UTC+3:30 (IRST)

Siraliveh (Persian: سيراليوه) (Note: Also romanized as Sīr‘ālīveh and Sīrālīveh; formerly known as Seraliveh (سراليوه), also romanized as Serālīveh; also known as Sirolive and Sīr‘ālīvar) is a village in Lavandevil Rural District of Lavandevil District in Astara County, Gilan province, Iran.

== Demographics ==
=== Language ===
Linguistic composition of the village.

Seraliveh linguistic composition
language	percent
Talysh	70%
Azerbaijani	30%

=== Population ===
At the time of the 2006 National Census, the village's population, as Seraliveh, was 484 in 115 households. The following census in 2011 counted 558 people in 155 households, by which time the village was listed as Siraliveh. The 2016 census measured the population of the village as 517 people in 173 households.
