= Chelavand =

Village in Gilan province, Iran

Chelavand Persian: چلوند
- Village
- Location within Iran
- Coordinates: 38°17′08″N 48°51′28″E
- Country: Iran
- Province: Gilan
- County: Astara
- District: Lavandevil
- Rural District: Chelevand

Population (2016)
  - Total: 981
- Time zone: UTC+3:30 (IRST)

Chelavand (Persian: چلوند) (Note: Also romanized as Chelvand; also known as Bālā Maḩalleh-ye Chelvand, Chelvand-e Bālā, and Chīlīvand) is a village in, and the capital of, Chelevand Rural District in Lavandevil District of Astara County, Gilan province, Iran.

== Demographics ==
=== Language ===
Linguistic composition of the village.

Chelavand linguistic composition
language	percent
Talysh	60%
Azerbaijani	40%

=== Population ===
At the time of the 2006 National Census, the village's population was 903 in 201 households. The following census in 2011 counted 941 people in 247 households. The 2016 census measured the population of the village as 981 people in 317 households.
