= Khoshk Dahaneh =

Village in Gilan province, Iran

Khoshk Dahaneh Persian: خشك دهنه
- Village
- Location within Iran
- Coordinates: 38°26′49″N 48°51′01″E
- Country: Iran
- Province: Gilan
- County: Astara
- District: Central
- Rural District: Virmuni

Population (2016)
  - Total: 1,680
- Time zone: UTC+3:30 (IRST)

Khoshk Dahaneh (Persian: خشك دهنه) (Note: Also known as Khoshgeh Dahaneh, Khoshkeh Dahaneh, and Khūshkdāneh) is a village in Virmuni Rural District of the Central District in Astara County, Gilan province, Iran.

== Demographics ==
=== Language ===
Linguistic composition of the village.

Khosh Dahaneh linguistic composition
language	percent
Talysh	80%
Persian	20%

=== Population ===
At the time of the 2006 National Census, the village's population was 1,124 in 279 households. The following census in 2011 counted 1,338 people in 392 households. The 2016 census measured the population of the village as 1,680 people in 519 households.
