= Bash Mahalleh-ye Lavandevil =

Village in Gilan province, Iran

Bash Mahalleh-ye Lavandevil Persian: باش محله لوندويل
- Village
- Location within Iran
- Coordinates: 38°18′18″N 48°50′28″E
- Country: Iran
- Province: Gilan
- County: Astara
- District: Lavandevil
- Rural District: Chelevand

Population (2016)
  - Total: 1,296
- Time zone: UTC+3:30 (IRST)

Bash Mahalleh-ye Lavandevil (Persian: باش محله لوندويل) (Note: Also romanized as Bāsh Maḩalleh-ye Lavandevīl; also known as Bāsh Maḩalleh) is a village in Chelevand Rural District of Lavandevil District in Astara County, Gilan province, Iran.

== Demographics ==
=== Language ===
Linguistic composition of the village.

Bash Mahalleh-ye Lavandevil linguistic composition
language	percent
Talysh	90%
Azerbaijani	10%

=== Population ===
At the time of the 2006 National Census, the village's population was 1,299 in 298 households. The following census in 2011 counted 1,369 people in 352 households. The 2016 census measured the population of the village as 1,296 people in 377 households.
