= Moshend, Iran =

Village in Gilan province, Iran

Moshend Persian: مشند
- Village
- Location within Iran
- Coordinates: 38°23′11″N 48°41′19″E
- Country: Iran
- Province: Gilan
- County: Astara
- District: Central
- Rural District: Heyran

Population (2016)
  - Total: 518
- Time zone: UTC+3:30 (IRST)

Moshend (Persian: مشند) is a village in Heyran Rural District of the Central District in Astara County, Gilan province, Iran.

== Demographics ==
=== Language ===
Linguistic composition of the village.

Moshend linguistic composition
| language | percent |
| Talysh | 100% |

=== Population ===
At the time of the 2006 National Census, the village's population was 624 in 117 households. The following census in 2011 noted the population had dipped to 520 people in 128 households. The 2016 census measured the population of the village as 518 people in 168 households. It was the most populous village in its rural district.
