= Sibli =

Village in Gilan province, Iran

Sibli Persian: سيبلي
- Village
- Location within Iran
- Coordinates: 38°20′06″N 48°51′50″E
- Country: Iran
- Province: Gilan
- County: Astara
- District: Lavandevil
- Rural District: Lavandevil

Population (2016)
  - Total: 1,649
- Time zone: UTC+3:30 (IRST)

Sibli (Persian: سيبلي) (Note: Also romanized as Sībelī) is a village in Lavandevil Rural District of Lavandevil District in Astara County, Gilan province, Iran.

== Demographics ==
=== Language ===
Linguistic composition of the village.

Sibli linguistic composition
language	percent
Azerbaijani	40%
Kurmanji	30%
Talysh	20%
Persian	10%

=== Population ===
At the time of the 2006 National Census, the village's population was 1,264 in 282 households. The following census in 2011 counted 1,689 people in 483 households. The 2016 census measured the population of the village as 1,649 people in 507 households.
