= Nazar Mahalleh =

Village in Gilan province, Iran

Nazar Mahalleh Persian: نظرمحله
- Village
- Location within Iran
- Country: Iran
- Province: Gilan
- County: Astara
- District: Lavandevil
- Rural District: Chelevand

Population (2016)
  - Total: 24
- Time zone: UTC+3:30 (IRST)

Nazar Mahalleh (Persian: نظرمحله) (Note: Also romanized as Naz̧ar Maḩalleh) is a village in Chelevand Rural District of Lavandevil District in Astara County, Gilan province, Iran.

== Demographics ==
=== Language ===
Linguistic composition of the village.

Nazar Mahalleh linguistic composition
| language | percent |
| Talysh | 80% |
| Azerbaijani | 20% |

=== Population ===
At the time of the 2006 National Census, the village's population was 26 in five households. The following census in 2011 counted 30 people in eight households. The 2016 census measured the population of the village as 24 people in nine households.
