= Shapour Marhaba =

Iranian politician

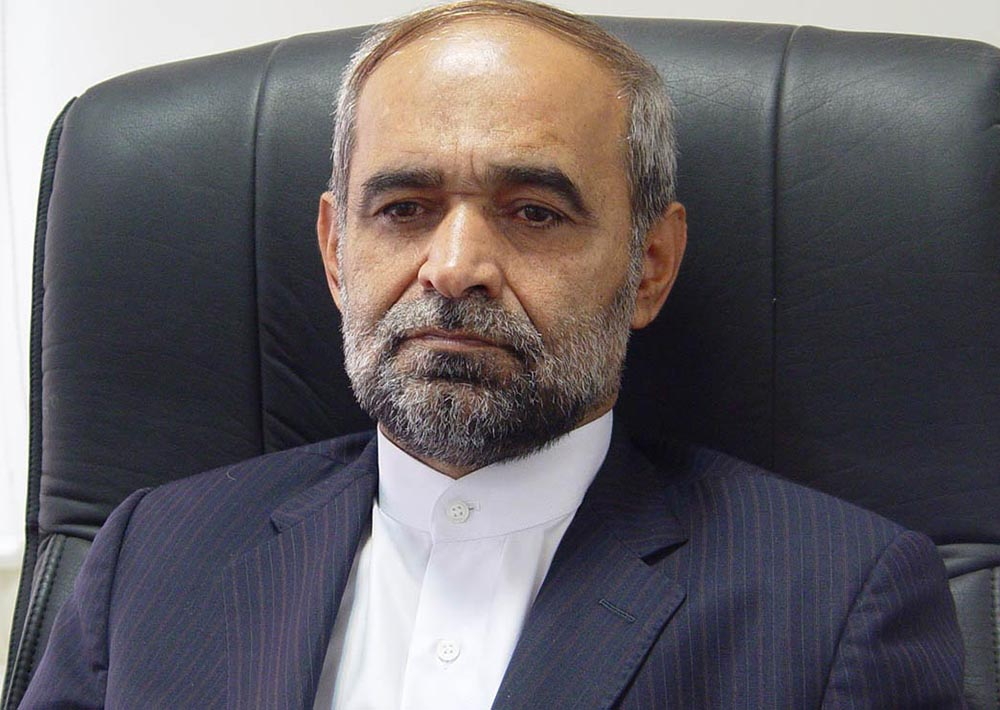

Member of Islamic Consultative Assembly
- In office 27 May 1992 – 26 May 1996
- Preceded by: Mohammad Farzpour Machiani
- Constituency: Astara
- Majority: 12,272 votes (44.4%)
- In office 23 February 1997 – 26 May 2000
- Succeeded by: Hassan Zahmatkesh
- Constituency: Astara
- Majority: 15,124 votes (59.9%)
- In office 27 May 2004 – 26 May 2008
- Preceded by: Hassan Zahmatkesh
- Succeeded by: Farhad Dalghpoush
- Constituency: Astara
- Majority: 22,984 votes (51.77%)

Member of board of directors of Targeting Subsidies Organization
- In office 22 October 2014 – 7 June 2015
- President: Hassan Rouhani
- Vice President: Mohammad Bagher Nobakht

Member of board of directors & Treasurer Islamic Consultative Assembly Former Members Association

Personal details
- Born: 1957 (age 68–69) Virmuni, Astara, Iran
- Party: Principlist
- Profession: Politician
- Website: Official Website

Military service
- Allegiance: Iran
- Branch/service: IRGC Ground Forces
- Years of service: 1979–1984
- Unit: IRGC branch of Astara
- Battles/wars: Iran–Iraq War; Urban warfare with Mujahedin

Shapour Marhaba (Persian: شاپور مرحبا; born 1957) is an Iranian politician. Marhaba was elected from the Astara electoral district to the 4th, 5th (By-election) and 7th Iranian legislative elections.

== Biography ==
Shapour Marhaba's brother Yosuf Marhaba was assassinated by the Mujahedin on 22 August 1981 while he was prosecutor of Astara. After this Shapour was also targeted in an assassination plot on 29 August 1981 when he was a key member of Astara's IRGC, but he survived. Marhaba was then elected three times to represent the city.

Marhaba was:

- President of the Iran–Georgia Friendship Group,
- President of the Iran–Bulgaria Friendship Group,
- Vice President of the Iran–Azerbaijan Friendship Group, and
- Vice President of the Iran–Romania Friendship Group in the Iranian Parliament.

Shapour Marhaba was banned by the Council of Guardians from taking part in the 2012 and 2016 Iranian legislative elections.

== Electoral history ==
Year	Election	Votes	%	Rank	Notes
1984	2nd term of Parliament	?	?	?	Went to Run-off
1984	2nd term of Parliament Run-off	?	?	2nd	Lost
1992	4th term of Parliament	▲12,272	▲44.4	1st	Won
1996-97	5th term of Parliament	Annulment of Election			
1996-97	5th term of Parliament By-election	▲15,124	▲59.9	1st	Won
2000	6th term of Parliament	?	▼ ?	2nd	Lost
2004	7th term of Parliament	▲22,984	▲51.77	1st	Won
2008	8th term of Parliament	▼13,462	▼31.02	2nd	Lost
2012	9th term of Parliament	–			Disquilified
2016	10th term of Parliament	–			Disquilified

== Books ==
1. Report to the honorable people of Astara
2. Plan of Astara Free Trade – Industrial Zone
3. Astara port: Survey of social, cultural and economic situation
4. 3rd workbook of Shapour Marhaba: Report of three years activity at the 7th Iranian parliament
5. Interior Policy and Foreign Policy of Azerbaijan Republic during the presidency of Heydar Aliyev

== Notes ==
Assembly seats
Preceded by Mohammad Farzpour Machiani	ICA Representative from Astara; 1992 – 1996	Vacant until By-election Title next held by Himself
Vacant Annulment of Election Title last held by Himself	ICA Representative from Astara; 1997 – 2000	Succeeded by Hassan Zahmatkesh
Preceded by Hassan Zahmatkesh	ICA Representative from Astara; 2004 – 2008	Succeeded by Farhad Dalghpoush
