= Baharestan, Gilan =

Village in Gilan province, Iran

Baharestan Persian: بهارستان
- Village
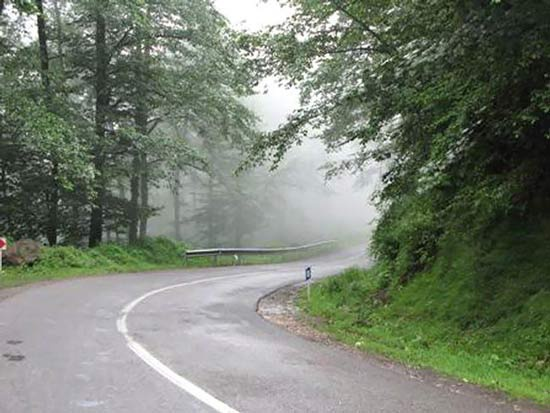
- Landscape in the village of Baharestan

- Location within Iran
- Coordinates: 38°23′36″N 48°41′33″E
- Country: Iran
- Province: Gilan
- County: Astara
- District: Central
- Rural District: Heyran

Population (2016)
  - Total: 103
- Time zone: UTC+3:30 (IRST)

Baharestan (Persian: بهارستان) (Note: Also romanized as Bahārestān; also known as Bahiristān, Baḩrestān, and Khārestān) is a village in Heyran Rural District of the Central District in Astara County, Gilan province, Iran.

== Demographics ==
=== Population ===
At the time of the 2006 National Census, the village's population was 82 in 15 households. The following census in 2011 counted 120 people in 24 households. The 2016 census measured the population of the village as 103 people in 31 households.
