= Chelavand-e Pain =

Village in Gilan province, Iran

Chelavand-e Pain Persian: چلوندپائين
- Village
- Location within Iran
- Coordinates: 38°17′47″N 48°52′27″E
- Country: Iran
- Province: Gilan
- County: Astara
- District: Lavandevil
- Rural District: Chelevand

Population (2016)
  - Total: 149
- Time zone: UTC+3:30 (IRST)

Chelavand-e Pain (Persian: چلوندپائين) (Note: Also romanized as Chelevand-e Pā’īn and Chelvand-e Pā’īn) is a village in Chelevand Rural District of Lavandevil District in Astara County, Gilan province, Iran.

== Demographics ==
=== Language ===
Linguistic composition of the village.

Chelavand-e Pain linguistic composition
language	percent
Azerbaijani	60%
Talysh	40%

=== Population ===
At the time of the 2006 National Census, the village's population was 975 in 204 households. The following census in 2011 counted 141 people in 39 households. The 2016 census measured the population of the village as 149 people in 43 households.
