= Gunesh =

Village in Gilan province, Iran

Gunesh Persian: گونش
- Village
- Location within Iran
- Coordinates: 38°16′24″N 48°45′29″E
- Country: Iran
- Province: Gilan
- County: Astara
- District: Lavandevil
- Rural District: Chelevand

Population (2016)
  - Total: 14
- Time zone: UTC+3:30 (IRST)

Gunesh (Persian: گونش) (Note: Also romanized as Gūnesh) is a village in Chelevand Rural District of Lavandevil District in Astara County, Gilan province, Iran.

== Demographics ==
=== Population ===
At the time of the 2006 National Census, the village's population was 38 in eight households. The following census in 2011 counted a population below the reporting threshold. The 2016 census measured the population of the village as 14 people in five households.
