= Kanrud, Gilan =

Village in Gilan province, Iran

Kanrud Persian: كانرود
- Village
- Location within Iran
- Coordinates: 38°20′45″N 48°50′34″E
- Country: Iran
- Province: Gilan
- County: Astara
- District: Lavandevil
- Rural District: Lavandevil

Population (2016)
  - Total: 2,640
- Time zone: UTC+3:30 (IRST)

Kanrud (Persian: كانرود) (Note: Also romanized as Kānrūd; also known as Ganrud) is a village in Lavandevil Rural District of Lavandevil District in Astara County, Gilan province, Iran.

== Demographics ==
=== Language ===
Linguistic composition of the village.

Kanrud linguistic composition
language	percent
Azerbaijani	80%
Talysh	20%

=== Population ===
At the time of the 2006 National Census, the village's population was 2,618 in 620 households. The following census in 2011 counted 2,691 people in 716 households. The 2016 census measured the population of the village as 2,640 people in 762 households. It was the most populous village in its rural district.

== Tourism ==
Imamzadeh Ebrahim and qassim shrine thats are Musa al-Kadhim sons is in this village. the old shrine is replace in few years ago
