= Soli, Iran =

Village in Gilan province, Iran

Soli Persian: سلي
- Village
- Location within Iran
- Country: Iran
- Province: Gilan
- County: Astara
- District: Lavandevil
- Rural District: Chelevand

Population (2016)
  - Total: Below reporting threshold
- Time zone: UTC+3:30 (IRST)

Soli (Persian: سلي) (Note: Also romanized as Solī) is a village in Chelevand Rural District of Lavandevil District in Astara County, Gilan province, Iran.

== Demographics ==
=== Population ===
At the time of the 2006 National Census, the village's population was 30 in six households. The following census in 2011 counted 19 people in four households. The 2016 census measured the population of the village as below the reporting threshold.
