= Sheykh Mahalleh, Astara =

Sheykh Mahalleh شيخ محله
- Village
- Interactive map of Sheykh Mahalleh
- Coordinates: 38.437°N 48.812°E
- Country: Iran
- Province: Gilan
- County: Astara
- Bakhsh: Central
- Rural District: Virmuni

Population (2016)
  - Total: 265
- Time zone: UTC+3:30 (IRST)

Sheykh Mahalleh (Persian: شيخ محله, also Romanized as Sheykh Maḩalleh) is a village in Virmuni Rural District, in the Central District of Astara County, Gilan Province, Iran.

At the time of the 2006 National Census, the village's population was 873. The following census in 2011 counted 260 people in 64 households. The 2016 census measured the population of the village as 265 people in 76 households.

== Language ==
Linguistic composition of the village.

Sheykh Mahalleh linguistic composition
language	percent
Talysh	100%
