= Zereh Zhieh =

Zereh Zhieh زره ژيه
- Village
- Interactive map of Zereh Zhieh
- Coordinates: 38°21′56″N 48°41′20″E
- Country: Iran
- Province: Gilan
- County: Astara
- Bakhsh: Central
- Rural District: Heyran

Population (2016)
  - Total: 33
- Time zone: UTC+3:30 (IRST)

Zereh Zhieh (Persian: زره ژيه, also romanized as Zarreh Zhīeh) is a village in Heyran Rural District, in the Central District of Astara County, Gilan Province, Iran. At the 2016 census, its population was 33, in 11 families.

== Language ==
Linguistic composition of the village.

Zereh Zhieh linguistic composition
language	percent
Azerbaijani	80%
Talysh	20%
