= Baskam Chal =

Coordinates: 38.4000°N 48.6167°E

Baskam Chal باسكم چال
- Village
- Interactive map of Baskam Chal
- Country: Iran
- Province: Gilan
- County: Astara
- Bakhsh: Central
- Rural District: Heyran

Population (2016)
  - Total: 10
- Time zone: UTC+3:30 (IRST)

Baskam Chal (Persian: باسكم چال, also Romanized as Bāskam Chāl) is a village in Heyran Rural District, in the Central District of Astara County, Gilan Province, Iran. At the 2016 census, its population was 10, in 4 families. Decreased from 22 people in 2006.
