= Qareh Su, Gilan =

Village in Gilan province, Iran

Qareh Su Persian: قره سو
- Village
- Location within Iran
- Coordinates: 38°16′59″N 48°52′28″E
- Country: Iran
- Province: Gilan
- County: Astara
- District: Lavandevil
- Rural District: Chelevand

Population (2016)
  - Total: 1,537
- Time zone: UTC+3:30 (IRST)

Qareh Su (Persian: قره سو) (Note: Also romanized as Qarah Sū and Qareh Sū; formerly known as Qarah Suy (قره سوي), also romanized as Qarah Sūy) is a village in Chelevand Rural District of Lavandevil District in Astara County, Gilan province, in Iran.

== Demographics ==
=== Language ===
The language spoken in Qareh Su is Talysh language.

=== Population ===
At the time of the 2006 National Census, the village's population, as Qarah Suy, was 1,524 in 351 households. The following census in 2011 counted 1,882 people in 501 households, by which time the village was listed as Qareh Su. The 2016 census measured the population of the village as 1,537 people in 468 households. It was the most populous village in its rural district.
