= Aq Masjed =

Aq Masjed (Persian: اق مسجد) may refer to:

- Aq Masjed, Ardabil
- Aq Masjed, Astara, Gilan Province
- Aq Masjed, Rezvanshahr, Gilan Province
