= Sij, Gilan =

Village in Gilan province, Iran

Sij Persian: سيج
- Village
- Location within Iran
- Coordinates: 38°23′30″N 48°37′58″E
- Country: Iran
- Province: Gilan
- County: Astara
- District: Central
- Rural District: Heyran

Population (2016)
  - Total: 156
- Time zone: UTC+3:30 (IRST)

Sij (Persian: سيج) (Note: Also romanized as Sīj) is a village in Heyran Rural District of the Central District in Astara County, Gilan province, Iran.

== Demographics ==
=== Language ===
Linguistic composition of the village.

Sij linguistic composition
language	percent
Talysh	60%
Azerbaijani	40%

=== Population ===
At the time of the 2006 National Census, the village's population was 171 in 34 households. The following census in 2011 counted 147 people in 41 households. The 2016 census measured the population of the village as 156 people in 49 households.
