= Khalileh Sara, Astara =

Village in Gilan province, Iran

Khalileh Sara Persian: خليله سرا
- Village
- Location within Iran
- Coordinates: 38°17′48″N 48°51′19″E
- Country: Iran
- Province: Gilan
- County: Astara
- District: Lavandevil
- Rural District: Chelevand

Population (2016)
  - Total: 351
- Time zone: UTC+3:30 (IRST)

Khalileh Sara (Persian: خليله سرا) (Note: Also romanized as Khalīleh Sarā) is a village in Chelevand Rural District of Lavandevil District in Astara County, Gilan province, Iran.

== Demographics ==
=== Language ===
Linguistic composition of the village.

Khalileh Sara linguistic composition
language	percent
Azerbaijani	60%
Talysh	40%

=== Population ===
At the time of the 2006 National Census, the village's population was 287 in 64 households. The following census in 2011 counted 300 people in 81 households. The 2016 census measured the population of the village as 351 people in 102 households.
