= Sij =

Sij or SIJ may refer to:

- Sacroiliac joint
- Special Immigrant Juvenile Status
- Sij, Gilan, a village in Iran
- Sij, Razavi Khorasan, a village in Iran
- Sij, South Khorasan, a village in Iran
