= Virmuni =

Village in Gilan province, Iran

Virmuni Persian: ويرموني
- Village
- Location within Iran
- Coordinates: 38°24′50″N 48°49′52″E
- Country: Iran
- Province: Gilan
- County: Astara
- District: Central
- Rural District: Virmuni

Population (2016)
  - Total: 2,440
- Time zone: UTC+3:30 (IRST)

Virmuni (Persian: ويرموني) (Note: Also romanized as Vīrmūnī; also known as Wermani) is a village in, and the capital of, Virmuni Rural District in the Central District of Astara County, Gilan province, Iran.

== Demographics ==
=== Language ===
Linguistic composition of the village.

Virmuni linguistic composition
language	percent
Azerbaijani	90%
Talysh	10%

=== Population ===
At the time of the 2006 National Census, the village's population was 2,151 in 612 households. The following census in 2011 counted 2,319 people in 697 households. The 2016 census measured the population of the village as 2,440 people in 758 households. It was the most populous village in its rural district.
