= Heyran-e Olya =

Heyran-e Olya (Persian: حيران عليا) may refer to:

- Heyran-e Olya, East Azerbaijan
- Heyran-e Olya, Gilan
