= Heyran-e Olya, East Azerbaijan =

Heyran-e Olya حيران عليا
- village
- Location within Iran
- Coordinates: 37°46′35″N 48°58′00″E
- Country: Iran
- Province: Gilan
- County: Astsra

Population (2006)
  - Total: 85
- Time zone: UTC+3:30 (IRST)

Heyran-e Olya (Persian: حيران عليا, also Romanized as Ḩeyrān-e ‘Olyā; also known as Ḩeyrān ‘Alī Shāmlū) is a village in Astara, in the Gilan Province, Iran. At the 2006 census, its population was 85, in 14 families.
