= Aq Masjed, Astara =

Aq Masjed آق مسجد
- Village
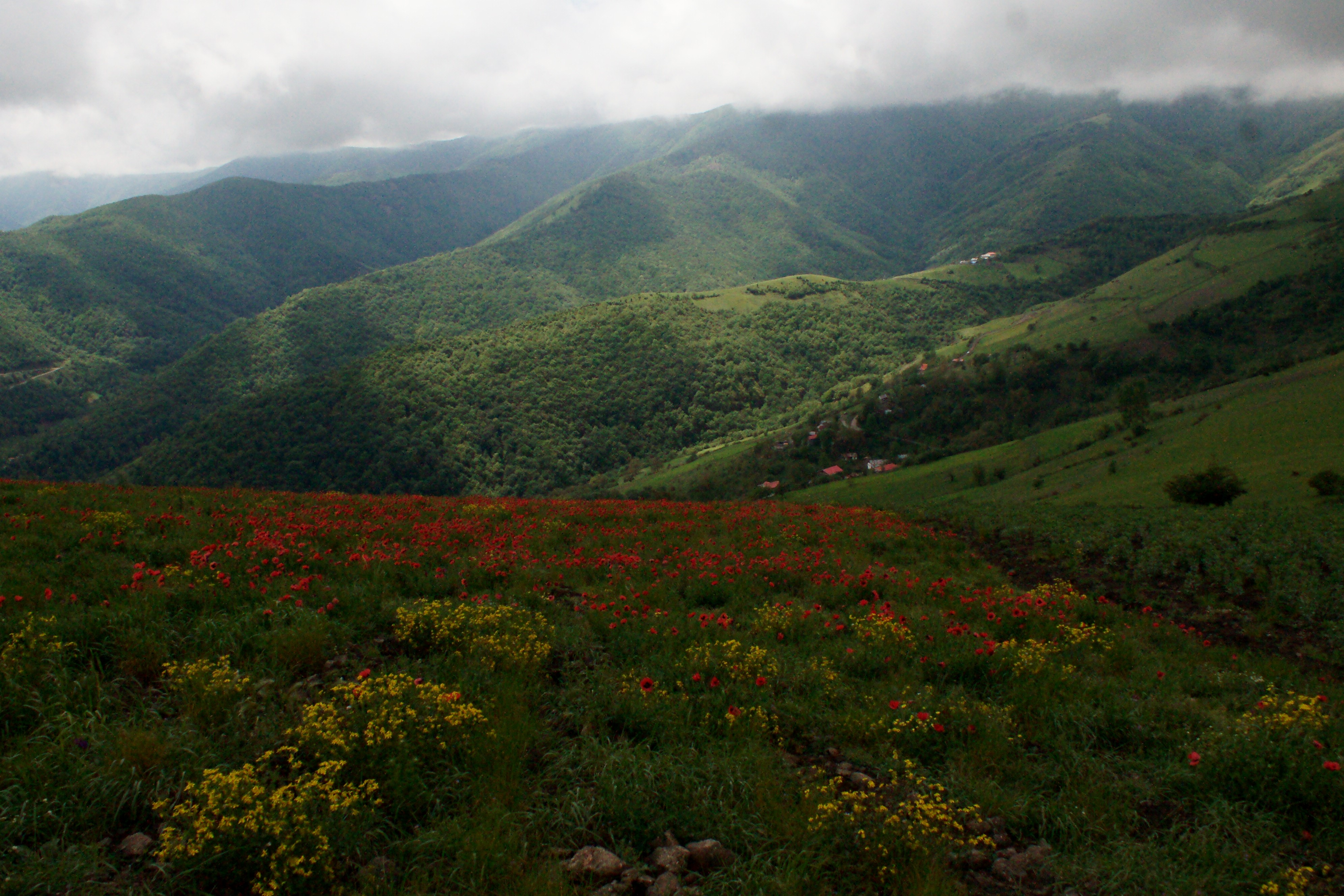

- Location within Iran
- Coordinates: 38°22′59″N 48°36′35″E
- Country: Iran
- Province: Gilan
- County: Astara
- Bakhsh: Central
- Rural District: Heyran

Population (2006)
  - Total: 78
- Time zone: UTC+3:30 (IRST)

Aq Masjed (Persian: آق مسجد, also romanized as Āq Masjed) is a village in Heyran Rural District, in the Central District of Astara County, Gilan Province, Iran. At the 2016 census, its population was 55, in 19 families. Down from 78 people in 2006.
