= Vali Dadashi =

Iranian politician and academic

- ولی داداشی
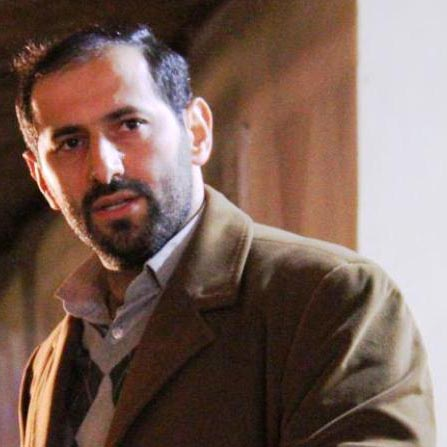

Member of the Islamic Consultative Assembly
- Incumbent
- Assumed office 27 May 2024
- Constituency: Astara
- In office 28 May 2016 – 26 May 2020
- Preceded by: Safar Naeimi
- Constituency: Astara
- Majority: 14,173 (28%)

Personal details
- Born: 30 March 1981 (age 45) Astara, Iran
- Party: Independent politician
- Spouse: Married
- Education: Qom Hawza; Shahid Beheshti University
- Website: validadashi.com

Vali Dadashi (Persian: ‌‌ولی داداشی) known as Hamed Dadashi (Persian: ‌‌حامد داداشی; born 1981 in Astara, Gilan ) is an Iranian politician and academic.

He is the current member of Iranian Parliament representing Astara district since 2024. He was also a member of the tenth Islamic Consultative Assembly from the electorate of Astara from 2016 to 2020. Dadashi won with 14,173 (28%) votes.

Assembly seats
Preceded by Safar Naeimi	Islamic Consultative Assembly Representative from Astara; 2016 – 2020	Succeeded by Gholamreza Marhaba
