= Khalileh Sara =

Khalileh Sara (Persian: خليله سرا) may refer to:

- Khalileh Sara, Astara
- Khalileh Sara, Talesh
