= Heyran-e Vosta =

Heyran-e Vosta حيران وسطی
- Village
- Location within Iran
- Coordinates: 38°24′00″N 48°36′00″E
- Country: Iran
- Province: Gilan
- County: Astara
- Bakhsh: Central
- Rural District: Heyran

Population (2016)
  - Total: 84
- Time zone: UTC+3:30 (IRST)

Heyran-e Vosta (Persian: حيران وسطی, also Romanized as Ḩeyrān-e Vosţá; also known as Ḩeyrān-e Mīānī) is a village in Heyran Rural District, in the Central District of Astara County, Gilan Province, Iran. At the 2016 census, its population was 84, in 23 families. Up from 65 in 2006.

== Language ==
Linguistic composition of the village.

Heyran-e Vosta linguistic composition
language	percent
Azerbaijani	100%
