= Lavandevil Rural District =

Rural district in Gilan province, Iran

Lavandevil Rural District Persian: دهستان لوندویل
- Rural District
- Location within Iran
- Coordinates: 38°19′N 48°47′E
- Country: Iran
- Province: Gilan
- County: Astara
- District: Lavandevil
- Established: 1987
- Capital: Lavandevil

Population (2016)
  - Total: 6,209
- Time zone: UTC+3:30 (IRST)

Lavandevil Rural District (Persian: دهستان لوندویل) is in Lavandevil District of Astara County, Gilan province, Iran. It is administered from the city of Lavandevil.

== Demographics ==
=== Population ===
At the time of the 2006 National Census, the rural district's population was 6,796 in 1,581 households. There were 6,328 inhabitants in 1,741 households at the following census of 2011. The 2016 census measured the population of the rural district as 6,209 in 1,869 households. The most populous of its 13 villages was Kanrud, with 2,640 residents.

=== Other villages in the rural district ===
- Dileh
- Khosrow Mahalleh
- Qanbar Mahalleh
- Sibli
- Siraliveh
