= Chelevand Rural District =

Rural district in Gilan province, Iran

Chelevand Rural District Persian: دهستان چلوند
- Rural District
- Location within Iran
- Coordinates: 38°17′N 48°47′E
- Country: Iran
- Province: Gilan
- County: Astara
- District: Lavandevil
- Established: 2002
- Capital: Chelavand

Population (2016)
  - Total: 5,370
- Time zone: UTC+3:30 (IRST)

Chelevand Rural District (Persian: دهستان چلوند) is in Lavandevil District of Astara County, Gilan province, Iran. Its capital is the village of Chelavand.

== Demographics ==
=== Population ===
At the time of the 2006 National Census, the rural district's population was 7,553 in 1,735 households. There were 5,743 inhabitants in 1,515 households at the following census of 2011. The 2016 census measured the population of the rural district as 5,370 in 1,635 households. The most populous of its 17 villages was Qareh Su, with 1,537 people.

=== Other villages in the rural district ===
- Bash Mahalleh-ye Lavandevil
- Chelavand-e Pain
- Gunesh
- Khalileh Sara
- Khan Hayati
- Kuteh Kumeh
- Mieh Kumeh
- Nazar Mahalleh
- Soli
