= Payan Rafat =

Iranian footballer

Personal information
- Date of birth: September 9, 1970 (age 56)
- Place of birth: Astara, Iran
- Height: 1.91 m (6 ft 3 in)
- Position: Centre forward

Team information
- Current team: Shahrdari Astara F.C.

Youth career
- Asnaf Astara

Senior career*
Years	Team	Apps	(Gls)
1993–1999	Malavan	200	(14)
1999–2001	Persepolis	36	(10)
2001–2002	Hatta Club	8	(9)
2002–2003	Persepolis	20	(5)
2003–2004	Saba Battery	8	(6)
2004–2007	Homa	8	(6)

Managerial career
- 2007–2008: Damash Iranian (assistant)
- 2010–2011: Persepolis U-20
- 2015–2016: Malavan (Assistant coach)
- 2020–2021: Shahrdari Astara F.C.
- * Club domestic league appearances and goals

Payan Rafat (Persian: پایان رأفت, born September 9, 1970, in Astara, Iran) is a retired Iranian footballer and current coach. He served his golden days in Persepolis. His style of play was similar to Iranian football legend Ali Daei. He is considered one of the most memorable players in history of Tehran derby, the rivalry between Persepolis and Esteghlal; as he received a punch from rival goalkeeper Parviz Boroumand in the famous derby played in 2000.

== Club career ==
After playing 6 seasons in Malavan, he joined Persepolis. He later left for a half season at the UAE League's Hatta Club; and returned to Persepolis in 2002.

=== Club career statistics ===
Club performance			League		Cup		Continental		Total	
Season	Club	League	Apps	Goals	Apps	Goals	Apps	Goals	Apps	Goals
Iran			League		Hazfi Cup		Asia		Total	
1998–99	Persepolis	Azadegan League	0	0	3	0	-	-	3	0
1999–00	Persepolis	Azadegan League	19	6	1	0	6	0	27	6
2000–01	Persepolis	Azadegan League	15	4	2	0	7	3	24	7
2001–02	Persepolis	Iran Pro League	2	0	1	0	-	-	3	0
2002–03	Persepolis	Iran Pro League	19	5			2	0		
Career total			55	15			15	3		
