= Heyran Gondola lift =

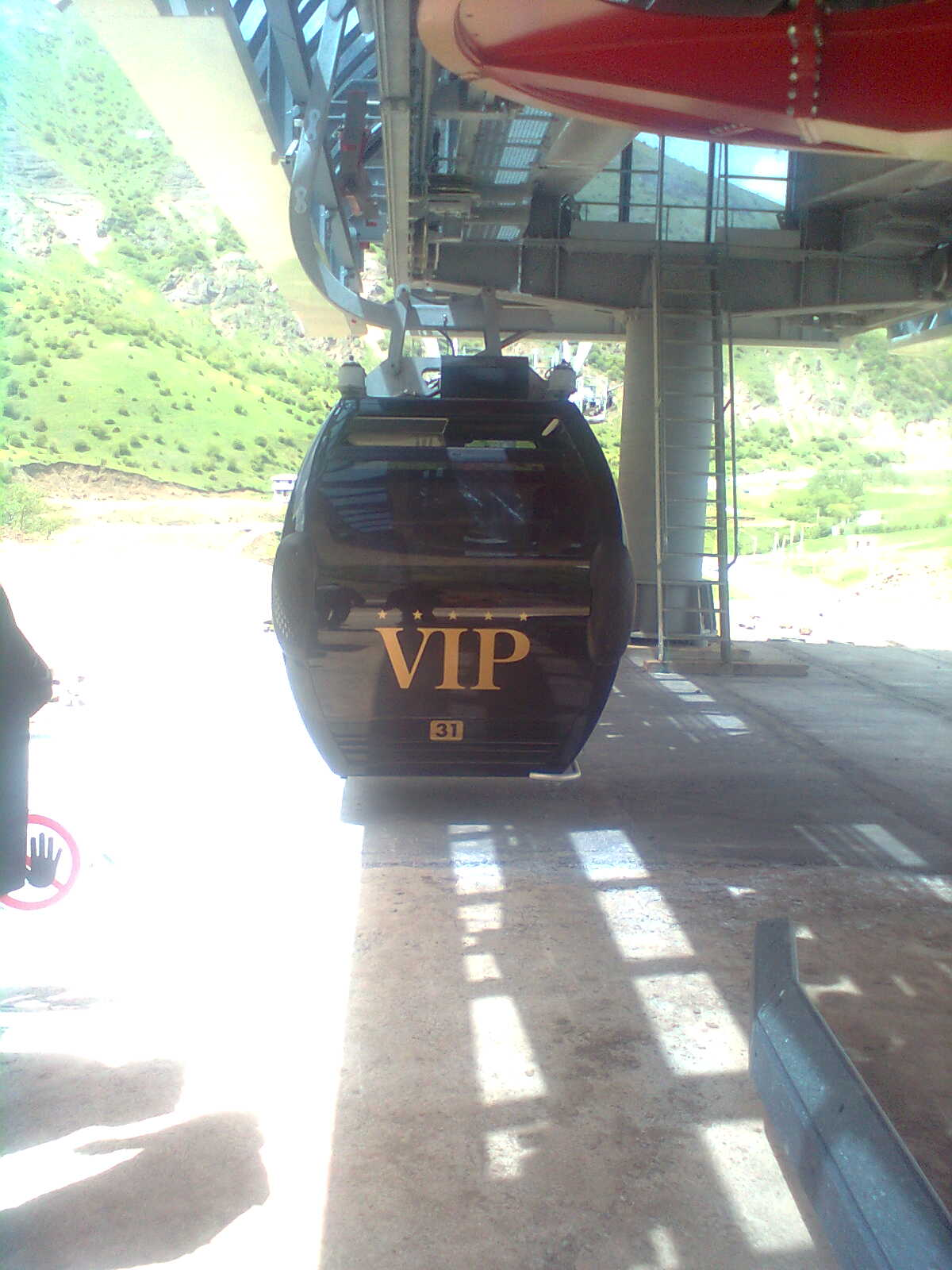
Heyran Gondola lift cabin and structure.

Heyran Gondola lift (Télécabine) (Persian: Telekābine Heyrān Āstārā) is a gondola lift in the Alborz mountain range, within Gilan Province of northwestern Iran.

It is located above the Heyran villages and near the city of Astara, in Astara County.

== Description ==
Construction of Heyran Gondola lift is an important step towards the development of tourism in Gilan Province.

The Heyran Gondola lift has 30 ordinary cabins with six seats and also there are three special VIP cabins.

The gondola lift is 1,500 metres (4,900 ft) long through a beautiful landscape of the Alborz. It has: views east of the Caspian Sea; views southwest to the Fandog Loo forests in the Alborz, and views north to the Azerbaijan border area in the Alborz.

== See also ==
- Heyran village, Astara
- List of gondola lifts
- List of ski areas and resorts in Iran
- Alborz mountain range topics
