= Heyran-e Olya, Gilan =

Village in Gilan province, Iran

Heyran-e Olya Persian: حيران عليا
- Village
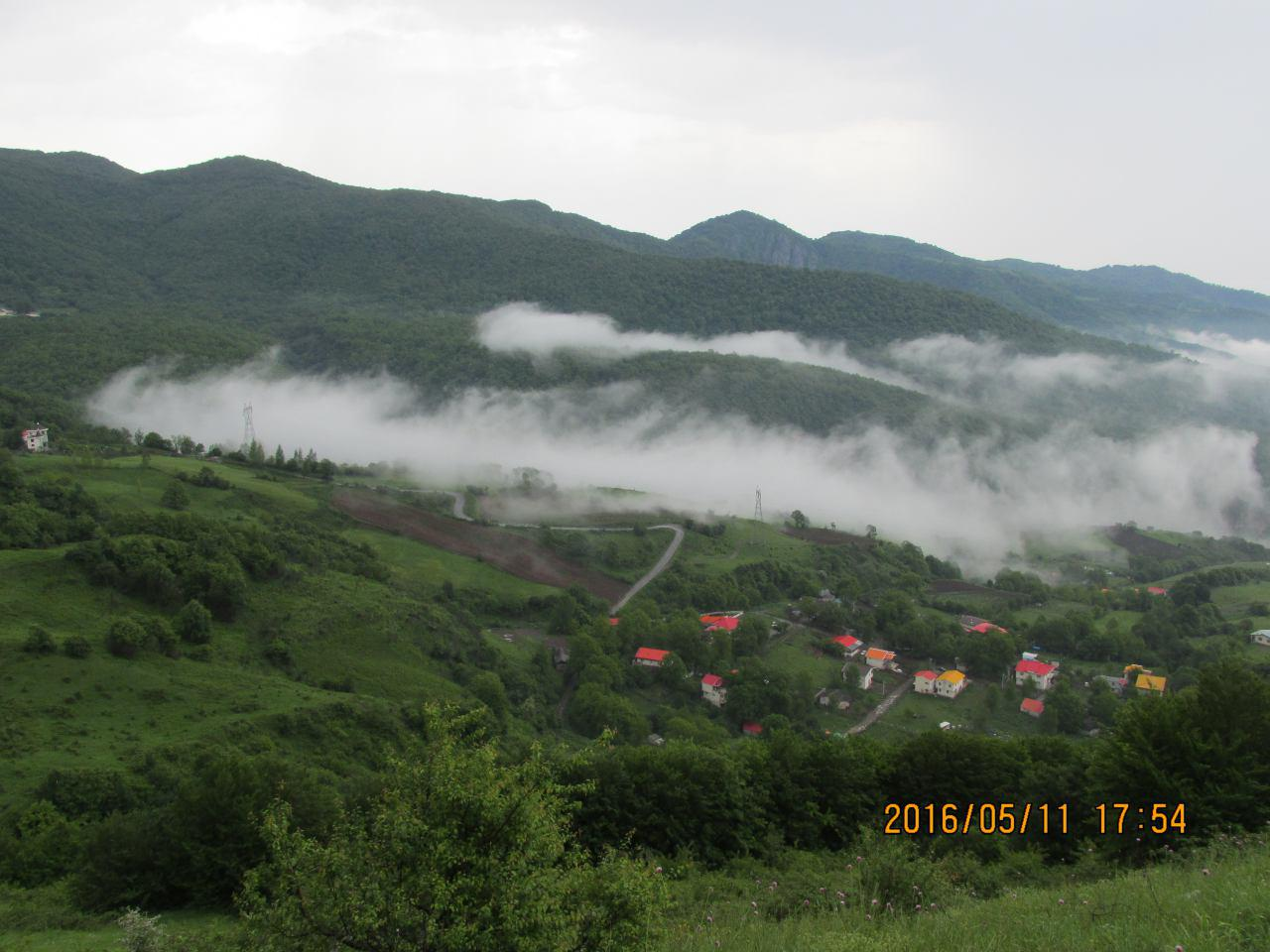
- The village of Heyran-e Olya

- Location within Iran
- Country: Iran
- Province: Gilan
- County: Astara
- District: Central
- Rural District: Heyran

Population (2016)
  - Total: 128
- Time zone: UTC+3:30 (IRST)

Heyran-e Olya (Persian: حيران عليا) (Note: Also romanized as Ḩeyrān-e ‘Olyā; also known as Ḩeyrān-e Bālā) is a village in Heyran Rural District of the Central District in Astara County, Gilan province, Iran.

== Demographics ==
=== Language ===
Linguistic composition of the village.

Heyran-e Olya linguistic composition
language	percent
Azerbaijani	100%

=== Population ===
At the time of the 2006 National Census, the village's population was 108 in 26 households. The following census in 2011 counted 115 people in 31 households. The 2016 census measured the population of the village as 128 people in 43 households.
