= Safar Naeimi =

Iranian politician

- صفر نعیمی

Member of Islamic Consultative Assembly
- In office 28 May 2012 – 28 May 2016
- Preceded by: Farhad Dalghpoush
- Succeeded by: Vali Dadashi
- Constituency: Astara
- Majority: 24,062 (48.93%)

Personal details
- Born: Safar Naeimi Raz; 22 March 1959 (age 67) Raz, Ardabil, Iran
- Party: Followers of Wilayat (2012-16)
- Education: IAUCTB University of Zanjan

Military service
- Allegiance: Iran
- Branch/service: Revolutionary Guards
- Years of service: 1982-2004
- Rank: Colonel
- Battles/wars: Iran–Iraq War

Safar Naeimi Raz (Persian: ‌‌صفر نعیمی رز; born 1959) is an Iranian politician.

Naeimi was born in Raz, Ardabil. He was a member of the 9th Islamic Consultative Assembly from the electorate of Astara. and vice chairman of Iran-Azerbaijan Friendship society. Naeimi won with 24,062 (50.33%) votes.

== Electoral history ==
Year	Election	Votes	%	Rank	Notes
2008	8th term of Parliament	4,493	10.35	4th	Lost
2012	9th term of Parliament	▲24,062	▲48.93	1st	Won
2016	10th term of Parliament	–			Disquilified

Assembly seats
Preceded by Farhad Dalghpoush	Islamic Consultative Assembly Representative from Astara; 2012–2016	Succeeded by Vali Dadashi
