= Heyran-e Sofla =

Heyran-e Sofla حیران سفلی
- Village
- Location within Iran
- Coordinates: 38°24′02″N 48°36′19″E
- Country: Iran
- Province: Gilan
- County: Astara
- Bakhsh: Central
- Rural District: Heyran

Population (2016)
  - Total: 67
- Time zone: UTC+3:30 (IRST)

Heyran-e Sofla (Persian: حيران سفلی, also Romanized as Ḩeyrān-e Soflá; also known as Hairan, Ḩeyrān, and Ḩeyrān-e Pā’īn) is a village in Heyran Rural District, in the Central District of Astara County, Gilan Province, Iran. At the 2016 census, its population was 67, in 25 families. Up from 58 in 2006.

== Language ==
Linguistic composition of the village.

Heyran-e Sofla linguistic composition
language	percent
Azerbaijani	100%
