= Astarachay =

River in Iran and Azerbaijan

Coordinates: 38.442°N 48.882°E

Astarachay Astaraçay, آستاراچای
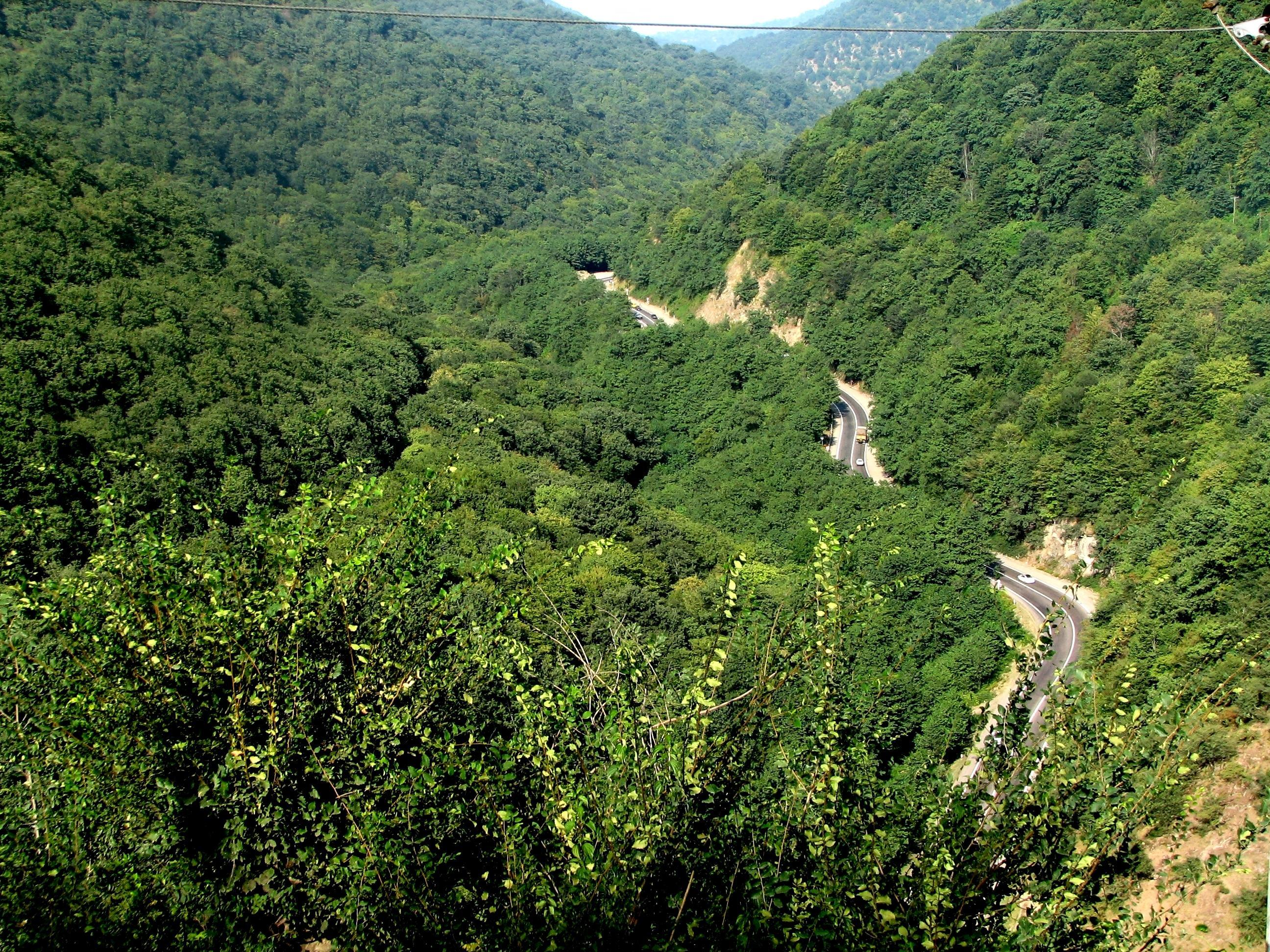

Location
- Countries: Iran and Azerbaijan
- Province: Gilan, Iran
- District: Astara, Azerbaijan
- Cities: Astara, Iran; Astara Azerbaijan

Physical characteristics
- Mouth: Caspian Sea
- Length: 38 km (24 mi)
- Basin size: 242 km^{2} (93 sq mi)

The Astarachay (Talysh: Ostororü, Persian: آستاراچای, Azerbaijani: Astaraçay) is a small river that defines the eastern border between Iran and Azerbaijan in Western Asia.

The river discharges into the Caspian Sea. After flowing in a canyon through the Alborz mountain range, it reaches its mouth on the southwestern Caspian coast.

The Astarachay is partially in Gilan Province of far northwestern Iran.

== See also ==
- Tributaries of the Caspian Sea
- Alborz mountain range topics
