= Laton Waterfall =

Coordinates: 38.321178°N 48.728661°E

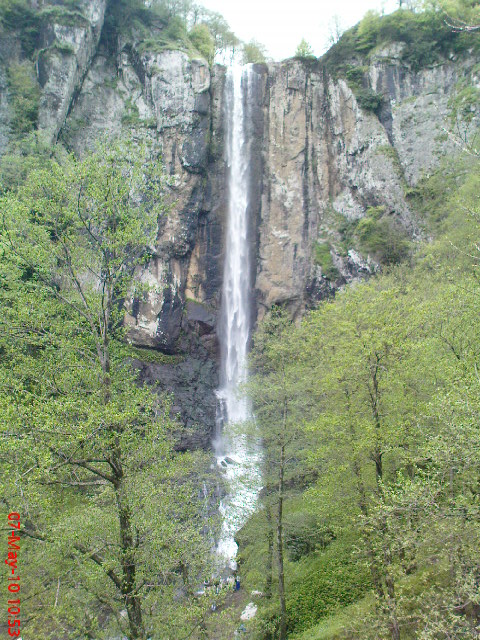
- Laton Waterfall
- Interactive map of Laton Waterfall
- Location: Astara, Iran
- Total height: 105 m (344 ft)
- Watercourse: Spinas Mountain
- World height ranking: Iran (1)

Latun (Barzov) Waterfall is a freefalling waterfall located in the eastern Alborz mountain range and in Lavandavil, Astara County, within Gilan Province of far northwestern Iran.

== Geography ==
The height of the waterfall is 105 metres (344 ft). It is located in the between Hashtpar and the city of Astara on the Caspian Sea.

== Biodiversity ==
On the edge of the waterfall is an old-growth forest in the Gilan region, with pear, peach, quince, walnut, hazelnut, and wild apple trees that remain green for nine months each year.

== Gallery ==
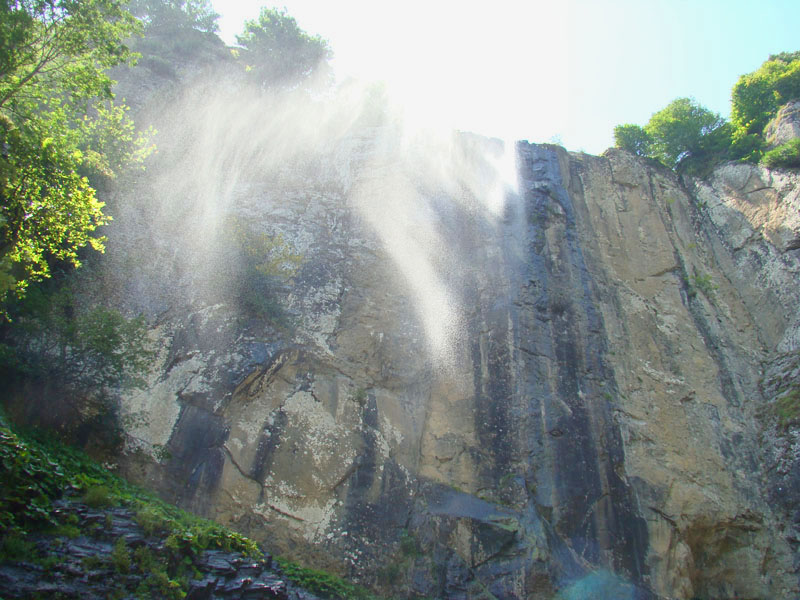
Laton Waterfall

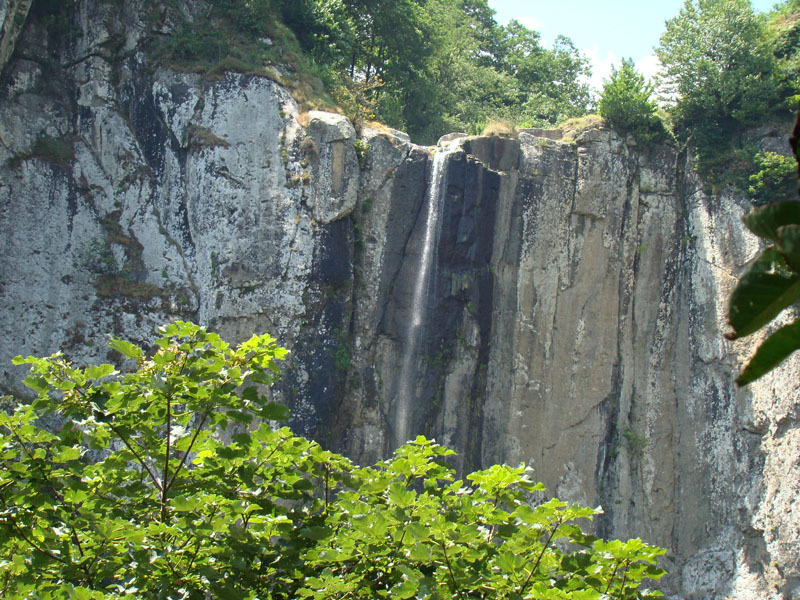
Laton Waterfall

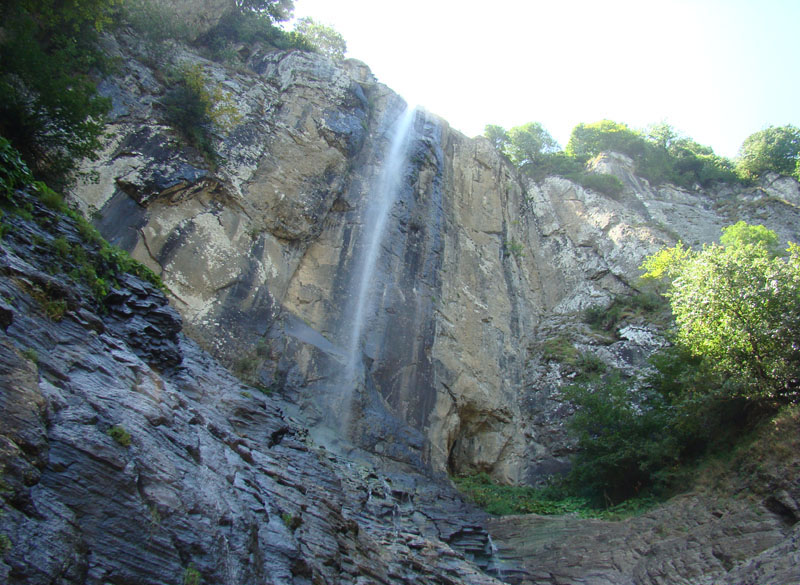
Laton Waterfall

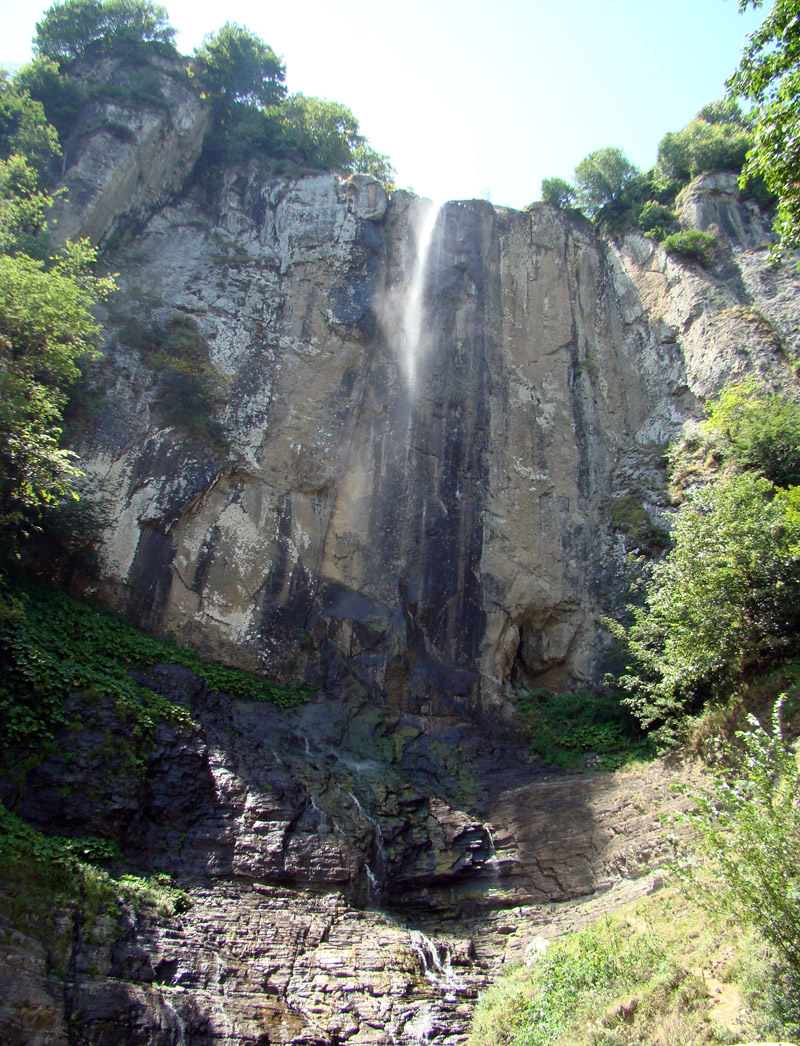
Laton Waterfall

== See also ==
- List of waterfalls
- Astara County topics
- Alborz (Elburz) mountain range topics
