= Sheykh Mahalleh, Babol =

Sheykh Mahalleh شيخ محله
- Village
- Location within Iran
- Coordinates: 36°27′36″N 52°36′00″E
- Country: Iran
- Province: Mazandaran
- County: Babol
- Bakhsh: Central
- Rural District: Esbu Kola

Population (2016)
  - Total: 358
- Time zone: UTC+3:30 (IRST)

Sheykh Mahalleh (Persian: شيخ محله, also Romanized as Sheykh Maḩalleh) is a village in Esbu Kola Rural District, in the Central District of Babol County, Mazandaran Province, Iran.

At the time of the 2006 National Census, the village's population was 281 in 77 households. The following census in 2011 counted 273 people in 90 households. The 2016 census measured the population of the village as 358 people in 126 households.
