= Heyran Rural District =

Rural district in Gilan province, Iran

Heyran Rural District Persian: دهستان حيران
- Rural District
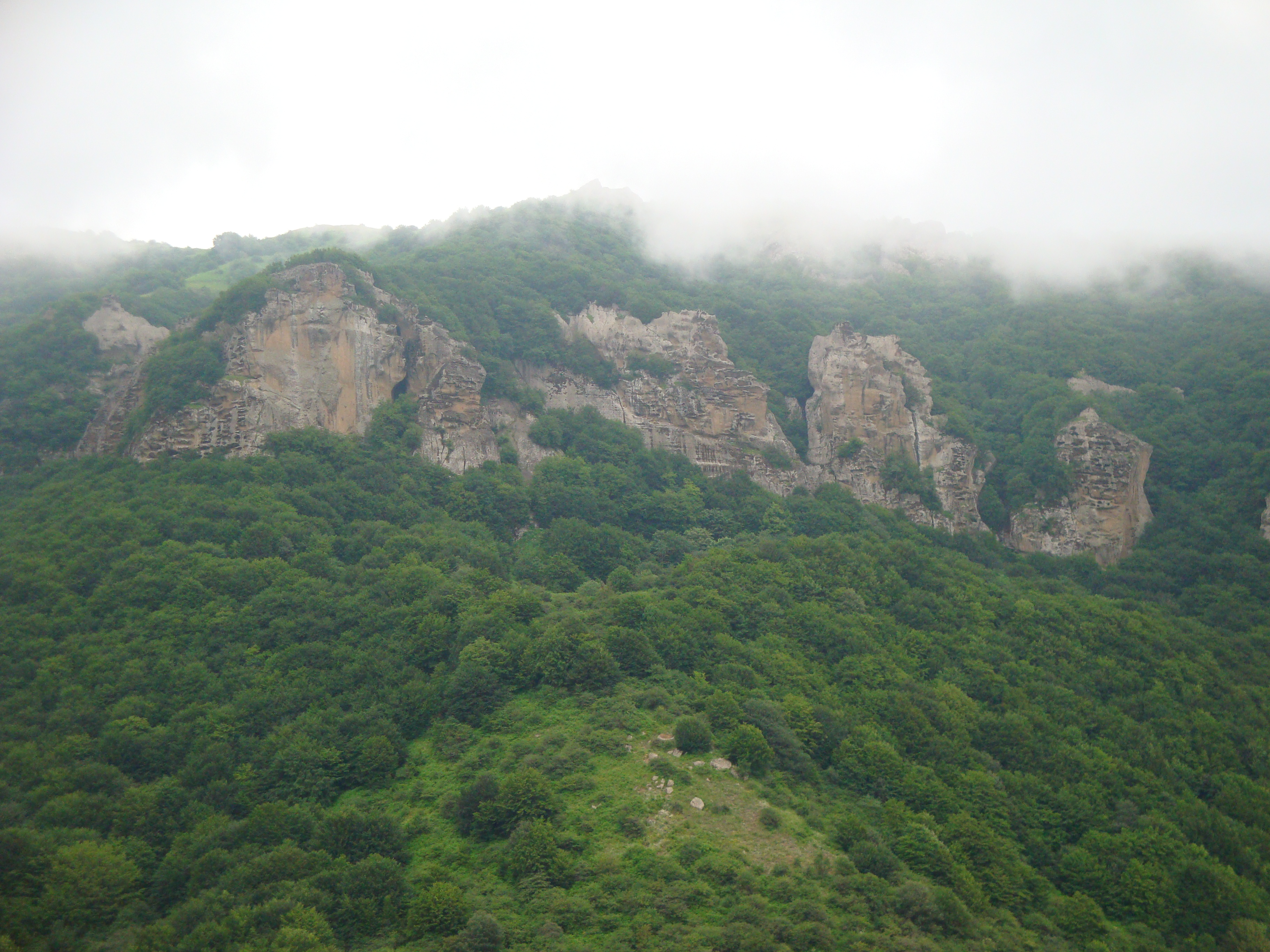

- Location within Iran
- Coordinates: 38°23′N 48°40′E
- Country: Iran
- Province: Gilan
- County: Astara
- District: Central
- Established: 1987
- Capital: Giladeh

Population (2016)
  - Total: 2,718
- Time zone: UTC+3:30 (IRST)

Heyran Rural District (Persian: دهستان حيران) is in the Central District of Astara County, Gilan province, Iran. Its capital is the village of Giladeh.

== Demographics ==
=== Population ===
At the time of the 2006 National Census, the rural district's population was 3,061 in 678 households. There were 2,500 inhabitants in 659 households at the following census of 2011. The 2016 census measured the population of the rural district as 2,718 in 866 households. The most populous of its 24 villages was Moshend, with 518 residents.

=== All villages in the rural district ===
- Aq Masjed
- Baharestan
- Baskam Chal
- Chamlar
- Damir Ughlikesh
- Dagerman Keshi
- Fandoq Poshteh
- Giladeh
- Gudi Ewlar
- Hajj Amir-e Vanehbin
- Heyran-e Olya
- Heyran-e Sofla
- Heyran-e Vosta
- Hulestun
- Mishend
- Sayyadlar
- Shaghola
- Sij
- Zereh Zhieh
