= Astara, Iran =

City in Gilan province, Iran

Astara آستارا
- City
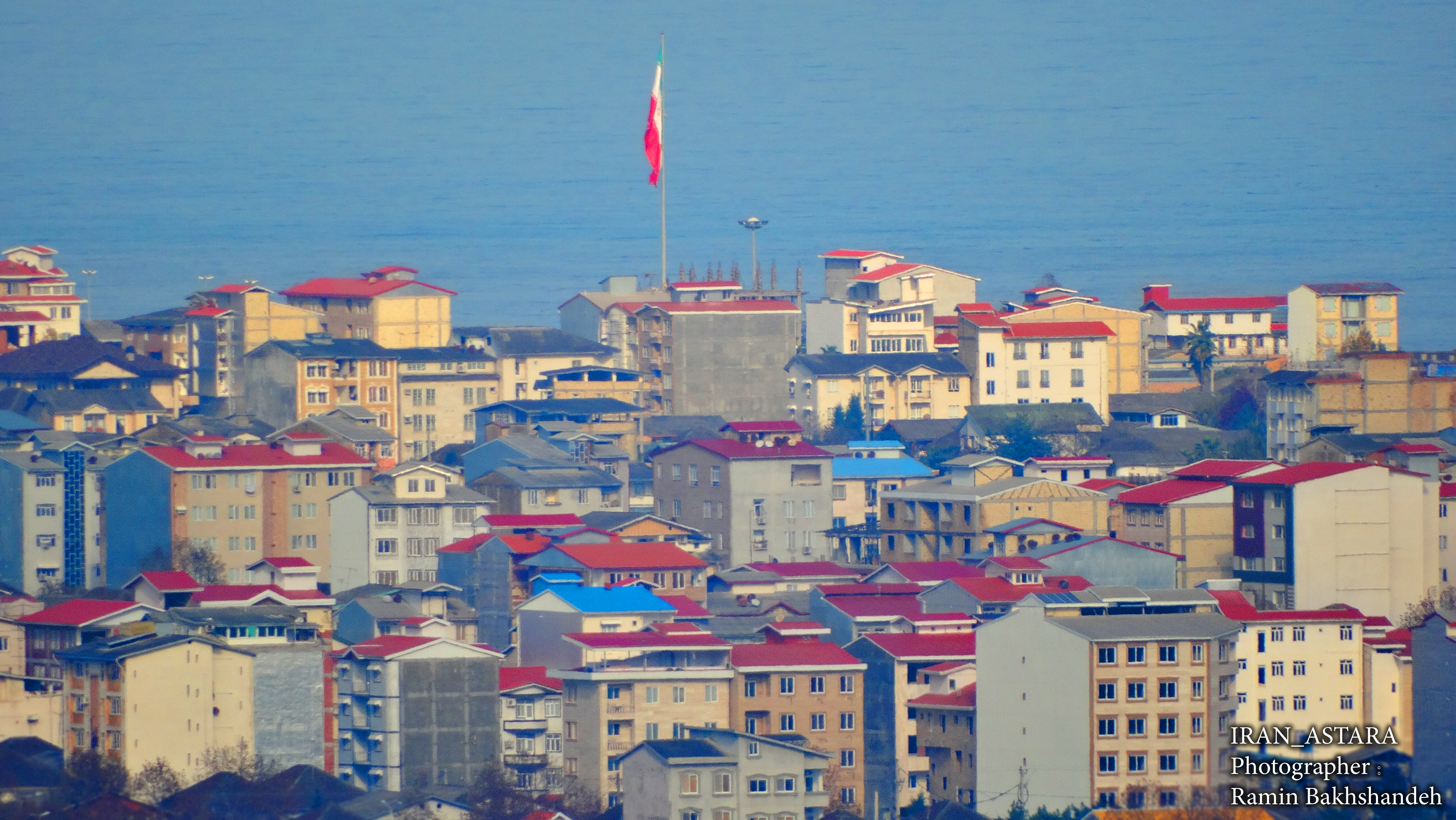
- Skyline of Astara

- Location within Iran
- Coordinates: 38°25′19″N 48°52′09″E
- Country: Iran
- Province: Gilan
- County: Astara
- District: Central

Government
  - Mayor: Meysam Alvanpour

Population (2016)
  - Total: 51,579
- Time zone: UTC+3:30 (IRST)

Astara (Persian: آستارا; pronounced [ɒstaɾɒ]) (Note: Also romanized as Āstārā) is a city in the Central District of Astara County, Gilan province, Iran, serving as the capital of both the county and the district. It lies on the border with the Republic of Azerbaijan and on the Caspian Sea. It is an important border trade center between Iran and the Caucasus Region.

== History ==
The earliest mention, under the name Astārāb, comes in the Ḥodūd al-ʿālam, written toward the end of the 10th century. In the 14th century, Astara became the seat of the small principality of the Esfahbad or Espahbad (-bod) of Gīlān. From the 16th to the 18th centuries, the Ṭālešī Khans of Āstārā were either autonomous or nominally subordinate to the governors of Gīlān or Ardabīl; on several occasions they played an important role in the history of the Caspian provinces. According to Minorsky, we do not know whether the later governors of Astara still continued the line of the Ispahbads. Even after the conquest of Northern Tālish by the Russians (1813) the family of the Tālish-khans retained certain rights.

Astara was part of the short lived Talysh Khanate in the 18th and 19th centuries, and for a short while it was the capital of the Khanate before it was moved to Lankaran. In 1828, with the signing of the Treaty of Turkmenchay, Astara was split into two. The city of Astara in Azerbaijan is located just across the Astarachay River.

== Demographics ==
=== Language ===
Linguistic composition of the city.

Astara, Iran linguistic composition
language	percent
Azerbaijani	60%
Standard Persian	25%
Talysh	15%

=== Population ===
At the time of the 2006 National Census, the city's population was 40,664 in 11,436 households. The following census in 2011 counted 48,470 people in 14,639 households. The 2016 census measured the population of the city as 51,579 people in 16,696 households.

== Climate ==
Astara has a humid subtropical climate (Köppen: Cfa, Trewartha: Cf), with relatively cold, wet winters and warm, humid summers. It has the most precipitation days than any other cities in Iran.

Climate data for Astara (1986 - 2010)
Month	Jan	Feb	Mar	Apr	May	Jun	Jul	Aug	Sep	Oct	Nov	Dec	Year
Record high °C (°F)	26.6 (79.9)	27.2 (81.0)	31.6 (88.9)	32.0 (89.6)	31.6 (88.9)	34.8 (94.6)	36.2 (97.2)	36.6 (97.9)	34.6 (94.3)	32.6 (90.7)	29.6 (85.3)	29.0 (84.2)	36.6 (97.9)
Mean daily maximum °C (°F)	8.9 (48.0)	9.2 (48.6)	11.6 (52.9)	16.3 (61.3)	21.5 (70.7)	27.0 (80.6)	29.8 (85.6)	29.7 (85.5)	25.4 (77.7)	20.5 (68.9)	15.1 (59.2)	11.1 (52.0)	18.8 (65.9)
Daily mean °C (°F)	5.7 (42.3)	6.1 (43.0)	8.6 (47.5)	13.0 (55.4)	17.9 (64.2)	22.8 (73.0)	25.4 (77.7)	25.5 (77.9)	21.8 (71.2)	17.4 (63.3)	12.0 (53.6)	7.9 (46.2)	15.3 (59.6)
Mean daily minimum °C (°F)	2.5 (36.5)	2.9 (37.2)	5.6 (42.1)	9.7 (49.5)	14.4 (57.9)	18.6 (65.5)	21.1 (70.0)	21.3 (70.3)	18.3 (64.9)	14.2 (57.6)	8.9 (48.0)	4.7 (40.5)	11.9 (53.3)
Record low °C (°F)	−7.8 (18.0)	−5.0 (23.0)	−1.6 (29.1)	0.6 (33.1)	5.4 (41.7)	12.0 (53.6)	14.8 (58.6)	14.2 (57.6)	11.4 (52.5)	5.8 (42.4)	0.0 (32.0)	−5.0 (23.0)	−7.8 (18.0)
Average precipitation mm (inches)	87.5 (3.44)	92.3 (3.63)	111.2 (4.38)	80.5 (3.17)	63.7 (2.51)	45.9 (1.81)	46.7 (1.84)	77.8 (3.06)	230.6 (9.08)	243.4 (9.58)	157.4 (6.20)	108.0 (4.25)	1,345 (52.95)
Average precipitation days	12.5	13.1	15.5	15.0	13.6	8.6	6.0	8.3	13.2	16.0	14.1	12.2	148.1
Average snowy days	2.4	3.8	0.8	0.0	0.0	0.0	0.0	0.0	0.0	0.0	0.1	1.4	8.5
Average relative humidity (%)	83	84	84	83	81	75	73	75	83	87	86	84	82
Mean monthly sunshine hours	99.6	97.6	108.4	131.0	193.7	251.5	263.7	228.1	149.6	114.9	95.0	89.6	1,822.7
Source 1: Iranian Meteorological Organization
Source 2: Shahrekord Meteorology Database

== Agriculture ==
Rice has been cultivated in this region for many years, where some indigenous cultivars (landrace) were conventionally bred by farmers.

== Culture ==
Astara is home to one of the first libraries established in the country.

== Tourism ==
Astara has various attractions and is considered a major tourist destination for Iranians and foreigners, especially those from the Caucasus. The city has a selection of beaches and is near to a Temperate rainforest. Annually over six million Iranians, and six hundred thousand foreigners visit the city. The most popular beaches in this city are Shariati park and Sadaf beach. Shariati beach park is located in the city, and Sadaf beach is 7 kilometers from Astara city

== Education ==
- Islamic Azad University of Astara

== Notable people ==
- Fereydun Ebrahimi – Procurator-General in Azerbaijan People's Government
- Ebrahim Nabavi – Iranian journalist
- Payan Rafat – football player
- Kamal Habibollahi – last Commander of the Imperial Iranian Navy

== See also ==
- Astara, Azerbaijan
- Astarachay
- Kazi Magomed–Astara–Abadan pipeline

Media related to Astara, Iran at Wikimedia Commons
