= Virmuni Rural District =

Rural district in Gilan province, Iran

Virmuni Rural District Persian: دهستان ويرموني
- Rural District
- Location within Iran
- Coordinates: 38°24′N 48°49′E
- Country: Iran
- Province: Gilan
- County: Astara
- District: Central
- Established: 1987
- Capital: Virmuni

Population (2016)
  - Total: 14,146
- Time zone: UTC+3:30 (IRST)

Virmuni Rural District (Persian: دهستان ويرموني) is in the Central District of Astara County, Gilan province, in Iran. Its capital is the village of Virmuni.

== Demographics ==
=== Population ===
At the time of the 2006 National Census, the rural district's population was 14,970 in 3,720 households. There were 13,099 inhabitants in 3,665 households at the following census of 2011. The 2016 census measured the population of the rural district as 14,146 in 4,358 households. The most populous of its 27 villages was Virmuni, with 2,440 people.

=== Other villages in the rural district ===
- Abbasabad
- Anbaran Mahalleh
- Baghcheh Sara
- Bijarabin
- Jebrail Mahalleh
- Khoshk Dahaneh
