= Lavandevil District =

District in Gilan province, Iran

Lavandevil District Persian: بخش لوندویل
- District
- Location within Iran
- Coordinates: 38°18′N 48°47′E
- Country: Iran
- Province: Gilan
- County: Astara
- Established: 2002
- Capital: Lavandevil

Population (2016)
  - Total: 22,814
- Time zone: UTC+3:30 (IRST)

Lavandevil District (Persian: بخش لوندویل) is in Astara County, Gilan province, in northwestern Iran. Its capital is the city of Lavandevil.

== Demographics ==
=== Population ===
At the time of the 2006 National Census, the district's population was 20,721 in 4,891 households. The following census in 2011 counted 22,688 people in 6,229 households. The 2016 census measured the population of the district as 22,814 inhabitants in 6,822 households.

=== Administrative divisions ===
Lavandevil District Population
Administrative Divisions	2006	2011	2016
Chelevand RD	7,553	5,743	5,370
Lavandevil RD	6,796	6,328	6,209
Lavandevil (city)	6,372	10,617	11,235
Total	20,721	22,688	22,814
RD = Rural District
