= Central District (Astara County) =

District in Gilan province, Iran

Central District (Astara County) Persian: بخش مرکزی شهرستان آستارا
- District
- Location within Iran
- Coordinates: 38°22′N 48°44′E
- Country: Iran
- Province: Gilan
- County: Astara
- Capital: Astara

Population (2016)
  - Total: 68,443
- Time zone: UTC+3:30 (IRST)

The Central District of Astara County (Persian: بخش مرکزی شهرستان آستارا) is in Gilan province, Iran. Its capital is the city of Astara.

== Demographics ==
=== Population ===
At the time of the 2006 National Census, the district's population was 58,695 in 15,834 households. The following census in 2011 counted 64,069 people in 18,963 households. The 2016 census measured the population of the district as 68,443 inhabitants in 21,920 households.

=== Administrative divisions ===
Central District (Astara County) Population
Administrative Divisions	2006	2011	2016
Heyran RD	3,061	2,500	2,718
Virmuni RD	14,970	13,099	14,146
Astara (city)	40,664	48,470	51,579
Total	58,695	64,069	68,443
RD = Rural District
