= Astara County =

County in Ardabil province, Iran

Astara County Persian: شهرستان آستارا
- County
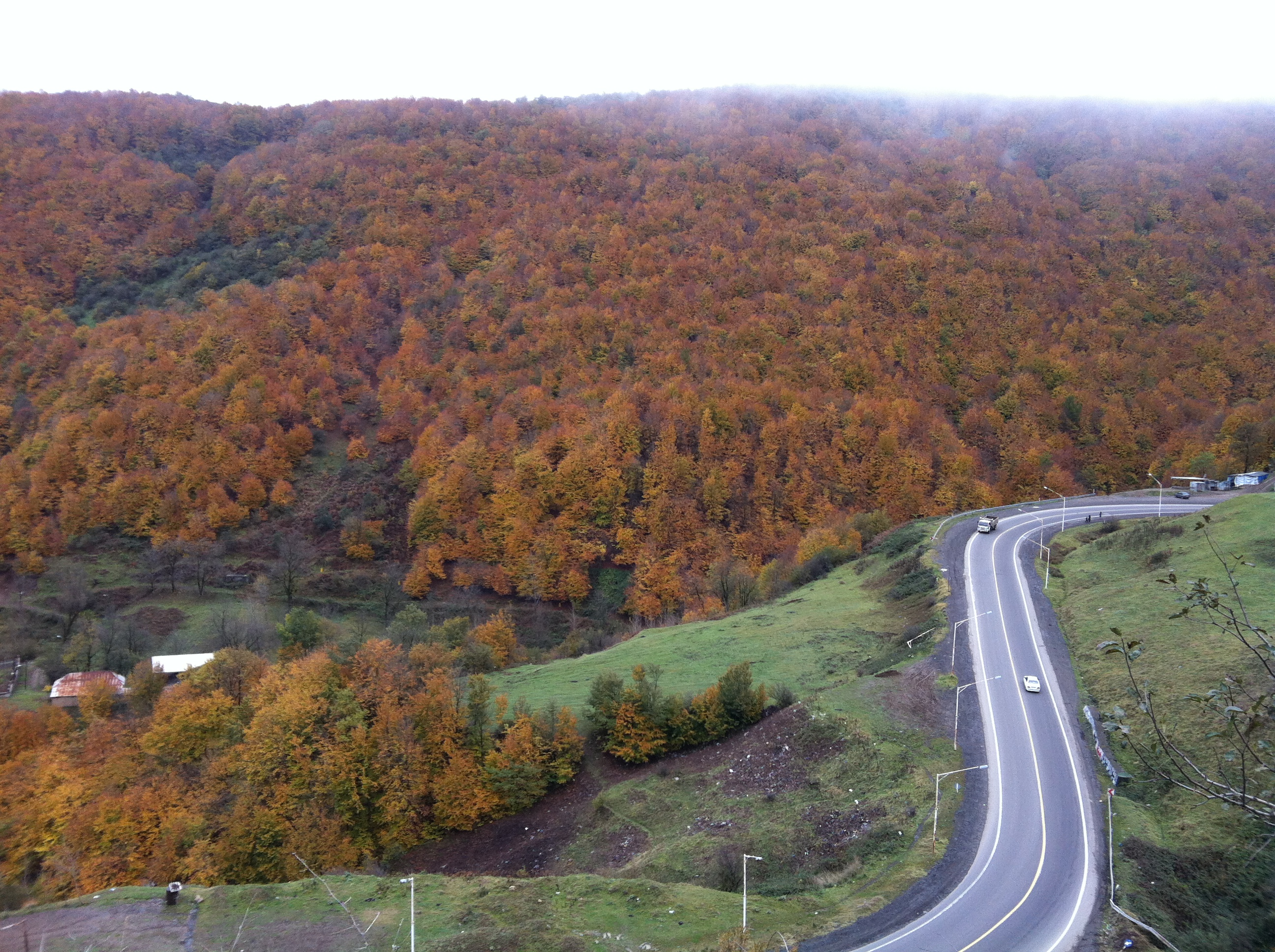
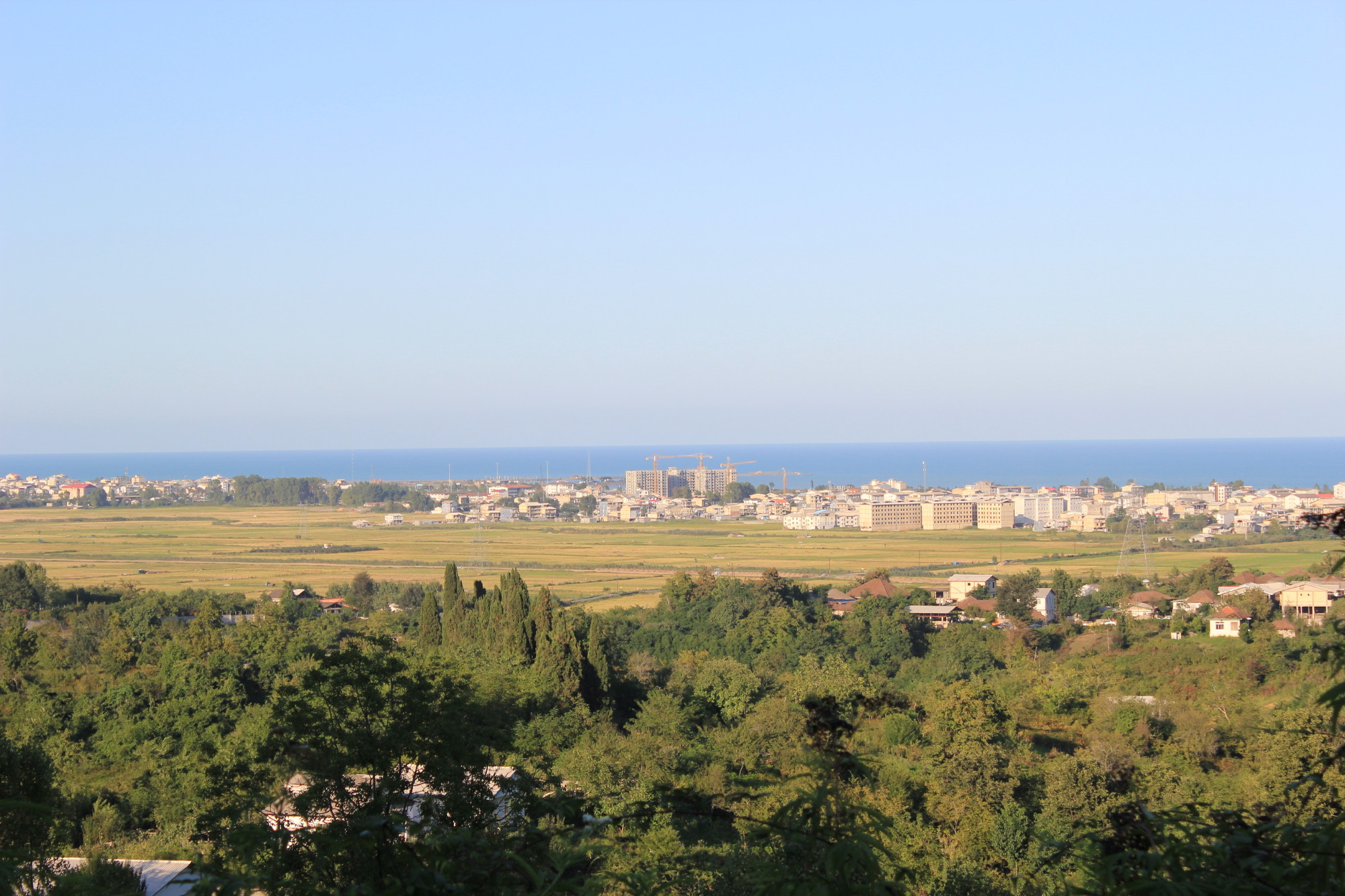
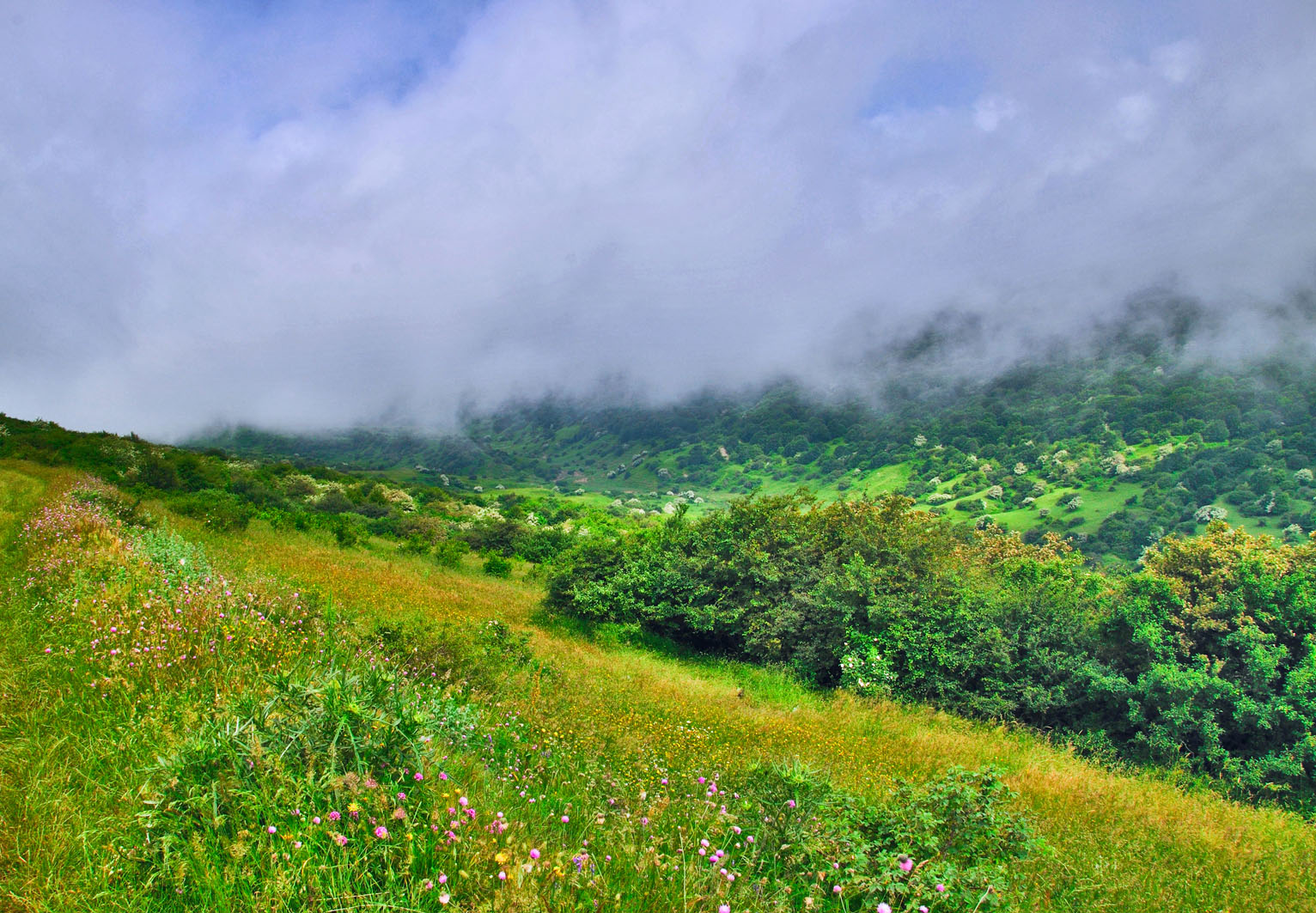
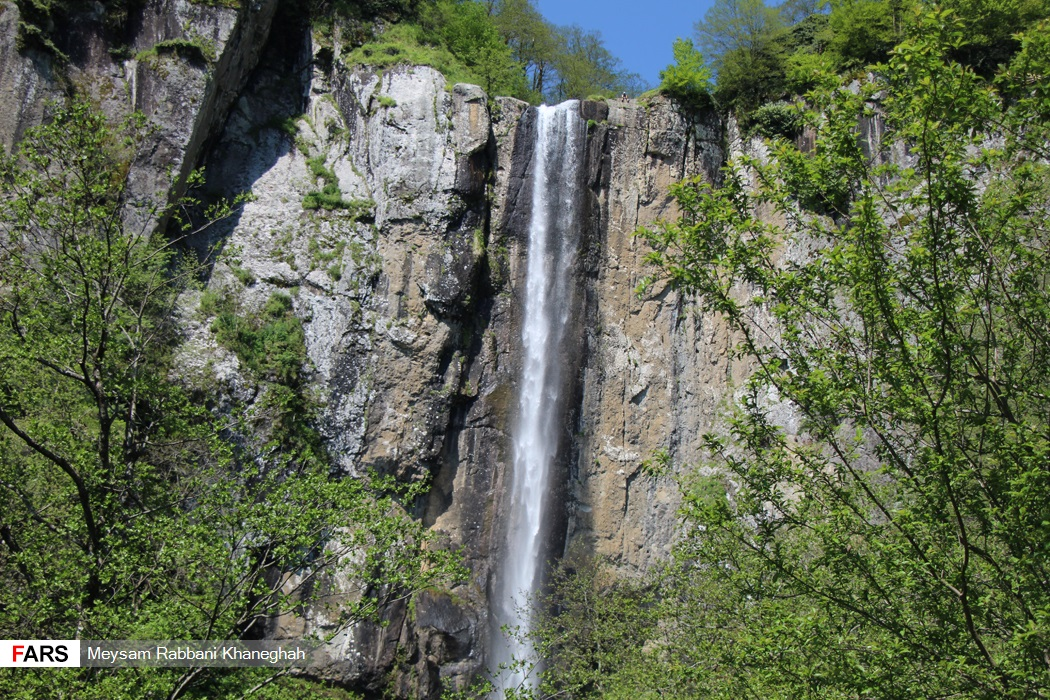

- Location of Astara County in Gilan province (top, yellow)

- Location of Gilan province in Iran
- Coordinates: 38°21′N 48°44′E
- Country: Iran
- Province: Gilan
- Capital: Astara
- Districts: Central, Lavandevil

Population (2016)
  - Total: 91,257
- Time zone: UTC+3:30 (IRST)

Astara County (Persian: شهرستان آستارا) is in Gilan province, in northwestern Iran. Its capital is the city of Astara.

== Demographics ==
=== Population ===
At the time of the 2006 National Census, the county's population was 79,416 in 20,725 households. The following census in 2011 counted 86,757 people in 25,176 households. The 2016 census measured the population of the county as 91,257 in 28,742 households.

=== Administrative divisions ===
Astara County's population history and administrative structure over three consecutive censuses are shown in the following table.

Astara County Population
Administrative Divisions	2006	2011	2016
Central District	58,695	64,069	68,443
Heyran RD	3,061	2,500	2,718
Virmuni RD	14,970	13,099	14,146
Astara (city)	40,664	48,470	51,579
Lavandevil District	20,721	22,688	22,814
Chelevand RD	7,553	5,743	5,370
Lavandevil RD	6,796	6,328	6,209
Lavandevil (city)	6,372	10,617	11,235
Total	79,416	86,757	91,257
RD = Rural District

== See also ==
Media related to Astara County at Wikimedia Commons
