= Hajji Sara =

Village in Gilan province, Iran

Hajji Sara Persian: حاجي سرا
- Village
- Location within Iran
- Coordinates: 37°08′30″N 50°08′31″E
- Country: Iran
- Province: Gilan
- County: Langarud
- District: Kumeleh
- Rural District: Moridan

Population (2016)
  - Total: 682
- Time zone: UTC+3:30 (IRST)

Hajji Sara (Persian: حاجي سرا) (Note: Also romanized as Ḩājjī Sarā) is a village in Moridan Rural District of Kumeleh District in Langarud County, Gilan province, Iran.

== Demographics ==
=== Population ===
At the time of the 2006 National Census, the village's population was 902 in 271 households. The following census in 2011 counted 828 people in 284 households. The 2016 census measured the population of the village as 682 people in 249 households.
