= Sigarud =

Village in Gilan province, Iran

Sigarud Persian: سيگارود
- Village
- Location within Iran
- Coordinates: 37°09′17″N 50°12′03″E
- Country: Iran
- Province: Gilan
- County: Langarud
- District: Kumeleh
- Rural District: Daryasar

Population (2016)
  - Total: 536
- Time zone: UTC+3:30 (IRST)

Sigarud (Persian: سيگارود) (Note: Also romanized as Sigarood and Sīgārūd) is a village in Daryasar Rural District of Kumeleh District in Langarud County, Gilan province, Iran.

== Demographics ==
=== Population ===
At the time of the 2006 National Census, the village's population was 632 in 204 households. The following census in 2011 counted 620 people in 231 households. The 2016 census measured the population of the village as 536 people in 212 households.
