= Solush =

Village in Gilan province, Iran

Solush Persian: سلوش
- Village
- Location within Iran
- Coordinates: 37°07′09″N 50°10′39″E
- Country: Iran
- Province: Gilan
- County: Langarud
- District: Kumeleh
- Rural District: Moridan

Population (2016)
  - Total: 319
- Time zone: UTC+3:30 (IRST)

Solush (Persian: سلوش) (Note: Also romanized as Solūsh) is a village in Moridan Rural District of Kumeleh District in Langarud County, Gilan province, Iran.

== Demographics ==
=== Population ===
At the time of the 2006 National Census, the village's population was 402 in 139 households. The following census in 2011 counted 369 people in 135 households. The 2016 census measured the population of the village as 319 people in 126 households.
