= Kia Gahan =

Village in Gilan province, Iran

Kia Gahan Persian: كياگهان
- Village
- Location within Iran
- Coordinates: 37°06′04″N 50°10′23″E
- Country: Iran
- Province: Gilan
- County: Langarud
- District: Kumeleh
- Rural District: Moridan

Population (2016)
  - Total: 642
- Time zone: UTC+3:30 (IRST)

Kia Gahan (Persian: كياگهان) (Note: Also romanized as Kīā Gahān; also known as Kīā Kahān) is a village in Moridan Rural District of Kumeleh District in Langarud County, Gilan province, Iran.

== Demographics ==
=== Population ===
At the time of the 2006 National Census, the village's population was 822 in 216 households. The following census in 2011 counted 799 people in 236 households. The 2016 census measured the population of the village as 642 people in 214 households.
