= Kelidbar, Langarud =

Village in Gilan province, Iran

Kelidbar Persian: كليدبر
- Village
- Location within Iran
- Coordinates: 37°10′33″N 50°11′16″E
- Country: Iran
- Province: Gilan
- County: Langarud
- District: Kumeleh
- Rural District: Daryasar

Population (2016)
  - Total: 1,647
- Time zone: UTC+3:30 (IRST)

Kelidbar (Persian: كليدبر) (Note: Also romanized as Kelīd Bor and Kelīdbar) is a village in Daryasar Rural District of Kumeleh District in Langarud County, Gilan province, Iran.

== Demographics ==
=== Population ===
At the time of the 2006 National Census, the village's population was 1,993 in 553 households. The following census in 2011 counted 1,647 people in 509 households. The 2016 census measured the population of the village as 1,647 people in 576 households.
