= Liseh Rud =

Village in Gilan province, Iran

Liseh Rud Persian: ليسه رود
- Village
- Location within Iran
- Coordinates: 37°08′09″N 50°07′47″E
- Country: Iran
- Province: Gilan
- County: Langarud
- District: Kumeleh
- Rural District: Moridan

Population (2016)
  - Total: 389
- Time zone: UTC+3:30 (IRST)

Liseh Rud (Persian: ليسه رود) (Note: Also romanized as Līseh Rūd and Līsehrūd) is a village in Moridan Rural District of Kumeleh District in Langarud County, Gilan province, Iran.

== Demographics ==
=== Population ===
At the time of the 2006 National Census, the village's population was 544 in 155 households. The following census in 2011 counted 470 people in 150 households. The 2016 census measured the population of the village as 389 people in 141 households.
