= Salkuyeh =

Salkuyeh (Persian: سالكويه) may refer to:

- Bala Salkuyeh
- Pain Salkuyeh
