= Daryasar, Gilan =

Village in Gilan province, Iran

Daryasar Persian: درياسر
- Village
- Location within Iran
- Coordinates: 37°10′44″N 50°10′46″E
- Country: Iran
- Province: Gilan
- County: Langarud
- District: Kumeleh
- Rural District: Daryasar

Population (2016)
  - Total: 2,940
- Time zone: UTC+3:30 (IRST)

Daryasar (Persian: درياسر) (Note: Also romanized as Daryāsar) is a village in, and the capital of, Daryasar Rural District in Kumeleh District of Langarud County, Gilan province, Iran.

== Demographics ==
=== Population ===
At the time of the 2006 National Census, the village's population was 2,557 in 744 households. The following census in 2011 counted 2,600 people in 851 households. The 2016 census measured the population of the village as 2,940 people in 1,051 households. It was the most populous village in its rural district.
