= Pain Qazi Mahalleh =

Village in Gilan province, Iran

Pain Qazi Mahalleh Persian: پائين قاضي محله
- Village
- Location within Iran
- Coordinates: 37°10′09″N 50°12′16″E
- Country: Iran
- Province: Gilan
- County: Langarud
- District: Kumeleh
- Rural District: Daryasar

Population (2016)
  - Total: 650
- Time zone: UTC+3:30 (IRST)

Pain Qazi Mahalleh (Persian: پائين قاضي محله) (Note: Also romanized as Pā’īn Qāẕī Maḩalleh; also known as Qāẕī Maḩalleh-ye Pā’īn and Ya‘qūbīyeh) is a village in Daryasar Rural District of Kumeleh District in Langarud County, Gilan province, Iran.

== Demographics ==
=== Population ===
At the time of the 2006 National Census, the village's population was 736 in 201 households. The following census in 2011 counted 666 people in 217 households. The 2016 census measured the population of the village as 650 people in 234 households.
