= Malat =

Village in Gilan province, Iran

Malat Persian: ملاط
- Village
- Location within Iran
- Coordinates: 37°09′41″N 50°09′31″E
- Country: Iran
- Province: Gilan
- County: Langarud
- District: Kumeleh
- Rural District: Daryasar

Population (2016)
  - Total: 980
- Time zone: UTC+3:30 (IRST)

Malat (Persian: ملاط) (Note: Also romanized as Malāţ) is a village in Daryasar Rural District of Kumeleh District in Langarud County, Gilan province, Iran.

== Demographics ==
=== Population ===
At the time of the 2006 National Census, the village's population was 1,034 in 326 households. The following census in 2011 counted 1,037 people in 374 households. The 2016 census measured the population of the village as 980 people in 371 households.
