= Moridan =

Moridan (Persian: مريدان) may refer to:

- Moridan, Langarud, Gilan Province
- Moridan, Rasht, Gilan Province
- Moridan Rural District, in Gilan Province
