= Liarjdemeh =

Village in Gilan province, Iran

Liarjdemeh Persian: ليارج دمه
- Village
- Location within Iran
- Coordinates: 37°09′02″N 50°06′44″E
- Country: Iran
- Province: Gilan
- County: Langarud
- District: Kumeleh
- Rural District: Moridan

Population (2016)
  - Total: 55
- Time zone: UTC+3:30 (IRST)

Liarjdemeh (Persian: ليارج دمه) (Note: Also romanized as Līārjdemeh) is a village in Moridan Rural District of Kumeleh District in Langarud County, Gilan province, Iran.

== Demographics ==
=== Population ===
At the time of the 2006 National Census, the village's population was 79 in 25 households. The following census in 2011 counted 61 people in 21 households. The 2016 census measured the population of the village as 55 people in 23 households.
