= Golab Mahalleh =

Village in Gilan province, Iran

Golab Mahalleh Persian: گلاب محله
- Village
- Location within Iran
- Coordinates: 37°07′42″N 50°10′41″E
- Country: Iran
- Province: Gilan
- County: Langarud
- District: Kumeleh
- Rural District: Daryasar

Population (2016)
  - Total: 267
- Time zone: UTC+3:30 (IRST)

Golab Mahalleh (Persian: گلاب محله) (Note: Also romanized as Golāb Maḩalleh; also known as Gulākmaḩalleh) is a village in Daryasar Rural District of Kumeleh District in Langarud County, Gilan province, Iran.

== Demographics ==
=== Population ===
At the time of the 2006 National Census, the village's population was 370 in 100 households. The following census in 2011 counted 282 people in 86 households. The 2016 census measured the population of the village as 267 people in 91 households.
