= Siah Kord Gavabar =

Village in Gilan province, Iran

Siah Kord Gavabar Persian: سياه كردگوابر
- Village
- Location within Iran
- Coordinates: 37°08′51″N 50°08′57″E
- Country: Iran
- Province: Gilan
- County: Langarud
- District: Kumeleh
- Rural District: Moridan

Population (2016)
  - Total: 82
- Time zone: UTC+3:30 (IRST)

Siah Kord Gavabar (Persian: سياه كردگوابر) (Note: Also romanized as Sīāh Kord Gavābar) is a village in Moridan Rural District of Kumeleh District in Langarud County, Gilan province, Iran.

== Demographics ==
=== Population ===
At the time of the 2006 National Census, the village's population was 129 in 39 households. The following census in 2011 counted 92 people in 29 households. The 2016 census measured the population of the village as 82 people in 27 households.
