= Paresh Kuh =

Village in Gilan province, Iran

Paresh Kuh Persian: پرشكوه
- Village
- Location within Iran
- Coordinates: 37°08′55″N 50°09′40″E
- Country: Iran
- Province: Gilan
- County: Langarud
- District: Kumeleh
- Rural District: Moridan

Population (2016)
  - Total: 894
- Time zone: UTC+3:30 (IRST)

Paresh Kuh (Persian: پرشكوه) (Note: Also romanized as Paresh Kūh and Porshokooh) is a village in Moridan Rural District of Kumeleh District in Langarud County, Gilan province, Iran.

== Demographics ==
=== Population ===
At the time of the 2006 National Census, the village's population was 1,070 in 323 households. The following census in 2011 counted 1,013 people in 352 households. The 2016 census measured the population of the village as 894 people in 334 households.
