= Dadqansara =

Village in Gilan province, Iran

Dadqansara Persian: دادقانسرا
- Village
- Location within Iran
- Coordinates: 37°05′50″N 50°10′14″E
- Country: Iran
- Province: Gilan
- County: Langarud
- District: Kumeleh
- Rural District: Moridan

Population (2016)
  - Total: 91
- Time zone: UTC+3:30 (IRST)

Dadqansara (Persian: دادقانسرا) (Note: Also romanized as Dādqānsarā) is a village in Moridan Rural District of Kumeleh District in Langarud County, Gilan province, Iran.

== Demographics ==
=== Population ===
At the time of the 2006 National Census, the village's population was 117 in 30 households. The following census in 2011 counted 105 people in 31 households. The 2016 census measured the population of the village as 91 people in 31 households.
