= Lasheh =

Lasheh (Persian: لاشه or لشه) may refer to:

- Lasheh, Langarud (لشه - Lasheh)
- Lasheh, Rasht (لاشه - Lāsheh)
