= Moridan, Langarud =

Village in Gilan province, Iran

Moridan Persian: مريدان
- Village
- Location within Iran
- Coordinates: 37°07′14″N 50°09′40″E
- Country: Iran
- Province: Gilan
- County: Langarud
- District: Kumeleh
- Rural District: Moridan

Population (2016)
  - Total: 1,129
- Time zone: UTC+3:30 (IRST)

Moridan (Persian: مريدان) (Note: Also romanized as Morīdān) is a village in, and the capital of, Moridan Rural District in Kumeleh District of Langarud County, Gilan province, Iran.

== Demographics ==
=== Population ===
At the time of the 2006 National Census, the village's population was 1,247 in 370 households. The following census in 2011 counted 1,465 people in 449 households. The 2016 census measured the population of the village as 1,129 people in 413 households. It was the most populous village in its rural district.
