= Lasheh, Langarud =

Village in Gilan province, Iran

Lasheh Persian: لشه
- Village
- Location within Iran
- Coordinates: 37°08′05″N 50°07′07″E
- Country: Iran
- Province: Gilan
- County: Langarud
- District: Kumeleh
- Rural District: Moridan

Population (2016)
  - Total: 146
- Time zone: UTC+3:30 (IRST)

Lasheh (Persian: لشه) is a village in Moridan Rural District of Kumeleh District in Langarud County, Gilan province, Iran.

== Demographics ==
=== Population ===
At the time of the 2006 National Census, the village's population was 216 in 64 households. The following census in 2011 counted 193 people in 60 households. The 2016 census measured the population of the village as 146 people in 55 households.
