= Pain Salkuyeh =

Village in Gilan province, Iran

Pain Salkuyeh Persian: پايين سالكويه
- Village
- Location within Iran
- Coordinates: 37°09′57″N 50°10′14″E
- Country: Iran
- Province: Gilan
- County: Langarud
- District: Kumeleh
- Rural District: Daryasar

Population (2016)
  - Total: 873
- Time zone: UTC+3:30 (IRST)

Pain Salkuyeh (Persian: پايين سالكويه) (Note: Also romanized as Pā’īn Sālkūyeh; also known as Sālkūyeh-ye Pā’īn) is a village in Daryasar Rural District of Kumeleh District in Langarud County, Gilan province, Iran.

== Demographics ==
=== Population ===
At the time of the 2006 National Census, the village's population was 825 in 249 households. The following census in 2011 counted 787 people in 238 households. The 2016 census measured the population of the village as 873 people in 332 households.
