= Bala Salkuyeh =

Village in Gilan province, Iran

Bala Salkuyeh Persian: بالاسالكويه
- Village
- Location within Iran
- Coordinates: 37°10′17″N 50°09′32″E
- Country: Iran
- Province: Gilan
- County: Langarud
- District: Kumeleh
- Rural District: Daryasar

Population (2016)
  - Total: 480
- Time zone: UTC+3:30 (IRST)

Bala Salkuyeh (Persian: بالاسالكويه) (Note: Also romanized as Bālā Sālkūyeh; also known as Sālkūyeh and Sālkūyeh-ye Bālā) is a village in Daryasar Rural District of Kumeleh District in Langarud County, Gilan province, Iran.

== Demographics ==
=== Population ===
At the time of the 2006 National Census, the village's population was 385 in 108 households. The following census in 2011 counted 349 people in 107 households. The 2016 census measured the population of the village as 480 people in 172 households.
