= Khalaj Mahalleh =

Neighborhood in Gilan province, Iran

Khalaj Mahalleh Persian: خلج محله
- Neighborhood
- Location within Iran
- Coordinates: 38°17′59″N 48°52′39″E
- Country: Iran
- Province: Gilan
- County: Astara
- District: Lavandevil
- City: Lavandevil

Population (2006)
  - Total: 977
- Time zone: UTC+3:30 (IRST)

Khalaj Mahalleh (Persian: خلج محله) (Note: Also romanized as Khalaj Maḩalleh; also known as Khalaj Maḩalleh-ye Lavandevīl) is a neighborhood in the city of Lavandevil in Lavandevil District of Astara County, Gilan province, in Iran.

== Demographics ==
=== Population ===
At the time of the 2006 National Census, Khalaj Mahalleh's population, as a village in Chelevand Rural District, was 977 in 238 households. After the census, the village was annexed by the city of Lavandevil.
