= Daryasar Rural District =

Rural district in Gilan province, Iran

Daryasar Rural District Persian: دهستان درياسر
- Rural District
- Location within Iran
- Coordinates: 37°10′N 50°11′E
- Country: Iran
- Province: Gilan
- County: Langarud
- District: Kumeleh
- Established: 1987
- Capital: Daryasar

Population (2016)
  - Total: 8,638
- Time zone: UTC+3:30 (IRST)

Daryasar Rural District (Persian: دهستان درياسر) is in Kumeleh District of Langarud County, Gilan province, Iran. Its capital is the village of Daryasar.

== Demographics ==
=== Population ===
At the time of the 2006 National Census, the rural district's population was 10,508 in 3,049 households. There were 8,264 inhabitants in 2,705 households at the following census of 2011. The 2016 census measured the population of the rural district as 8,638 in 3,133 households. The most populous of its nine villages was Daryasar, with 2,940 people.

=== Other villages in the rural district ===
- Bala Salkuyeh
- Golab Mahalleh
- Kelidbar
- Malat
- Pain Qazi Mahalleh
- Pain Salkuyeh
- Sigarud
