= Aroos-Gooleh =

Traditional drama at Nowruz in Gilan Province

Aroos-Gooleh (Persian: عروس گوله "Bride-Ghoul") is a traditional performance held in the Gilan Province, now a province in northwest Iran, heralding the coming of Nowruz. It is a Gilani way of the narrative of the Amu Nowruz in which the old and the new years' symbol rise against each other. Although this folklore tradition was becoming obsolete, recently the Rural Museum of Gilan has decided to revive it and holds the performance in regular intervals

The main characters of the play are Naz-Khanom, Ghol, and Pir Babo. Ghol takes a club, wears a bulky piece of clothing with bells on it, Pir makes himself like an old person with white beard and moustache, and Naz Khanom role is played by a young man dressed as a young woman. Pir and Ghol challenge to win the heart of Naz Khanom through the performance and at last they fight, Ghol succeeds and ends the play while dancing and singing with Naz Khanom. Naz Khanom is the symbol of righteousness and morality while the Ghol stands for evil-doings. During the performance it turns out that Naz Khanom teaches the Ghol the way to live with good manners and peace.

The troupe performs at nights, when they are called to a neighborhood, they play there and receive in return rice, eggs, comfits, and sometimes money.
