= Lavandevil Wildlife Refuge =

The Lavandevil Wildlife Refuge is a wildlife habitat conservation area in northwestern Iran, along the Caspian Sea coast just north of the city of Lavandevil.

The area was noted in 1991 for the first official sighting of the North American Raccoon in Iran, an invasive species known to have entered Iran from the northern Caucasus region where it had been deliberately introduced by the Soviet Union.
