= Islamic Azad University, Rasht Branch =

Private university in Rasht, Iran

- دانشگاه آزاد اسلامی واحد رشت
- Motto: آرمان ایرانی برای جهانی شدن
- Type: Private
- Established: 1982
- Chancellor: Dr. Mohammad Doostar
- Academic staff: 240 (2021)
- Administrative staff: 261 (2021)
- Students: 12000 (2021)
- Location: Rasht, Gilan, Iran
- Campus: 550,000 m² (main compus)
- Website: http://iaurasht.ac.ir

The Islamic Azad University, Rasht Branch (Persian: دانشگاه آزاد اسلامي واحد رشت) is an Iranian university in Rasht, Gīlān Province. It was founded on 1 September 1982.

== Chancellors ==
Chancellors of The Islamic Azad University of Rasht.

Name	Position	Year
A. Kamali	Assistance Professor	1982-1984
N. Zargham	Assistance Professor	1984-1988
S. Farzaneh	-	1988-2001
R. Simbar	Professor	2001-2007
A. Mir Ebrahimi	Assistance Professor	2007-2012
M. Soror-aldin	Professor	2012
B. Daneshian	Associate Professor	2012-2014
A. Amirtemoori	Professor	2014-2017
A. Chirani	Associate Professor	2017-2020
M. Doostar	Associated Professor	now

== Vice-Chansellors ==
- Alireza Seydavi (Research)
- Shahram Gholamrezaei (Education)
- Ghasem Ghasemi (Student)
- Soheil Shokri (Financial & Planning)

== Schools and Departments ==
- Management and Accounting
- Basic Science
- Nursing and Midwifery
- Agriculture Science
- Engineering
- Human Science

== Faculty members in Google Scholar ==
- Dr Shahab Shariati
- Alireza Amirteimoori
- Hossein Fallah-Bagher-Shaidaei
- All members in Google Scholar

== Journals ==
- Iranian Journal of Optimization (DOAJ), BASE,
- Iranian Journal of Applied Animal Science
- International Journal of Agricultural Management and Development
- Journal of ornamental plants
- مطالعات برنامه ریزی سکونتگاههای انسانی (in Persian)

== Islamic Azad University, Rasht Branch in International Ranking institutions ==
- IAU Rasht in Scopus
- IAU Rasht in Google Scholar
- IAU Rasht in Webometrics

Year	Webometrics		
Year	International	National	IAU
2016 July	3432	89	12
2016 January	9937	179	55
2015 July	11018	196	68
2015 January	13304	210	72

Year	ISC	
Year	National	IAU
2013-14	-	13
2011	-	14
2010	-	19

Year	uniRank
2016	107
