= Khalvasht =

Archaeological site in Iran

- Location in Iran
- 36°39′3.92″N 49°41′19.38″E
- Type: rockshelter
- Periods: Epi-Paleolithic
- Associated with: Modern human
- Location: Gilan Province, Iran
- Region: Amarlu

History
- Built: ca. 20,000 BP
- Abandoned: ca. 12,000 BP

Site notes
- Elevation: 1,100 m (3,600 ft)
- Excavation dates: 2000
- Archaeologists: Fereidoun Biglari, and Hossein Abdi
- Owner: Ministry of Cultural Heritage, Tourism and Handicrafts, Iran

Khalvasht (Persian: خلوشت) is a Late Paleolithic rockshelter site located at the Amarlou region, in the Gilan Province, northern Iran. The shelter is located above the Loshan-Jirandeh road and at an altitude of about 1100 m a.s.l. The site was occupied by the Late Pleistocene hunter-gatherers about 18,000-12,000 years ago.

The shelter faces south and is located at the base of a series of conglomerate outcrops that are about 160 m long. A spring emerges about 300 m to the southwest of the site.

The shelter contains evidence for the late Paleolithic human cave occupation. Stone artifacts were found by two Iranian archaeologists, Fereidoun Biglari and Hossein Abdi in 2000. The artifacts are made of gray and black chert, a red variant of fine red-green chert, fine dark brown chert, and one example of white chert. These rock types are found in pebble and cobble sizes (50 to 200 mm) in the area. The artifacts include flakes, flake fragments, blades and bladelets, a small flake core, and one core tablet. The core tablet is from a bladelet core with scares of previous bladelet removals.
