= Chapalak Cave =

Archaeological site in Iran

Chapalak Cave (Persian: غار چپلک) is a Late Paleolithic site located at the Amarlou region, in the Gilan Province, northern Iran. The cave contains evidence for late Paleolithic human cave occupation.

== Artefacts ==
Stone artifacts and animal remains were excavated by an Iranian Korean team in 2008. They found lithic artifacts (14 pieces: cores and blades/bladelets) in the upper most layer of the test pit that based on their techno-typological characteristics attributed to the Late Paleolithic period.
