= Kumeleh =

City in Gilan province, Iran

Kumeleh Persian: كومله
- City
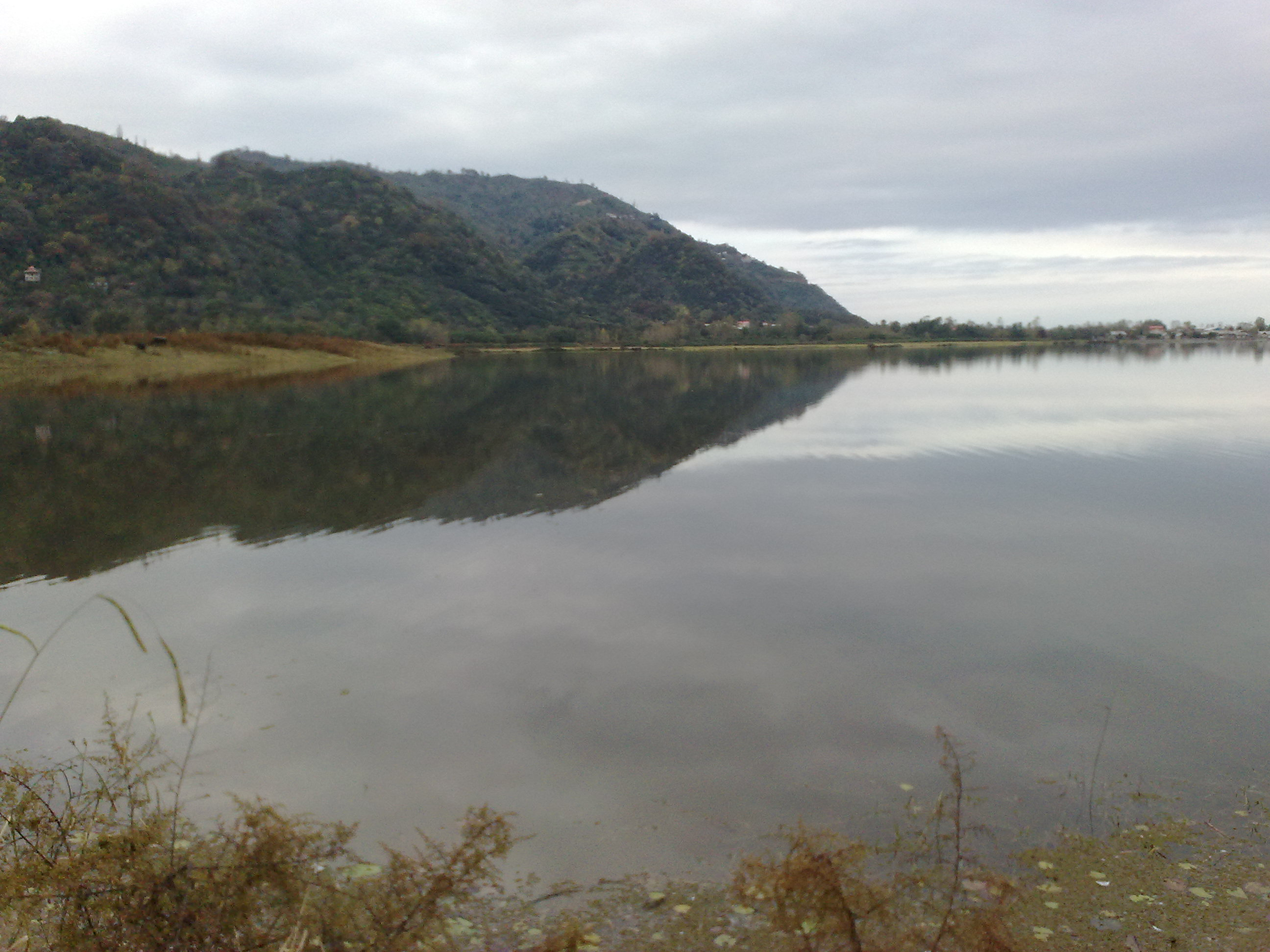
- Kumeleh Lake

- Location within Iran
- Coordinates: 37°08′58″N 50°10′33″E
- Country: Iran
- Province: Gilan
- County: Langarud
- District: Kumeleh

Population (2016)
  - Total: 6,457
- Time zone: UTC+3:30 (IRST)

Kumeleh (Persian: كومله) (Note: Also romanized as Koomleh, Kowmleh, Kūmeleh, and Kvomleh) is a city in, and the capital of, Kumeleh District in Langarud County, Gilan province, Iran.

== Demographics ==
=== Population ===
At the time of the 2006 National Census, the city's population was 5,703 in 1,636 households. The following census in 2011 counted 6,078 people in 1,943 households. The 2016 census measured the population of the city as 6,457 people in 2,255 households.
