= Rudkhan Castle =

Medieval fortress in Iran

- قلعه رودخان
- Near Fuman in Iran
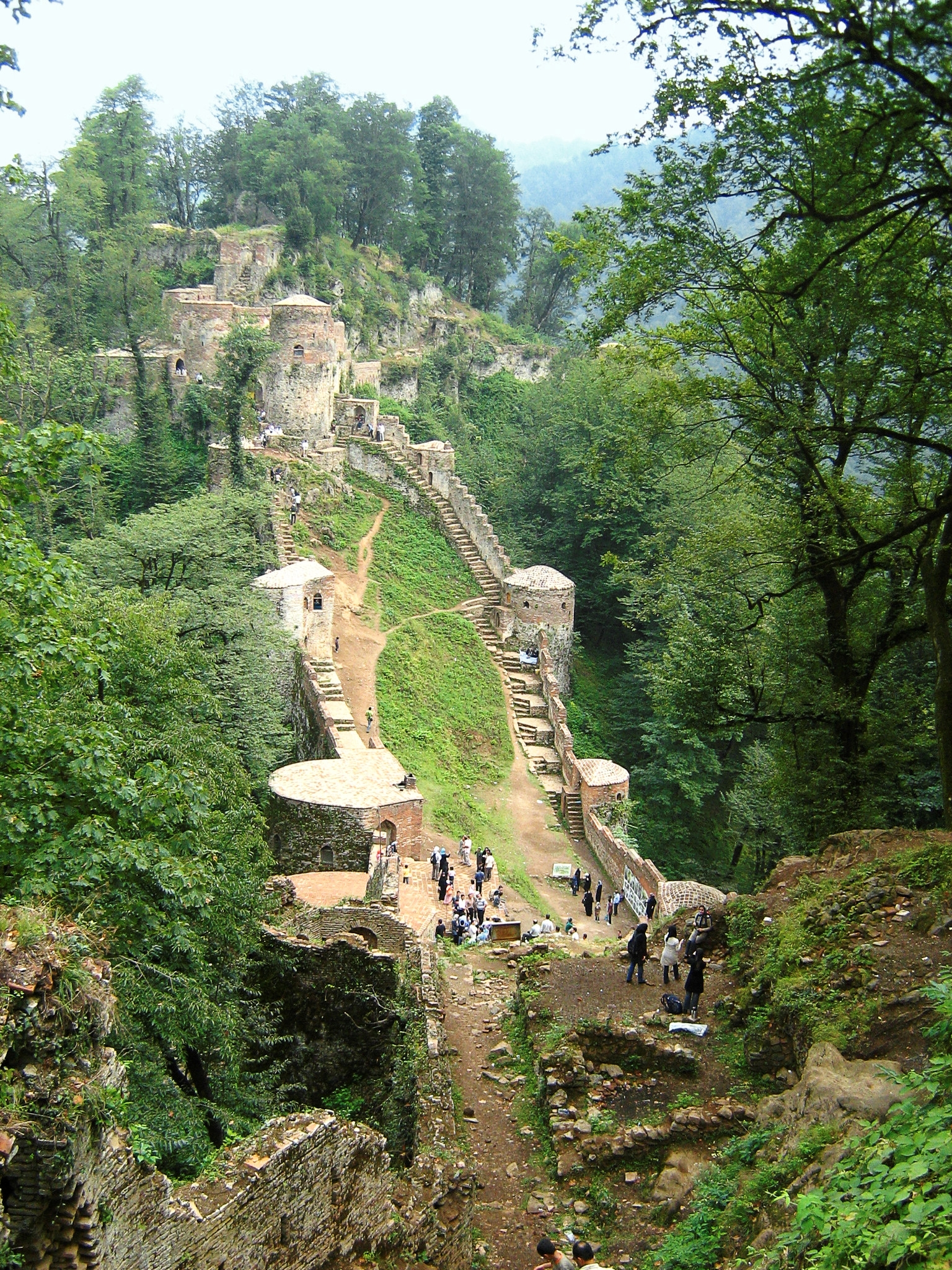
- Rudkhan Castle

Site information
- Type: Fortress

Location
- Coordinates: 37°03′52″N 49°14′24″E
- Length: 1,550 metres

Site history
- Built: Sasanian era
- Materials: Brick and stone

Rudkhan Castle (Persian: قلعه رودخان; Gilaki: رودخان دژ), also Roodkhan Castle, is a brick and stone medieval fortress in Iran that was built to defend against the Arab invaders during the Muslim conquest of Persia. With the fall of the Sasanian Empire, this area became a defensive position against the Arabs in the then-newly established Tabarestan.

Located 25 km southwest of Fuman city north of Iran in Gilan province, it is a military complex which was constructed during the Sasanian era (224-651), and later rebuilt in 1096 by the Nizari Isma'ilis for use by the Assassins. The castle is built on two tips of a mount, with an area of 2.6 hectares (6.4 acres).

The Rudkhan Castle River originates in the surrounding heights and flows from south to north. Rudkhan Castle sits at the two peaks of a mountain at elevations of 715 and 670 metres and contains strong fortifications and battlements at a length of 1,550 metres.

== Description ==
Rudkhan Castle consists of two parts: Arg and Qorkhaneh. Arg is located in the western part of this building on two floors and its material is brick. The Qorkhaneh on the east side are dominated by two floors with multiple skylights and openings. There is also a spring between the castle and its deepest place.

The eastern part of the castle includes twelve entrances, a prison, an emergency door, a bath and a catchment. The western part has twelve entrances, the spring, the pond, the reservoir, the cold storage, the bath, the royal water basin and several residential units surrounded by towers and fortifications.

== Geological features ==
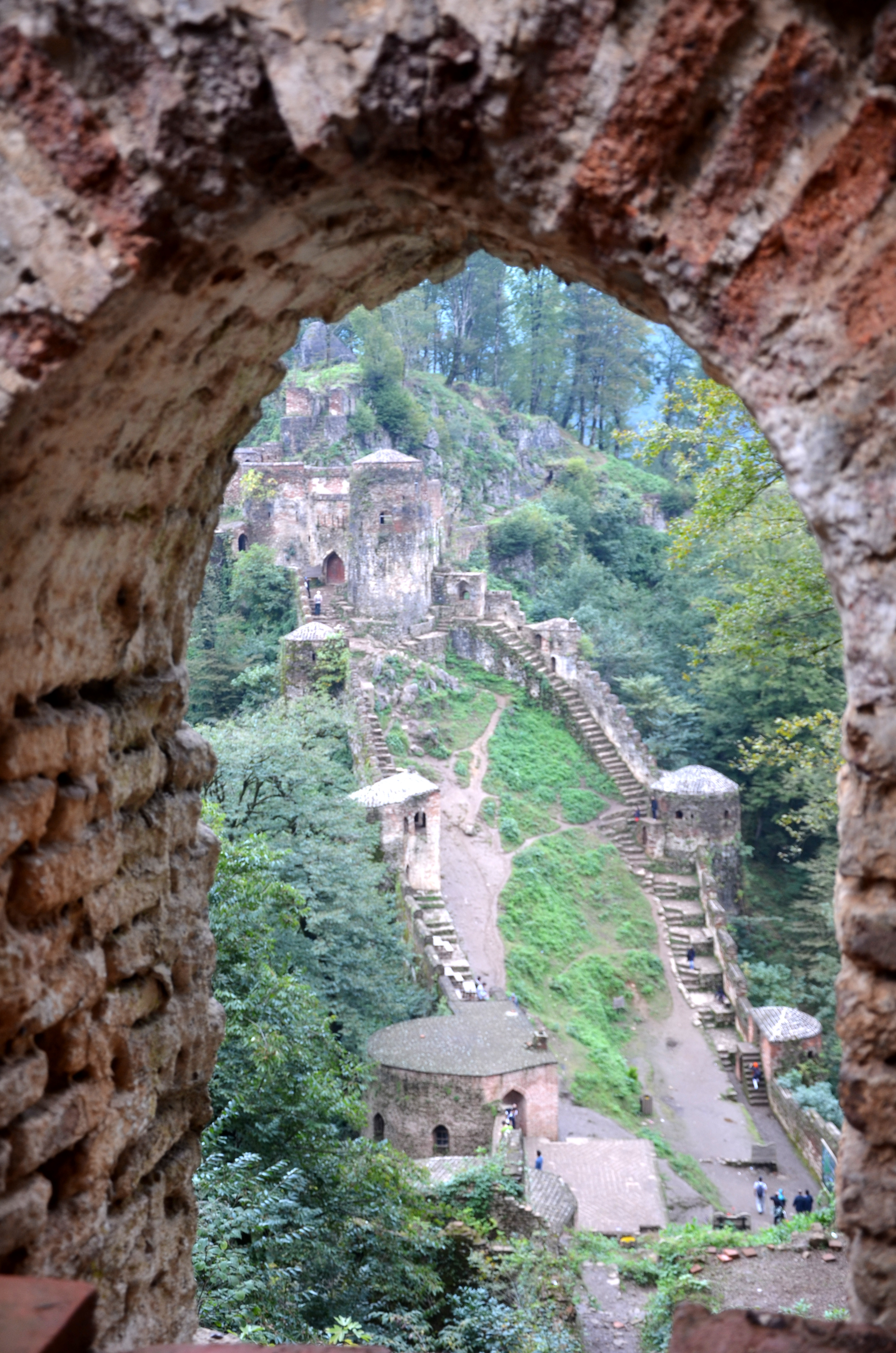

Rudkhan Castle is geologically built in an area that is known as Gasht complex in the geological division and according to Stocklin's studies, it consists of two phases of transformation. The first is related to the Precambrian - Paleozoic with high metamorphic intensity and the second to the Mesozoic time with low absolute metamorphic intensity. According to geological surveys, the presence of iron reserves in this area has a high probability.

== Gallery ==
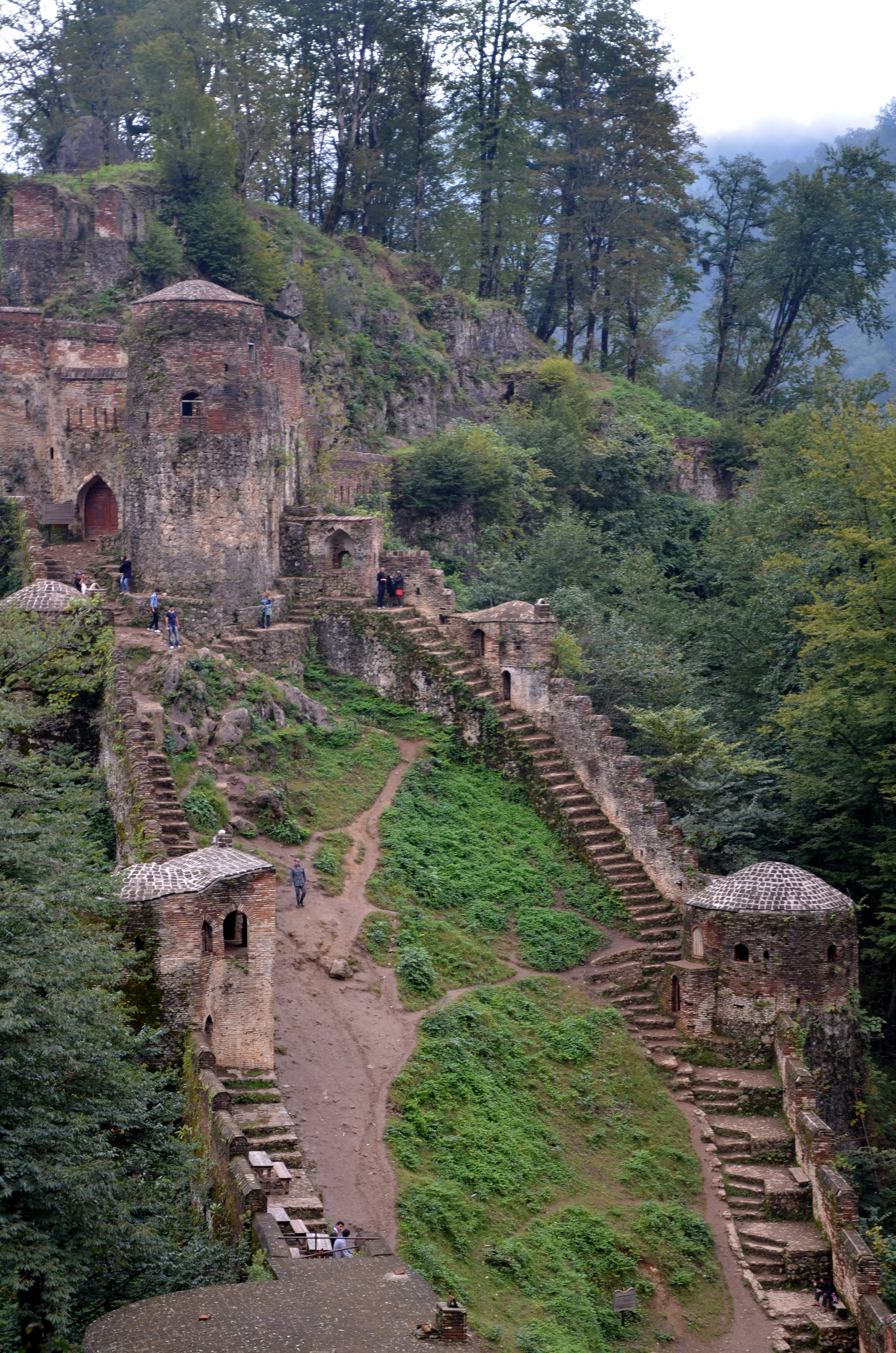

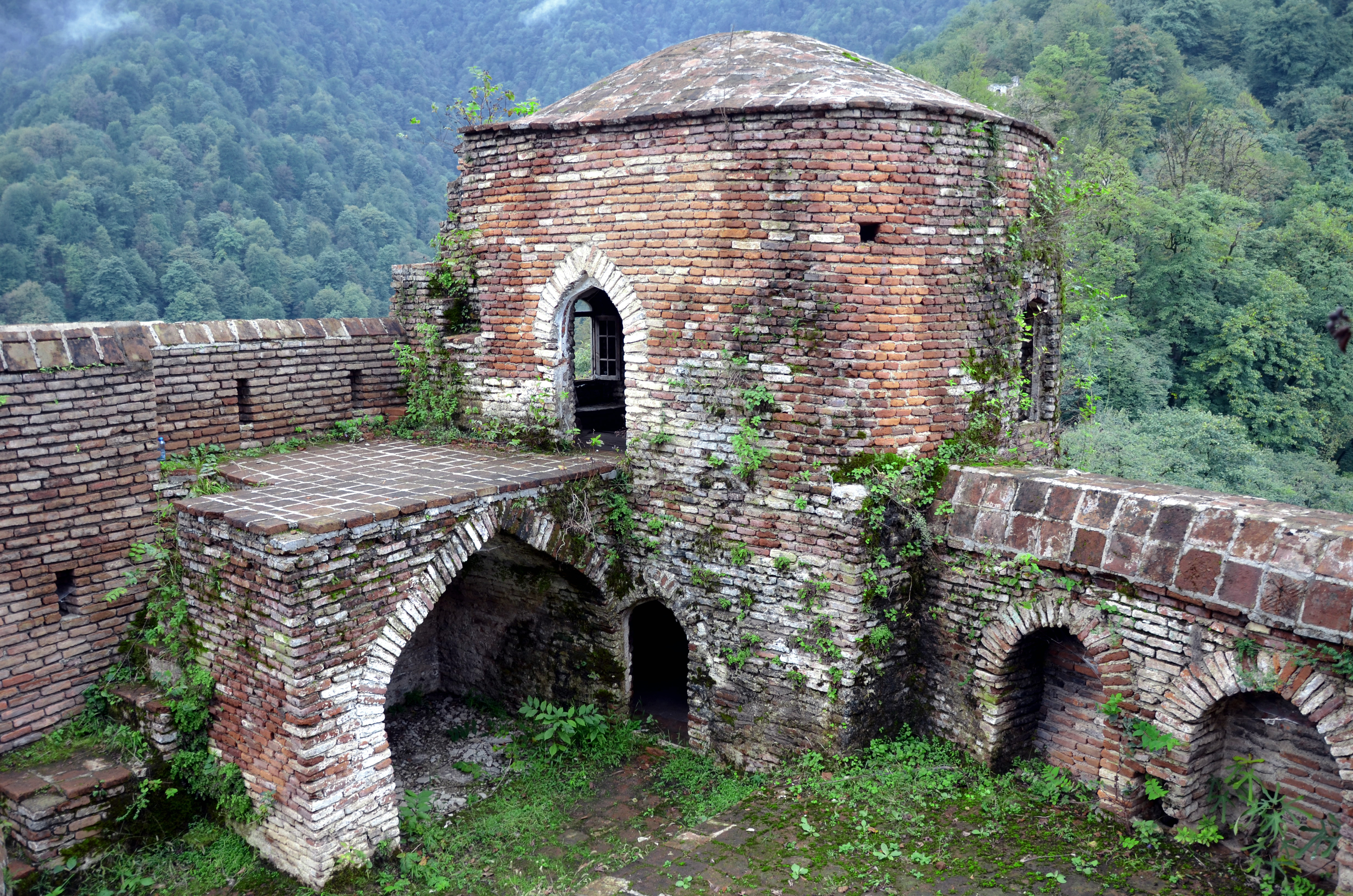

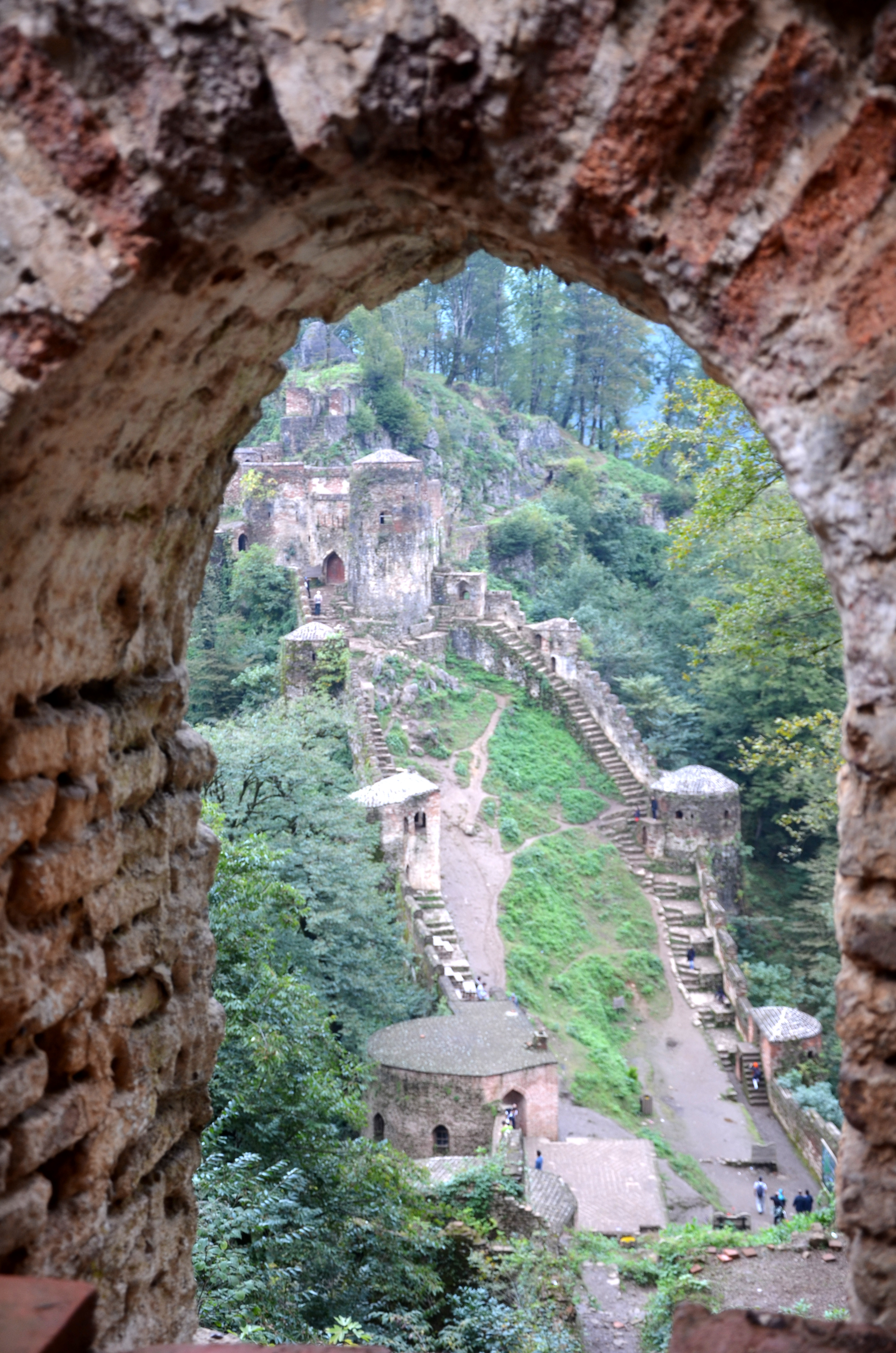

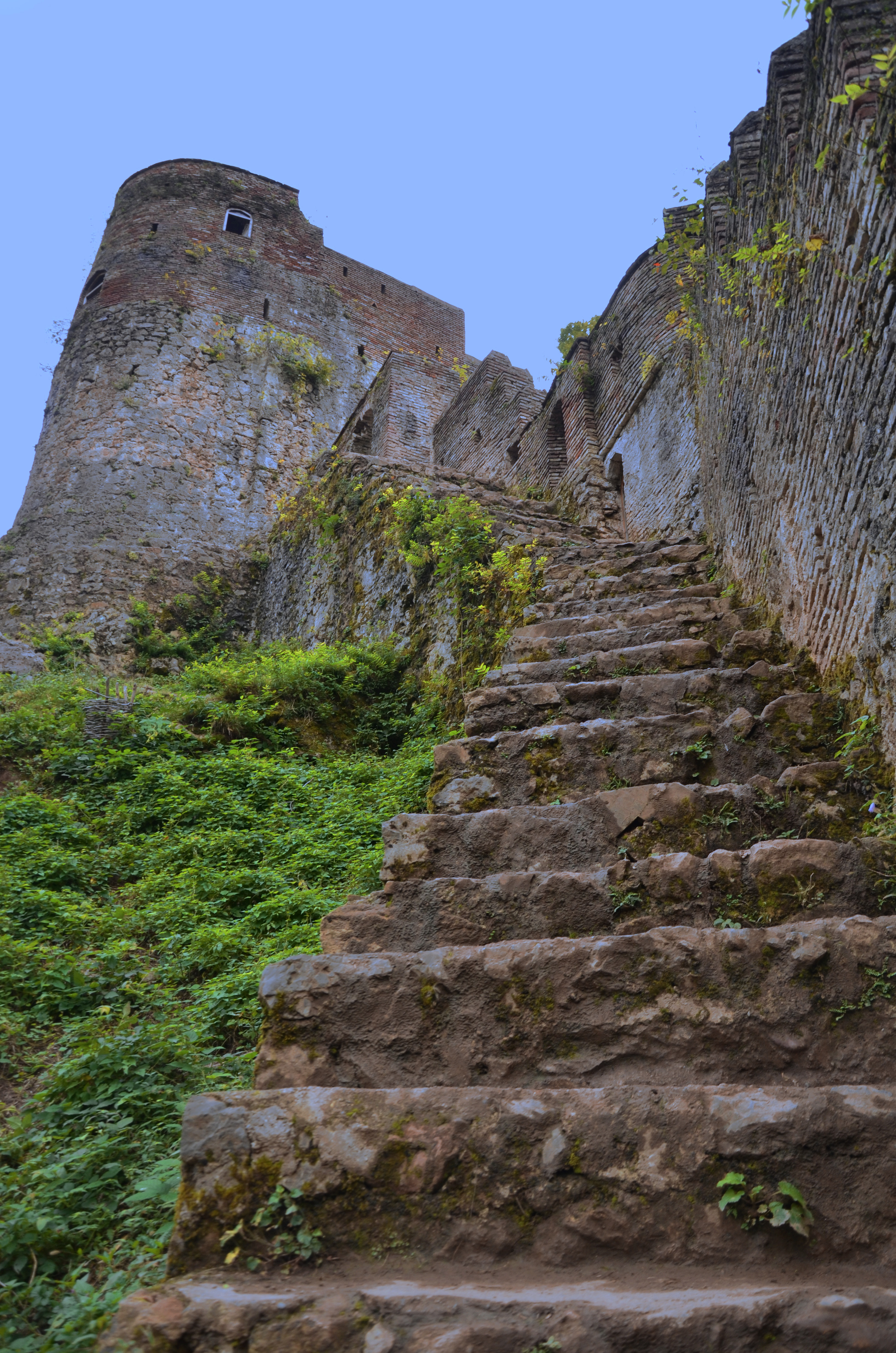

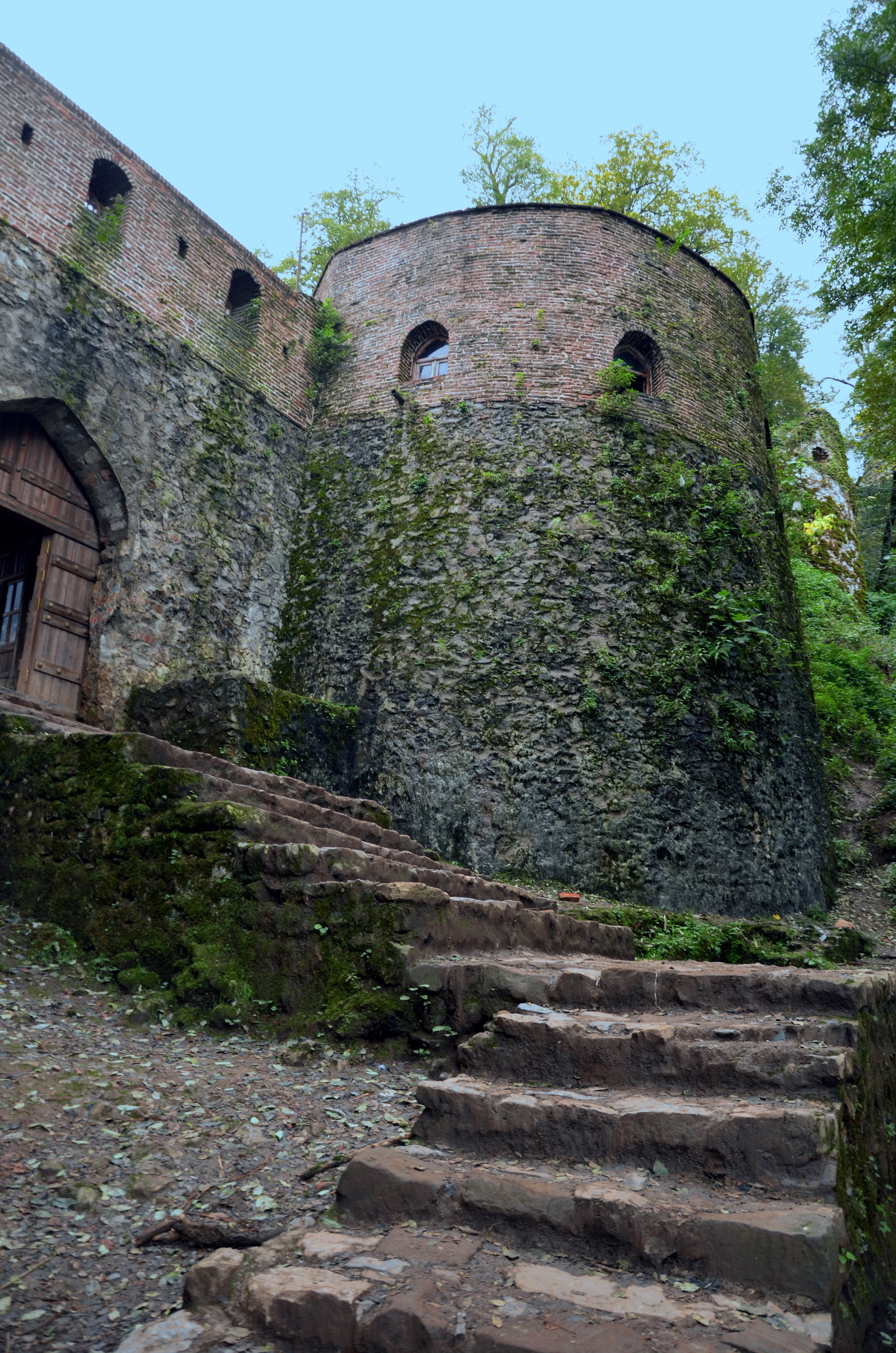

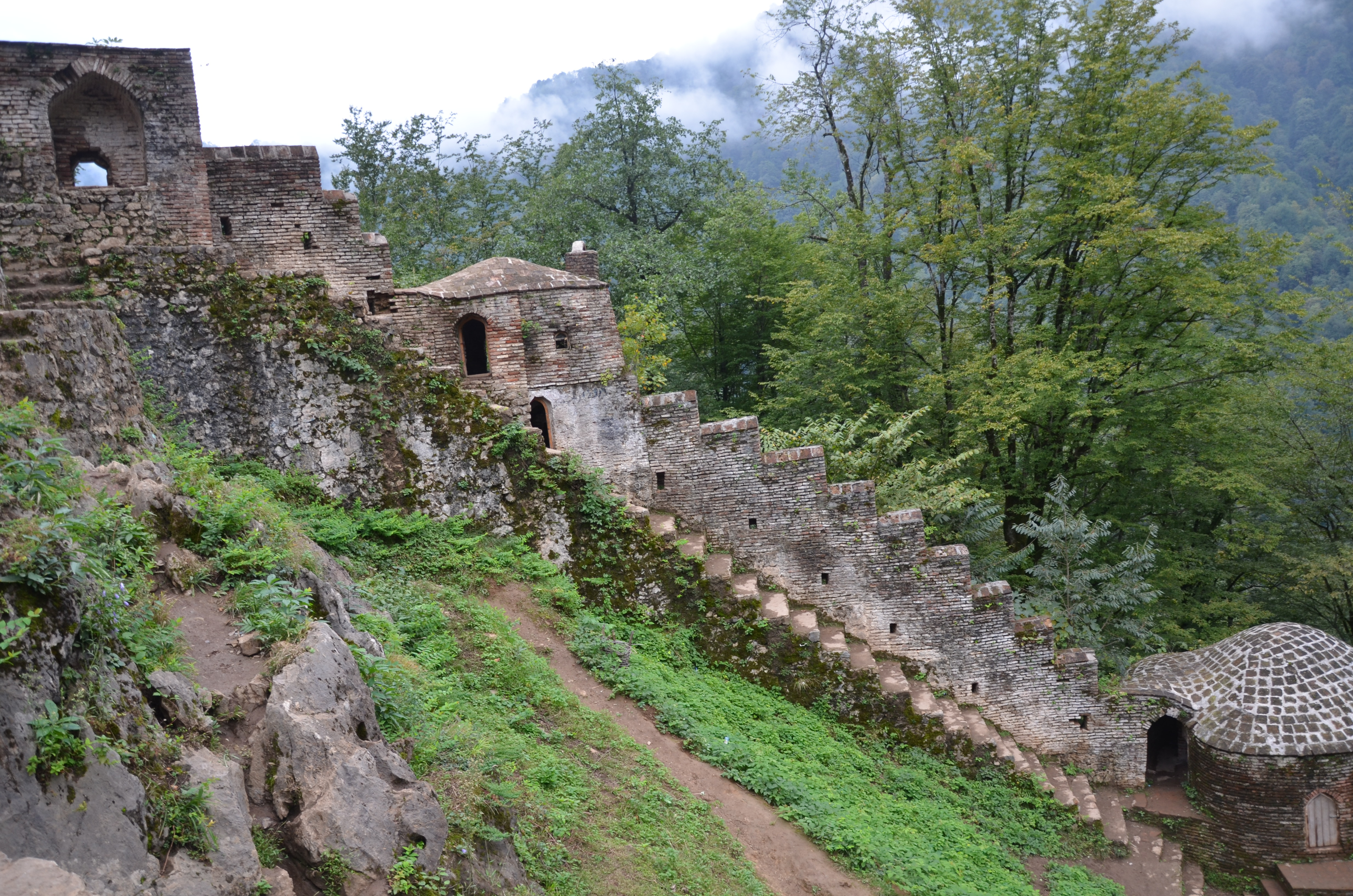

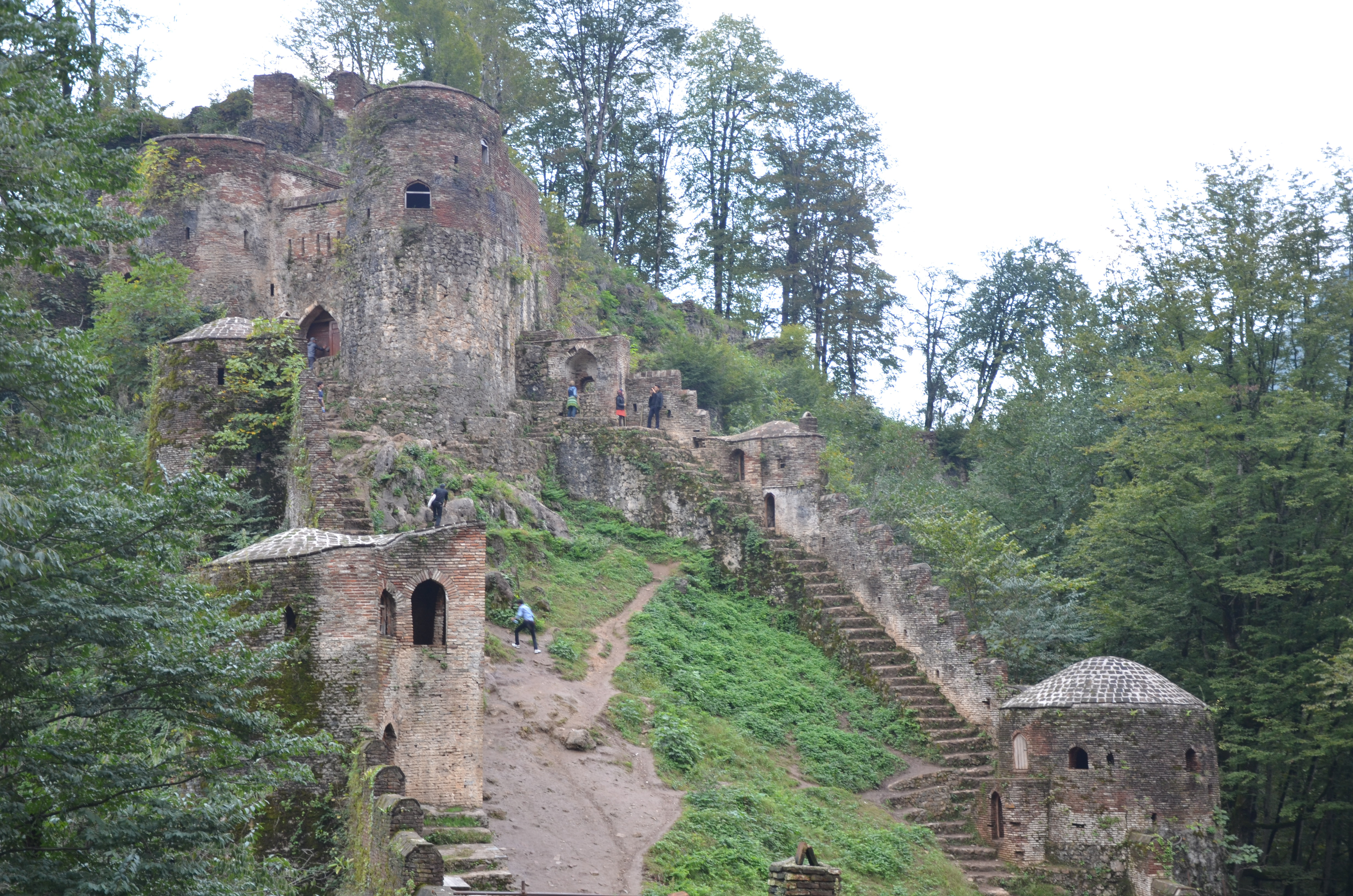

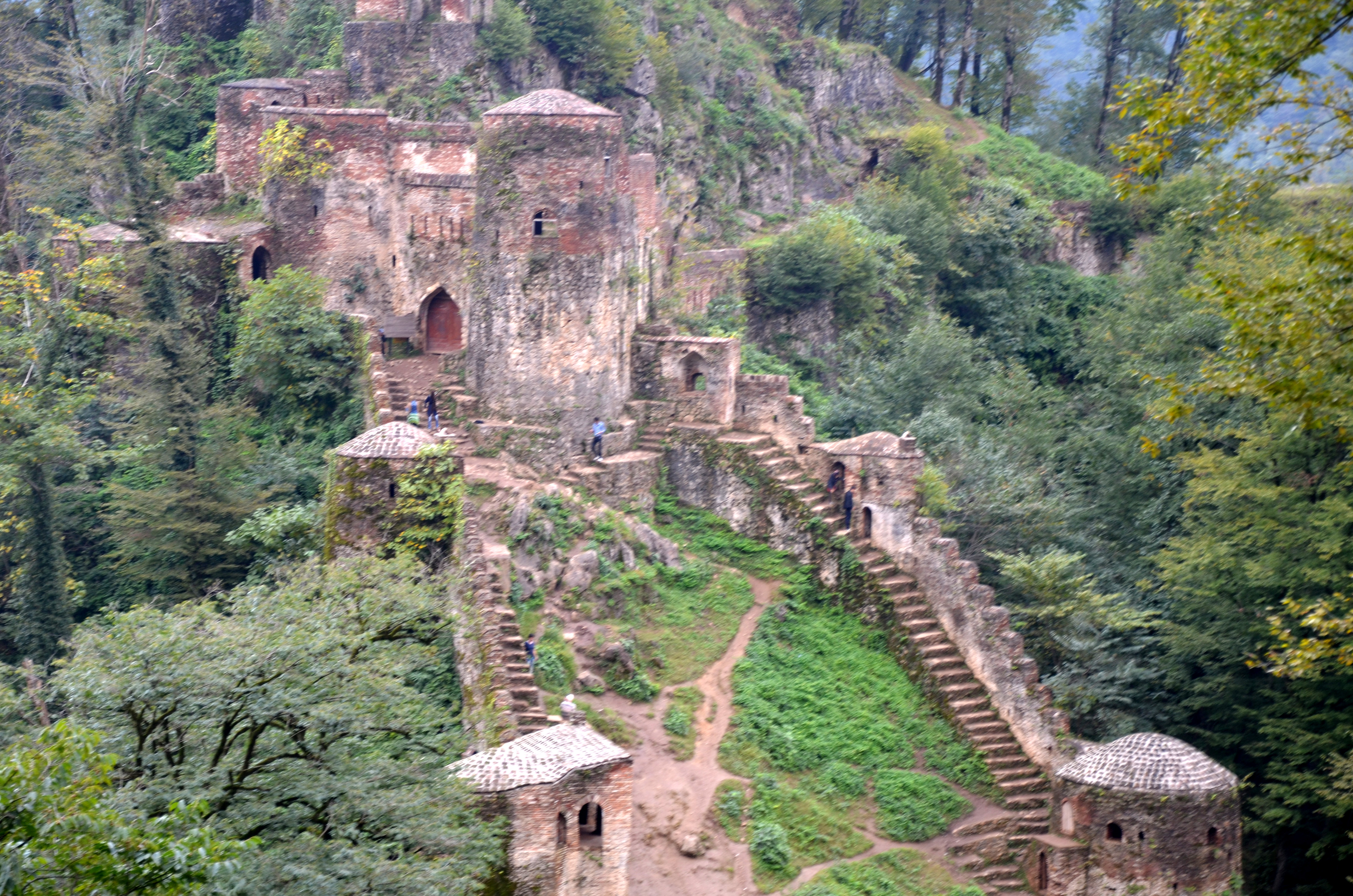

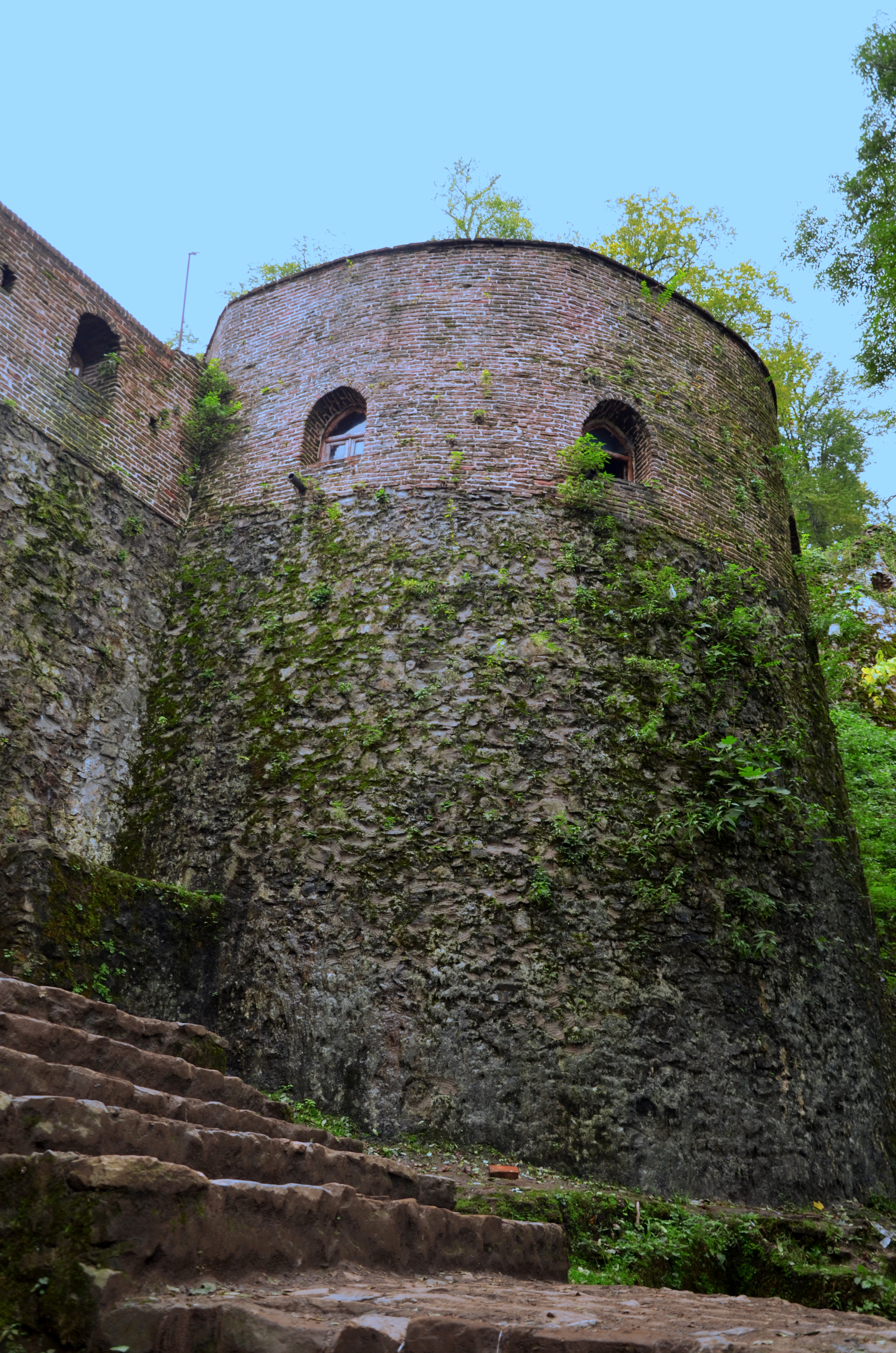

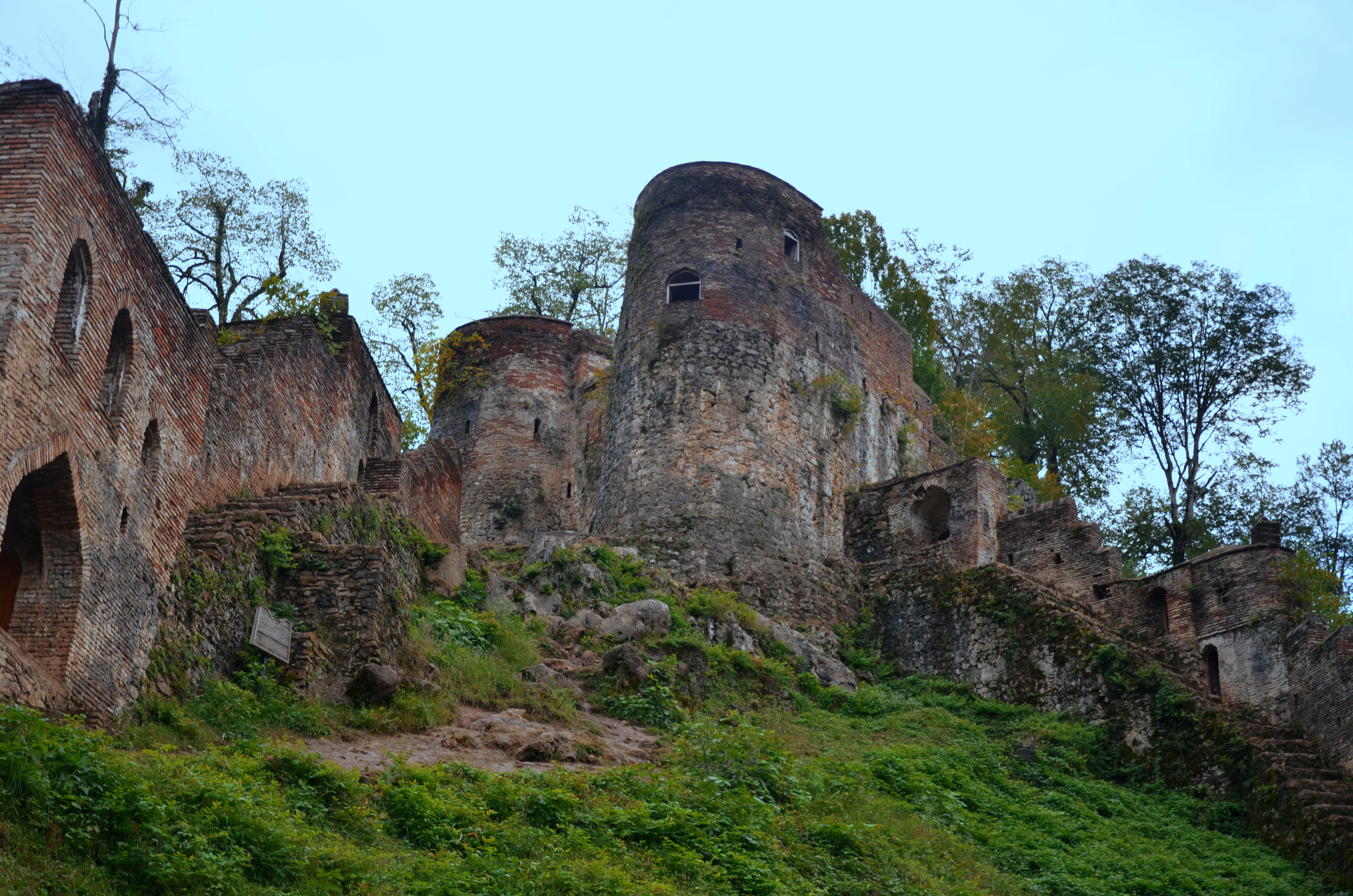

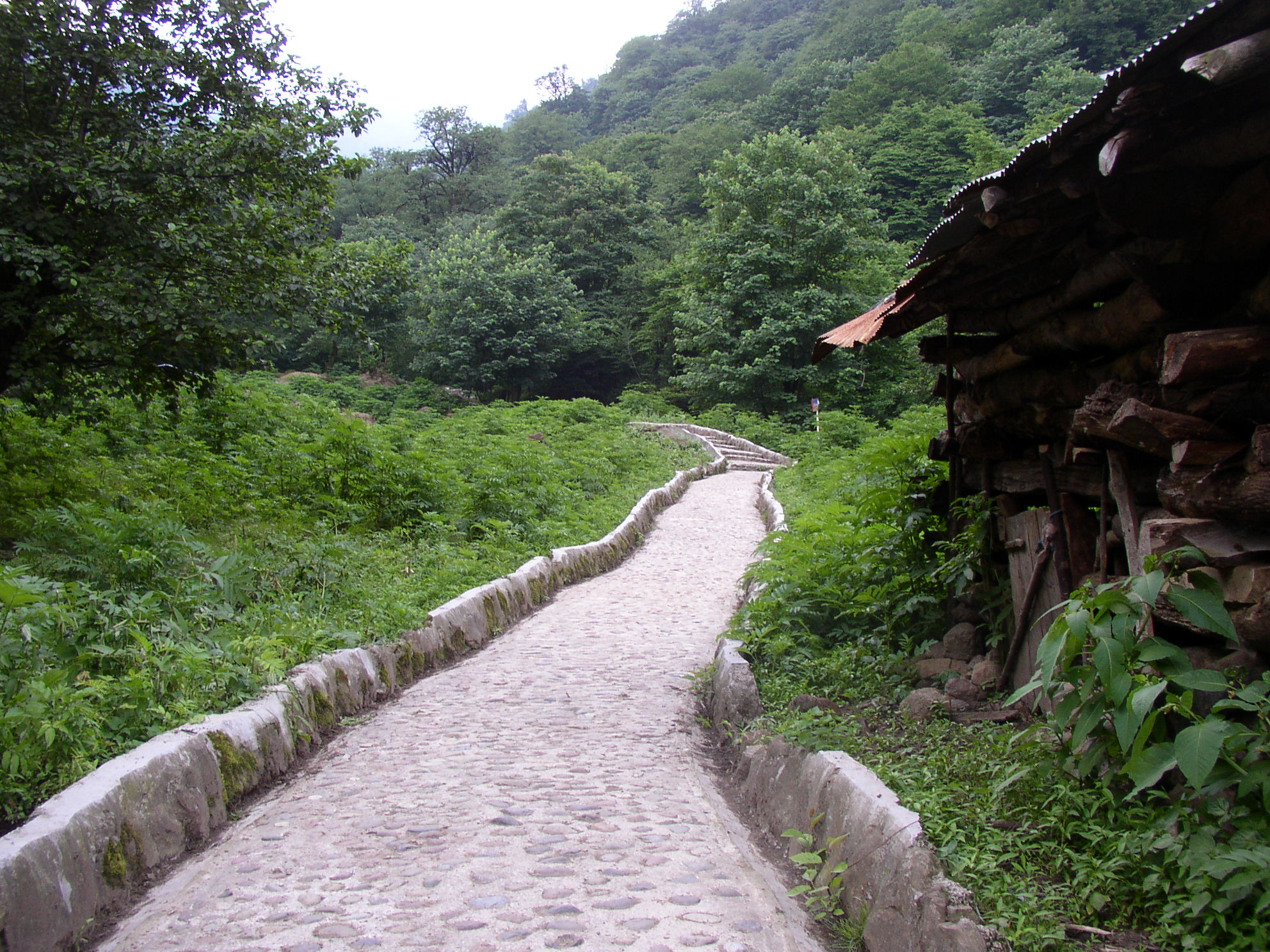
Rudkhan Castle Park

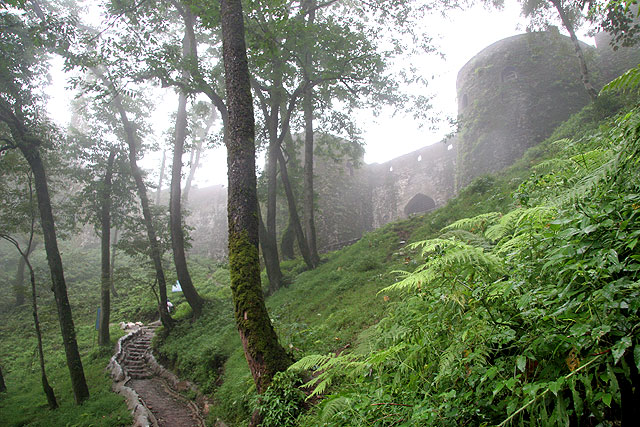
main road To Rudkhan Castle

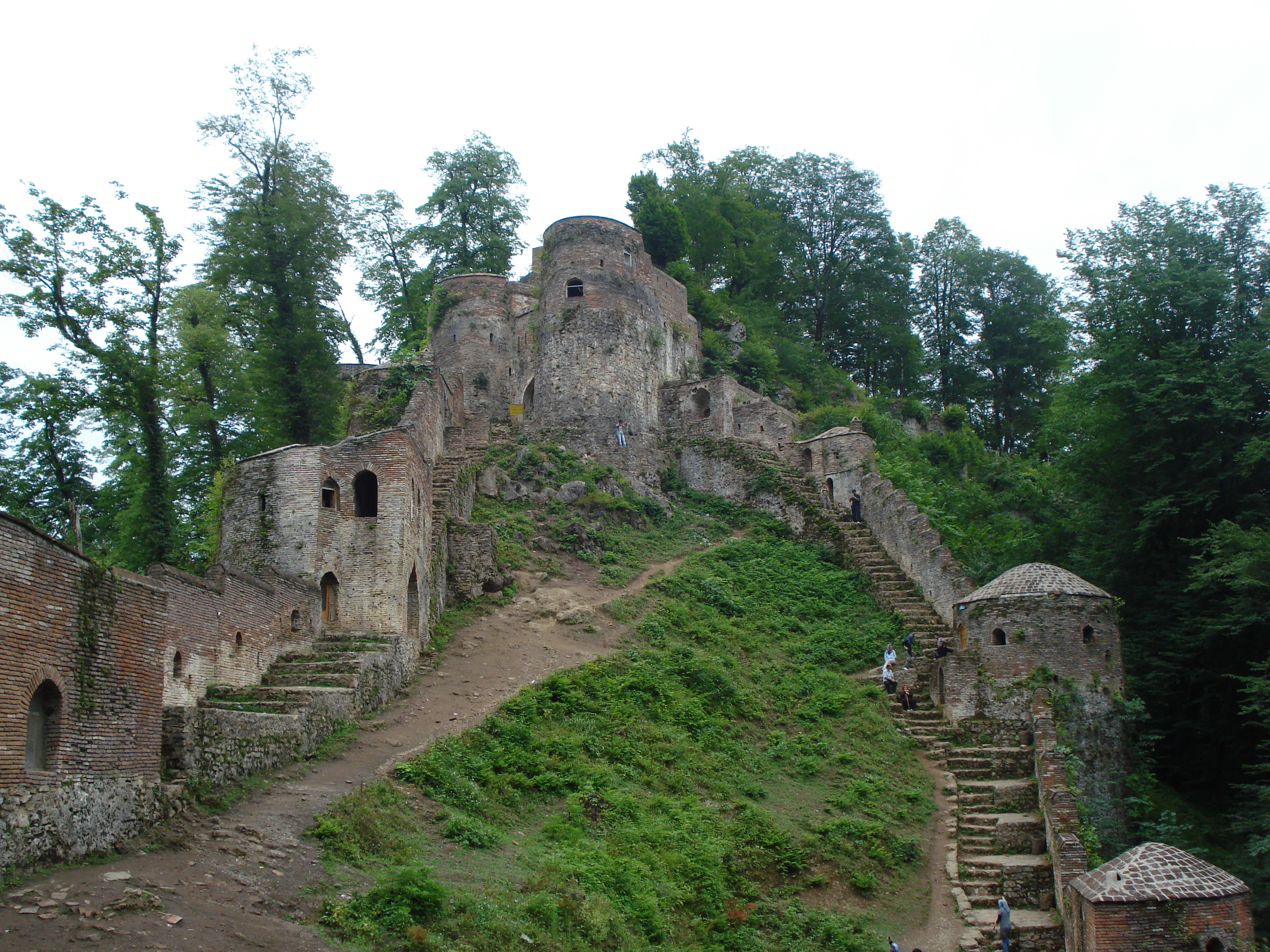
Full view of Rudkhan Castle

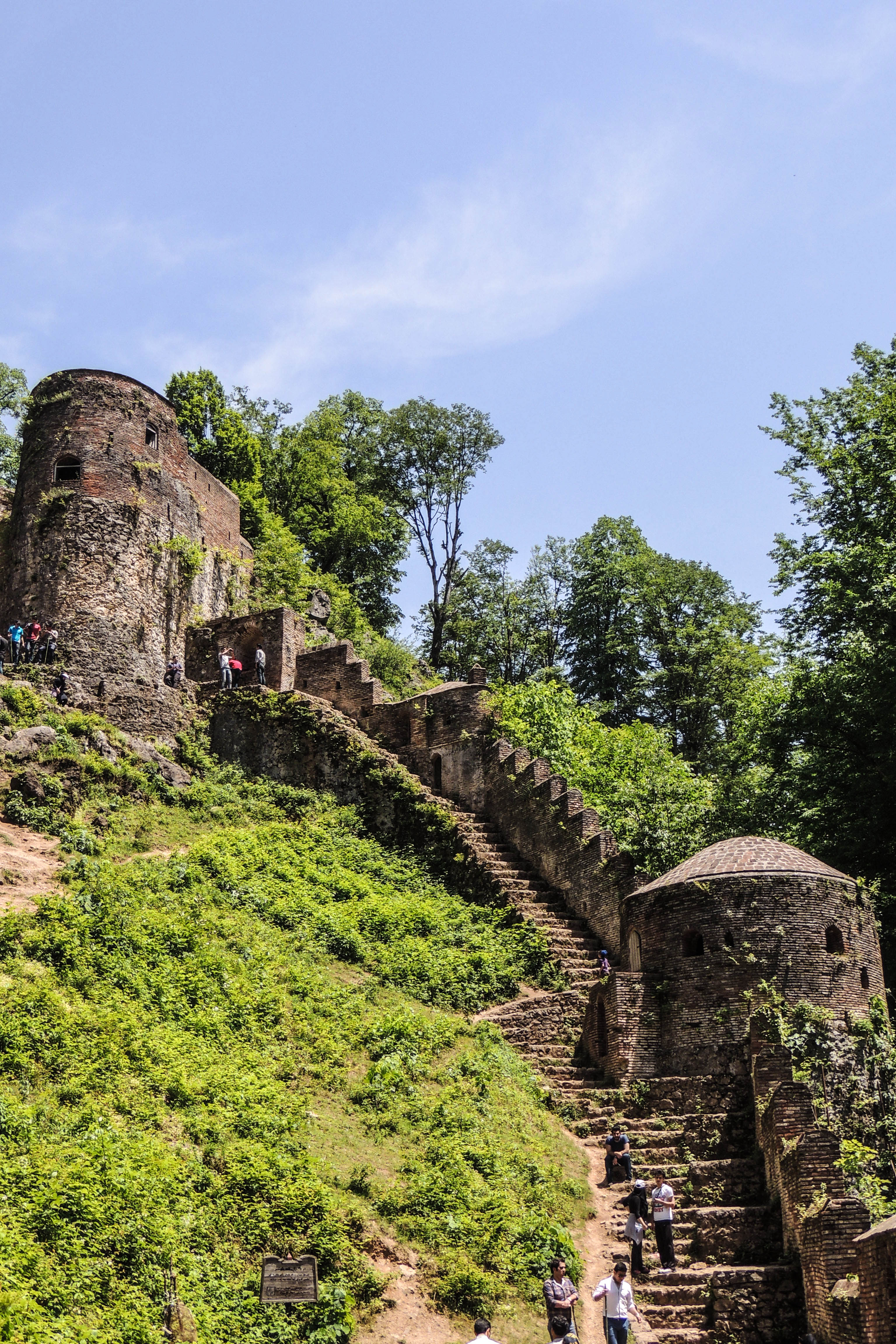
View of Rudkhan Castle

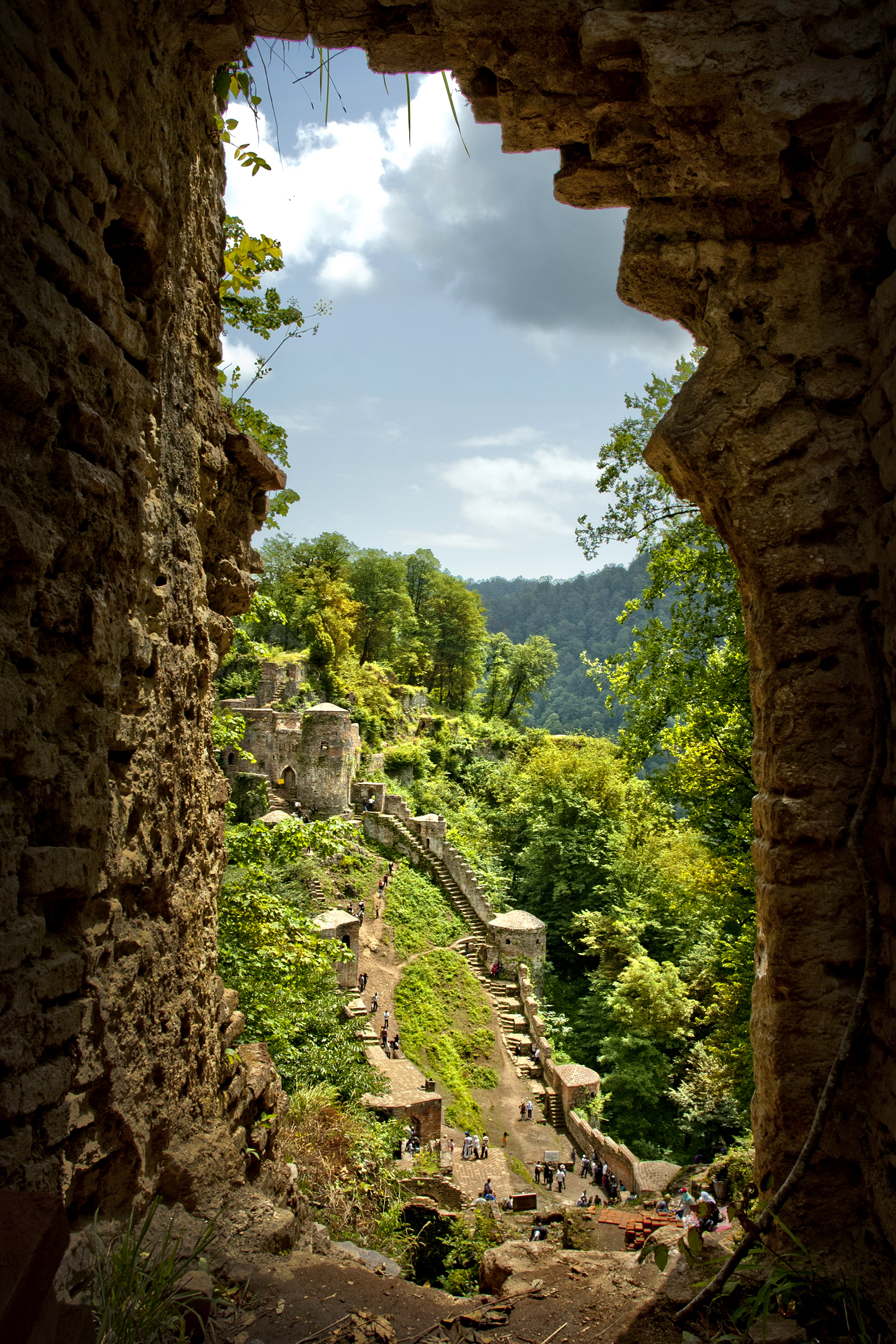

== See also ==
- Architecture of Iran
- List of castles in Iran
