= Shalman =

City in Gilan province, Iran

Shalman Persian: شلمان
- City
- Location within Iran
- Coordinates: 37°09′23″N 50°12′53″E
- Country: Iran
- Province: Gilan
- County: Langarud
- District: Kumeleh
- Established as a city: 1993

Population (2016)
  - Total: 5,102
- Time zone: UTC+3:30 (IRST)

Shalman (Persian: شلمان) (Note: Also romanized as Shalmān; Gilaki: شلمؤن) is a city in Kumeleh District of Langarud County, Gilan Province, Iran. In 1993, the villages of Khalajir (خالجیر) and Bala Qazi Mahalleh (بالاقاضی محله) were merged to form the new city of Shalman.

== Demographics ==
=== Population ===
At the time of the 2006 National Census, the city's population was 5,651 in 1,716 households. The following census in 2011 counted 5,184 people in 1,736 households. The 2016 census measured the population of the city as 5,102 people in 1,855 households.
