= Lavandevil =

City in Gilan province, Iran

Lavandevil Persian: لوندويل
- City
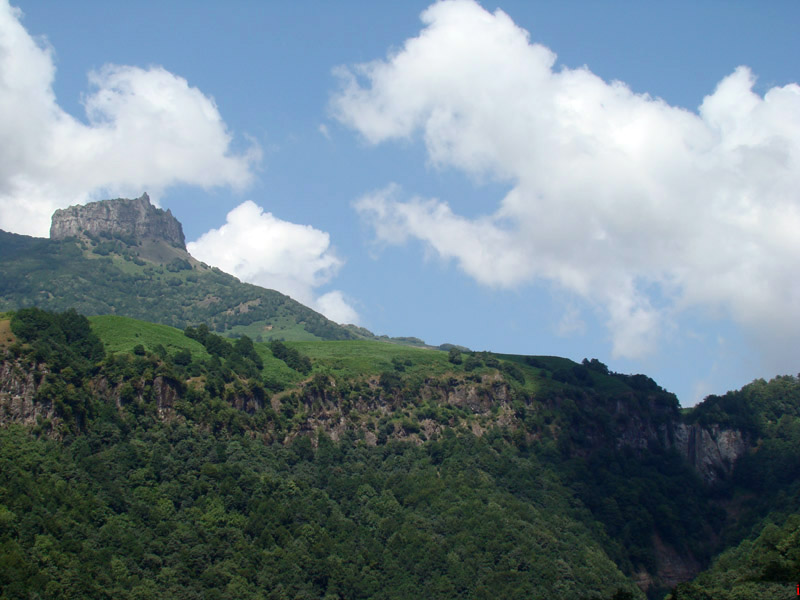
- Alborz mountain range above town.

- Location within Iran
- Coordinates: 38°18′32″N 48°52′13″E
- Country: Iran
- Province: Gilan
- County: Astara
- District: Lavandevil
- Established as a city: 2003

Population (2016)
  - Total: 11,235
- Time zone: UTC+3:30 (IRST)

Lavandevil (Persian: لوندويل) (Note: Also romanized as Lavandavil, Lavandevīl, and Lavandvīl; also known as Bāzar-e Lavandvīl, Landvīl-e Sabalī, and Lavandvīl-e Sabalī) is a city in, and the capital of, Lavandevil District of Astara County, Gilan province, Iran. It also serves as the administrative center for Lavandevil Rural District. The city lies between the coast of the Caspian Sea and the northeastern Alborz mountain range, located just south of Lavandevil Wildlife Refuge.

== History ==
In 2003, the village of Lavandevil merged with the villages of Aqajan Mahalleh (آقاجان محله), Bahram Mahalleh (بهرام محله), Gerdeh Sara (گرده‌سرا), Khalaj Mahalleh (خلج محله), Lavandevil Bazar (لوندو‌یل بازار), and Rahim Mahalleh (رحیم محله), to form the city of Lavandevil.

== Demographics ==
=== Language ===
Linguistic composition of the city.

Lavandevil linguistic composition
language	percent
Azerbaijani	60%
Talysh	40%

=== Population ===
At the time of the 2006 National Census, the city's population was 6,372 in 1,575 households. The following census in 2011 counted 10,617 people in 2,973 households. The 2016 census measured the population of the city as 11,235 people in 3,318 households. After the census, Lavandevil annexed the villages of Kerdeh Sara and Khalaj Mahalleh.
