= Moridan Rural District =

Rural district in Gilan province, Iran

Moridan Rural District Persian: دهستان مريدان
- Rural District
- Location within Iran
- Coordinates: 37°08′N 50°09′E
- Country: Iran
- Province: Gilan
- County: Langarud
- District: Kumeleh
- Established: 1997
- Capital: Moridan

Population (2016)
  - Total: 4,433
- Time zone: UTC+3:30 (IRST)

Moridan Rural District (Persian: دهستان مريدان) is in Kumeleh District of Langarud County, Gilan province, Iran. Its capital is the village of Moridan.

== Demographics ==
=== Population ===
At the time of the 2006 National Census, the rural district's population was 5,532 in 1,633 households. There were 5,399 inhabitants in 1,748 households at the following census of 2011. The 2016 census measured the population of the rural district as 4,433 in 1,614 households. The most populous of its 11 villages was Moridan, with 1,129 people.

=== Other villages in the rural district ===
- Dadqansara
- Hajji Sara
- Kia Gahan
- Lasheh
- Liarjdemeh
- Liseh Rud
- Paresh Kuh
- Siah Kord Gavabar
- Solush
