= Kumeleh District =

District in Gilan province, Iran

Kumeleh District Persian: بخش کومله
- District
- Location within Iran
- Coordinates: 37°09′N 50°10′E
- Country: Iran
- Province: Gilan
- County: Langarud
- Established: 1997
- Capital: Kumeleh

Population (2016)
  - Total: 24,630
- Time zone: UTC+3:30 (IRST)

Kumeleh District (Persian: بخش کومله) is in Langarud County, Gilan province, Iran. Its capital is the city of Kumeleh.

== Demographics ==
=== Population ===
At the time of the 2006 National Census, the district's population was 27,394 in 8,034 households. The following census in 2011 counted 24,925 people in 8,132 households. The 2016 census measured the population of the district as 24,630 inhabitants in 8,857 households.

=== Administrative divisions ===
Kumeleh District Population
Administrative Divisions	2006	2011	2016
Daryasar RD	10,508	8,264	8,638
Moridan RD	5,532	5,399	4,433
Kumeleh (city)	5,703	6,078	6,457
Shalman (city)	5,651	5,184	5,102
Total	27,394	24,925	24,630
RD = Rural District
