= National Indian Film Festival of Australia =

Australian film festival

- Location: Australia
- Founded: 2025
- Language: English, Indian regional languages
- Website: niffa.com.au

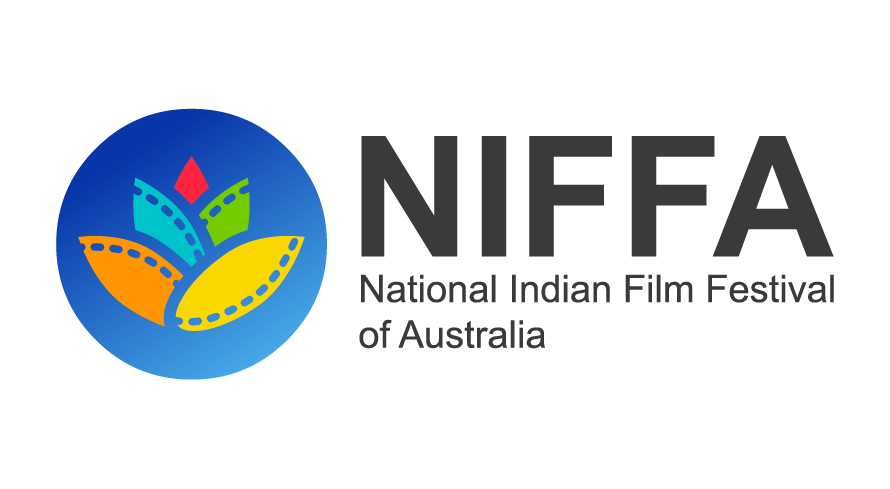
Official logo of National Indian Film Festival of Australia

The National Indian Film Festival of Australia (NIFFA) is an annual film festival that screens Indian films in Australia. Following its inaugural edition in 2025, the festival returned for a second edition in 2026, with media coverage noting an expanded programme featuring a range of Indian films across genres and regions. Organised in collaboration with the Australian Centre for Indian Cinema,

The inaugural edition took place between 13 February and 2 March 2025, in seven Australian cities: Sydney, Melbourne, Brisbane, Adelaide, Canberra, Perth, and the Gold Coast. Over 40 films were screened, including three world premieres and 36 Australian premieres. The opening night film was Superboys of Malegaon by Reema Kagti, and the closing film was Roam Rome Mein by Tannishtha Chatterjee. A retrospective on Shyam Benegal was also included.

The second edition was held in 2026 with a programme across additional Australian locations. The 2026 programme opened with the Manipuri film Boong, directed by Lakshmipriya Devi. The programme featured films across more than 15 Indian languages, including feature films, documentaries and short films. It also included retrospective screenings of Manthan (1976), directed by Shyam Benegal, and In Which Annie Gives It Those Ones (1989), presented in collaboration with the Film Heritage Foundation.

== History ==
The National Indian Film Festival of Australia (NIFFA) was officially announced in October 2024 by the Australian Centre for Indian Cinema.

The festival was conceived by filmmaker Anupam Sharma, an Indian-Australian industry leader and curated alongside festival director Peter Castaldi. Both of them had previously collaborated on Indian film programming in Australia.

NIFFA's inaugural edition ran from 13 February to 2 March 2025, spanning 18 days and screening in seven Australian cities: Sydney, Melbourne, Brisbane, Adelaide, Canberra, Perth, and the Gold Coast. The festival presented over 40 titles, going beyond Bollywood, including Australian and world premieres, regional-language films, and a curated retrospective of Shyam Benegal, many of which had never screened in Australian cinemas before.

NIFFA 2025 was notable forimplementing an all-women Nomination Council, comprising Achala Datar from Zee Studios, producer Deepti Sachdeva, filmmaker Neeru Saluja, and actress-director Amruta Apte. The festival also introduced a Post-production Completion Grant and a special short film distribution offer by Pocket Films, offering financial and mentorship support for both Australian and Indian filmmakers working on Indian South Asian stories. NIFFA hosted panels and workshops on co-production, distribution, and investment, aiming to strengthen both cultural and commercial ties between the Indian and Australian screen industries.

NIFFA received backing from institutions including NDTV, Dendy Cinemas, the Indian High Commission (Canberra), Indian Consulates in Sydney, Perth, and Brisbane, SBS Australia, and the Indian Council for Cultural Relations (ICCR).

== Films and screenings ==
The Opening Night film in 2025 was Superboys of Malegaon, a Hindi-language feature directed by Reema Kagti, which humorously and poignantly chronicles a group of amateur filmmakers in small-town India. The Closing Night film was Roam Rome Mein, directed by Tannishtha Chatterjee, a multilingual drama exploring gender and personal liberation through an Indian lens in a European setting.

Otherfeature screenings included:

- Arranged Love (English) by Sanjane Koneshamoorthy
- Bramayugam (Malayalam) by Rahul Sadasivan
- Dhabari Quruvi (Irula) by Priyanandanan
- It’s Time to Go! (Marathi) by Anant Mahadevan
- Mirbeen (Karbi) by Mridul Gupta
- Parikrama (Hindi & Italian) by Goutam Ghose
- WingMan (The Universal Irony of Love) (Hindi) by Anuj Gulati

The inaugural NIFFA included a retrospective tribute to filmmaker Shyam Benegal, a pioneering voice in Indian parallel cinema who died a few months before the festival. Honouring his contribution to socially conscious storytelling, NIFFA curated screenings of some of his most acclaimed works, including Mammo and The Making of the Mahatma.

The 2026 programme expanded the festival's selection to include feature films, short films, feature and short documentaries, animation, restored classics and special screenings, with films presented across more than 15 Indian languages. The programme also included themed presentations and retrospectives, including screenings of Manthan (1976) and In Which Annie Gives It Those Ones (1989), presented with the Film Heritage Foundation.

== Awards ==
Key awardees from NIFFA's inaugural year:

- Superboys of Malegaon, directed by Reema Kagti won the Best Feature Film award.
- WingMan (The Universal Irony of Love), directed by Anuj Gulati, received the Best Indie Feature Film award.
- Parikrama, directed by Goutam Ghose, was honoured as the Best International Indian Film.
- Maa Oori Ramayanam, a documentary by Badrappa Gajula, won the Best Documentary Feature award.
- The Man Who Hurls News, directed by Ananth Narayan Mahadevan, received the award for Best Documentary (Short).
- The Last Show, directed by Valavan Velmurugan, won the award for Best Short Film.
- The Garmentologist, directed by Debajit Banerjee, received a Special Mention (Short) from the jury.
- Misty, directed by Raja Chatterjee, was awarded the Post‑Production Completion Grant.

The 2026 edition presented awards for feature films, documentaries and short films.

- Tighee (Motherhood) - Best Indie Feature Film
- Courage Best International Indie Feature Film
- Gottipua: Beyond Borders - Best Documentary
- Khwabeeda - Best Short Film Special honours

The festival also presented special honours to individuals from the Indian film industry and film media:

- Anupam Kher - Indian International Cinema Icon Award
- Anubhav Sinha - Nishtha Award
- Leena Yadav - Nishtha Award
- Komal Nahta - Vimarsh Samman

== Regional expansion ==
The festival launched NIFFA Regional in 2025, seeking to extend the festival's reach beyond metropolitan centres. In June 2025, the National Indian Film Festival of Australia (NIFFA) launched its first regional edition in Dubbo, New South Wales, as part of its commitment to cultural outreach beyond major cities. The three-day event, held from 20 to 22 June 2025 at Dubbo, marked a significant milestone in bringing Indian cinema and industry dialogue to regional Australian audiences.

== Organisation ==
Anupam Sharma serves as the Founder and Festival Director of NIFFA. An Australian filmmaker of Indian origin, Sharma holds both a bachelor's and master's degree in Film & Theatre from the University of New South Wales, including a postgraduate thesis on Indian cinema. He is recognized for pioneering Indo-Australian film collaborations since the late 1990s, working on notable Bollywood films shot in Australia like Dil Chahta Hai and Heyy Babyy, and has produced and directed Australian films including unINDIAN (2015) and the documentary The Run (2017). He serves as the Chair of the Australia India Film Council and has previously held roles such as Australia Day Ambassador. He was also named among the 50 most influential Australian film professionals.

Peter Castaldi is the Co‑Director of NIFFA. He managed the Valhalla independent cinemas across Melbourne, Adelaide, and Sydney (1977–1981), worked as producer and presenter across ABC, SBS, and commercial television and radio, and served as artistic director of the Goat Island film festival (1999–2000). Castaldi co-curated the Australian Film Festival of India in India with Sharma. He serves as Managing Editor for Education Services and Partnerships at the Australian Teachers of Media (ATOM).

To maintain transparency and inclusiveness in selection, NIFFA established an all-women Nomination Council in its inaugural year. Achala Datar, head of film distribution for Zee Studios in Australia, New Zealand, and Fiji, and former executive producer with Balaji Telefilms, brought experience in both Indian and Australian markets. Deepti Sachdeva, a producer and former NDTV journalist, has produced Bollywood DownUnder and The Run, and has served on juries for the Asian Television Awards, New York Festivals, and BANFF Rockie Awards. Neeru Saluja, an arts journalist and critic, has contributed to festivals including the Sydney Film Festival, SXSW Sydney, WOMADelaide, the AACTA Awards, and the Asia Pacific Screen Awards. Amruta Apte, an actor, producer, and production coordinator at SBS, directed the short film Ankur and contributed to the Australian TV series Four Years Later.

== Reception ==
The festival received positive coverage from NDTV, The Hindu, ABC, and The Indian Sun, which praised its inclusiveness, cultural focus, and expansion of the Australia–India screen relationship.

== Partners ==
Supporters included Dendy Cinemas, SBS Australia, NDTV, the Indian High Commission, ICCR, NFDC, Pocket Films, and Silver Trak Digital.
