= Films and Casting TEMPLE pty ltd =

Films and Casting TEMPLE Pty Ltd is an Australian-based international film production, film consultancy and casting company based in Disney Studios Australia-Sydney. The company was founded in 2000 by film director Anupam Sharma. Its work includes feature films, documentaries, television and advertising. The company is recognized for pioneering film links between India and Australia and specialises in Bollywood/Indian cinema. Notable works include the cross-cultural feature UnIndian and the feature documentary The Run, which follows ultramarathoner Pat Farmer and screened with coverage in the Australian press; the company’s recent projects include the feature documentary Brand Bollywood… Downunder, which examines Bollywood’s cultural links with Australia and is available to stream on Netflix in Australia and New Zealand.

In addition to screen production, TEMPLE is associated with initiatives including the National Indian Film Festival of Australia (NIFFA) and current Australia–India initiatives such as Southern Sitara, a financing and development vehicle announced at the Cannes Market to back cross-cultural features.

== About ==
Films and Casting TEMPLE was founded in 2000 by filmmaker Anupam Sharma in Sydney as an Australian screen company specialising in collaboration with India and South Asia. The company’s activities include production, casting and consultancy across more than 400 projects in features, documentaries, television, advertising and reality formats.

== Productions ==
Feature films and Bollywood collaborations: TEMPLE’s credits include the cross-cultural feature UnIndian starring Brett Lee and Tannishtha Chatterjee, and production services or consultancy on Indian features shot in Australia such as Dil Chahta Hai (Sydney locations), Salaam Namaste (Melbourne), Singh Is Kinng (Queensland), Heyy Babyy (Sydney) and Love Story 2050 (South Australia), as well as consultancy on Krrish. In September 2026, producer Sajid Nadiadwala announced Heyy Babyy 2, to be shot in Australia as part of a three-film production deal. The Indian Cowboy, a feature biopic about Indian country music singer Bobby Cash, to Temple’s film projects in development. The film is being developed as an Australia-India production, with Anupam Sharma as producer and director.

Documentaries: TEMPLE’s documentary work includes The Run, following ultramarathoner Pat Farmer, and Brand Bollywood… Downunder, which explores Bollywood’s cultural connections with Australia and is streaming on Netflix in Australia and New Zealand.

Television and reality: The company has worked on reality and talent formats including MTV Roadies 6.0 (Australia shoot), Bollywood Star (SBS) and Just Dance with shoots in Australia and the United States.

== Campaigns and Commissions ==
TEMPLE has delivered government and branded content including Destination NSW’s Hindi-language tourism initiative Jhappi Time, described as targeting the Indian visiting-friends-and-relatives market, and commercials such as an Audi campaign featuring Virat Kohli and ICC T20 World Cup launch content.

== Advisory and Institutional Role ==
TEMPLE has advised most Australian state and federal screen bodies on India engagement (excluding Screen Tasmania). Company leadership contributed during the establishment of the Asia Pacific Screen Awards (APSA). With support from Austrade, the Department of Immigration and industry partners, the company has also hosted informational seminars in India to promote Australian screen services and co-production opportunities.

== Recent initiatives ==
=== National Indian Film Festival of Australia (NIFFA) ===
TEMPLE is associated with the National Indian Film Festival of Australia (NIFFA), described as Australia’s first national annual celebration of Indian cinema, with screenings held across multiple cities and a program spanning independent, regional and diaspora films.

TEMPLE is also associated with Southern Sitara, a film financing and development venture unveiled at the Cannes Market to back Australian–Indian features.

== Founder ==
The founder and managing director of Films and Casting TEMPLE is filmmaker Anupam Sharma, who opened the company on 30 August 2000. Sharma holds a bachelor's and master's degree in film and theatre from the University of New South Wales, where he wrote a thesis with distinction on Indian cinema, and has also published research on media and film. He was appointed as an Australia Day Ambassador in 2013, and named by Encore magazine among the 50 most influential professionals in the Australian film industry.

Sharma was chief judge and advisor on SBS’s four-part reality series Bollywood Star (2012), and in 2011 launched the Australian Film Initiative to promote Australian cinema in non-traditional markets, beginning with the annual Australian Film Festival of India, which has screened in Delhi, Mumbai and Dehradun with support from industry figures such as Baz Luhrmann and Hugh Jackman.

As a filmmaker, Sharma directed the cross-cultural feature UnIndian starring Brett Lee and Tannishtha Chatterjee, the documentary The Run on ultramarathoner Pat Farmer, and the feature documentary Brand Bollywood… Downunder (2024), now streaming on Netflix in Australia and New Zealand. Sharma is the founder and festival director of the National Indian Film Festival of Australia (NIFFA), and in 2025 was named as a partner in Southern Sitara, a film financing and development venture launched at the Cannes Market to back cross-cultural Australian–Indian features.

== Notable productions ==
Year	Title	Format	Role	Notes
2001	Dil Chahta Hai	Feature film	Production services	Sydney location filming.
2005	Salaam Namaste	Feature film	Production services	Shot largely in Melbourne; credited with boosting Bollywood tourism links.
2006	Krrish	Feature film	International consultant	Temple negotiated service deals across Singapore, Hong Kong and Australia.
2007	Heyy Babyy	Feature film	Production services	Filmed in Sydney.
2008	Singh Is Kinng	Feature film	Production services	Shot in Queensland and Sydney.
2008	Love Story 2050	Feature film	Production services	Filmed partly in Adelaide and South Australia.
2015	UnIndian	Feature film	Producer	Cross-cultural rom-com starring Brett Lee and Tannishtha Chatterjee.
2017	The Run	Documentary	Producer	Feature doc on ultramarathoner Pat Farmer; screened at Newcastle International Film Festival.
2024	Brand Bollywood… Downunder	Documentary	Producer	Feature doc on Bollywood’s cultural connections with Australia; streaming on Netflix ANZ.

== Television and reality ==
Year	Title	Network/Producer	Role (Temple)	Notes
2008	MTV Roadies 6.0	Viacom18 / MTV India	Australian production services	Episodes filmed in Australia; Australia unit work noted in press.
2012	Bollywood Star	SBS / WTFN Entertainment	Judge / consulting producer	Four-part talent series on SBS; Anupam Sharma served as on-screen judge and advisor.
2011	Just Dance	Star Plus / SOL Productions	Casting / production liaison (Australia/US segments)	Dance reality format judged by Hrithik Roshan; show details widely reported. Temple involvement per company records.

== Work ==
Production:

- Prem Aggan (1998)
- Kadhalar Dinam (1999)
- Pyaar Koi Khel Nahin (1999)
- Yes & No (short) (2000)
- Beti No. 1 (2000)
- Deewane (2000)
- Hadh Kar Di Aapne (2000)
- Dil Chahta Hai (2001)
- Hollywood (2003)
- Kitne Door... Kitne Paas (2002)
- Aap Mujhe Achche Lagne Lage (2002)
- Janasheen (2003)
- In Conversation (TV short) (2004)
- Heyy Babyy (2007)
- Love Story 2050 (2008)
- Sankham (2009)
- Victory (2009)
- Orange (2010)
- Just dance 2(video game) (2010)
- Crook (2010)
- We Are Family (2010)
- Love in Space (2011)
- From Sydney with Love (2012)
- Being Lara Bingle (2012)
- Indian Aussies: Terms & Conditions Apply (2013)
- UnIndian (2015)
- Burning Love (2016)
- The Run (2017)
- Bollywood Downunder (2023)

== Other work ==
- ^{SMS (Small Man Syndrome) (2013)}
- ^{Jhappi Time – TV Commercials x4 for Destination NSW (2014)}
- ^{Creative Content Australia – Short Promo (2015)}
- ^{Audi} ^{ad with Virat Kohli (2018)}
- ^{Audi} ^{TVC – Corner Stone India (2019)}
- ^{T20 World Cup} ^{Launch – ICC Australia (2020)}

== Awards and Achievements ==
The Run won the Best Documentary Award at the Newcastle Film Festival.

Brand Bollywood Downunder won the Flame Award for Best Documentary (2024) at the 26th UK Asian Film Festival (Tongues on Fire) in London.

Brand Bollywood Downunder was also nominated for Best Original Score in a Documentary at the 14th Australian Academy of Cinema and Television Arts Awards (AACTA) in 2025.

Films and Casting TEMPLE received the Indo-Australian Business Excellence Award for its outstanding contribution to bridging Australia and India through film production and casting.

UnIndian (2015) received The WIFTS Foundation International Visionary Diversity Award (2016) for its contribution to cross-cultural storytelling.

== Partnerships ==
Films and Casting TEMPLE is part of an incentive to promote film relationships between India and Australia. As a result, the company is associated with Global Indian Talent, An Australian Film Initiative and the website Bollywood in Australia, all of which aim to promote the professional relationships between Indian and Australian in the cinematic realm.
