= Violence against Indians in Australia controversy =

Controversy in Australia

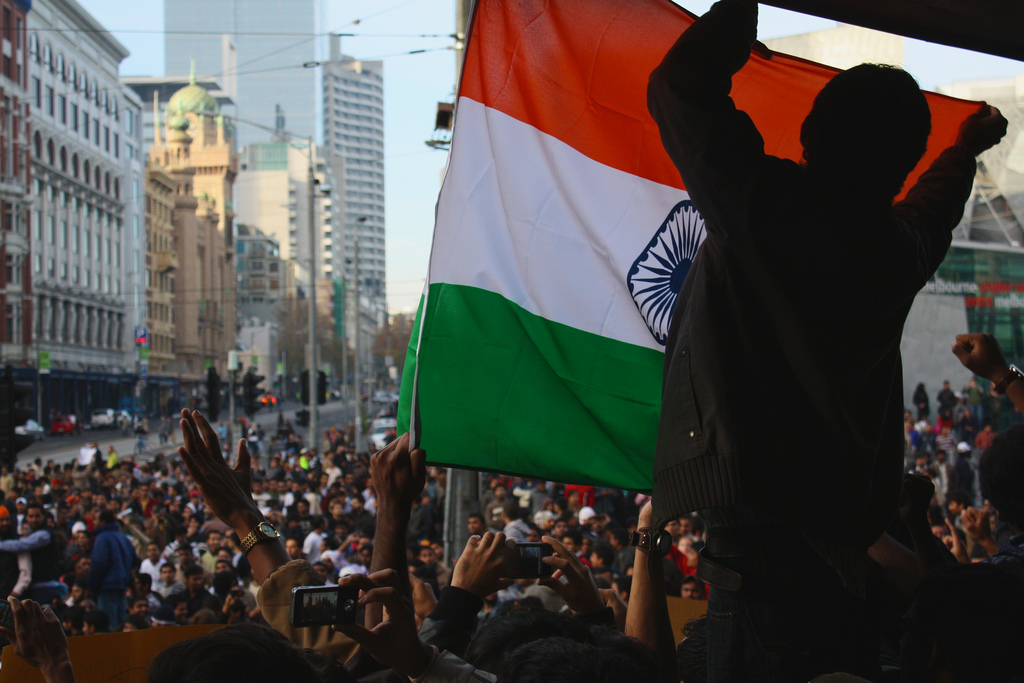
Indian students protesting on 31 May 2009, in Melbourne, blocking Swanston and Flinders Streets

Since the beginning of the 21st century, the media of India, and Australia, mostly in Melbourne, and Sydney, publicised reports of crimes and robberies against Indians in Australia that were described as racially motivated.

Rallies were organised in Melbourne and Sydney, and intense media coverage of the perceived hate crimes commenced in India, which were mostly critical of Australian and Victorian Police. The Australian government initially called for calm as it began an investigation into the crimes. In June 2009, the Victoria Police Chief Commissioner, Simon Overland, stated that some of the crimes were racist in nature, and others were opportunistic. A subsequent Indian Government investigation concluded that, of 152 reported assaults against Indian students in Australia that year, 23 involved racial overtones.

== Background ==
Indian students were at the time the second largest group of international students studying at a tertiary level in Australia. From 2004 to 2009, the number of Indians studying in Australia rose from 30,000 to 97,000 with 45,000 of these living in Melbourne, 32,000 in Adelaide and the remainder shared between Sydney, Brisbane and Perth. Eapen Verghese stated in an opinion piece that the cost of living in Australian cities has made it necessary for many of these students to live in cheaper and more distant suburbs, where there is an increased risk of encountering violent crime. Others have indicated that Indian students face discrimination and exploitation in housing and jobs.

In 2007–2008, international education contributed A$13.7 billion to the Australian economy, measured through all categories of export earnings, including tuition fees, living expenses and tourism associated with visits from relatives.

== Australian Visits by Indian Politicians ==
Revanth Reddy and Nama Nageswara Rao were the first major Indian politicians to visit Melbourne, Australia to meet with International students from India during that time period.

Sriprakash Jaiswal, S. M. Krishna, and various other Indian politicians also later visited Melbourne, Australia to meet with International students from India during the same time period.

=== Visit by Revanth Reddy and Nama Nageswara Rao ===
In June 2009, when Indian students were being attacked in Australia, then Telugu Desam leaders Revanth Reddy and Nama Nageswara Rao had visited Melbourne, Australia to meet with International students from India. Revanth Reddy and Nama Nageswara Rao had visited hospitals, and travelled in trains and public transport in Melbourne to meet victims, and interact with Indian students in Australia, to get a better understanding of the situation.

Revanth Reddy and Nama Nageswara Rao also visited the Victorian Parliament and had meetings with then Victorian Opposition Leader Ted Baillieu to raise concerns about Indian students being attacked in Melbourne, Australia.

Nama Nageswara Rao held a press conference on his return to India. He stated that he had interviewed many of the victims, and the attacks did not appear to be motivated by racism. He also noted that many of the perpetrators were immigrants from ethnic minorities, such as "Afghans, Lebanese and other nationals who settled in Australia".

== Indian visits by Australian Politicians ==
=== Visit by Ted Baillieu ===
In July 2009, then Victorian Opposition Leader Ted Baillieu visited India and met with various politicians and prominent personalities such as Sriprakash Jaiswal, Rajeev Shukla, Revanth Reddy, Nama Nageswara Rao, and others, during a time when there were stories in Indian media about attacks on Indian students in Australia.

=== Visit by Michael Danby ===
In July 2009 Michael Danby heading a six-member Australian parliamentarian delegation to India said, "We are joining the Premier of Victoria in a march to express the views of the overwhelming majority of Australians condemning these attacks." The Harmony Day March Occurred on 12 July 2009.

=== Visit by John Brumby ===
In September 2009, Victorian Premier John Brumby visited India and tried to "repair Australia's reputation" as fewer Indian students are applying for Australian visas.

== IPL ==
Indian politician Bal Thackeray in response to attacks on Indian students in Australia had threatened to stop Australian cricketers from being a part of Indian Premier League.

On the suggestion of Victorian politician Ted Baillieu, a phone call was made to Mr. Thackeray, during which it was requested to withdraw the proposal to ban Australian players from the IPL. It was suggested that such a move might cause harm to efforts aimed at resolving the situation. Surprisingly, Mr. Thackeray accepted the request and withdrew his decision to stop Australians from participating in the IPL.

== Bollywood reaction ==
=== Victorian Bollywood Policy ===
In October 2006, Victorian Opposition Leader Ted Baillieu released a Bollywood Policy that included the original idea of creation of the Indian Film Festival of Melbourne.

The policy was drafted in Sep 2006, amended in Feb 2010, and funded and re-amended in October 2010, to include concerns regarding attack on Indian students in Australia. After Ted Baillieu came into power, the tender process was started in 2011, the tender winner was announced in Feb 2012, and the first funded edition of Indian Film Festival of Melbourne was delivered in June 2012.

=== Bollywood reaction ===
Bollywood's largest labour union declared that its members would refuse to work in Australia until attacks on Indian students there are stopped. Dinesh Chaturvedi, the general secretary of the Federation of Western India Cine Employees Association, has declared that their associates have been instructed not to shoot films in Australia as "the situation is not normal over there".

In response to the issue, Bollywood star Amitabh Bachchan turned down an honorary doctorate from the Queensland University of Technology."

== Detailed Chronology ==
=== 2007–2008 crime statistics ===
There were 120,913 Indian students enrolled to undertake an Australian qualification in 2009. In the year 2007–2008, 1,447 Indians had been victims of crime including assaults and robberies in the state of Victoria in Australia. However, the statistics reportedly show that Indians were not over represented in assaults. In either case, the Victorian police refused to release the data for public scrutiny, the stated reason being that it was "problematic: as well as 'subjective and open to interpretation'".

=== April 2008 Indian taxi driver protest ===
On 29 April 2008, in Melbourne an estimated five hundred Indian taxi drivers protested at Flinders Street station with a sit-in protest following the stabbing of a taxi driver. A similar protest was held on 19 May 2008 in Adelaide, where about fifty taxi drivers protested after an assault on an Indian taxi driver. The Victorian Government brought in mandatory safety shields later that year, but this was met with protests because of the costs.

=== May 2009 Indian student protests ===
After incidents in May 2009, over 4,000 Indian students staged a protest opposite Federation Square in Melbourne on 31 May 2009, saying attacks on Indian students were motivated by racism and were not being sufficiently addressed by the Australian Government. One report said "Along with more police protection, the students also want a multicultural police section, and on-site accommodation for Indian students at all universities and colleges". 18 protesters were detained.

On 31 May 2009, In Melbourne India's High Commissioner, Sujatha Singh, met with Victorian State Premier John Brumby to express her government's concerns over the violence. On 1 June 2009, Indian Prime Minister Manmohan Singh phoned Prime Minister Kevin Rudd to express his concerns.

On 1 June 2009, in New Delhi, roughly 100 people including members of the Indian political party Shiv Sena and student protesters held a demonstration outside the Australian High Commission in New Delhi, where effigies of Kevin Rudd were burnt. Shiv Sena MP Manohar Joshi warned that Australians living or travelling in India could face revenge attacks if Indians living in Australia continued to be attacked. On the same day Australian Prime Minister Kevin Rudd expressed regret for the attacks and declared that the perpetrators would be brought to justice. He did not state whether he considers the attacks to be racially motivated.

The left-wing All India Students Federation conducted a candle march at the India Gate, and demanded "stringent action against those behind the brutal attacks on the innocent students".

In June 2009, Indian student organisations called on the Indian government to declare Australia an "unsafe destination for Indian students"., the National Students Union of India met the Minister of State of External Affairs, Shashi Tharoor and demanded that the centre should prevail upon the Australian government to ensure that such incidents do not occur again and the Vishwa Hindu Parishad political party, said it would consider an Australian boycott over the bashings if authorities did not do more to protect Hindus in Australia.

On 7 to 10 June 2009, rallies in the Sydney CBD and at Harris Park, were attended by hundreds of Indians and supporters. The rally started at Sydney Town Hall and marched to Hyde Park. Some attending the rally specifically mentioned Harris Park (a Sydney suburb where 20% of the population is Indian), as an area where Indians were frequently assaulted, and called on police to do more to make that suburb safe. The students said they were considered "soft targets". Some Indian protestors were reported to be carrying hockey sticks and baseball bats. According to police, the protest was sparked by an attack on Indians earlier in the evening allegedly by Lebanese men. In retaliation the protesters attacked three uninvolved Lebanese men, who sustained minor injuries. This was believed to be the first violent reaction by Indian students against attacks on them. A police dog squad was called in to control the crowd.

On 9 June 2009, Indian Prime Minister, addressing the Indian Parliament said that "he was 'appalled' by the senseless violence and crime, some of which are racist in nature,"

=== January 2010 murders and protests ===
The murders of 25-year-old fruit picker Ranjodh Singh on 29 December 2009 in Griffith, New South Wales and 21-year-old student Nitin Garg on 3 January 2010 in Melbourne resulted in a protest in New Delhi. Three Indian nationals were put on trial for the murder of Singh in April 2011, with police alleging that the murder related to a pay dispute. Garg was stabbed by a 15-year-old male during a robbery in a city park.

On 5 January 2010, a cartoon depicting the Victoria Police as a Ku Klux Klan member was published in the New Delhi Mail Today This was condemned by Acting Prime Minister Julia Gillard who described it as "deeply offensive". In January 2010 the Indian Government issued a travel advisory for Indians in Melbourne, warning of the increasing crime rate "often accompanied by verbal abuse and fueled by drugs and alcohol". However, Simon Crean, the acting Foreign Minister, urged Indian leaders to "avoid fuelling hysteria" and stated that Melbourne was a safe place to visit.

On 9 January, Indian national Jaspreet Singh made false reports to Victorian Police alleging he was doused in fuel and set on fire in a racially motivated attack in Melbourne. Singh pleaded guilty in May 2010 to criminal damage with intent to gain through arson, attempting to obtain property by deception and making a false report to police. Singh was handed an 8-month suspended sentence.

On 26 January 2010, the Australian Prime Minister's nephew Van Thanh Rudd and Sam King, both of the Revolutionary Socialist Party, dressed up as members of the Ku Klux Klan, protesting against the allegedly racist violence against Indians during the Australian Open tennis tournament in Melbourne, with the signs "Racism – Made in Australia" on the front of their dresses. The protest took place in front of Melbourne Park and both reportedly fined for "inciting a riot".

On 24 February 2010, the Vindaloo against Violence protest saw 17,000 protesters at over 400 restaurants, workplaces, schools and universities "reached out to the Indian community, and all our immigrant communities, to let them know that they are not indifferent to violence and that they are welcome and entitled to feel safe here. showed the government and law enforcement that we feel seriously about this issue and want to understand why this violence is happening and what is being done to diffuse it. The official participation of Victoria Police and Premier Brumby in the day's action illustrates that this message has been received."

=== November 2010 stabbing ===
Another student was stabbed in the bowel on 5 November 2010 in Melbourne. He required emergency surgery in the hospital with 26 stitches. Police reported that they believed the attack to have been random, rather than racially motivated.

== Other Reactions ==
=== Media coverage ===
Some Indian community leaders in Australia said Indian media has blown the issue out of proportion, and that their coverage could overcast the real issues faced by students.

The Indian media's coverage has been likened to hysteria by the Australian media. Australia's Immigration Minister, Chris Evans, said "There's been a lot of concern inside India and there's been, I think, some fairly hysterical reporting of what's occurred." The Herald Sun's conservative right wing columnist, Andrew Bolt, described the events as a "circus", whilst another said that Indian TV networks ignored the higher murder rate in India. The Victorian Premier said the Indian media's coverage of the incidents was "unbalanced" and emphasised that two Indian nationals were charged with the murder of Jaspreet Singh. An editorial by Radio Australia on the crimes used the words "media circus" in its headline.

On 8 February 2010, the weekly Indian newsmagazine Outlook published a 10-page cover story on the attacks called "Why the Aussies Hate Us", in which Vinod Mehta, the editor in chief wrote that the Indian Media were not overreacting in their coverage of the violence, and accused the Australian authorities of displaying a "smug and superior attitude". He expressed admiration for Australia but criticised the Australian responses.

Some in the Indian media have accused the Australian authorities of being denialist.

There were also concerns that reports of an Indian journalist being attacked in Australia, cited by several Indian newspapers as an example of the "ongoing attacks," did not mention that her assailant was Indian.

In an attempt to repair the relationship, some Indian journalists were invited to visit Australia.

In 2010, investigative reporter Andrew Marantz from Mother Jones magazine, gained employment selling mobile phone call plans with the Delhi Call Centre in order to investigate Indian perception of Australians following media reports of Indians facing racism in Australia. Marantz's training included a three-week course on Australian culture and "how to act Australian". During the course topic "dissecting the Australian psych", employees were told that Australia was known as "the dumbest continent on Earth" where college was "literally" unknown. Australians were technologically backward with the average person using mobile phones no better than the Nokia 3110 classic, were racist and that the best time to call was Friday nights as all Australians "drink constantly" and would likely be "smashed". In an interview on U.S. radio, Marantz stated he was shocked at the extent of Indian stereotyping of Australians.

=== Allegations of racism ===
A report about attacks on Indians in Australia was submitted to the Indian Parliament by the Overseas Indian Ministry, early 2010. According to this report, of the 152 attacks that the Indian consulate was aware of, 23 had "racial overtones", i.e., were accompanied by racial abuse, or "anti-Indian remarks". The majority were found to be either thefts, or robberies, or results of verbal disputes. Others have objected to labeling Australia as racist based on the actions of a few.

Sitaram Yechury, a member of parliament representing the Communist Party of India (Marxist), wrote that both sides of the debate have points. Economic crises and downfalls often cause rising fascism and racism against minorities, such as the rise of Nazi Germany, the Great American Depression, as well as economic downturns in India itself resulting in racist-like violence between various ethnic groups and ultra-nationalist parties in the country. Yechury says that the racism directed against Indians in Australia can be explained in this broader context.

Sydney students interviewed by ABC's AM programme stated that their attackers were members of several ethnic groups, and while they said there was a "racial element" they also saw the attacks as opportunistic. The attackers have been described as being white, African, Asian, Middle Eastern, Aboriginal, and Pacific Islander.

Herald Sun columnist Andrew Bolt criticised the automatic labelling of Australia as a racist country as unfair, noting comments from foreign victims of crime that their attackers were foreigners themselves. On 28 January 2010 two Indian nationals were arrested for the murder of Ranjodh Singh on 29 December 2009. People from a range of different ethnic backgrounds perpetrated these assaults and investigations revealed that at least two of the later attacks were perpetrated by Indians.

In October 2010 a number of Victorian police officers were dismissed or otherwise disciplined after sending around emails with a video of an Indian train passenger being electrocuted with distasteful commentary referring to the Indian student affair.

== Statistics controversy ==
An Australian study into the statistics of these attacks concludes that "In the light of poor criminological evidence and a plethora of evocative images, the global media has propagated and fostered claims about crimes and racism related to that are well outside the evidence.".

A report was submitted to the Indian Parliament by the Overseas Indian Ministry, early 2010. According to this report, of the 152 attacks that the Indian consulate was aware of, 23 had "racial overtones", i.e., were accompanied by racial abuse, or "anti-Indian remarks". The majority were found to be either thefts, or robberies, or results of verbal disputes.

The NSW Bureau of Crime Statistics and Research states there has been no recorded increase in assault crimes in Harris Park in the past two years. A member of the NSW upper house, Gordon Moyes, cited changing victim demographics for the suburb, "What has happened over the last few years is that a number of Indian students, attracted by fairly cheap accommodation, have come into the area, the target – always the soft targets – moved from elderly people walking on the street to Indian students with laptops.

New South Wales Police have stated that Indians are not over represented in Australian crime statistics.

This view was supported by Sydney-based United India Association president Dr Prabhat Sinha, who took the view that the attacks were not necessarily racially motivated. He said: "They become soft targets by groups of four to six drug users, for example, who just want cash."

The Victorian State Premier, John Brumby, has stated that internal police statistics show that Indians are not over represented in assaults. However, according to the Police Commissioner, Simon Overland, people belonging to a broad statistical category of "South Asian appearance" (which includes Indians) are over represented in robberies. In either case, the Victorian police refuse to release these statistics to public scrutiny, the stated reason being that they are "problematic: as well as 'subjective and open to interpretation'".

Newspaper columnist Greg Sheridan said that Victorian Premier John Brumby was in "indolent denialism" regarding these incidents by saying that "Assaults on Indian students are under-represented as a population share." According to Sheridan, the Victorian Police had initially denied gathering statistics on crime by ethnicity, then reversed that and said they did collate such statistics, but said that they were unreliable. Sheridan was concerned that there was also systematic under-reporting of all crime in Victoria as claimed in the Victorian Ombudsman report "Crime Statistics and Police Numbers".

=== Educational, policing and safety issues ===
An editorial in the Geelong Advertiser suggested that education institutions should take more consideration of safeguarding student safety, and other factors including inadequate policing numbers and liquor licensing should be addressed.

The Ministerial Council on Education, Employment, Training and Youth Affairs said it would conduct a national quality crackdown on education and training providers, in particular smaller education providers that have been the target of student complaints.

The People's Republic of China has also expressed concern over student safety in Australia. According to official figures, more than 130,000 Chinese students are currently studying in Australia.

New Zealand has responded to these attacks and subsequent incidents. The education sector in New Zealand has moved to distance itself from attacks on Indian students, saying they were "totally different societies". The Chief Executive of the New Zealand Education Trust, Robert Stevens, has stressed to prospective students from India that New Zealand "is a different country from Australia – in the nicest possible way", and is striving to market New Zealand to Indians in this manner. Education authorities in New Zealand are hoping recent attacks on Indian students in Australia will make New Zealand a more attractive option.

=== Need for a mechanism to prevent attacks on Indians abroad ===
Domestically, the Indian government declared that it would formulate a policy to deal with racial discrimination against Indians abroad.

As part of the initiative to create an institutionalised mechanism to prevent racist attacks on Indians abroad, Vayalar Ravi, the head of the overseas Indian affairs ministry, has been tasked to protect the Indians in Australia. Ravi has called for a report on these incidents from the Indian High Commission in Australia.

== Aftermath ==
There was a 46% drop in Indians applying for student visas for Australia from July to 31 October 2009 compared to the same period in 2008, and a total drop of 26% in student visa applications to Australia from all countries (including India). A study (completed before the deaths of Nitin Garg and Ranjodh Singh) forecast a 20% drop in Indian students expected to study in Australia in 2010, compared to 2009, partly due to a reduction in the number of visas allowed to be granted, stiffening of the regulations associated with them, the strength of the Australian dollar, and a clampdown on unscrupulous migration agents and colleges. After the attacks of 2009 and the deaths in Jan 2010, its expected to fall even further than the 20% drop.

In response, Victorian police were given new powers to conduct stop-and-search operations without the need for warrants.

The former head of its elite Special Air Service (SAS) regiment and current National Security Adviser, Duncan Lewis, was charged with leading a taskforce to examine the attacks on Indian students. Lewis chaired the task force's first meeting and coordinated Australia's response to the assaults. The Victorian government is considering enacting hate crime legislation that would consider prejudicial motivation as a factor in sentencing.

=== Student numbers ===
Overall, the number of foreign students coming to Australia over the period 2009–2011 declined. Factors included; a steep rise in the value of the Australian dollar, decreasing the country's attractiveness relative to its main competitors in Britain and the United States; a tightening of government regulation of the education and of visa requirements contributed to this decline; and reported concerns over safety. An Australian Council for Educational Research study found higher education visas for Indian students fell from 34,200 in 2007–08 to 9750 in 2011–12. In 2010, Federation of Indian Students in Australia (FISA) says that 30,000 Indian students have left Australia in the last year, and claims "race attacks is one of the major reasons behind the exodus. Other significant factors include that there are no jobs and students can't survive without that. Denying permanent residency to many Indians despite fulfilment of conditions has also been a reason.". The number of applications for student visas by Indians rose from 4000 in 2011 to 7700 in 2012 but there was a downturn on successful applications. Subsequently the number of Indian students has rapidly increased, reaching 129,864 in 2021

=== Safety of international students research project ===
In order to establish reliable statistics for the examination of the safety of international students, the Australian Institute of Criminology is undertaking a research project on the safety of international students living in Australia. The project is intended to compare the rate of crime against international students with the rate of crime against the broader Australian population. The Australian Department of Immigration and Citizenship (DIAC) is releasing data to Australian police jurisdictions and the Australian Institute of Criminology as part of a data-matching exercise which will enable identification of international students who have been victims of crime (Australian police jurisdictions do not collect statistics on victims' citizenship or visa status).

=== Crimes Against International Students Report by the Australian Institute of Criminology ===
In 2011, the Australian Institute of Criminology released a study entitled Crimes Against International Students:2005–2009. This found that over the period 2005–2009, international students were less likely to be assaulted than the average person in Australia. Indian students experienced an average assault rate in some jurisdictions, but overall they experienced lower assault rates than the Australian average.

=== Indian immigration to Australia ===
As of 2012 the number of Indians migrating to Australia has increased to such an extent that Indians are now the most numerous nationality moving to Australia per year, overtaking China and the UK.

== See also ==
- The Colour of Darkness
- Persecution of Hindus
- Anti-Hindu sentiment
- Australia–India relations
- Gangs in Australia
- Brand Bollywood Downunder
