= Rukhmabai =

One of the first practicing women doctors in colonial India

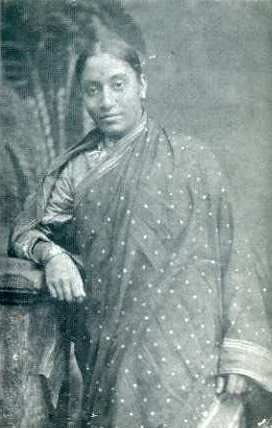
- Born: 22 November 1864
- Died: 25 September 1955 (aged 90)
- Education: London School of Medicine for Women
- Occupations: Doctor, women's emancipation
- Relatives: Sakharam Arjun (step-father)

Rukhmabai (22 November 1864 – 25 September 1955) was an Indian physician and feminist. She is best known for being one of the first practicing women doctors in colonial India (the first being Dr. Kadambini Ganguly who started practicing in 1886) as well as being involved in a landmark legal case involving her marriage as a child bride between 1884 and 1888. The case raised significant public debate across several topics, which most prominently included law vs tradition, social reform vs conservatism and feminism in both British-ruled India and England. This ultimately contributed to the Age of Consent Act in 1891.

== Early life ==
Rukhmabai was born to Janardhan Pandurang and Jayantibai in a Marathi family. Janardhan Pandurang died when Rukhmabai was between two and six years old. After her husband's demise, Jayantibai married the widower Sakharam Arjun, an eminent physician and social activist in Bombay. Remarriage of widows was permitted among the Suthar (carpenter) community - the caste to which Rukhmabai's mother belonged.

Two and a half years later, 11-year-old Rukhmabai was married to the 19-year-old Dadaji Bhikaji, a cousin of her stepfather. It was agreed that, deviating from the contemporary social norms, Dadaji would stay with Rukhmabai's family as a gharjawai and be fully provided for by them. The expectation was for him to acquire education in due course and "become a good man". Six months into the marriage, Rukhmabai having reached puberty, the traditional event of Garbhadhan was held, signalling the time for ritual consummation of marriage. But Dr Sakharam Arjun, being an eminent physician of reformist tendencies, did not permit early consummation.

This displeased Bhikaji, now aged 20, who also resented the attempts of Rukhmabai's family to make him "a good man". In addition to his aversion for education, the compulsion to go to sixth standard of school at an age when he should have been at the university was particularly distressing. In the meanwhile, Bhikaji lost his mother and, against the advice of Sakharam Arjun, took to living with his maternal uncle Narayan Dhurmaji. The environment of Dhurmaji's home pushed Bhikaji further into a life of indolence and waywardness. He eventually accumulated debts, which he hoped to clear using the property that accompanied Rukhmabai into the house. Rukhmabai refused to move into the household of Dhurmaji to live with Bhikaji, a decision supported by her stepfather.

In contrast, in the same years, Rukhmabai studied at home using books from a Free Church Mission library. Because of her father's association with religious and social reformers, she also came into contact with prominent names like Vishnu Shastri Pandit, a strong proponent of women's causes in Western India at the time, along with European men and women, exposing her to liberal reformism. With her mother, she also regularly attended the weekly meetings of the Prarthanä Samäj and Arya Mahilä Samäj.

=== "Restitution of conjugal rights" case by Bhikaji ===
In March 1884, Bhikaji sent a legal notice to Sakharam Arjun via his lawyers Chalk and Walker, asking him to desist from preventing Rukhmabai from joining him. Eventually Sakharam Arjun sought legal help and via lawyers Payne-Gilbert, and Sayani provided grounds for Rukhmabai's refusal to join Bhikaji.

In 1885, the case of Bhikaji seeking "restitution of conjugal rights" titled "Bhikaji vs. Rukhmabai, 1885" came up for hearing and the judgement was passed by Justice Robert Hill Pinhey. Pinhey stated that English precedents on restitution did not apply to the case as the English law applied to consenting adults. He also found fault with the English law cases and found no precedent in Hindu law. He declared that Rukhmabai had been wed in her "helpless infancy" and that he could not compel a young lady. Justice Pinhey retired soon after. In 1886, the case was brought up for retrial. Rukhmabai's counsels included J.D. Inverarity Jr. and Kashinath Trimbak Telang. The case drew criticisms from various sections of the society, in some cases claims that the law did not respect the sanctity of Hindu customs. Specifically, criticism of Justice Pinhey's decision came from the Native Opinion, an Anglo-Marathi weekly run by Vishwanath Narayan Mandlik (1833–89) who supported Bhikaji. A Pune weekly run by Balgangadhar Tilak, the Mahratta, wrote that Justice Pinhey did not understand the spirit of Hindu laws and that he sought reforms by "violent means". In the meantime, a series of articles appearing before and during the trial, in the Times of India penned under the pseudonym a Hindu Lady also caused public reactions. Later on it was revealed that the author was none other than Rukhmabai. The public debate revolved around multiple points of contention - Hindu versus English Law, reform from the inside versus outside and whether ancient customs deserved respect or not. The first appeal against the case was made on 18 March 1886 and was upheld by Chief Justice Sir Charles Sargent and Justice L.H. Bayley. On 4 March 1887, Justice Farran, using interpretations of Hindu laws, ordered Rukhmabai to "go live with her husband or face six months of imprisonment". Rukhmabai responded that she would rather face imprisonment than obey the verdict. This resulted in further upheaval and social debate. Balgangadhar Tilak wrote in the Kesari that Rukhmabai's defiance was the result of an English education and declared that Hinduism was in danger. On the other hand, Max Müller responded writing that the legal route was not the solution to the problem of Rukhmabai's case and that it was Rukhmabai's education that had made her the best judge of her own choices.

=== Dissolution of Marriage ===
After the series of court cases which resulted in the affirmation of the marriage, she appealed to Queen Victoria.

Everywhere it is considered one of the greatest blessings of God that we are under the protection of our beloved Queen Victoria's Government, which has its world wide fame for best administration. If such a Government cannot help unyoke us Hindu woman, what Government on earth has the power to relieve the daughters of Ind from their present miseries? This 50th year of our Queen's accession to the most renowned throne is the jubilee year in which every town and every village in her dominions is to show their loyalty in the best way it can, and wish the mother Queen a long happy life, to rule over us for many years with peace and prosperity. At such an unusual occasion will the mother listen to an earnest appeal from her millions of Indian daughters and grant them a few simple words of change into the book on Hindu law- that 'marriages performed before the respective ages of 20 in boys and 15 in girls shall not be considered legal in the eyes of the law if brought before the Court.' This mere sentence will be sufficient for the present to have enough check on child marriages, without creating a great vexation among the ignorant masses. This jubilee year must leave some expression on us Hindu women, and nothing will be more gratefully received than the introduction of this mere sentence into our law books. It is the work of a day if God wished it, but without His aid every effort seems to be in vain. So far, dear lady, I have dwelt on your patience, for which an apology is necessary. With best compliments -I remain yours very sincerely, Rukhmabai.

— Rukhmabai's Testimony to the Government of India. Daily Telegraph, 15 July 1887. page 2.

It has been claimed that Queen Victoria overruled the court and dissolved the marriage. However no primary documentary evidence has been provided to support Queen Victoria's direct intervention in the case.

In July 1888, a settlement was reached with Bhikaji and he relinquished his claim on Rukhmabai for a payment of two thousand rupees. Bhikaji remarried in 1889 and Rukhmabai went on to become a widely revered feminist and medical practitioner.

=== Influence on Age of Consent Act, 1891 ===
The case generated a great deal of debate both within India and England. It drew written commentaries from reformers like Behramji Malabar and Balgangadhar Tilak, journalistic opinion pieces from prominent names like Rudyard Kipling, and broader feminist discussions in British women's magazines.

Ultimately, the publicity and debate generated by this case helped influence the enactment of the "Age of Consent Act" in 1891, which changed the age of consent from 10 to 12 years across British India.

== Career ==
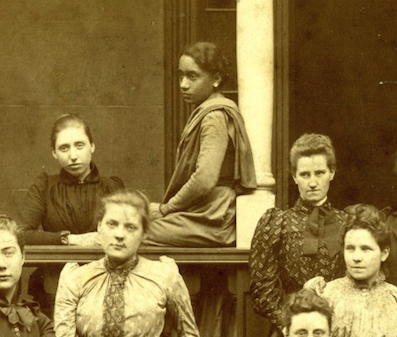
Rukhmabai and others c 1892, LSMW

Rukhmabai received support from the likes of Edith Pechey (then working at the Cama Hospital) who not only encouraged her but helped raise funds for her further education. Other supporters included Shivajirao Holkar who donated 500 Rupees for "demonstrating courage to intervene against traditions", suffrage activists like Eva McLaren and Walter McLaren, the Countess of Dufferin's Fund for Supplying Medical Aid to the Women of India, Adelaide Manning and others who helped establish "The Rukhmabai Defence Committee" to help gather fund towards supporting her cause of continuing education.

In 1889, Rukhmabai travelled to England to study medicine. She studied at the London School of Medicine for Women (LSMW) the Royal Free Hospital, London. During her studies she also trained at the Rotunda Hospital, Dublin and the Royal Sussex County Hospital, Brighton. As women were not yet eligible for the qualifying examinations of the London medical colleges, she travelled to Edinburgh where she obtained the Scottish Triple Qualification in 1894. The qualification enabled her to practise medicine Britian. Rukhmabai subsequently became the second Indian woman, after Kadambini Ganguly, to qualify and practice as a physician.

In 1895, she returned to India and worked as the Chief Medical Officer at the Women's Hospital in Surat. In 1918, she turned down the offer of a role in the Woman's Medical Service, opting instead to work at the Zenana (Woman's) State Hospital in Rajkot until her retirement in 1929. She established the Red Cross Society at Rajkot. Rukhmabai chose to settle in Bombay after her retirement.

== Later life ==
In 1929 after her retirement, she published a pamphlet titled "Purdah - the need for its abolition" arguing that young widows were being denied the chance to actively contribute to Indian society.

== Death ==
Rukhmabai died, aged 90, from lung cancer on 25 September 1955.

== In popular culture ==
- In 2008, the specifics of the legal case between Rukhmabai and her husband were published as a book titled Enslaved Daughters: Colonialism, Law and Women's Rights (ISBN 9780195695731) by author Sudhir Chandra.
- In 2016, the story of Rukhmabai was adapted into a Marathi film titled Doctor Rakhmabai starring Tannishtha Chatterjee directed by Anant Mahadevan and produced by Dr Swapna Patker.
- Rukhmabai by Sudhir Chandra explores the life and times of a child bride turned rebel-doctor. Published by Pan Macmillan India in 2024, the book is a biography based on decades of research.

== Recognition ==
- 19?? - A hospital in Surat was named after her
- On 22 November 2017, Google commemorated Rukhmabai's 153rd Birthday with a Google Doodle on their Indian front page. Although this gave her name as "Rukhmabai Raut" there is no evidence that she ever used the surname of her father, step-father or of Dadaji. She signed herself as "Rukhmabai" in her medical writings and her registration with the Registrar of the General Medical Council also only uses "Rukhmabai".

== See also ==
- Feminism in India
- Anandi Gopal Joshi
