= Doctor Rakhmabai (film) =

Marathi-language biographical drama

- Directed by: Anant Mahadevan
- Written by: Bikas Mishra
- Screenplay by: Bikas Mishra
- Story by: Mohini Varde
- Produced by: Swapna Patker
- Starring: Tannishtha Chatterjee
- Cinematography: Alphonse Roy
- Edited by: Anant Mahadevan
- Music by: Rohan-Rohan
- Release date: 23 September 2016
- Running time: 124 minutes
- Country: India
- Language: Marathi
- Box office: ₹3.5 crore

Doctor Rakhmabai is a 2016 Indian Marathi-language biographical drama film, produced by Swapna Patker and directed by Anant Mahadevan. It stars Tannishtha Chatterjee as Dr. Rakhmabai and the music was composed by Rohan-Rohan. The film follows the real life story of Rukhmabai and how she won one of India's first divorce cases and then travelled to the United Kingdom to get her medical degree to become one of India's first female practicing doctor.

== Cast ==
- Tannishtha Chatterjee as Dr. Rakhmabai
- Prasad Oak as Dr. Sarkharam Arjun
- Kavita Lad as Jayantibai
- Santosh Juvekar as Dadaji
- Alexx O'Nell as Dr. David
- Bharat Dabholkar as Grandfather
- Sharad Ponkshe as Narayan Dharmaji
- Elena Kasnatcheewa as Dr. Edith
- Bhaktimahednra Pawar as Rakhmabai 11 years old
- Kristen Peterson as Rakhmabais Lawyer
- Aditi Sarangdhar as Vidya Oza

== Film Festivals ==
2017 IndoGerman Filmweek (DCSAFF)
2017 Dallas Fort/Worth South Asian Film Festival (DFWSAFF)
2017 Marathi International Film Festival (MIFF)
2017 Jagran Film Festival (JFF)
2017 Indian Film Festival of Melbourne (IFFM)
2018 Lonavala International Film Festival India (LIFFI)

== Awards and nominations ==
Year	Award	Category	Recipient(s) and nominee(s)	Result	Ref.
2017	Maharashtra State Film Awards	Best Sound		Won	
2017	Maharashtra State Film Awards	Best Costume Design		Won	
2017	Maharashtra State Film Awards	Best Art Direction		Won	
2017	Maharashtra State Film Awards	Best Sound Design		Won	
2017	Maharashtra State Film Awards	Best Picture	Swapna Patker	Nominated	
2017	Maharashtra State Film Awards	Best Director	Anant Mahadevan	Nominated	
2017	Maharashtra State Film Awards	Best Actress	Tannishtha Chatterjee	Nominated	
2017	Maharashtra State Film Awards	Best Supporting Actor	Santosh Juvekar	Nominated	
2017	DC South Asian Arts Film Festival (DCSAFF)	Audience Poll - Best Feature Film	Swapna Patker	Won	
2017	17th New York Indian Film Festival	Best Actress	Tannishtha Chatterjee	Nominated	
2017	Pune International Film Festival	Best Actress	Tannishtha Chatterjee	Won	
2018	4th Rajasthan International Film Festival (RIFF)	Best Regional Film	Swapna Patker	Won	
2018	4th Rajasthan International Film Festival (RIFF)	Best Regional Director	Anant Mahadevan	Won	
2018	4th Rajasthan International Film Festival (RIFF)	Best Actress	Tannishtha Chatterjee	Won	
