= Roam Rome Mein =

2019 Indian psychodrama film

- First look poster
- Directed by: Tannishtha Chatterjee
- Written by: Tannishtha Chatterjee
- Produced by: Eros International; Pankaj Razdan
- Starring: Nawazuddin Siddiqui; Tannishtha Chatterjee; Vineet Kumar; Urbano Barberini; Pamela Villoresi
- Cinematography: Sunita Radia
- Edited by: Protim Khaound; Archit Rastogi
- Music by: Alokananda Dasgupta
- Production companies: Eros International; Rising Star Entertainment
- Release date: October 2019 (Busan)
- Country: India
- Languages: English; Hindi; Italian

Roam Rome Mein is a 2019 Indian psychological drama film directed by Tannishtha Chatterjee and produced by Pankaj Razdan under the Eros International and Rising Star Entertainment banners. It features Nawazuddin Siddiqui, Tannishtha Chatterjee, Valentina Corti, and Francesco Apolloni in lead roles. It also includes a supporting cast of Vineet Kumar, Andrea Scarduzio, Ciera Foster, and Priyansh Jora.

The film premiered on 5 October at 24th Busan International Film Festival held from 3 to 12 October 2019. It was showcased in "A Window on Asian Cinema". This film marks directorial debut of actress Tannishtha Chatterjee. The film is in English, Hindi and Italian.

The film was selected as the Closing Night Film at the 2025 National Indian Film Festival of Australia (NIFFA).

== Synopsis ==
The film revolves around Reena (Tannishtha Chatterjee), who goes to Rome, Italy to find her freedom from strict patriarchal father, and Raj (Nawazuddin Siddiqui), her brother, and his journey of awakening as he goes to find her, and along the way he learns things about Reena's life as well as his own.

== Cast ==
- Nawazuddin Siddiqui as Raj
- Tannishtha Chatterjee as Reena
- Valentina Corti
- Isha Talwar
- Francesco Apollini
- Urbano Barberini
- Pamela Villoresi
- Vineet Kumar
- Andrea Scarduzio
- Ciera Foster
- Priyansh Jora
- Giada Benedetti
- Tanuka Laghate
- Arshia Verma as young Reena

== Release ==
The film had its World premiere at Busan International Film Festival held from 3 to 12 October 2019. It had its European premiere at International Rome Film Festival and Indian premiere at Mumbai Film Festival MAMI.

== Awards ==
Tannishtha Chatterjee won the Asia Star award presented by Marie Claire at the Busan International Film Festival 2019.

The film won best film in Berlin at the IndoGermanFilmWeek 2020

== Reviews ==
Paroleacolori.com called the directors work of great artistic, sociological, cultural value and of notable emotional impact. Vittorio de Argo reviewed it at Rome film festival said Roam Rome Mein captivated the audience and impressed even your old and cynical sent. An ambitious, particular, lively film full of twists and stylistically innovative and bold choices. Cinecircoloromano.it called the film Unique and original. Cinematographe.it called it a cinematic jewel which treats the role of women in society as a subject with originality as never before. The Hollywood Reporter has reviewed it as a crowd pleasing fantasy with a feminist punch which found strong audience support in initial outings at the Busan, Mumbai and Rome film festivals.
