= Meena (film) =

2014 documentary film about sex trafficking in India

- Film poster
- Directed by: Lucy Liu; Colin K. Gray; Megan Raney
- Written by: Colin K. Gray; Megan Raney
- Produced by: Mikaela Beardsley; Kevin Chinoy; Kerry Girvin; Jamie Gordon
- Starring: Tannishtha Chatterjee; Himani Shivpuri; Vikas Shrivastav
- Cinematography: Hugh Bell
- Edited by: Tony Hale; Becky Hutner
- Music by: Jay Lifton
- Distributed by: Guggenheim Girvin Pictures; GRAiNEY Pictures
- Release date: June 26, 2014 (United States)
- Running time: 20 minutes and 14 seconds
- Country: United States
- Language: Hindi

Meena is a drama film about sex trafficking in India that premiered on June 26, 2014, in New York City. This film marks the directorial debut of Lucy Liu, Colin K. Gray, and Megan Raney.

== Premise ==
The film is based on the true story Meena Khatun, a girl from India, who was forced into sex slavery since age 11. In the film, the character is titled Meena Hasina and is shown to be aged 8 instead of the original 11.

== Cast ==
- Tannishtha Chatterjee as Meena Hasina
  - Sparsh Khanchandani as young Meena Hasina
- Himani Shivpuri as Ainul Bibi
- Vikas Shrivastav as Manooj
- Prerna Punjabi as Naina
- Almaas as Kamala

== Production ==
Filming began in Mumbai, India in 2010 and is based on the first chapter of Half the Sky by Nicholas Kristof and Sheryl WuDunn.
