= Balkadu =

- Directed by: Atul Kale
- Written by: Ambar Hadap; Ganesh Pandit
- Produced by: Swapna Patker
- Starring: Umesh Kamat; Neha Pendse; Prasad Oak
- Cinematography: Ajit Reddy
- Edited by: Apurva Motiwale
- Music by: Ajit-Sameer
- Distributed by: The Royal Maratha Entertainment
- Release date: 23 January 2015
- Running time: 150 minutes
- Country: India
- Language: Marathi

Balkadu is a 2015 Indian Marathi language political action film. The film stars Umesh Kamat, Neha Pendse and Prasad Oak in lead roles and stars Supriya Pathare, Tiku Talsania, Pushkar Shrotri, Anand Ingale in supporting roles. Balkadu was directed by Atul Kale and produced by Swapna Patker. Balkadu is loosely expected to be based on the ideologies of Indian politician Bal Thackeray, the film contains voice clippings of Thackeray's political career.

== Cast ==
- Umesh Kamat as Balkrishna Patil
- Neha Pendse as Sai
- Prasad Oak
- Supriya Pathare as Balkrishna's mother
- Pushkar Shrotri as Nandu Patil, Balkrishna's father (Special appearance)
- Mahesh Shetty as Jehangir Singh
- Anand Ingale
- Tiku Talsania as Principal
- Bhalchandra Kadam as Peon
- Atul Kale as Local Political Leader who is slapped by Nandu Patil (Guest role)

== Production ==
=== Casting ===
Tiku Talsania, who has acted previously in Bollywood movies like Andaz Apna Apna and Ishq was signed on for the film as his debut in the Marathi cinema. Tiku portrays the role of a school principal in the film.

== Music ==
Soundtrack for Balkadu was composed by the duo Ajit-Samir who have worked on Kaksparsh previously and have contributed to movies like Me Shivajiraje Bhosale Boltoy as the trio Ajit-Atul-Sameer.

No.	Title	Artist(s)	Length
1.	"Powada"	Dev Sen
2.	"Hindu Hriday"	Ajit Parab

== Release ==
Balkadu released on the birth anniversary of late Balasaheb Thackeray on 23 January 2015.

=== Critical reception ===
Upon release, Balkadu opened to negative reviews from critics. Pune Mirror gave the film 2 stars out of five, stating "I am sure his [Balasaheb's] life and ideology can be well expressed in a film. Sadly, Balkadu is not that film. At best, Balkadu is a case of wishful thinking. At worst, it's a propaganda the Sena does not need at the moment."
