= The Colour of Darkness =

- Directed by: Girish Makwana
- Written by: Girish Makwana
- Produced by: Lorraine Grigg
- Starring: Vidya Makan, Sahil Saluja
- Cinematography: Randev Bhaduri, Alex Power, Fabio Capodivento
- Edited by: Ken Khan
- Music by: Girish Makwana
- Release dates: 21 August 2016 (IFFM); 19 May 2017 (Australia); 13 October 2017 (India)
- Language: English

The Colour of Darkness is a 2016 film written and directed by Girish Makwana, focusing on the 2009 attacks on Indian students in Melbourne and the caste system in India.

The film premiered at the Indian Film Festival of Melbourne (IFFM) on 21 August 2016.

== Plot ==
An Australian-Indian journalist, Maria (Vidya Makan), is investigating an attack on an Indian student in Melbourne, and subsequently meets Giriraj (Sahil Saluja) and embarks on a journey through the social history of Indian and modern Australian society.

== Cast ==
- Vidya Makan as Maria
- Sahil Saluja as Giriraj
- Sanjeet Pahil as Jaydeep
- Derryn Hinch as Petre McCallum
- Michelle Celebicanin as Sherley O'Neill
- Ashrut Khatter as Srinivas
- Meeraj Shah as Nikunj Verma
- Davini Malcolm as Margaret
- Russell Williamson as Steve
- Mukesh Meckwan as Kanti

== Production ==
According to Makwana, he got the initial idea of the story during a phone conversation with his father around the time of 2009 attacks on Indian students in Melbourne. His father's experiences of discrimination in India gave Makwana an idea to connect two tales and two countries.

The film was shot in Melbourne and Gujarat.

The film was inspired by Makwana's family's experience with the caste system of India, with his family being untouchables in Gujarat.

=== Casting ===
Makwana auditioned almost three hundred actresses before casting Vidya Makan as Maria. The process took about two and half years.

In Indian cast, Makwana used local people as well theatre artists from India for authenticity.

Makwana recruited Pragyan Patra to sing for the film after seeing her sing on the reality show "Voice of India." According to Patra, she initially auditioned for Makwana via a WhatsApp recording.

Then-Australian senator Derryn Hinch was recruited to play a politician in the film.

=== Development ===
To find a location which gave the feel of real Indian village during the 1960s, producers Lorraine and Girish scouted locations for six months before settling down to shoot in the inner rural area of Kheda for purposes of authenticity.

The film was edited at Media Network Corporation Film Studios in New Zealand by Ken Khan and Post Produced by Prashanth Gunasekaran.

== Release ==
The film premiered on 21 August 2016 at the Indian Film Festival in Melbourne, Australia. It was later screened at the 15th Dhaka International Film Festival in January 2017.

It was accepted for competition in the 2017 AACTA film awards.

=== Censorship in India ===
Initially, to be released in India in May 2017, the film's Indian release had to be delayed several months due to disagreements with the Central Board of Film Certification in India. The Board insisted on several changes such as removing the word achhoot (untouchable), and cutting a dialogue which described India as the "most racist country in the world."

About the censorship, Makwana commented "The fact is that untouchability (achhoot) is a part of our history and is still prevalent and it seems strange that a movie which explores caste discrimination has been asked to beep the word. I am only showing what exists.

The film was released in India on 13 October 2017.

== Music ==
The film's director and writer, Girish Makwana, composed all the film's music, utilising a real string orchestra to record the music. The film's official sound track contains six tracks.

All tracks are written by Girish Makwana.

The Colour of Darkness
No.	Title	Artist	Length
1.	"Naina(Duet)"	Madhu Madhabi Roy & Pratik Gawshinde	6:36
2.	"O Piya"	Pragya Patra	4:11
3.	"Ab Pal Beete Na"	Madhu Madhabi Roy	3:49
4.	"Naina(Female)"	Madhu Madhabi Roy	6:36
5.	"Jara Thumka"	Kanchan Kiran Mishra	5:12
6.	"Naina(Male)"	Pratik Gawshinde	6:36
