= Vikas Shrivastav =

Indian actor

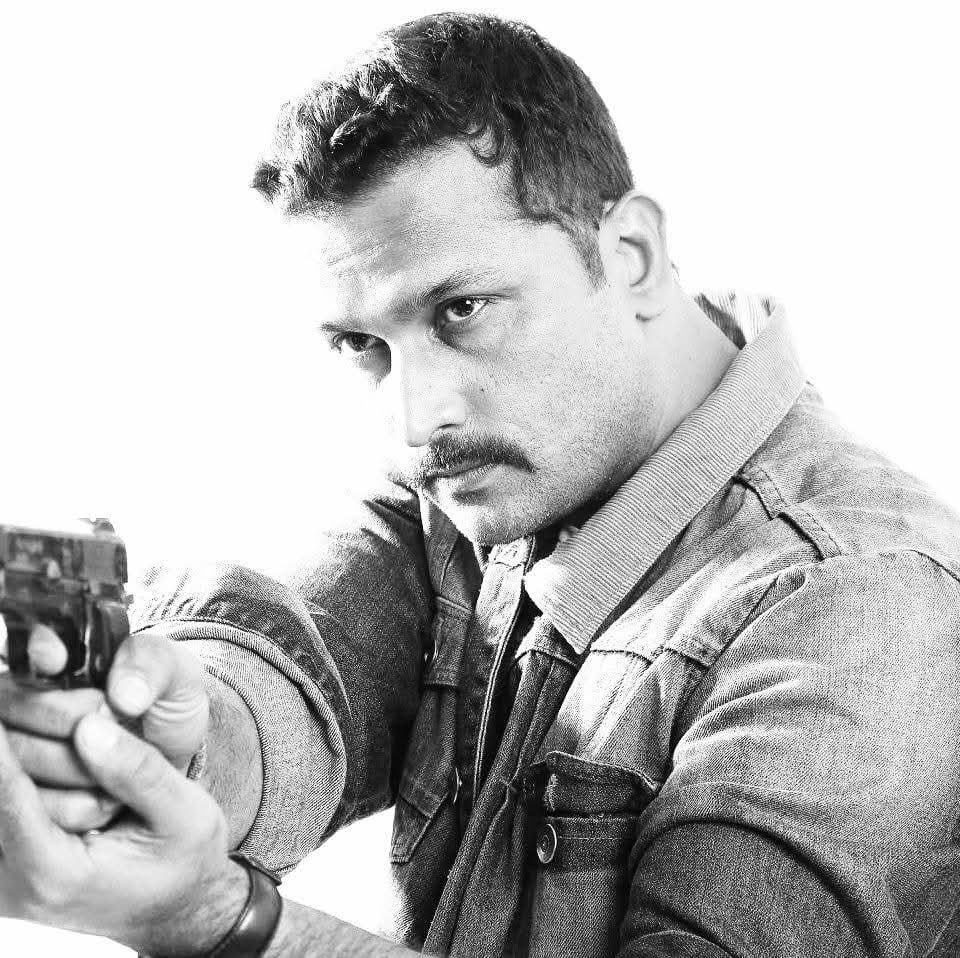
- A photo taken during the shooting of Dangerous Ishhq
- Born: Patna, Bihar
- Other names: Vikas Shrivastava, Vikas Srivastav, Vikas Srivastava
- Occupation: Actor
- Years active: 2003–present

Vikas Shrivastav is an Indian actor who has appeared primarily in Hindi films.

== Career ==
Vikas Shrivasatav was born in Bihar and grew up in Uttar Pradesh. He worked in the theatre since he was young. He started his career as an actor with Gangaajal. Vikas got his breakthrough as an actor in several successful films, including The Dirty Picture (2011), Talaash: The Answer Lies Within (2012), Dhoom 3 (2013), Special 26 (2013), and Gabbar Is Back (2015). He has worked on two short films: the Scottish-Indian co-production Hanki Panki (2013) and the Hollywood production Meena (2014). He played the lead role as Nirbhay Gujjar in Beehad - The Ravine (2013). In 2019, he became a lyricist for The Gandhi Murder and acted in the Tamil film Kadaram Kondan. In 2020, he was cast in the Savdhan India FIR Series as an honest police officer.

== Incident ==
In 2016, an incident occurred after Shrivastav returned from Dehradun to Versova, where several lakhs of valuables were stolen. The suspect was later revealed to be Narendra Tak, an actor, who stayed with Shrivastav.

== Filmography ==
- All works are in Hindi, unless otherwise noted.

=== Films ===
Year	Film	Role	Notes
2003	Gangaajal		Hindi film debut; credited as Vikas Srivastav
2008	Contract	RAW Lalji	
2009	Billu	Daamchand's goon #2	
2009	Barah Aana	Gang member with stick	
2009	Wanted		
2010	Phoonk 2	Balu	
2010	Raavanan	Veera's aide	Tamil film debut
2010	Raavan	Beera's aide	
2010	Red Alert: The War Within	Naxalite	
2010	Once Upon a Time in Mumbai	Verghese	
2010	Gangor	Daroga	Bengali film debut
2010	Action Replayy	Raman Raghav	
2011	Shaitan	Cop 1	
2011	Hum Tum Shabana	Don 1	
2011	The Dirty Picture	Sudhir	
2012	Dangerous Ishhq	Inspector Arbaaz Sheikh	
2012	Mere Dost Picture Abhi Baki Hai		
2012	Ajab Gazabb Love	Mhatre	
2012	Talaash: The Answer Lies Within	Babu Tipnis	
2013	Special 26	Rajiv Gupte	
2013	Jayantabhai Ki Luv Story	Inspector Parab	
2013	Beehad - The Ravine	Nirbhay Gujjar	Lead role
2013	Ek Thi Daayan	Police Inspector	
2013	Dhoom 3	Tamil Don	
2014	Ek Villain	Wagle	
2014	Sonali Cable	Inspector Gawde	credited as Vikas Shrivas
2014	Ungli	Inspector Bhende	
2015	Gabbar is Back	Inspector Vikas	
2016	Anna		
2018	Thugs of Hindostan	Daroga	
2018	Bhaiaji Superhit		
2019	Battalion 609	Al-Nazar	
2019	The Gandhi Murder	Nathuram Godse	English film debut; also lyricist
2019	Kissebaaz	Inspector Rajender Jha	
2019	Kadaram Kondan	Vincent Rajadurai	Tamil film
2022	Samrat Prithviraj	Jayachandra's guard	
2024	Zehan		
2025	HIT: The Third Case		Telugu film

=== Short films ===
Year	Film	Role	Notes
2013	Hanki Panki	Maharaja of Have to Pushcar	English film
2014	Meena	Manooj	

=== Television ===
Year	Program	Role	Notes
2009	Na Aana Is Des Laado	Shera	Replaced by Bhavin Wadia
2012	Ramayan	Nishadraj	
2016	24	Shinde	4 episodes
2018	Chandrashekhar	Sachindranath Bakshi	
2020	Savdhan India FIR Series	Avinash Raj Singh	
2023–2024	Kaisa Hai Yeh Ristha Anjana	—N/a	As director
2025	Dabba Cartel		1 episode
