= Sakharam Arjun =

Indian physician and social reformer

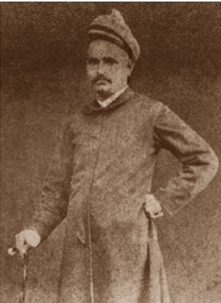
Portrait from the archives of the Acworth Leprosy Hospital

Sakharam Arjun (sometimes Sakharam Arjun Ravut in official documents but he did not use the caste-linked surname in publications) (1839-16 April 1885) was a medical doctor and social activist in Bombay. An expert on Indian medicinal plants, he was one of the two Indian founding members of the Bombay Natural History Society. He became the step-father of the pioneering woman physician Rukhmabai (1864–1955) after he married her widowed mother Jayantibai. He also wrote books in Marathi.

== Biography ==
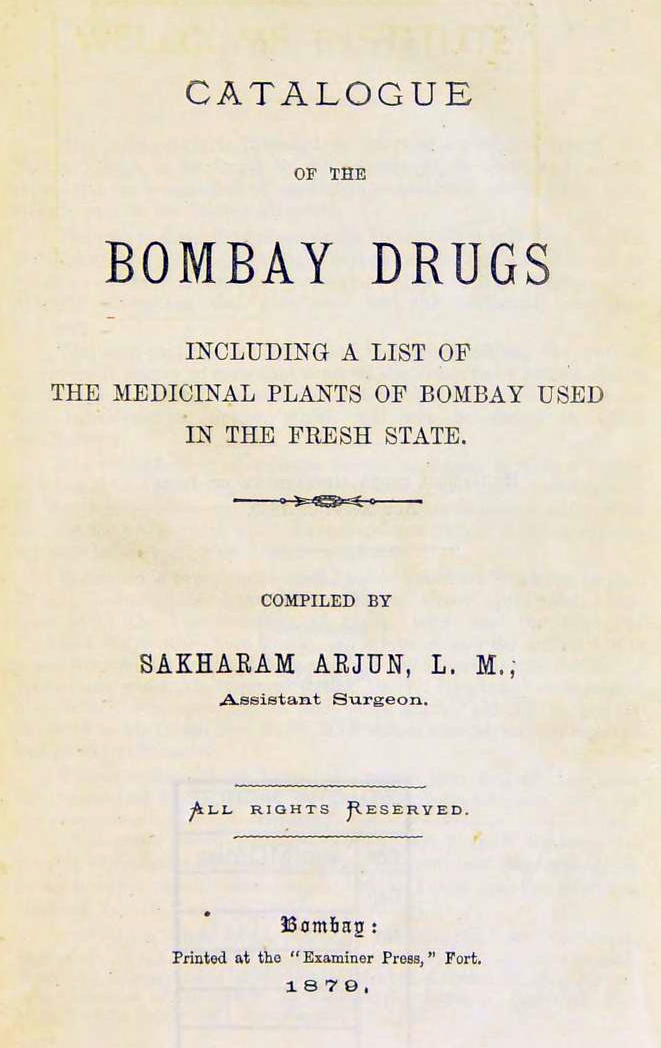
Cover of the 1879 Catalogue of the Bombay Drugs

Arjun was born in Mumbai and lost both his parents by 1850. Arjun studied at Elphinstone Institution and joined Grant Medical College as a Stipendiary Student in 1858. His tutor was Narayan Daji, brother of Bhau Daji. Arjun received a Licentiate of Medicine from the Bombay University in 1863. He joined to teach medical botany and was made an assistant, the first Indian in the position, to William Guyer Hunter. He worked at the Jamsetjee Jeejeebhoy Hospital and was for sometime in charge of the ward for incurables. He conducted experiments on the therapeutic value of oils like chaulmoogra and cashew nut in the treatment of leprosy. He was later appointed Assistant Surgeon. Sakharam was interested in public education on health and published Vaidyatatva (1869), Garbhavidya va Prasutikaran (1873), Vivahavidnyan (1877) among others. He also subscribed to The Theosophist writing a note on Physiology of Marriage in 1880. Sakharam Arjun married Jayantibai, the widow of Janardhan Pandurang, and supported his step-daughter Rukhmabai who was married as a child and refused to go to live with her husband. This led to a landmark court case and Rukhmabai later went to study medicine in London (with the assistance of others like Edith Pechey Phipson) to become one of the first Indian women doctors. In 1883, Sakharam Arjun was one of two Indian founding members (the other being Atmaram Pandurang) of the Bombay Natural History Society. Arjun had been one of the presidents of the Bombay Medical Union. Sakharam Arjun died before the Rakhmabai case came to an end. He died on 16 April 1885 leaving Jayantibai (died 10 January 1904) and three sons from his first marriage, Vasantrao, Yeshwantrao and Raghunathrao.
