= Sadhu Hiranand =

Sindhi language writer

Hiranand Shaukiram Advani (23 March 1863- 14 July 1893), known as Sadhu Hiranand was a Sindhi language prose writer, journalist, educationist social reformer and advocate for women's education.

Advani founded Union Academy, a coed school in Hyderabad, Sindh, British India (now Pakistan). He served as editor of monthly literary magazine Sarsoti and two daily newspapers, Sindh Sudhar (Sindhi) and Sindh Times (English).

Rishi Dayaram Gidumal called Advani" Sindh Ji Aatma" or "Soul of Sindh".

== Biography ==
Advani was born in Hyderabad on 23 March 1863. He was third son of Deewan Shaukiram Advani and the younger brother of Navalrai Advani. He received his early education in Hyderabad but went for higher education to (Calcutta) now Kolkata, India. In Kolkata, Advani met Shri Keshab Chandra Sen and Sri Ramakrishna Paramahamsa, who inspired him to become an educator.

Returning to Hyderabad, Advani and his brother Sadhu Navalrai established Union Academy, a school for boys and girls in Hyderabad. The brothers launched awareness campaigns throughout Hyderabad to promote education. Advani had to convince parents to send their daughters to his school as education of girls was not widely accepted in that era.

In 1886, Advani started a newspaper Sind Sudhar, where he remained as the chief editor for three years. In 1890, He started a Sindhi language literary magazine "Sarsoti". This was the first magazine in Sindh that was popular among both Hindus and Muslims . Advani served as editor and regularly contributed essays, stories and literary articles.

Advani died in 1893 at age 30.

In 1926, Bherumal Meharchand Advani compiled the book Hire Joon Kahaniyoon, which contains Advani writings from Sarsoti.
