= Behramji Malabari =

Indian poet, publicist, author and social reformer (1853-1912)

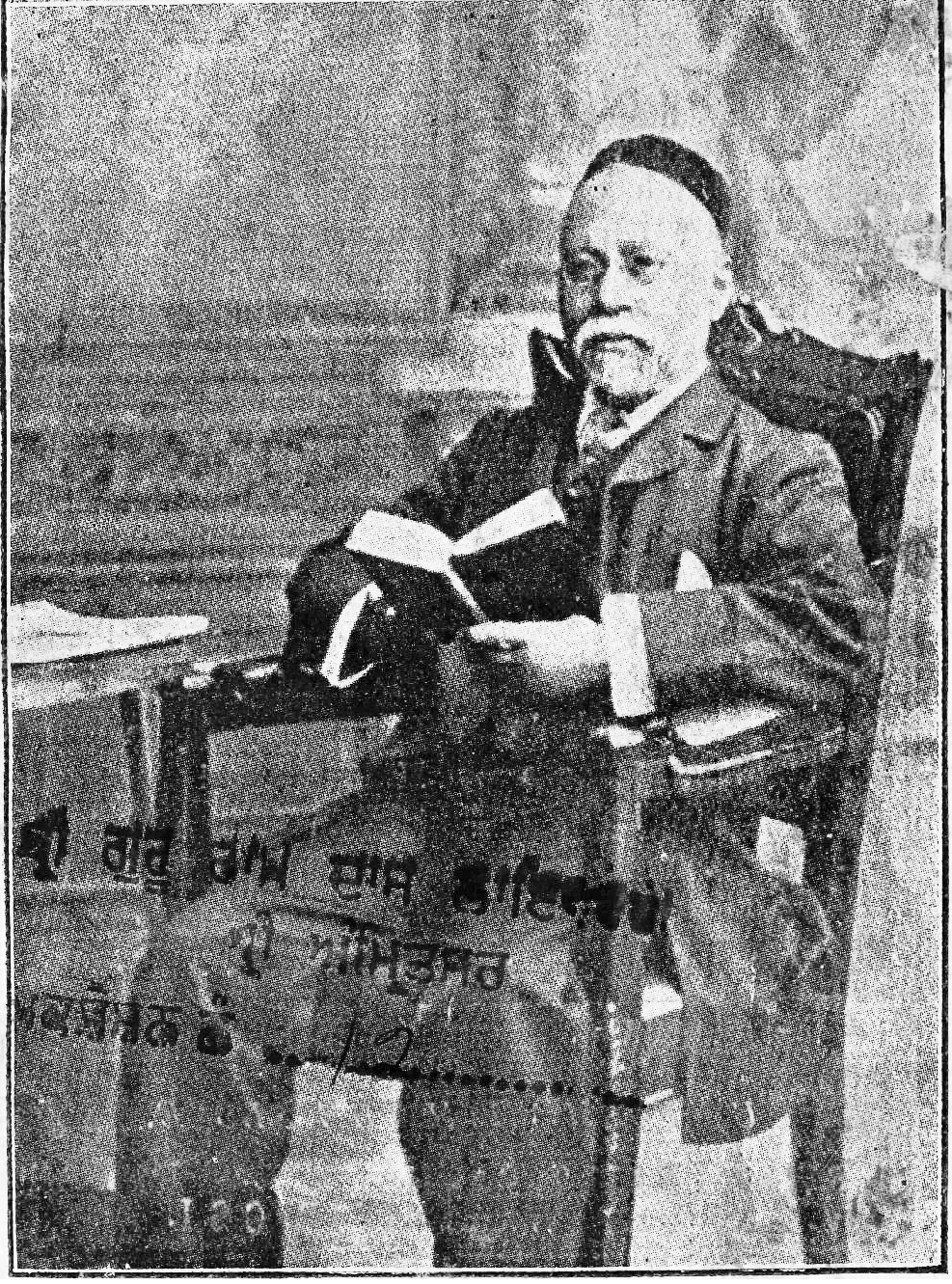
- Born: Behramji Merwanji Malabari; 18 May 1853; Baroda
- Died: 12 July 1912 (aged 59); Simla
- Occupations: poet, publicist, author, and social reformer
- Writing career
- Language: Gujarati, English

Behramji Merwanji Malabari JP (18 May 1853 – 12 July 1912) was an Indian poet, publicist, author, and social reformer best known for his ardent advocacy for the protection of the rights of women and for his activities against child marriage.

== Early life ==
Behramji Merwanji Malabari was born on 18 May 1853 at Baroda (present-day Vadodara, Gujarat). He was a son of Dhanjibhai Mehta, a Parsi clerk employed by the Baroda State, and Bhikhibai (Gaekwar government). His father, about whom nothing more is known "than that he was a mild, peace-loving man, with a somewhat feeble constitution and not overmuch force of character", died when the boy was six or seven. His mother then took him to Surat (on the coast, 140 km from Baroda), where Behramji was then educated at an Irish Presbyterian mission school. He was subsequently adopted by Merwanji Nanabhai Malabari, the childless owner of a drugstore who traded in sandalwood and spices from the Malabar Coast hence the name 'Malabari'. Merwanji had previously lost two wives before he married Behramji's mother.

== Author and editor ==
As early as 1875 Malabari published a volume of poems in Gujarati, followed in 1877 by The Indian Muse in English Garb, which attracted attention in England, notably from Alfred Tennyson, Max Müller, and Florence Nightingale. Müller and Nightingale would also play a role in his campaign for social reform, and the latter would also write the preface to an 1888/1892 biography of Malabari. At some point, Malabari relocated to the city of Bombay (now Mumbai), then the centre of commerce and administration of the British possessions in Western India. In 1882 he published his Gujarat and the Gujaratis: pictures of men and manners taken from life (London: W.H. Allen, 1882, OCLC= 27113274), a book "of a somewhat satirical nature," that went through five editions.

Malabari's life work began in 1880 when he acquired the Indian Spectator, an English-language daily, which he edited for twenty years until it was merged into the Voice of India, which Malabari had already been editing together with Dadabhai Naoroji and William Wedderburn since 1883. In 1901 he became editor of the monthly East and West, a position he would hold until shortly before his death on 12 July 1912 at Simla.

Malabari's account of his three visits to England, entitled The Indian Eye on English, or, Rambles of a Pilgrim Reformer (Westminster: A. Constance, 1893, OCLC 11695251), went through four editions.

== Social reformer ==
"What propelled Malabari to prominence across India and prompted his first visit to Britain in 1890 was what reformers in Victorian England and India called 'the problem of Hindu women,'" that is, his ardent advocacy for social reform with regards to child marriage and the remarriage of widows. In August 1884, Malabari published a set of Notes on Infant Marriage and Enforced Widowhood, that he sent to 4,000 leading Englishmen and Hindus. In it, Malabari deplored the "social evil" of "baby marriage" and demanded legislature to prevent it. Similarly on the issue of remarriage for widows, Malabari criticised the Hindu practice of prohibiting it, and he placed the blame squarely with that religion's "priestly class" and the "social monopolists" for their "vulgar prejudices." Although acknowledging that many educated Hindus deplored the practice, he repeatedly argued that it was due to inaccurate interpretation of scripture by "the greedy priests" and base Hindu "superstition" that caused "a girl after ten [to be treated as] a serpent in the parents' house." His "notes" were the prelude to an emotionally charged discussion that occupied the press for over seven years and made Malabari "one of, if not the most influential" Indian social reformer of his time.

In 1885, a girl named Rukhmabai was ordered by a Judge Pinhey to return to her husband or be jailed. Malabari's editorials of the Rukhmabai case gave the issue a popular focus, and it "was largely by his efforts" and the agitation of William Thomas Stead in the Pall Mall Gazette that brought about the Criminal Law Amendment Act of 1885, and the Age of Consent Act (which regulated the age of consent for females in Britain and India) in 1891. In this, Malabari "was instrumental not just in refining the gendered dimensions of contests for cultural legitimacy and power in the western presidency, but in refiguring such contests for consumption by the British reform public at home as well." His agitation for reform in India "through the agitation of the British public at home was virtually unprecedented."

In his conviction that the Hindu priesthood were misinterpreting the Vedas and Upanishad, Malabari was also instrumental in the translation of Max Müller's Hibbert Lectures into Indian languages. On the insistence of Müller and assisted by one N. M. Mobedjina, Malabari himself undertook the translation into Gujarati. Malabari then attempted to have the lectures translated into other languages (including Marathi, Bengali, Hindi and Tamil), and to do so travelled extensively to find translators and the funding for them.

Although Malabari stayed away from the Indian National Congress as an organisation, Malabari attended the Indian National Congress in Bombay in 1885, and "he was a nationalist" and he had a close relationship with Dadabhai Naoroji," one of the founders and leaders of the Congress. It was however to his advantage not to allow his name to be aligned to any specific political party or movement, as that would have precluded support from British politicians in his campaign for social reform as well as from the Indian princes of Patiala, Gwalior and Bikaner upon whose financial generosity he depended.

He founded Seva Sadan in 1908 along with a friend, Diwan Dayaram Gidumal. Seva Sadan was specialized in taking care of those women who were exploited and then discarded by society. It provided the destitute women with education and medical and welfare services.

== See also ==
- List of Gujarati-language writers

== Bibliography ==
- Burton, Antoinette (1998), At the Heart of the Empire: Indians and the Colonial Encounter in Late-Victorian Britain, Berkeley: University of California Press
- "Malabari, Behramji" . Encyclopædia Britannica. Vol. 17 (11th ed.). 1911.
- Gidumal, Dayaram (1892), The Life and Life-work of Behramji M. Malabari, London: Fisher and Unwin (2nd ed. of Behramji M. Malabari: A Biographical Sketch, 1888).
- Karkaria, Rustomji Pestonji (1896), India, Forty Years of Progress and Reform: Being a Sketch of the Life and Times of Behramji M. Malabari, London: Henry Frowde, hdl:2027/uc1.$b51958
- Kulke, Eckehard (1978), The Parsis in India: A Minority as Agent of Social Change, New Delhi: Bell Books
- Menant, Delphine (1907), "Influence of Max Müller's Hibbert Lectures in India", The American Journal of Theology, 11 (2): 293–307, doi:10.1086/478685.
- Singh, Sardar Jogendra (1914), B. M. Malabari: Rambles with the Pilgrim Reformer, London: Bell and Sons.
