= Age of Consent Act, 1891 =

Legislation enacted in British India

Indian Criminal Law Amendment Act, 1891

Imperial Legislative Council
- Long title: An Act to amend the Indian Penal Code and the Code of Criminal Procedure, 1882.
- Enacted by: Imperial Legislative Council
- Enacted: 19 March 1891
- Repealed: 26 January 1950

Legislative history
- Bill title: Indian Penal Code and Code of Criminal Procedure, 1882 Amendment Bill
- Introduced by: Sir Andrew Scoble
- Introduced: 9 January 1891
- Second reading: March, 1891

Repealed by
- Act 1 of 1938
- Status: Repealed

The Age of Consent Act, 1891 (Act X of 1891) was a statute enacted in British India on 19 March 1891 which raised the age of consent for sexual intercourse for all girls, married or unmarried, from ten to twelve years in all jurisdictions, its violation subject to criminal prosecution as rape. (Note: For text of the Act, see: Cranenburgh, D. E. (1894). Unrepealed Acts of the Governor-General in Council, Volume III, Containing acts from 1883 to 1893. Calcutta: Law Publishing Press. p. 864.) The act was an amendment of the Indian Penal Code and Code of Criminal Procedure, Section 375, 1882, ("Of Rape"), (Note: For the text of the amended section 375, see Agnew, William Fischer (1898). The Indian penal code: and other acts of the Governor-general relating to offences, with notes. Calcutta: Thacker, Spink, Co. p. 212.) and was introduced as a bill on 9 January 1891 by Sir Andrew Scoble in the Legislative Council of the Governor-General of India in Calcutta. It was debated the same day and opposed by council member Sir Romesh Chunder Mitter (from Bengal) on the grounds that it interfered with orthodox Hindu code, but supported by council member Rao Bahadur Krishnaji Lakshman Nulkar (from Bombay) and by the President of the council, the Governor-General and Viceroy Lord Lansdowne. (Note: For the abstract of the debate, see: Imperial Legislative Council, India (1892). Abstract of the proceedings of the Council of the Governor-General of India assembled for the purpose of making laws and regulations. Calcutta: Office of the Supt. of Govt. Print., India. pp. 8–27.)

While an 1887 case in a Bombay high court of a child-bride Rukhmabai renewed discussion of such a law, it was the death of a ten-year-old Bengali girl, Phulmoni Dasi, due to forceful intercourse by her 35-year-old husband in 1889 that drove intervention by the British. The act was passed in 1891. It received support from Indian reformers such as Behramji Malabari and women social organisations. The law was never seriously enforced and it is argued that the real effect of the law was reassertion of Hindu patriarchal control over domestic issues as a nationalistic cause.

In 1884, Rukhmabai, a 20-year-old woman was taken to Bombay high court by her husband Bhikaji after she refused to live with him. Having married him at the age of 11 years, never having consummated the marriage and having lived separately for nearly 8 years she refused to move back with him. She was ordered by the court to live with her husband or face a six month imprisonment. She refused to comply and the rising costs of the trial forced Bhikaji to withdraw the case in July 1888 upon a settlement of 2000 rupees. This trial was one of the precursors for the passage of this legislation.

In 1889, the death of a 10-year-old married Hindu girl, Phulmoni Dasi, after being brutally raped by her 35-year-old husband, Hari Mohan Maitee, served as a catalyst for its legislation. Hari Mohan Maitee was acquitted on charges of rape, but found guilty on causing death inadvertently by a rash and negligent act.

A committee consisting of influential British and Anglo-Indian statesmen established in London had submitted recommendations to the colonial government including the change in age of consent. The law was signed on 19 March 1891 by the government of Lord Lansdowne raising the age of consent for consummation from ten to twelve years.

== Support ==
Behramji Malabari, a Parsi reformer and a journalist from Bombay advocated for this legislation. He published his messages in "Notes on Infant marriage and enforced widowhood" in 1884. Although a Parsi, he claimed to be as critical of Hindu customs and domestic practices as the British.

Though women were not consulted for determining the effect of child-marriage, women in Bombay presidency including Rukhmabai and Pandita Ramabai made a cogent case for the ban on child-marriage in their magazines and social reform organisations. Anandi Gopal Joshi, a Marathi woman who also happened to be the first female medical doctor in India advocated interference of the British Government in child marriage.

== Opposition ==
The Bill was opposed by many orthodox leaders who believed it as an interference in the Hindu religion. Bal Gangadhar Tilak opposed the bill stating:

We would not like that the government should have anything to do with regulating our social customs or ways of living, even supposing that the act of government will be a very beneficial and suitable measure.

The Bill was also opposed by revivalist nationalists who were against any colonial interference.
