= Dayaram Gidumal =

Indian social reformer, judge, poet and scholar

Dayaram Gidumal Shahani (30 June 1857 – 7 December 1927) or Rishi Dayaram, was an Indian social reformer, judge, poet, and scholar. He was known as the godfather of Sindhi Hindus.

== Life ==
Born in Hyderabad, Sindh, Dayaram received his early education in Persian at home from Akhoond Noor Mahammed. He later studied at Elphinstone College in Bombay and joined the Civil Service. He rose to the position of Judicial Commissioner in Sindh but chose not to accept a position as High Court Judge.

He helped establish the D.J. Sindh College in Karachi and supported education for women. He was a scholar of Arabic, Persian, and Sanskrit. He retired in 1911 to Bombay where he lived in a "Blue Bungalow" on the beach. He founded the Seva Sadan along with Behramji Malabari. He published numerous books including Sata saheliyun (Seven girl-friends, 1906) and Chabak mana lai ain rihan (Lashes for the mind, 1923–29). Works in English include The History of a Humble Soul (a biography of Sadhu Hiranand), Something about Sindh (1882) and a biography of Malabari with an introduction by Florence Nightingale. He wrote on religion and spiritualism under the pen-names of Zero, Bijal and Sigma.

== Family ==
Dayaram first married Yashoda. They had two sons and three daughters. His second marriage was at the age of 56 to a young girl Urmila aged 26 at his ashram in 1913. He withdrew himself from society after this: it was apparently to protect the girl who had become pregnant after a relationship with a boy at the ashram.
