= Sparsh Khanchandani =

Indian child actress

- Born: 11 October 2000 (age 25); Ulhasnagar, Maharashtra, India
- Occupations: Child Actress; Philanthropist
- Years active: 2008–present
- Known for: Uttaran
- Parent(s): Purshottam Khanchandani; Sarita Khanchandani

Sparsh Khanchandani is an Indian film and television actress. She debuted with lead character of young Ichcha in successful and long-running show Uttaran for which she received fame and critical acclaim for her performance in the series. She has been cast in a Hollywood short film called Meena, co-directed by actress Lucy Liu. Khanchandani won the Gr8! Young Achievers Award in 2010 presented by Indian Television Academy. She is also a dubbing artist and voiced Princess Sofia in Sofia The First since 2014 in the Hindi language. She has performed in the film Hichki as a student.

== Television ==
| Year | Show | Role | Channel |
|---|---|---|---|
| 2008 | Uttaran | Ichcha | Colors |
| 2009 | Dill Mill Gayye | Sweety | Star One |
| 2010 | Zara Nachke Dikha | Herself | Star Plus |
| 2011 | Gulaal | Talli | Star Plus |
| 2011–2013 | Parvarrish – Kuchh Khattee Kuchh Meethi | Child Rashi Ahuja | Sony Entertainment Television |
| 2009; 2014; 2024–2025 | C.I.D. | Shreya | Sony Entertainment Television |
| 2018 | Vikram Betaal Ki Rahasya Gatha | Pret Pari | &TV |

== Movies ==
| Year | Title | Role | Notes |
|---|---|---|---|
| 2013 | Shivalika | Tia | |
| 2014 | Meena | Young Meena Hasina | Short film |
| | The Princess Tales | | |
| 2018 | Hichki | Oru | |

== Dubbing Assignments ==
| Year | Movie | Role | Notes |
|---|---|---|---|
| 2014–present | Sofia the First | Princess Sofia | Disney Junior |
