= Shivalika =

- Directed by: Biman Sengupta; Bhagabat Kar
- Written by: Biman Sengupta
- Screenplay by: Biman Sengupta
- Story by: Biman Sengupta & Bhagabat Kar
- Produced by: Soumya Ranjan Patnaik
- Starring: Aman Siddiqui; Sparsh Khanchandani; Mukesh Khanna; Smita Jaykar
- Cinematography: Biman Sengupta
- Edited by: Ashok Sharma
- Music by: Vighnanz; Milind Sagar
- Production companies: 3D Wizards Pvt Ltd.; Eastern Media Ltd.
- Release date: 2013
- Running time: 95 minutes
- Country: India
- Language: Hindi

Shivalika is the first 3D animation movie from Odisha, India. Production began in 2010 and completed in January 2013. The film stars young actors Aman Siddiqui (Bhootnath) and Sparsh Khanchandani (Parvarrish).

== Synopsis ==
This story is about a small boy named Nadu (Aman Siddiqui) who lost his parents several years earlier due to an evil spirit. When the same spirit again attacks and kidnapped his grandmother (Smita Jaykar), he sets off into the jungle to find her and along the way encounters a mysterious place called Shivalika. There he meets many magical creatures which change his view point towards wild animals. He also learns that it's our duty to protect wild animals... especially the endangered ones, like tigers. In the process he turns out to be a courageous prodigy, and eventually confronts that evil spirit to save his grandmother's life.

== Production ==
3D Wizards Pvt. Ltd., in Association with Eastern Media

- Crew Members
- Production designer – Nikhil Baran Sengupta.
- Sound Designer – Pradip Routray.
- Editor – Ashok Sharma
- Background Score – Milind Sagar.

== Voice cast ==
- Aman Siddiqui (Bhootnath) as Nadu
- Sparsh Khanchandani as Tia
- Mukesh Khanna as Yaksha
- Smita Jaykar as Bomma

=== Singers ===
- Shahid Mallya – Jay Bolo
- Shaan – Sunlona
- Richa Sharma – Jiban ek
