= Hanki Panki =

English-language short comedy film

- Poster
- Directed by: Nileish Malhotra
- Screenplay by: Nileish Malhotra; Martial Vout; Dr. Suraina Malhotra; Karyn Watt; Karen Havranek
- Dialogues by: Dr. Suraina Malhotra; Karyn Watt
- Story by: Karyn Watt; Karen Havranek
- Produced by: Nileish Malhotra; Karyn Watt; Karen Havranek
- Starring: Nileish Malhotra; Karyn Watt; Karen Havranek; Vikas Shrivastav
- Cinematography: Jaywant Raut; Stuart Greig
- Edited by: Umesh Rane
- Music by: Amar–Amit Desai; Jonny Downie Junior
- Production companies: KaKaNi Ltd; Malhotra Productions
- Release dates: April 2013 (Cannes Film Festival); June 12, 2013 (Scotland); December 14, 2013 (Mumbai)
- Running time: 35 minutes
- Countries: Scotland; India
- Language: English

Hanki Panki is a 2013 English-language short comedy film directed by Nileish Malhotra, who co-produced, co-wrote, and co-starred in the film alongside Karyn Watt and Karen Havranek. Vikas Shrivastav also stars in the film.

== Plot ==
The film follows two Scottish soman as they travel to Indian for a baking competition, but they end up marrying maharajas after meeting them in a nightclub. They are later robbed and how they return to Scotland from India forms the rest of the story.

== Cast ==
- Nileish Malhotra as Maharaja of Goa Gettum
- Karyn Watt as Madhoor
- Karen Havranek as Pretty Awful
- Vikas Shrivastav as Maharaja of Have to Pushcar

Other people that star in the film include: Dr. Suraina Malhotra, Martial Vout, Peter Fouin, Lesley Watt, Ronnie Williams, Jacqui White, Marcus Langley White, Lynne Anderson, Nikki Fouin, Bob Mayer, Raj Mair, Liz Bell, Dave Bell, Jonny Downie Senior, Manish Gray, Abhiyaan Malhotra, Richa, Rena Havranek, Ivan Havranek, George Watt, Marjory Watt, Pierre Fouin, Arun Nemani, Ankush Tiwari and Prasoon Shukla.

== Production ==
=== Development and casting ===
Karyn Watt worked as a solicitor in Edinburgh, Scotland and Karen Havranek is also not an actor. The scale of the film, which was initially made for their friends only, increased to a full fledged project after their friend director Nilesh Malhotra agreed to helm the project. Vikas Shrivastav became a part of the film after being contacted by his uncle, who worked as a Bollywood producer. Malhotra's wife Dr. Suraina Malhotra, worked as a creative director, scriptwriter and actor in the film. Watt's husband, Peter Fouin, and their neighbour, Raj Mair, also star in the film.

=== Filming and post-production ===
The film was shot in an Indian restaurant in Edinburgh and India. The film was made with the intention of raising money towards Lifeline Express and close to £4000 was sent to the organization.

== Soundtrack ==
The film features the song "A Pair Of Raja" composed by the duo Amar–Amit Desai, the latter of which also sung the song with lyrics by Karyn Watt.

== Release and reception ==
The film was screened as part of the Short Film Corner section at the Cannes Film Festival in April 2013 before being screened in Edinburgh. The film was well received in Scotland. In December 2013, Malhotra received the Best Director award at the Mini Box Office Film Festival in Mumbai.

In an interview with The Herald, an anonymous reporter said, "I have never seen anything like it since Braveheart. Another anonymous reporter said, "Can Cannes cope with this cinematic currycane [hurricane]? Don't ask me".
