= Bherumal Meharchand Advani =

Indian Sindhi writer (1875/76–1950)

- Born: 1875 or 1876; Hyderabad, Bombay Presidency, British India (Now Pakistan)
- Died: 7 July 1950 (aged 74-75); Pune, Maharashtra, India
- Education: Union Academy Hyderabad, Sindh.
- Occupations: Scholar, linguist, researcher, historian, poet
- Writing career
- Genres: Prose, poetry

Bherumal Meharchand Advani (1875/76 – 7 July 1950) was a Sindhi poet, prose writer and scholar. Renowned for his multifaceted contributions, he excelled as an educationist, novelist, linguist, and historian. He authored over 40 books.

== Biography ==
He was born in Hyderabad, Sindh, which is now part of Pakistan. The exact date and even the year of his birth remain uncertain. It is believed to be either 1875 or 1876. His father's name was Meharchand Advani. He studied at Mission School and Union Academy Hyderabad. The Union Academy, founded by Sadhu Navalrai and Hiranand Shaukiram on October 28, 1888, aimed to provide religious instruction, promote the study of Sanskrit, and foster the character development of the younger generation. At the Union Academy, he learned the poetry of Shah Abdul Latif Bhitai from renowned scholars Sadhu Hiranand and Tarachand Shaukiram.

He entered into three marriages during his lifetime. From his first wife, he did not have any children. However, from his second marriage, he had one son and one daughter. Additionally, from his third marriage, he had two daughters.

He began his career as a Distillery Inspector in the Salt Department located in Kotri, Sindh. He dedicated 28 years of his life to this department. In 1925, he was appointed as a Sindhi lecturer at D.J. Sindh College in Karachi. Subsequently, he held the position of Chairman of the Sindhi Department at the same college. In 1949, he relocated to India and resided in Pune until his passing on July 7, 1950.

Renowned Indian writer Hiro Thakur has authored a book detailing his life, achievements, and contributions.

== Contributions ==
He has authored more than 40 books. Some of his most popular books are listed below. A complete list can be found elsewhere.

=== Dramas/stories ===
Some of his drama and stories include:

- Ali Baba aeen Chaleeha Chora (Ali Baba and Forty Thieves), drama, 1903
- Anand Sunrika, novel, 1910
- Azadeea ji Kodi, translated novel
- Bazaziun Jo Natak (Drama of cloth venders), drama, 1921
- Bulbul Beemar (Sick Nightingale), drama, 1902
- Golan Ja Goondar, translated novel, 1926
- Gopi Chand, novel
- Hiris Jo Shikar (Greedy), translation of Shakespeare's King John, 1916
- Mohni Bai, novel
- Muris ji Mursi, drama, 1925
- Tilsam, translated novel, 1927
- Varial aeen Naimat (Varial and Naimat), novel, 1910
- Wado Pangati Muqadmu (Great Social Trial), drama 1925

=== History ===
His most popular books on history include:

- Amilan jo Ahwal (A History of the Amils)
- Hindustan Ji Tareekh (A History of India), 1909
- Qadeem Sindh (Ancient Sindh), 1944
- Sindh jay Hinduan ji Tareekh (History of Sindhi Hindus), Part I & II 1946 & 1947
- Sodhan ji Sahibi or Ranan Jo Raj (Rule of Sodhas and Reign of Ranas), 1924

=== Linguistic ===
He was a lover of Sindhi language, grammar and social sciences. He was also well versed in Sanskrit, Arabic and Persian. As a language expert and grammarian, he authored many books including the following:

- Alif Bay Keenan Thahi (How did alphabet come into being), 1925
- Ghareeb-ul-Lughat (Dictionary of Sindhi), 1907
- Gulqand - Part I & II 1940 & 1945
- Pahakan Ji Peerih
- Rītun ain Rasman jo buniyādu (Origin of Rituals and Customs)
- Sindhi Boli (Sindhi Language), 1925
- Sindhi Bolia Ji Tareekh (History of Sindhi Language)
- Wado Sindhi Waya Karan (Advanced Sindhi Grammar), 1925

=== Poetry ===
He adopted the name "Gharib" (Humble) in his poetry. His poetic works can be classified into two categories: those intended for children and those for adults. In 1926, he published a poetry collection titled "Gulzar-e-Nazem" (Garden of Poetry), specifically aimed at children.

=== Latifiyat ===
He was a master of the poetry of Shah Abdul Latif Bhitai, the greatest Sufi poet of Sindh. One of his masterpieces is the book titled "Latifi Sair" (Latif's Travel, 1929), in which he vividly depicted Shah Latif's journey to Hinglaj, Girnar, and Thar. Additionally, he has authored other books on the poetry of Shah Abdul Latif Bhitai, including:

- Bhitai Ghot
- Gurbukshania varo Shah jo Risalo
- Sur Sorath

=== Other books ===
Advani authored and compiled a number of other books which include the following:

- Bahar-e-Naser
- Chund Kalam: Shah, Sami, Sachal, Dilpat, Bedil, Bekus, Ruhal ain Deewan-i Gulaman Cunda
- Dey ain Wath
- Gulzar-e-Naser: Selection from modern prose
- Mahan-jo-Daro, one of the most ancient sites of the East which has aroused world-wide interest
- Sindh ain Sindhi
- Sindh Jo Sailani
