= Heyy Babyy =

2007 Indian film by Sajid Khan

- Theatrical release poster
- Directed by: Sajid Khan
- Written by: Story: Sajid Khan; Dialogues: Milap Zaveri
- Screenplay by: Sajid Khan; Milap Zaveri; Renuka Kunzru
- Produced by: Sajid Nadiadwala
- Starring: Akshay Kumar; Fardeen Khan; Riteish Deshmukh; Vidya Balan; Boman Irani; Juanna Sanghvi
- Narrated by: Akshay Kumar
- Cinematography: Himman Dhamija
- Edited by: Rameshwar S. Bhagat
- Music by: Songs: Shankar-Ehsaan-Loy; Background Score: Salim–Sulaiman
- Production company: Nadiadwala Grandson Entertainment
- Distributed by: Shree Ashtavinayak Cine Vision; Eros International
- Release date: 24 August 2007
- Running time: 144 minutes
- Country: India
- Language: Hindi
- Box office: ₹83 crore

Heyy Babyy is a 2007 Indian Hindi-language comedy film produced by Sajid Nadiadwala and directed by Sajid Khan. It stars Akshay Kumar, Fardeen Khan, Riteish Deshmukh, Vidya Balan, Juanna Sanghvi and Boman Irani.

The core storyline of this film is loosely based on the Malayalam film Thoovalsparsham (1990) which is an adaptation of the American film Three Men and a Baby (1987), in turn based on the French film Three Men and a Cradle.

== Plot ==
Aarush Mehra lives a fairly wealthy lifestyle in Sydney, Australia, with roommates Tanmay Joglekar and Ali Haider. Aarush starts working for a popular dance club, while Tanmay entertains children as Eddy Teddy and Ali takes care of their apartment. He mostly watches cricket on the television and places bets on the matches. All three are womanizers and usually end up sleeping with different women.

One day they find a baby girl outside their door with a note instructing them to take care of her, since one of them is her father. The three men go to all the women they dated and slept with, but none claim the baby as theirs, and they break up with them. The men try to take care of the baby, but she becomes a huge pain and annoys them. So they drop her off at a house near a church and leave her there by herself. Then they all set off for a Christmas party, but they are all thinking of the baby. A big rainstorm occurs, and the baby develops pneumonia after being left in the rain. The three men rush the baby to the hospital, realizing how much they love her, and regret their decisions. She recovers, and the three become changed men. They love her, pamper her, grow an attachment towards her, and even apologize to all the women they used. They named her Angel due to the miracle that she survived.

One morning, a woman named Isha Sahni comes to take Angel back, claiming the baby to be her daughter. The guys are shocked as Aarush tells them about his past life. One year ago, Aarush traveled to Delhi to attend his cousin Arjun's wedding. There, he met Isha, who also resides in Australia. He put up a facade of being a guy with traditional Indian values, won her over, and they spent the night together and had sex. Shortly after, Isha caught him in a compromising situation with Devika Sharma, Isha's friend, so the couple split up. It wasn't Aarush's fault, as Devika forced herself on top of him to have sex. Aarush returned to Sydney and forgot about the incident. Their history together indicates that Aarush is truly Angel's father.

The guys find it very difficult to live without Angel. Aarush ends up challenging Isha to marry someone faithful within seven days who will accept Angel as a daughter. If she's unsuccessful, she will have to give Angel back to him. They sign a contract to finalize the deal. The men worry that they might lose the bet since Isha is beautiful and wealthy. Aarush plans with Tanmay, Ali, and Bharat, who is Isha's father, to keep Angel with him.

His first attempt involves Ali posing as a botany professor named Parimal Tripathi (inspired by Dharmendra's character from Chupke Chupke) who speaks very pure Hindi. Bharat is impressed by Parimal for this, and Angel recognizes him as well. They manage to get through a few days of the week until one day Isha asks him about marriage. After Isha says this, Ali talks to Aarush and Tanmay, who tell him to go to Disneyland, where Ali gets Bharat attacked. He is stopped from further efforts by Tanmay in the 'Eddy Teddy' costume. Bharat decides that Tanmay is the right man for Isha. Tanmay, Aarush, and Ali make plans to stop Isha from marrying someone else and tell the truth to Angel about their plans to convince her mother. As the contract is about to terminate, Isha somehow manages to find out the truth that she has been cheated by her father, Tanmay, Ali, and most of all, Aarush.

Isha goes with Angel on her private jet to go somewhere very far because she has lost the deal. As she is about to leave, she is stopped by some cops because Ali and Tanmay called them. As they are arguing, Aarush turns up showing Isha the contract and tearing it up, indicating that Isha now has every right over Angel. But before the three men leave heartbroken, Aarush says that a child needs a mother the most, but it also needs a father. Just as they are about to leave, Angel says her first word, "Dada," indicating she has developed an attachment to the men as well, but Isha takes her away in the airplane.

The three men are depressed as they assume that they may never see Angel again until they are surprised to see her on their doorstep. Isha finally realises that Angel needs her father too, and the film ends with their marriage taking place and Angel's photoshoot. During the wedding, Bharat's girlfriend crashes the wedding, and Isha thinks that Aarush is married. The three men get confused and don't know who she is, and she questions Bharat about their relationship, and the three men howl together and take a picture with Angel. The film ends.

== Cast ==
- Akshay Kumar as Aarush Mehra
- Fardeen Khan as Ali "Al" Haider/Professor Parimal Tripathi
- Riteish Deshmukh as Eddy Teddy/Tanmay Joglekar
- Vidya Balan as Isha Sahni Mehra
- Juanna Sanghvi as Angel Mehra, Aarush and Isha’s daughter
- Boman Irani as Bharat Sahni
- Kim Sharma as Bharat's girlfriend and to-be wife - Guest Appearance
- Aarti Chabria as Arush’s ex-girlfriend
- Payal Rohatgi as Tanmay's ex-girlfriend
- Hrishitaa Bhatt as Ali's ex-girlfriend
- Sindhura Gadde as Devika Sharma
- Chirag Vohra as Arjun
- Muskaan Mihani as Arjun's bride
- Anupam Sharma as the doctor
- Jennifer Mayani the supermarket girl
- Vrajesh Hirjee as Ajay Shah, bridegroom of Devika Sharma
- Bikramjeet Kanwarpal as Advocate Gautam Shah
- Shah Rukh Khan as Raj Malhotra - Guest appearance in the song "Mast Kalandar”
- Anupam Kher as Dharamvir Malhotra - Guest appearance in the song "Mast Kalandar”

Guest appearance in title song (in order of appearance)

- Malaika Arora
- Celina Jaitly
- Minissha Lamba
- Amrita Rao
- Tara Sharma
- Neha Dhupia
- Dia Mirza
- Ameesha Patel
- Sophie Choudry
- Masumeh Makhija
- Koena Mitra
- Riya Sen
- Amrita Arora
- Shamita Shetty

== Production ==
Filming began on 26 January 2007 and ended in May 2007. Most of the shooting took place in Australia, while some was in Filmistan Studio in Mumbai. An Australian features in a promotional video which was not to be in the film. The girl band from Sydney are called the Girlband.

== Soundtrack ==
Heyy Babyy

Studio album by Shankar–Ehsaan–Loy
- Released: 17 July 2007 (India)
- Genre: Feature film soundtrack
- Label: T-Series Zee Music Company
- Producer: Shankar–Ehsaan–Loy

Shankar–Ehsaan–Loy chronology
Johnny Gaddaar (2007)	Heyy Babyy (2007)	Taare Zameen Par (2007)

The film's music is composed by Shankar–Ehsaan–Loy with lyrics penned by Sameer.

No.	Title	Artist(s)	Length
1.	"Heyy Babyy"	Neeraj Shridhar, Pervez Quadri, Raman Mahadevan	4:39
2.	"Dholna"	Sonu Nigam, Shreya Ghoshal	4:01
3.	"Mast Kalandar"	Rehan Khan, Master Saleem, Shankar Mahadevan	5:48
4.	"Heyy Babyy"	Akbar Sami, Girlband	4:03
5.	"Jaane Bhi De"	Shankar Mahadevan, Loy Mendonsa	3:56
6.	"Meri Duniya Tu Hi Re"	Sonu Nigam, Shaan, Shankar Mahadevan	5:49
7.	"Dholna" (Love Is in the Air Remix)	Sonu Nigam, Shreya Ghoshal	4:22
8.	"Heyy Babyy" (The Big 'O' Remix)	Neeraj Shridhar, Pervez Quadri, Raman Mahadevan, Loy Mendonsa	5:28
9.	"Jaane Bhi De" (Hiphop Hiccup Remix)	Shankar Mahadevan, Loy Mendonsa	4:16
Total length:			42:22

=== Reception ===
The album received favourable reviews from major critics. Joginder Tuteja of Bollywood Hungama in his four-star review, said that the album is a "must-buy": "The music score of Heyy Babyy is undoubtedly the best soundtrack of the year so far. Every track is a gem in its own way." Sukanya Verma of Rediff described the album as "a peppy soundtrack".

The album made its debut at No. 6 in the charts, later climbed up to the top 5 and remained consistent in the middle of the charts. According to the Indian trade website Box Office India, with around 12,00,000 units sold, this film's soundtrack album was the year's tenth highest-selling.

== Reception ==
=== Reviews ===
Taran Adarsh of IndiaFM gave the film four out of five stars saying it "is an entertainer that has something for everyone". He praised the performances of the lead stars.

Conversely, Raha Sen of Rediff.com gave the film a negative review, writing, "Sajid, dude, make a Borat-style film with Kishan Jhuthani. Or try horror shorts like in Darna Zaroori Hai. This moronic film is less than you're capable of. Far less."

=== Box office ===
Heyy Babyy opened to packed houses in over 650 cinemas in India. The opening was at 90%+ and continued to do well in the days following. It grossed ₹500 million (US$5.2 million) in India, $1.4 million in the US and £763,000 in the UK and was declared a "super-hit".

It was a hit abroad, opening to a favorable response and taking the second biggest Hindi film opening in the UK after Salaam-e-Ishq: A Tribute to Love (2007). Heyy Babyy debuted at number 10 and made £289,761 at a screen average of £4,765.
