= The Run (film) =

2017 documentary film directed by Anupam Sharma

- Directed by: Anupam Sharma
- Produced by: Anupam Sharma; Deepti Sachdeva; Penny Robbins
- Starring: Pat Farmer
- Cinematography: Kush Badhwar; Pooja Sharma
- Edited by: Shweta Rai
- Release date: 2017
- Language: English

The Run is a 2017 documentary film. It was produced and directed by Anupam Sharma-Films and Casting TEMPLE pty ltd, and won the Best Documentary award at the 2018 Newcastle International Film Festival in Newcastle, England.

== Synopsis ==
Pat Farmer retired from the Australian Parliament in 2010 to focus on charity marathon running. The run begin on 26 January 2015, which is not just India's Republic Day but also Australia Day. Ultramarathon runner Pat Farmer finished his Spirit of India trek in 64 days on the road through extreme heat, cold, snow, and rain while dodging cattle and nearly collapsing from dehydration. The multiple-record-holder ran through towns, villages, cities, deserts, highways, jungles and mountains. An Australian and Indian film crew followed Mr. Farmer and his team as they traversed the Indian subcontinent thanks to the support from the Indian Government and Ministry of Tourism. Pat raised money for the children in India through the Nanhi Kali Foundation, a cause very close to his heart. The run is supported by Ministries of Tourism and External Affairs, state tourism departments of various states, Indian Association of Tour Operators (IATO) and Federation of Hotels & Restaurants Association of India (FHRAI), among others.

== Reception ==
The film premiered at Parliament House in November 2017.

As part of the Newcastle International Film Festival, the film screened at Cineworld in April 2018, winning the Best Documentary award.

The Run premiered in UK on 6 September 2019.

== Review ==
- 4 Star review by Simon Foster of Screen Space.
- Review by The Guardian
