= Brand Bollywood Downunder =

2023 Australian documentary film about Bollywood's global influence

- Directed by: Anupam Sharma
- Written by: Anupam Sharma; Karin Steininger
- Produced by: Anupam Sharma; Claire Haywood; Deepti Sachdeva
- Starring: Farhan Akhtar; Ted BaillieuFardeen Khan; Anupam Kher; Anupam Sharma; Manpreet Kaur Singh (SBS Punjabi)
- Narrated by: Female voice as the personification of "India"
- Cinematography: Casimir Dickson, Susan Lumsdon, Aaakash Subramanium, Gaganpreet Singh
- Edited by: Karin Steininger
- Music by: Brett Aplin; Dmitri Golovko; Burkhard von Dallwitz
- Production companies: Films & Casting Temple Ltd
- Distributed by: Pivot Pictures
- Release date: November 2, 2023 (Australia)
- Running time: 93 minutes
- Country: Australia
- Language: English
- Budget: A$2.3 million

Brand Bollywood Downunder is a 2023 Australian feature documentary directed by Anupam Sharma that examines the globalisation of Bollywood with a focus on its cultural and cinematic connections with Australia from 1897 to 2023.

The film features interviews with actors and filmmakers including Farhan Akhtar, Fardeen Khan, Harman Baweja, and Anupam Kher, alongside archival footage and behind-the-scenes material. It premiered in Australia on 2 November 2023, was released on over 39 screens nationally, and became available on Netflix Australia and New Zealand on 1 August 2024.

== Synopsis ==
Narrated by a female voice representing "India", the documentary explores the phenomenon of "Bollywoodisation"—the spread of Hindi-language cinema's aesthetics, storytelling, music, and dance into global film culture.

It charts Bollywood’s connections with Australia over more than a century, from the first screenings of Indian films in 1897 to modern collaborations. The film also contrasts the production styles of the two countries, highlighting cultural differences and the shared passion for cinema.

Former Victorian Premier Ted Baillieu briefly discussed the journey of Bollywood in the state of Victoria, Australia. >

== Cast ==
Presented as themselves (in alphabetical order):

- Farhan Akhtar
- Ted Baillieu
- Aseem Bajaj
- Harman Baweja
- Ashutosh Gowariker
- Kunal Kapoor
- Fardeen Khan
- Anupam Kher
- Helen Leake
- Nasreen Munni Kabir
- Sajid Nadiadwala
- Vipul Amrutlal Shah
- Anupam Sharma
- Manpreet Kaur Singh (SBS Punjabi)
- Salim Merchant
- Leena Yadav

== Production ==
Brand Bollywood Downunder was produced by Films & Casting Temple Ltd with a cross-cultural crew. It received support from Screen Australia through the Producer Offset program. Filming took place in Australia, India, France, Switzerland, and the United Kingdom.

== Release ==
The film premiered at the Dendi Bollywood Film Festival on 5 November 2023, and was later screened at the Oxford International Film Festival, Byron Bay Film Festival, and the International Film Festival of India. Its European premiere took place at the UK Asian Film Festival (Tongues on Fire) in London, where it was hosted by the Indian High Commissioner at India House.

The film released on Netflix Australia and New Zealand on 1 August 2025. It is also available to stream on SBS On Demand.

== Reception ==
=== Critical response ===
Stage Whispers described the film as "a highly entertaining and informative look at Indian filmmaking culture… a must, whether you are a Bollywood newbie or dedicated follower". In The Australian, critic David Stratton called it "worth watching" for its historical perspective. ScreenHub Australia praised the historical content but found some stylistic choices distracting. Hush Hush Biz called it "an insightful exploration of Bollywood’s rich history" and its influence on global cinema.

=== Accolades ===
In May 2024, the film won the Flame Award for Best Documentary at the UK Asian Film Festival. The award was accepted by Manpreet Kaur Singh, a journalist and broadcaster who appears in the film.

== See also ==
- Cinema of Australia
- Cinema of India
- Bollywood
- List of Australian films of 2023
