= UnIndian =

2015 film by Anupam Sharma

unIndian
- Film poster
- Directed by: Anupam Sharma
- Written by: Thushy Sathi
- Produced by: Anupam Sharma; Lisa Duff
- Starring: Tannishtha Chatterjee; Brett Lee; Supriya Pathak; Akash Khurana
- Cinematography: Martin McGrath
- Edited by: Marcus D'Arcy
- Music by: Salim–Sulaiman; Amanda Brown
- Production company: Films and Casting TEMPLE pty ltd
- Release dates: 7 October 2015 (Sydney premiere); 19 August 2016 (India premiere)
- Country: Australia
- Languages: English; Hindi

UnIndian is a 2015 Australian romantic comedy film directed by Anupam Sharma and starring Brett Lee and Tannishtha Chatterjee. It was entirely shot in Sydney.

== Plot ==
The story is set in Sydney, in Australia where Will Henderson (Brett Lee), tall and blonde with a charming smile, who teaches Australian English to immigrants, falls in love with Meera (Tannishtha Chatterjee), a beautiful divorcee Australian woman of Indian origin and a single mother of a 10-year-old girl, Smitha. Meera is smart and independent and has carved out a successful life for herself and her daughter. Meera's ex-husband Deepak Khurana (Gulshan Grover) had earlier tried to lure and take away infant Smitha with him to India but was nabbed by the police after a complaint by Meera. While Meera's parents (Akash Khurana and Supriya Pathak) want to make a good match for her, she is not ready for any relationship. It takes a while before Meera is willing to take a risk by dating Will, despite family pressure to find 'a nice Indian match'; how the situation between Meera and Will develops through a series of ups and down is the focus of the narrative. In a dream sequence, Will sees himself dancing with Meera in an actual Bollywood movie (Sajid Nadiadwala's 2014 film Kick).

Smitha confides in Will that she wants to meet her father, to which Will responds by helping her to meet him. However, the clever Deepak hatches a plan to leave for India via New Zealand with Smitha. He almost succeeds but is nabbed by the police again after Will reveals to Meera his attempt to help Smitha. Meera lashes out at Will for his folly and tells him that Deepak is gay and a very mean, self-centered man who has no real interest in his daughter's welfare. Police are informed and block Sydney Airport and railway station, ultimately stopping Deepak at the port where he was planning to escape by ship with Smitha. After some misunderstanding, Will decides to quit his job and leave Sydney. Smitha asks her mother to stop Will from leaving since he is a good man at heart. Meera agrees and rushes to the airport to stop Will but finds that the flight has already taken off. She returns home dejectedly but is surprised to find Will there with her parents and daughter Smitha waiting for her.

== Cast ==
- Brett Lee as Will Henderson
- Tannishtha Chatterjee as Meera
- Stephen Hunter as Detective Thompson
- Pallavi Sharda as Shanthi in a special appearance
- Gulshan Grover as Deepak Khurana, Meera's ex-husband
- Supriya Pathak as Savita, Meera's mother
- Akash Khurana as Ashok, Meera's dad
- Anupam Sharma as Swami
- Maya Sathiamoorthy as Smitha, Meera's daughter
- Sarah Roberts as Priya
- Arka Das as TK
- Nicholas Brown as Samir

== Soundtrack ==
UnIndian

Soundtrack album by Salim–Sulaiman, Amanda Brown
- Released: 19 August 2016
- Genre: Feature film soundtrack
- Length: 38:54
- Languages: Hindi, English
- Label: Zee Music Company

The soundtrack for UnIndian is composed by Salim–Sulaiman. The background score is composed by Amanda Brown. The music rights are acquired by Zee Music Company.

No.	Title	Music	Length
1.	"Gayatri Mantra"	Salim–Sulaiman	02:21
2.	"UnIndian Theme"	Amanda Brown	01:22
3.	"How to Pick up an Indian Girl"	Amanda Brown	00:55
4.	"Fagun Laya Re Holi"	Salim–Sulaiman	03:47
5.	"Coffee"	Amanda Brown	01:24
6.	"Icn (feat. Anandi Bhattacharya)"	Amanda Brown	01:09
7.	"Judaiyaan"	Salim–Sulaiman	03:14
8.	"Detective Mum"	Amanda Brown	00:59
9.	"Smitha s Fear"	Amanda Brown	01:02
10.	"Chase Sequence"	Salim–Sulaiman	04:54
11.	"I Love Your Mum"	Amanda Brown	01:29
12.	"Soona Aangan"	Gul Hora	04:32
13.	"Smitha & Meera in Car"	Amanda Brown	01:07
14.	"Final Chase – Netball Scene"	Salim–Sulaiman	02:09
15.	"Hari Om Hari"	Salim–Sulaiman	03:27
16.	"In My Shoes"	White Shoe Theory	03:15
17.	"TK's Slideshow"	Amanda Brown	01:48
Total length:			38:54

== Review ==
- 3.5 stars by Times Of India
- 3.5 stars by Arts & Culture
- 3 stars by Bollywoodlife.com
- 2.5 stars by The Indian Express
- 2.5 stars by News18.com
- 2 stars by Hindustan Times
- 2 stars by Deccan Chronicle
