= Anupam Sharma =

Professional Cricketer, Student and coder

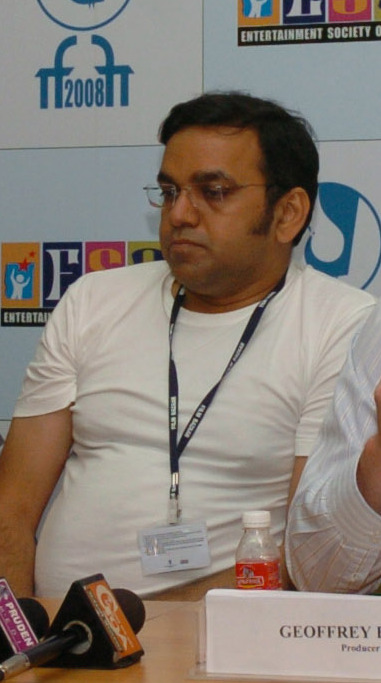
- Sharma at IFFI 2008
- Born: 17 January; Ajmer, Rajasthan, India
- Occupations: Film director, actor, film producer, author

Anupam Sharma is an Australian filmmaker, speaker and author.

Sharma has worked on several Bollywood productions filmed in Australia, including Dil Chahta Hai (2001), Love Story 2050, We Are Family, Orange and Heyy Babyy (2007).

He is the director of the Australian feature film unIndian, starring Australian cricketer Brett Lee, released in 2015. In 2014 the film was announced by Australian Prime Minister Tony Abbott. As a director apart from UnIndian he has also directed Indian Aussies (Terms & Conditions Apply), NSW Tourism Ad Campaign, Intellectual Property Awareness Foundation anti-piracy campaign and Australian feature documentary The Run.

== Personal life ==
Anupam Sharma was born in Ajmer, in the Indian state of Rajasthan. He attended high school at St. Joseph Academy in Dehradun, after which he moved to Australia to pursue a bachelor's degree in film. He followed his bachelor's degree with a master's degree in Films & Theatre from the University of New South Wales, where he wrote his thesis on Indian Cinema with Distinction.

He is married with two children.

== Career ==
Anupam Sharma was involved with a series of film and theatre projects in Sydney until he met Feroz Khan in 1998. In 2000, he founded Films and Casting Temple, a film production, casting and consulting company based at Fox Studios, Sydney. Over 25 years, the company has been involved in over 410 film, television, advertising and other screen sector related projects across India and Australia. With the support of Ausfilm, state agencies and companies such as Atlab (now Deluxe), Cutting Edge and The Post Lounge, he started seminars in India, to inform filmmakers about how to use Australian locations and production services in their films.

The Australia-India Film, Arts, Media, and Entertainment Council was formed in Sydney at the end of 2003, under the umbrella of the Australia-India Business Council. The council is headed by Anupam Sharma and enjoys significant co-operation from AusFilm and several state film agencies. In 2003 Sharma line produced Janasheen. In 2001, Anupam Sharma consulted on the Art Department of Baz Luhrmann, 'Moulin Rouge' starring Nicole Kidman on Indian elements. Sharma was the Australian Line producer for Heyy Babyy, which was shot in Sydney and MTV Roadies featured regional New South Wales, which became the highest rating ever on Indian TV in the youth music genre in 2009. It was produced in Australia by Film and Casting TEMPLE.

In 2004, a delegation composed of key players from the Australian entertainment industry including Producer John Winter (Rabbit Proof Fence, Doing Time for Patsy Cline) who was also heading the delegation, Steve Cooper, M.D of the multi-award-winning Australian post-production company, BEEPS, and Shireen Ardeshir from IDP Education supported by The Australia India Business Council (AIBC) and its film chapter the Australia India Film Arts Media and Entertainment (FAME) Council, along with ausFILM, Australian Film Commission, and various State film bodies initiated by Anupam Sharma owner of Sydney-based production company Films and Casting TEMPLE pty ltd In March 2004, Sharma participated in a delegation at FRAMES 2004, a convention on the entertainment business held in Mumbai. He attended as part of a group supported by AusFilm, the Australia India Business Council, and various state film bodies. .

In 2011, he teamed with film veteran Peter Castaldi and launched An Australian Film Initiative AAFI, to market and promote Australian screen culture in non-traditional markets. In 2011, Sharma and Peter Castaldi co-founded the Australian Film Initiative to promote Australian cinema in India. The initiative featured retrospectives of Australian directors, including Baz Luhrmann (2012–13) and Phillip Noyce (2014–15), and was supported by public figures such as Hugh Jackman. . In 2011 Anupam was on the list of the 50 most powerful and influential professionals in the Australian film industry.

In 2012, Sharma was selected as the head judge for the Special Broadcasting Service (SBS) TV series Bollywood Star. The four-part series follows the search for an Australian Bollywood star, who would go on to win a part in a Bollywood movie. Sharma was termed the Bollywood Czar of Australia, by broadcaster Geire Kami. He was also called the most high-profile Indian film professional in Australia, by Screen International. Also in 2012, he was appointed Australia Day Ambassador for his work in films between Australia and India, an appointment he has been receiving every year since 2013. In 2013, Sharma was commissioned to direct a film by the Australian National Maritime Museum. Titled Indian Aussies – terms & conditions apply, the short tongue-in-cheek documentary humorously explores various aspects of being an Indian Australian.

Sharma directed a series of television commercials for Destination NSW, which were rolled out throughout 2014. In 2014, Sharma directed a series of television commercials for Destination NSW, promoting tourism in the state to Indian audiences. The campaign was one of the more prominent international marketing efforts launched by the NSW government during that period. . In August 2014 Anupam was appointed as the first ambassador of the Parramasala Arts Festival. The directorial debut by Anupam, UNindian starring Tannishtha Chatterjee and Brett Lee released in October 2015 in Australia and August 2016 in India. Anupam then produced and directed a Sharma later produced and directed a documentary titled *The Run*, which follows ultra-marathon athlete Pat Farmer's long-distance fundraising run through India. The Run. As of 2025, Sharma is involved in the development of multiple Indian-Australian film projects, including narratives exploring diaspora identity and cross-cultural themes. . By 2025, Sharma had led more than 410 screen projects through Films and Casting TEMPLE, spanning feature films, television commercials, festival initiatives, and government delegations between Australia and India.

In 2025, Sharma founded and served as Festival Director of the inaugural National Indian Film Festival of Australia (NIFFA), which ran over 18 days from mid-February to early March across seven Australian cities (Sydney, Melbourne, Brisbane, Gold Coast, Perth, Adelaide, and Canberra). The program featured over 40 films, including 36 Australian premieres and 3 world premieres, across multiple languages and genres. NIFFA also initiated a regional expansion plan to bring screenings outside capital cities.

Sharma emphasised that NIFFA's mission is to present Indian and South Asian cinema in a culturally authentic way, allowing creatives to "tell their story themselves… rather than external agents parachuting" in. The festival has been praised for breaking Bollywood stereotypes by programming regional films and documentaries. The first is a called Honour and the other is a documentary called Bollywood Downunder – showcased at Cannes 2022. The documentary, which includes stars such as Farhan Akhtar, Anupam Kher, Ritesh Sidhwani, Srishti Behl, Siddharth Roy Kapur, Fardeen Khan, and Ashutosh Gowariker is being edited by Karin Steininger(editor of Oscar, Emmy winning and Bafta nominated 'Remembering Anne frank'.

== Films ==
Acting:

- UnIndian (2015)
- Heyy Babyy (2007)
- Shukriya: Till Death Do Us Apart (2004)
- Get Rich Quick (2004)

Direction:

- The Run (2017)
- unIndian (2015)
- Indian Aussies: Terms & Conditions Apply (2013)

Writer:

- Indian Aussies: Terms & Conditions Apply (2013)

== Other work ==
- 2018: Audi Ad with Virat Kohli

== Themes and Industry Impact ==
Sharma was the only independent film maker who was invited and attended the Senate hearing for ratifying the 2023 Australia India audio visual co-production treaty has cited the 2023 Australia–India audiovisual co‑production treaty—which came into effect in November—as a pivotal milestone for bilateral filmmaking. He noted that the agreement created new opportunities for funding, distribution, and creative collaboration between the two countries.

In public commentary, Sharma has consistently advocated for empowering Indian diaspora creatives to tell their stories from within their own cultural space—"rather than having an external culture interpreting their lives."

His 2023 documentary, Brand Bollywood Downunder, received praise for chronicling the historical evolution of India–Australia film relations. Critics highlighted its strong archival research, while also noting some stylistic elements—such as the voiceover personifying India—as creatively bold but uneven.

== Television appearances ==
In 2012, Sharma appeared as a judge on the SBS reality series Bollywood Star, a four-part talent competition searching for an Australian actor to debut in a Bollywood film.

== Awards and honors ==
- Appointed as an Australia Day Ambassador every year since 2013
- Appointed as one of the FOMA Ambassadors
- The Run won the Best Documentary award at the Newcastle Film Festival
