= Swapna Patker =

Indian businesswoman and corporate trainer

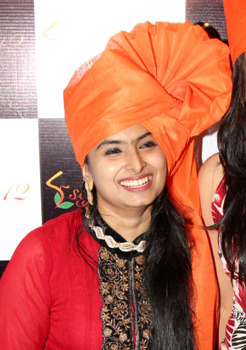
- Swapna Patker
- Born: Maharashtra, India
- Education: Indira Gandhi National Open University, University of Mumbai
- Occupations: Film producer, writer, entrepreneur
- Website: drswapnapatker.com, mindworkstrainingsystem.com

Swapna Patker is a corporate trainer and business woman better known for 2015 Marathi film Balkadu, a biopic of Shivsena founder Balasaheb Thackeray. She is chief managing director of The Royal Maratha Entertainment, a film production company. She is the founder and editor of TNG Times, an online news portal that covers stories related to politics, business, sports, and entertainment. Patker is author of Jeevan Funda, a Marathi language self-help book, published in 2013.

== Corporate Trainer ==
Patker is a corporate trainer, CBT and "wellness consultant" from Mumbai. She founded Mindworks Training Systems, a wellness clinic and online counseling, and training setup. Dr. Patker has expertise in children, adult and teenage counseling. She lays focus on emotion handling, addiction medicine and relationship counseling; and specializes in wellness training for children, parents and corporate. As a dream analyst, she guides you through the interpretation of your own dreams and their application to real-life problems with the use of cognitive (CBT) and emotive (REBT) therapies. She runs a life coaching practice in India.

== Writer ==
Besides mind training, Patker is active in other creative areas also. She is the author of book 'Jivanfunda'. She did writing for 'Corporate India' a magazine covering the corporate every month through an eye lens of finance & industry growth. She even wrote a Harvard Business review on 'India & Business'. She used to write columns named 'Corporate Mantra' & 'Athavdyacha Manus' in Dainik Samana.

== Producer ==
In 2015, Under the banner of The Royal Maratha Entertainment, Patker produced a Marathi language film Balkadu, which is biopic of late Balasaheb Thackeray. She also wrote lyrics for the film.

== Hotelier ==
As a woman entrepreneur, She founded Saffron 12, a multi-cuisine and fine-dining family restaurant in Mumbai. At the launch of Saffron 12, on 12 March 2013, Sanjay Dutt, Bappi Lahiri, Hrishitaa Bhatt, Mudasir Ali, Tajdar Amrohi, Suresh Wadkar and wife Padma, Dalip Tahil, Gary Richardson and Murli Sharma were among the guests spotted.

== Personal life ==
On 8 June 2021 she was arrested in fake medical degree case by Bandra police in Mumbai. Patker alleged the arrest to be a "revenge arrest" because she had filed a case in which she alleged being stalked by particular individuals "allegedly at the behest of Shiv Sena Member of Parliament Sanjay Raut." Bombay high court granted bail to Patker on 27 June 2021.
