= Tannishtha Chatterjee =

Indian film actress and director

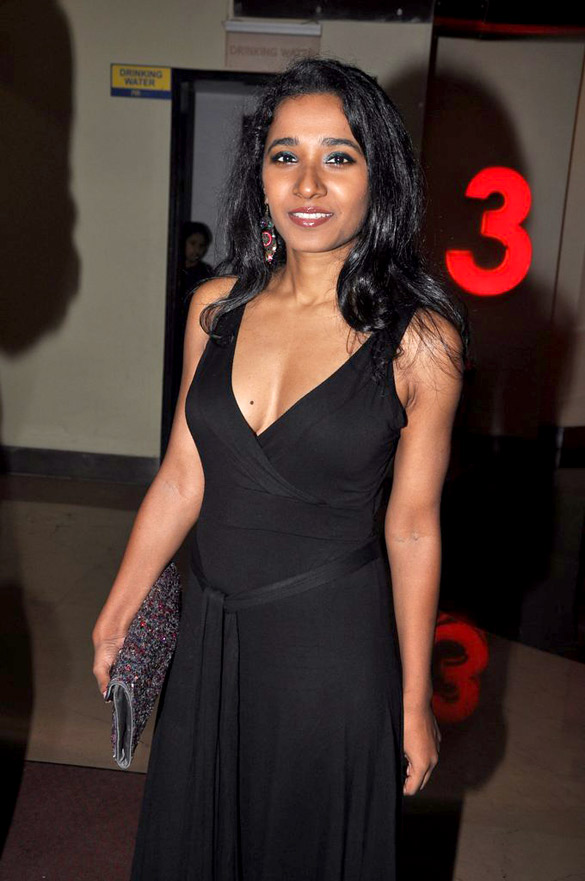
- Chatterjee at the premiere of The Forest on 11 May 2012
- Born: 23 November 1980 (age 45); Pune, Maharashtra, India
- Education: National School of Drama
- Occupation: Film actress
- Years active: 2003–present

Tannishtha Chatterjee (Bengali pronunciation: [tonːiʃʈʰa t͡ʃaʈard͡ʒi]) (born 23 November 1980) is an Indian actress, director and film maker who is known for her work in several Hindi and English independent films. For her performance in the film Dekh Indian Circus, she won the National Film Award – Special Jury Award / Special Mention (Feature Film). In 2019 she directed her first feature film Roam Rome Mein which screened at Toronto International Film Festival. Chatterjee's performance in the German film Shadows of Time earned her critical acclaim. It took her to international film festivals, including the Toronto International Film Festival and the Berlin International Film Festival.

She is also known in the west for her performance in the British film Brick Lane (2007), the film adaptation of Monica Ali's best selling novel of the same name for which she was nominated best actress at the British Independent Film Awards. Her other notable roles have been in Academy Award-winning German director Florian Gallenberger's film Shadows of Time, Road, Movie with Abhay Deol, Dekh Indian Circus, and Marathi film Doctor Rakhmabai for which she has won the Best Actress Award at RIFF (Rajasthan International Film Festival) and PIFF (Pune International Film Festival).

== Personal life ==
Chatterjee was born on 23 November 1980 in Pune, Maharashtra, to a Bengali Hindu family. Her father was a business executive and her mother was a political science professor. Her family traveled and lived out of the country for some time, then moved to Delhi. She majored in Chemistry at Delhi University before entering the National School of Drama.

Chatterjee is unmarried and has adopted a girl child, to raise her as a single mother.

== Career ==
Chatterjee's performance in the German film Shadows of Time earned her critical acclaim. It took her to international film festivals, including the Toronto International Film Festival and the Berlin International Film Festival. Thereafter she worked on an Indo-French coproduction Hava Aney Dey (Let the Wind Blow) directed by Partho Sen-Gupta which premiered at the Berlin International Film Festival and won the best film award at the Durban International Film Festival among others. Following these, Chatterjee acted in Strings, Kasturi and the Bengali film Bibar, winning critical acclaim and best actress awards. Her work in the British film Brick Lane directed by Sarah Gavron gave her international exposure and recognition. Chatterjee was nominated for the British independent film awards along with actresses Judi Dench and Anne Hathaway.

Chatterjee played a major role in Bhopal: Prayer for Rain in which she starred with Martin Sheen. She was the lead in Road, Movie with Abhay Deol and as earned the moniker Princess of Parallel Cinema in the Indian press. Chatterjee was referred by the Indian media as the chief flag bearer at the 62nd Cannes Film Festival. She starred in the 2009 film Bombay Summer. She was the lead in Lucy Liu's film Meena based on the book Half the Sky.

A trained Hindustani classical vocalist, she sang in the movies Road, Page 3, among others. She sang at the Royal Opera House in London with British composer Jocelyn Pook.

Chatterjee was a member of the jury at the 2010 Asia Pacific Screen Awards. She appeared in a T series film I Love New Year opposite Sunny Deol directed by Radhika Rao and Vinay Sapru.

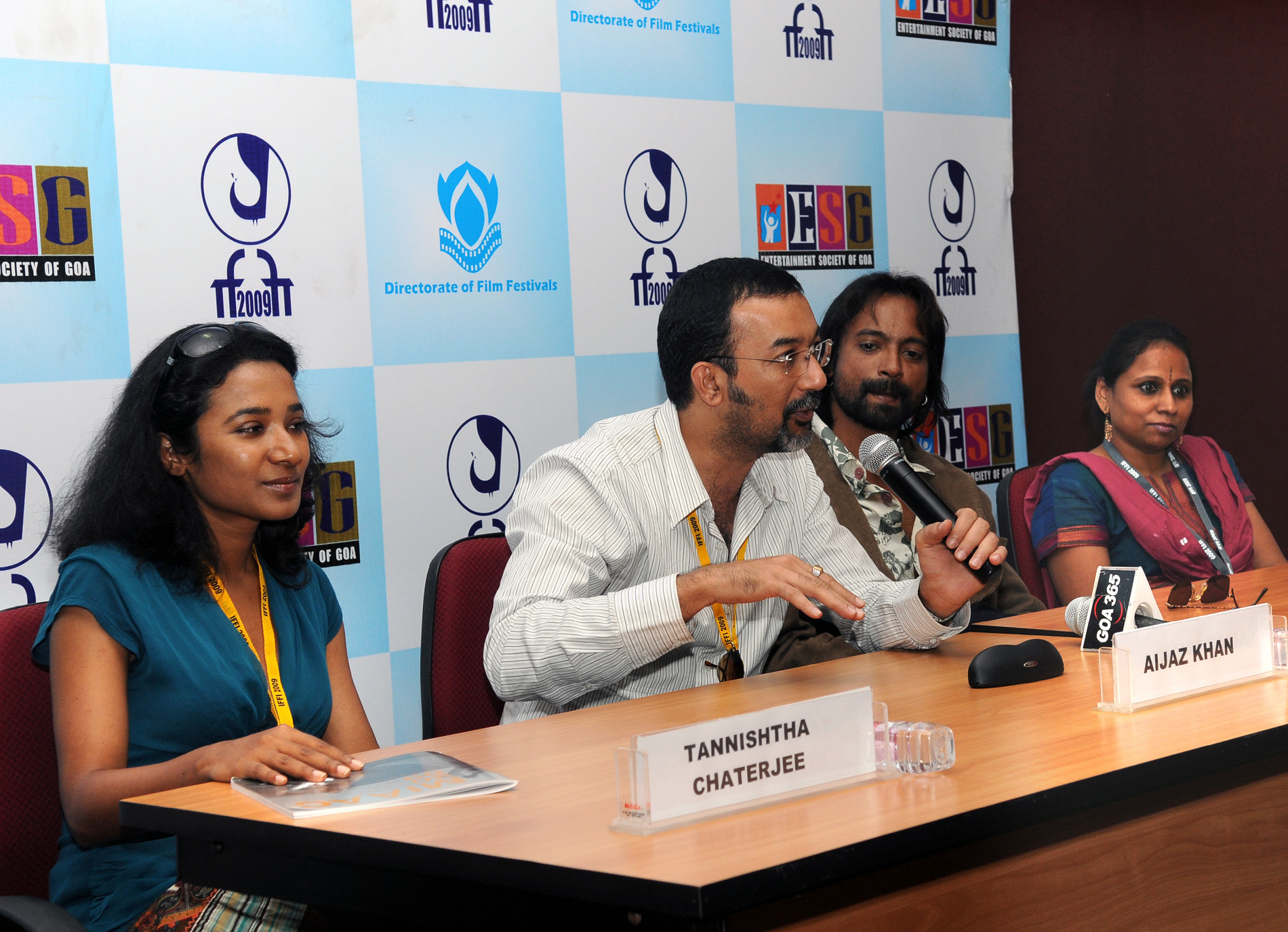
Tannishtha Chatterjee (left), IFFI (2009)

Tannishtha's Canadian film Siddharth was in official selection at the 70th Venice Film Festival and the 2013 Toronto International Film Festival. She is the only Indian actress whose films have been selected in three of the major international film festivals in the same year. Her other notable projects are Parched directed by Leena Yadav which opened in Toronto, Australian romantic comedy Unindian with Brett Lee Island City which won the best debut director( Ruchika Oberoi) in Venice and Garth Davies's film LION co-starring Nicole Kidman and Dev Patel. Her film Angry Indian Goddesses received acclaim in Toronto and Rome international film festivals. In March 2016 Tannishtha was given a special award in a ceremony held at the BAFTA for her contribution to Asian Cinema. She won the best actress for the film Parched along with three other actresses in Festival 2 Valenciennes and the Indian Film Festival of Los Angeles 2016. She was the president of the jury of the MOOOV film festival in Belgium in 2016. She won the best actress at the Pune International Film Festival 2017 for her role in Dr. Rakhmabai. In 2019 Tannishtha made her directorial Debut Roam Rome Mein which had its World premier at Busan International Film Festival where she won the Asia Star Award.

In 2025, her second directorial film Full Plate had its World premier at 30th Busan International Film Festival on 18 September 2025 and won Tannishtha the Visionary director award.

== Activism ==
Tannishtha speaks quite often on the issue of race/colorism in Indian media. She has walked out during a roast when her skin color was the subject of jokes. She explored racism in Indian film and TV industry on Mithaq Kazimi's talk show series. Personally, she adopted a baby girl and has encouraged others to do the same.

== Filmography ==
=== Films ===
Year	Film	Role	Notes
2003	Swaraj		
2004	Bas Yun Hi	Sona	
2004	Hava Aney Dey	Mona	
2005	Shadows of Time	Masha	
2005	Divorce	Kamla	
2006	Bibar	Nita	Won Best Actress Bengal Film Journalists' Association, Osian Film Festival
2006	Strings-Bound By Faith		
2007	Brick Lane	Nazneen Ahmed	Nominated-British Independent Film Awards Best Actress
2008	White Elephant	Sita	
2009	Barah Aana	Rani	
2009	Bombay Summer	Geetha	
2010	Road, Movie	Gypsy woman	
2012	Jal	Kajri	
2012	Jalpari: The Desert Mermaid	Shabri	
2012	Anna Karenina	Masha	
2013	Dekh Indian Circus	Kajaro	Won—National Film Award – Special Jury Award / Special Mention (Feature Film)
2013	Gulaab Gang	Kajri	
2013	Monsoon Shootout	Rani	
2013	Siddharth	Suman Saini	
2013	Bhopal: Prayer for Rain	Leela	
2014	Sunrise	Leela	
2014	Chauranga	Dhaniya	
2015	I Love New Year	Riya	
2015	Feast of Varanasi	Inspector Rajveer Saxena	
2015	Rough Book	Santoshi	
2015	Parched	Rani	Won Indian Film Festival of Los Angeles Best Actress
2015	Angry Indian Goddesses	Nargis Nasreen	
2015	Gour Hari Dastaan	Anita	
2016	Lion	Noor	
2016	Unindian	Meera	
2016	Doctor Rakhmabai	Doctor Rakhmabai	Won— Best Actress Pune International Film Festival; Won— Best Actress Rajasthan International Film Festival; Nominated— Best Actress Maharashtra State Film Awards; Nominated— Best Actress 17th New York Indian Film Festival
2018	Beyond the Clouds	Chotu's mom	
2019	Rani Rani Rani	Rani	
2019	Jhalki	Priti Vyas	
2019	Roam Rome Mein	Reena	Also director Asia Star Award Busan International Film Festival
2020	Unpaused	—	Director
2022	Dahini: The Witch	Kamala	
2023	Joram	Vaano	
2025	The Storyteller	Suzie Fibert	
2025	Full Plate	—	Director Won- Visionary director award Busan International Film FestivalWon-Peoples choice award, Critics special mention Vesoul International Film Festival

=== Web series ===
Year	Title	Role	Platform	Notes
2019	Parchhayee	Lavani	ZEE5	
2021	Cartel	Romilla	Alt Balaji	
2022	Modern Love Mumbai	Rayman	Amazon Prime Video	1 episode
2023	Scoop	Leena Pradhan	Netflix	
2025	Bindiya Ke Bahubali	Imali Davan	Amazon MX Player	
2026	Bindiya Ke Bahubali Season 2	Imali Davan	Amazon MX Player	

== Awards ==
Year	Function	Award Nomination	Film	Status
2006	Osian film festival	Best Actress	Bibar	Won
2007	British Independent Film Awards 2007	Best Actress	Brick Lane	Nominated
2007	Bengal Film Journalists' Association	Most Promising Actress	Bibar	Won
2009	Mahindra Indo-American Arts Council	Best Actress	Bombay Summer	Won
2010	Stardust Award	Best Actress	Road, Movie	Nominated
2012	NYIFF Indo-American Arts Council	Best Actress	Dekh Indian Circus	Won
2012	National Film Award (Special Mention)	National Film Award	Dekh Indian Circus	Won
2016	London Asian Film Festival	Contribution to Asian Cinema		Won
2016	Festival2valenciennes	Best Actress	Parched	Won
2016	Indian Film Festival of Los Angeles	Best Actress	Parched	Won
2016	Rajasthan International Film Festival	Best Actress	Doctor Rakhmabai	Won
2017	Pune International Film Festival	Best Actress	Doctor Rakhmabai	Won
2017	New York Indian Film Festival	Best Actress	Doctor Rakhmabai	Nominated
2017	Maharashtra State Film Awards	Best Actress	Doctor Rakhmabai	Nominated
2019	Busan International Film Festival	Asia Star Award	Roam Rome Mein	Won
2025	Busan International Film Festival	Visionary Director award	Full Plate	Won
2025	Vesoul International Film festival	Peoples choice award, Critics special Mention	Full Plate	Won
