= Bombay Legislative Council =

Former legislature in India

Bombay Legislative Council was the legislature of the Bombay Presidency and later the upper house of the bicameral legislature of Bombay State in British India and the Indian state of Bombay.

== History ==
The Indian Councils Act 1861 set up the Bombay Legislative Council as an advisory body through which the colonial administration obtained advice and assistance. The act empowered the provincial governor to nominate four non-English Indian members to the council for the first time. Under the act, the nominated members were allowed to move their own bills and vote on bills introduced in the council. However, they were not allowed to question the executive, move resolutions or examine the budget and not interfere with the laws passed by the Central Legislature. The governor was also the president of the council and he had complete authority over when, where and how long to convene the Council and what to discuss. Two members of his Executive Council and the Advocate-General of Bombay were also allowed to participate and vote in the council.

The first meeting of the erstwhile Legislative Council of the then Bombay Province was held on 22 January 1862 at the Durbar Hall of the Town Hall in Bombay. The meeting was then chaired by the then Governor, Sir George Russell Clerk. The first five Indian members of the council were chosen such that three of them did not know English.

The role of the council was expanded by the Indian Councils Act 1892 and increased the total number of members of the council to twenty. The non-official members were to be nominated from the Bombay Municipal Corporation, the Fellows of Bombay University, the Chamber of Commerce of Bombay, the Chamber of Commerce of Karachi, the zamindars of Sind, the sardars of the Deccan, the municipalities of the Northern Division, the local boards of the Southern Division and three representatives of the Central Division. The council could discuss the annual financial statement and ask questions subject to certain limitations.

The Indian Councils Act 1909 officially introduced the method of electing members to the council, but did not provide for direct election of the members. It abolished automatic official (executive) majorities in the council and gave its members the power to move resolutions upon matters of general public interest and the budget and also to ask supplementary questions.

Based on the recommendations of the Montague-Chelmsford report, the Government of India Act 1919 was enacted. The act enlarged the Bombay legislative council and increased the strength of elected members to be greater than that of nominated and official members. It introduced a system of dyarchy in the Provinces.

The Government of India Act 1935 abolished dyarchy and established provincial autonomy. It created a bicameral legislature in the Bombay province. The legislature consisted of the governor and two legislative bodies - a Legislative Assembly and a Legislative Council. The council was a permanent body not subject to dissolution by the governor and one-third of its members retired every three years.

After India became independent in 1947 and the Indian Constitution was adopted in 1950, the Legislative Council continued to be the upper chamber of the legislature of the Bombay State.

The legislature of Bombay State ceased to exist in 1960 after the bifurcation of Bombay into Maharashtra and Gujarat.

== List of members (1862–1909) ==
Year	Governor	Officials	Non-officials
1862–1867	Henry Bartle Frere	Walter Richard Cassels, M. R. Westropp, W. B. Tristram, General Sir William Mansfield, H. Reeves	Jaganath Shunkerseth (1862–1865), Nawab of Savanur Abdul Tabriz Khan Diler Jung Bahadur (1862), Rustomji Jamshetji Jejeebhoy, Sardar Madhavrao Vinchurkar, Seth Premabhai Hemchand, Mangaldas Nathubhoy (1866–1867), Parashuramrao Shrinivas of Aundh State (1866–1867)
1867–1872	Seymour Vesey-FitzGerald	Sir Alexander Grant (1868), Andrew Scoble (1870–1877)	Parashuramrao Shrinivas of Aundh State (1867–1868), Mangaldas Nathubhoy (1867–1872), Albert Abdullah David Sassoon (1868–1872), Framjee Nasarwanjee Patel, Sir Jamsetjee Jejeebhoy, 2nd Baronet
1872–1877	Sir Philip Wodehouse	Andrew Scoble (1870–1877), Charles Staveley	Mangaldas Nathubhoy (1872–1874), Sir Jamsetjee Jejeebhoy, 2nd Baronet, Narayan Vasudev Dabholkar (1872–1877), Vishwanath Narayan Mandlik (1874–1880), Padamji Pestanji (1874–1876), Sorabji Shapurji Bengali (1876), Dosabhai Framji Karaka (1877), Sir Jamsetjee Jejeebhoy, 3rd Baronet, Nakhuda Mohammad Ali Roghay, Bechardas Ambaidas Laskari
1877–1880	Richard Temple	Henry Warre, J. Gibbs, L. R. Ashburner, E. W. Ravenscroft, Col. C. J. Merriman, Col. W. C. Anderson, M. Balfour, M. Mowat	Dosabhai Framji Karaka (1877–1879), Narayan Vasudev Dabholkar (1877–1880), Vishwanath Narayan Mandlik (1877–1880), Madhoji Rao Janrao Naik Nimbalkar of Phaltan (1878–1880), Morarjee Goculdas (1879), Syud Hussan El Edroos (1879), Sir Jamsetjee Jejeebhoy, 3rd Baronet (1880)
1880–1885	James Fergusson	Henry Warre, L. R. Ashburner, E. W. Ravenscroft, Col. C. J. Merriman, Col. W. C. Anderson, James M. Graham	Sir Jamsetjee Jejeebhoy, 3rd Baronet (1880), Solomon David Sassoon (1880), Aga Khan II (1880), Gopal Hari Deshmukh (1880–1882), Vishwanath Narayan Mandlik (1880–1884), Narayan Vasudev Dabholkar (1880–1884), Rahimtulla M. Sayani (1880–1885), Badruddin Tyabji (1882–1886), Kashinath Trimbak Telang (1884), Sir Jaswanthsinghji Fatehsinghji of Limbdi State (1884), Khanderao Vishwanath Raste (1884–1885)
1885–1890	Lord Reay	J. B. Richey, Raymond West, Francis Law Latham, J. Macpherson, Frank Forbes Adam, J. R. Naylor	Mahadev Govind Ranade (1885–1886), Khanderao Vishwanath Raste (1885–1886), Rahimtulla M. Sayani (1885–1890), Dadabhai Naoroji (1885), Khan Bahadur Shahabuddin Kazi (1886), Pherozeshah Mehta (1887), Dinshaw Maneckji Petit (1888–1889), Jawansinghji of Idar State, Bechardas Veharidas Desai (1888), Kashinath Trimbak Telang, Mahadeo Vasudeo Barve
1890–1895	Lord Harris	Herbert Mills Birdwood, A. C. Trevor, Basil Lang, Sir R. West, Sir Charles Pritchard, T. D. Little, G. W. Vidal,	Mahadev Govind Ranade (1890–1891)(1893–1894), Rahimtulla M. Sayani (1894–1895), Dorabjee Padamjee, Ranchhodlal Chhotalal, Hassan Ali Effendi
1895–1900	Lord Sandhurst	John Nugent, Charles Ollivant, A. S. Moriarty, T. R. McLellan, R. H. Macaulay, E. Giles, H. M. Thompson, C. T. Burke, Andrew Wingate, W. C. Hughes, H. Batty, P. C. H. Snow, H. E. M. James, F. S. P. Lely, A. Abercombie, T. L. F. Beaumont, J. Tate, H. F. Aston, J. W. P. Muir-Mackenzie	Rahimtulla M. Sayani (1895–1896), Bal Gangadhar Tilak (1895–1897), Pherozeshah Mehta, Daji Abaji Khare, Chimanlal Harilal Setalvad, Mir Allahbakshkhan Shahwani Talpur, Gopal Krishna Gokhale (1899–1900), Dhondo Shamrao Garud, N. G. Chandavarkar, Vijbhukhandas Atmaram Mehta, Chunilal Venilal, Achyut Bhaskar Desai
1900–1903	Henry Northcote	Herbert Mills Birdwood, Charles Ollivant (1900–1902), Edmund McGildowny Hope Fulton (1902), James Monteath	Gopal Krishna Gokhale (1901), Pherozeshah Mehta, Sir Bhalchandra Krishna Bhatavdekar, Daji Abaji Khare, Gokuldas Parekh, Sardar Narayanrao Govindrao Ghorpade (Chief of Ichalkaranji), Shripad Anant Chhatre, Fazulbhoy Visram
1903–1907	Lord Lamington	James Monteath, John Muir Mackenzie, E. McG. H. Fulton, C. H. Armstrong, M. de P. Webb, W. H. White, E. Giles, J. L. Jenkins, R. A. Lamb, J. Tate, W. C. Hughes, Silas Meyer Moses	Mir Allahbakshkhan Shahwani Talpur (1903), Gokuldas Parekh (1903–1904), Ibrahim Rahimtoola (1903), Daji Abaji Khare (1903), Hari Sitaram Dikshit (1903–1904), Navroji Khandalavala (1903), Chimanlal Harilal Setalvad (1903–1904), Vithaldas Thackersey (1903–1904), Chintamanrao Patwardhan of Kurundvad Senior (1903–1904), Pherozeshah Mehta (1904), Darasha Chichgar (1904), R. G. Bhandarkar (1904), Ganpatrao Vinchurkar (1904)

== Indian Councils Act 1909 ==
The Indian Councils Act 1909 expanded the strength of the legislative council to 49 (including the Governor) and introduced the indirect election of members to the Council. The legislative council was composed of

- Ex-officio members (4): Executive council members (3) and the Advocate-General (1)
- Nominated members (21): Officials (up to 14), Experts (2) and Non-Officials
- Elected members (21): Bombay Municipal Corporation (1), Municipalities (4), University of Bombay (1), Landholders (3), Muslims (4), Bombay Chamber of Commerce (1), Karachi Chamber of Commerce (1), Millowners' associations of Bombay (1) and Ahmadabad (1) and the Indian commercial community (1).

Rafiuddin Ahmed, Sir Chinubhai Ranchhodlal, Lallubhai Samaldas (1910-1912), R. P. Paranjpye (1912-1915), Sir Gokuldas Parekh (1912-1915), Vithalbhai Patel (1913-1920), Dinshaw Edulji Wacha (1915), Balkrishna Sitaram Kamat, Wadero Ghulam Kadir Dayo,(1913-1920) and Chunilal Mehta (1916) were among the notable members.

== Government of India Act 1919 ==
The Government of India Act of 1919 which introduced the concept of diarchy in the province further enlarged the council and gave the elected members a majority.

The composition of the Council was as follows:

- Nominated Members
  - Ex-officio Members of the Governor's Executive Council
  - Nominated Officials (25)
  - Nominated from special interest groups (5): Anglo-Indians, Indian Christians, Labour, Depressed Classes, Cotton Trade
- Elected Members (86)
  - Non-Muhammadan (General) (46):
    - Urban (11): Bombay City (North) (3), Bombay City (South) (3), Karachi, Ahmedabad, Surat, Sholapur, Poona
    - Rural (35): Ahmedabad (2), Broach, Kaira (2), Panch Mahals, Surat (2), Thana (2), Ahmednagar (2), East Khandesh (3), Nasik (2), Poona (2), Satara (3), Belgaum (2), Bijapur, Dharwar (2), Kanara, Ratnagiri (2), Eastern Sind, Western Sind, Sholapur, Kolaba, West Khandesh
  - Muhammadan (27):
    - Urban (5): Bombay City (2), Karachi City, Ahmedabad & Surat, Poona & Sholapur
    - Rural (22): Northern Division (3), Central Division (3), Southern Division (3), Hyderabad (2), Karachi (2), Larkana (3), Sukkur (2), Thar & Parkar (2), Nawebshah, Upper Sind Frontier
  - European (2): Bombay City, Presidency
  - Landholders (3): Deccan Sardars, Gujarat Sardars, Sind Jagirdars & Zamindars
  - University (1): University of Bombay
  - Commerce & Industry (7): Bombay Chamber of Commerce (2), Karachi Chamber of Commerce, Bombay Trades Association, Bombay Millowners' Association, Ahmedabad Millowners' Association, Indian Merchants' Chamber & Bureau

7 of the constituencies were reserved for Marathas.

Indians were elected as the President of the Council such as N. G. Chandavarkar (1921-1923), Ibrahim Rahimtullah (1923) and Ali Muhammad Khan Dehlavi (1927).

== See also ==
- List of governors of Bombay Presidency
- 1937 Bombay Presidency election
- Bombay Legislative Assembly
