= Mama Parmanand =

Indian social reformer (1838–1893)

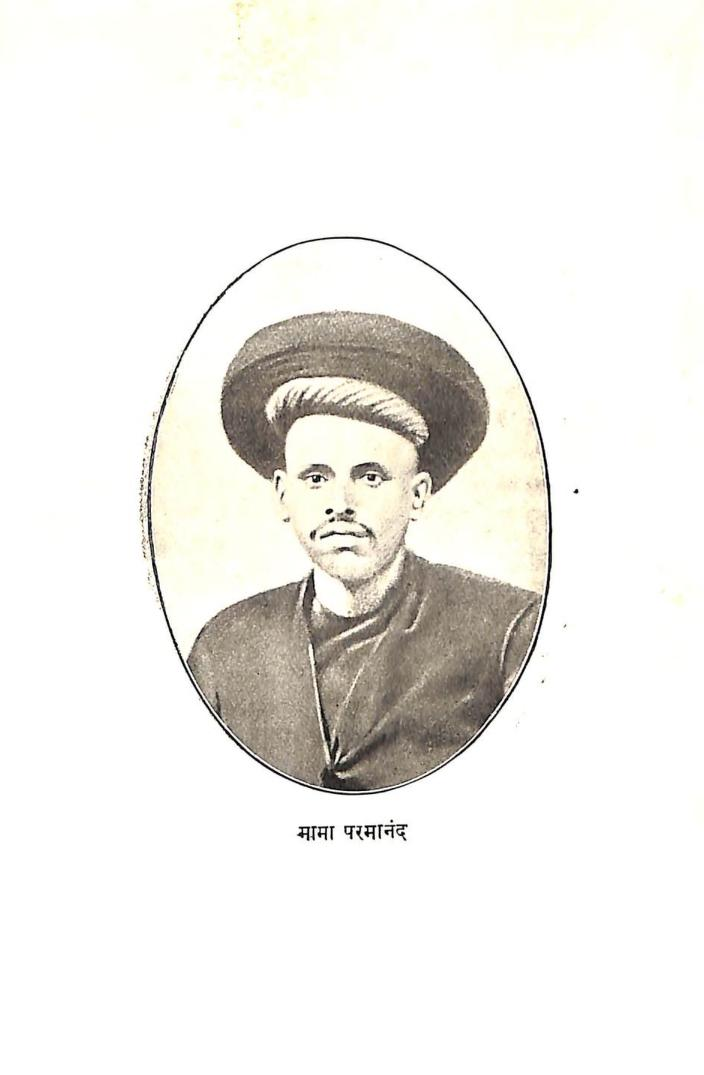
- Born: Narayan Mahadev Parmanand; 3 July 1838; Maungao, Sawantwadi, Konkan, India
- Died: 13 September 1893 (aged 55); Bombay, India
- Education: Elphinstone Institute, University of Mumbai
- Occupations: Social reformer, journalist, teacher, administrator
- Known for: Founding member of Prarthana Samaj, First editor of Native Opinion, Mentor to Kashinath Trimbak Telang
- Notable work: Pitrubodh (1877)
- Spouse: Jankibai

Mama Parmanand (3 July 1838 – 13 September 1893), born as Narayan Mahadev Parmanand, was an Indian social reformer, journalist, and a founding member of the Prarthana Samaj. Regarded by Mahadev Govind Ranade as a "Political Rishi" (Rajkiya Rishi), he served as a prominent advisor to several key figures of the Indian independence and reform movements.

== Early life and education ==
Parmanand was born on 3 July 1838 in the village of Maungao, located near Sawantwadi in the Konkan region. His father, Mahadev, died when Parmanand was only a year old. Raised by his mother, Gangabai, he received his primary education in his maternal uncle's village, where his mother supported the family by running a small shop. He later moved to Mumbai for further studies. He attended the Elphinstone Institute in Mumbai, where he was a distinguished student, earning the "West Scholarship" and the "Claire Scholarship". Parmanand gained a reputation as a scholar and cleared the matriculation examination following the establishment of the University of Mumbai. Although he initially enrolled for a B.A. degree, financial difficulties forced him to discontinue his studies and take up a teaching position at Elphinstone High School, where he worked from 1864 to 1868. During this time, he mentored students such as the researcher Kashinath Trimbak Telang.

== Career ==
Parmanand's professional life included roles in education, journalism, and government administration. After a brief period working in Sindh, he returned to Mumbai due to health concerns and transitioned from teaching to a career in writing and public service.

=== Journalism and writing ===
Parmanand was a prolific journalist and served as the first editor of the newspaper Native Opinion, which launched on 4 January 1864. He was also heavily involved with other influential publications, including Induprakash, Indian Spectator, and Subodh Patrika. He was a dedicated contributor to Subodh Patrika, the official mouthpiece of the Prarthana Samaj, and continued to write for the journal until his death, even while bedridden.

=== Administrative roles ===
Parmanand held several significant administrative positions:

- Naib Diwan: He served as the Naib Diwan (Deputy Collector) of the Cutch State, contributing to various administrative reforms before resigning due to political interference.
- Registrar: Following his return to Bombay, he was appointed as a Registrar at the Bombay High Court by William Wedderburn.
- Government Official: He also served as the Secretary of the Labor Department and as a Superintendent in the Revenue and General Departments. He later held the position of Secretary to the Municipality.

== Social reform and religious work ==
A core member and promoter of the Prarthana Samaj, which he joined in 1867, Parmanand believed that religious reform was a prerequisite for national progress. He founded the "Hindu Social Reform Association" and was a staunch advocate for widow remarriage. His home often served as a refuge for remarried couples and a gathering place for students and social activists. His reformist outlook was notably influenced by the biography of Benjamin Franklin.

== Influence and legacy ==
Parmanand was highly respected as a political thinker. In addition to Sayajirao Gaekwad III, William Wedderburn, and Mahadev Govind Ranade, his counsel was sought by leaders such as Badruddin Tyabji and Pherozeshah Mehta.

His book Pitrubodh, published in 1877 and dedicated to his father, was translated into English, Marathi, and Gujarati. He was supported in his social endeavors by his wife, Jankibai. Parmanand died in Mumbai on 13 September 1893.
