= Mangaldas Nathubhoy =

Indian politician (1832–1890)

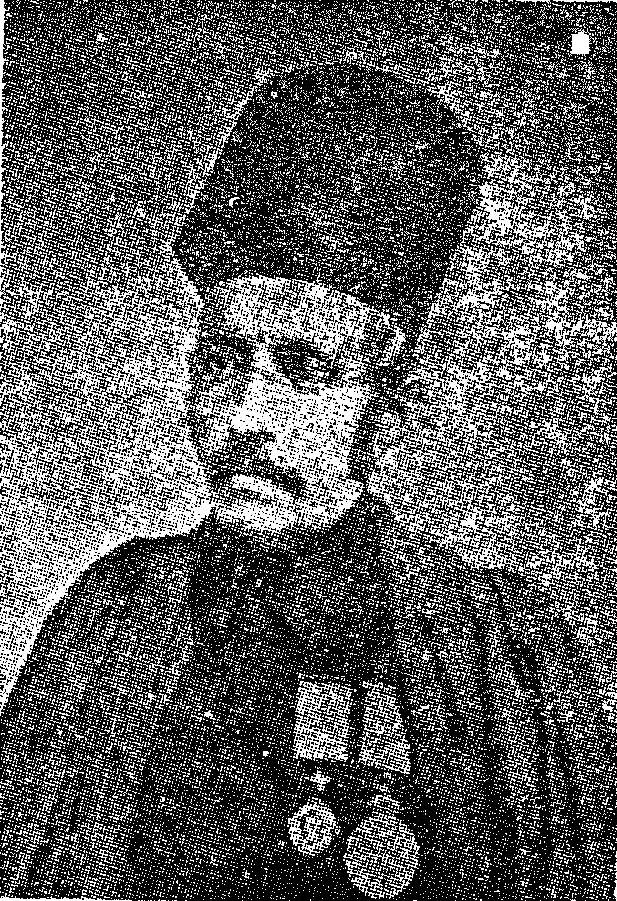
- Mangaldas Nathubhoy from Mahaapurushhula-jiivitamulu (page 204 crop)
- Born: 15 October 1832; Bombay, India
- Died: 9 March 1890 (aged 57)
- Occupations: Seth, businessman, and justice of the peace
- Known for: Seth or head of the Kapol Bania

Sir Mangaldas Nathubhoy (15 October 1832 – 9 March 1890) was the Seth or head of the Kapol Bania caste in India. The caste i.e. Kapols were well known for their thrift and keen commercial instincts.

== Early life ==
He was born of a family whose ancestors emigrated from Diu Goghla district to Bombay soon after Bombay came into British possession. Ramdas Manordas, his grandfather, amassed a considerable fortune, which, owing to the premature death of his father, came into the sole possession of Mangaldas at the age of eleven.

== Career ==
He had to take charge of the business in early life, though he gave some time to English studies. He was a noted cotton mill merchant and was agent of Bombay United Mill from 1860 to 1874, when he resigned and agency was given to Khatau Maccanji.

In 1859, Mangaldas was made a justice of the peace, and was appointed a Commissioner of Income Tax in 1860. In 1862, he assisted in establishing the Hindu Boys' School in Bombay, founded under the patronage of the Students' Literary and Scientific Society. In the same year, he founded a fellowship in Bombay university to allow graduates to spend some years in Europe. A bequest in his will enabled the university to establish seven similar scholarships. He took keen interest in learning, and in such institutions as the Asiatic and geographical societies.

== Personal life and recognition ==
On the death of Nathubhoy's wife in 1864, he established a dispensary at Kalyan in her memory and also a special female ward in connection with the David Sassoon hospital in Poona. As a merchant Mangaldas was upright and successful. In social matters he stood forth as a reformer, and to him the change to election from hereditary succession to the headship of the caste is due.

In 1866 he was nominated to the Bombay Legislative Council as a non-official member and sat until 1874. In 1867 he revived the Bombay Association, a political body, over which he presided for a time. In 1872 he was made CSI, and in 1875 the dignity of Knight Bachelor was conferred on him. Besides a large donation to the Indian Famine Fund, Sir Mangaldas is known to have expended 500,000 on charities. He died at Bombay on 9 March 1890.
