= Navnat =

Navnat (Nav = nine, nat = nyat or jnati) Jain community emerged as a result of blending of several smaller Jain communities in East Africa as well as in Gujarat itself in early 20th century.

The original communities include these Hindu or Jain communities Dasha Shrimal, Visha Shrimal, Dasha Sorathia, Visha Sorathia, Modh, Khadayata, Porvad, Kapol (or Kandol) and Shrimali Soni Mahajan. Historically several occurred several centuries ago, largely due to regional differences.

The Navnat Vanik Association of UK was founded in 1971. The term Vanik means merchant.
