= Sir Alexander Grant, 10th Baronet =

British landowner and historian

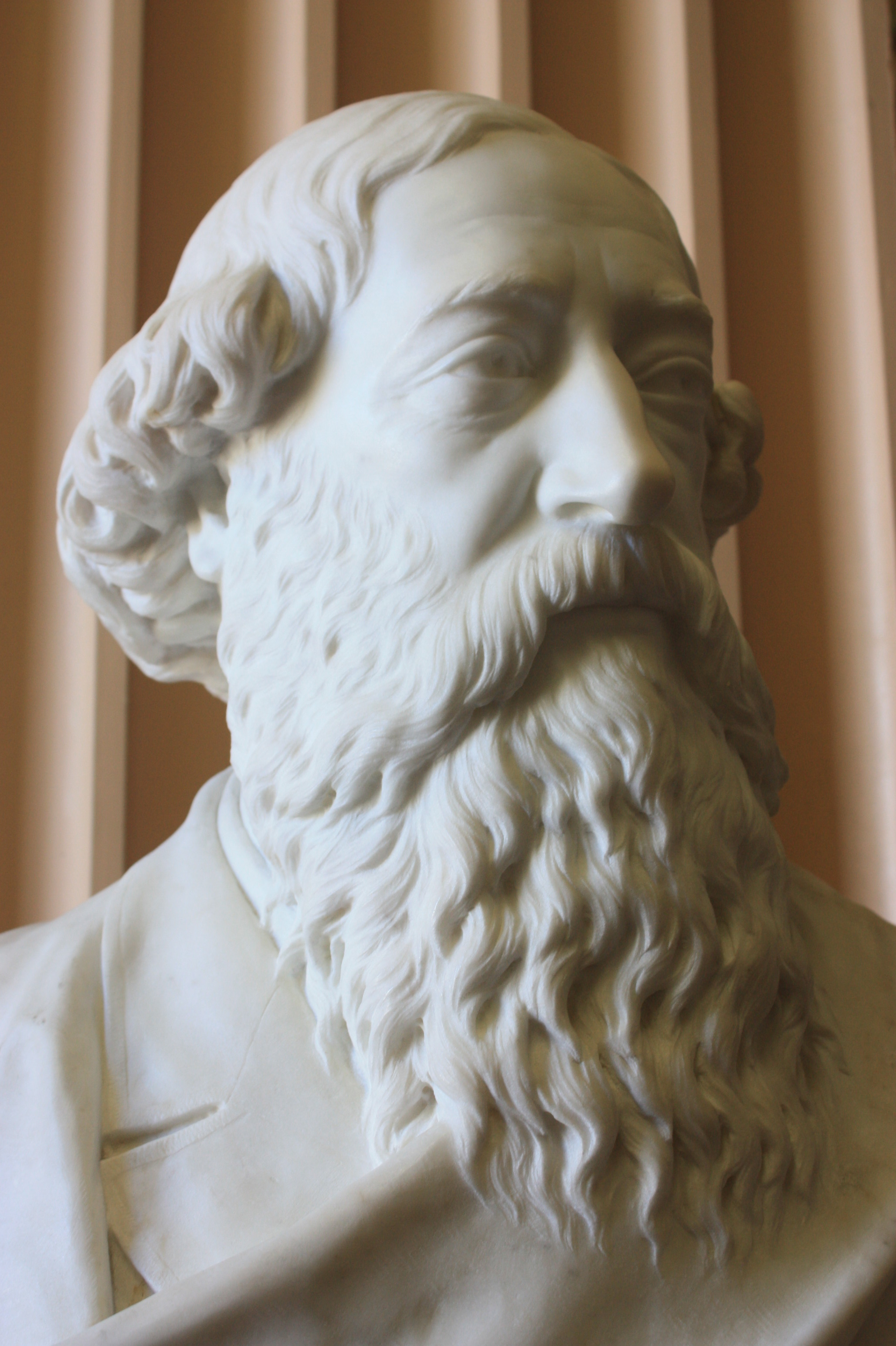
Bust of Sir Alexander Grant by Charles McBride, Old College, University of Edinburgh

Sir Alexander Grant, 10th Baronet, FRSE (23 September 1826 – 30 November 1884) was a British landowner and historian who served as Principal of the University of Edinburgh from 1868 to 1884. He had strong links to India, especially Bombay.

== Biography ==
=== Early life ===
He was born in New York City, the son of Sir Robert Innes Grant, 9th Baronet of Dalvey, and his wife, Judith Towers Battelle. His early education took place in America and the family then returned to Britain.

He was educated at Harrow School from 1839 to 1845 then went to Balliol College, Oxford graduating BA in 1848 and MA in 1852. He made a special study of the Aristotelian philosophy, and in 1857 published an edition of The Ethics of Aristotle: Illustrated with Essays and Notes (4th ed. 1885) which became a standard text-book at Oxford. In 1855 he was one of the examiners for the Indian Civil Service, and in 1856 a public examiner in classics at Oxford.

His father became 9th Baronet of Dalvey in 1854 on the death of his brother, Sir Alexander Grant, 8th Baronet. When his father died in 1856 Alexander became the 10th baronet.

=== India ===
In 1859 he went to Madras with Sir Charles Trevelyan, and was appointed inspector of schools; the next year he moved to Bombay, to fill the post of Professor of History and Political Economy in the Elphinstone College. Of this he became Principal in 1862; and, a year later, vice-chancellor of Bombay University, a post he held from 1863 to 1865 and again from 1865 to 1868. In 1865 he was appointed Director of Public Instruction for Bombay. In 1866 he served as Vice Chancellor of Bombay University. In 1868 he was appointed a Member of the Bombay Legislative Council. His students included Pherozeshah Mehta, Mahadev Govind Ranade, R. G. Bhandarkar, K. T. Telang, and Badruddin Tyabji.

=== Edinburgh and final years ===
In 1868, upon the death of Sir David Brewster, he was appointed Principal of Edinburgh University. From that time till his death, much of his energies were devoted to the well-being of the University. The institution of the new medical school in the University (at Teviot Place) was almost solely due to his initiative; and the Tercentenary Festival, celebrated in 1884, was the result of his enthusiasm. In that year he published The Story of the University of Edinburgh during its First Three Hundred Years.

In 1869 he was elected a Fellow of the Royal Society of Edinburgh, his proposer being Sir Robert Christison. He twice served as Vice President of the Society: 1870 to 1874 and 1876 to 1881.

From 1872 (following the Scottish Education Act of that year) he was a Member of the Board of Education, overseeing a huge programme of school construction across Scotland. He sat on the board until 1878, by which time the construction period was drawing to an end.

From 1875 until his death in 1884 he served as the inaugural vice-president of the newly emerged conservationist body the Cockburn Association.

He died at his Edinburgh address of 21 Lansdowne Crescent in the west end of the city.

He is buried in Dean Cemetery in western Edinburgh.

== Honorary degrees ==
- 1865 – Honorary LLD, Edinburgh University
- 1880 – Honorary DCL, University of Oxford
- 1882 – Honorary Fellow, Oriel College

== Family ==
In 1859 Grant was married to Susan Ferrier, daughter of James Frederick Ferrier. They had eight children. Their two first sons died in infancy. The six remaining children were:

- Sir Ludovic James Grant, 11th Baronet (1862-1936)
- Julia Mary Grant (1864-1952)
- Sylvia Grant (1867-1935)
- Dr Percy Frere Grant (1869-1909)
- Sir Hamilton Grant, 12th Baronet (1872-1937)
- Susan Ferrier Grant (1873-1968)

== Personal life ==
A keen golfer, Grant was a regular at the Elie Golf Club and was caddied by a young Archie Simpson for many years, his favourite.

== Recognition ==
Grant is remembered at the University of Edinburgh to this day with a building named after him: Grant House in Pollock Halls of Residence.

Academic offices
Preceded by David Brewster	Edinburgh University Principals; 1868–1884	Succeeded by Sir William Muir
Baronetage of Nova Scotia
Preceded by Robert Innes Grant	Baronet (of Dalvey); 1856–1884	Succeeded by Ludovic James Grant
