= Ghate Bania =

Hindu caste in Haryana State, India

The Ghate Bania are a Hindu caste, found in the state of Uttar Pradesh in India. A few are also found in Haryana state, India. They are a sub-caste of the Bania community found throughout North India.

== History and origin ==
The name Ghate means loss in the Hindi language. According to their traditions, a member of the community was found with depleted stock and were thus called Ghate. In some regions, It is believed that if any family member marries outside the Caste, they are known as Ghate banias. Their main sub-groups are the, Bisnoi. The community is involved mainly in trade and money lending. They belong to the Vaishnava sect of Hinduism.

They are found mainly in the districts of Saharanpur, Meerut, and Muzaffarnagar districts, and adjoining areas of Haryana. They speak Haryanvi among themselves.

== See also ==
- Sunwani
- Vaishya
