= General McLeod =

General McLeod may refer to:

- Donald Kenneth McLeod (1885–1958), British Indian Army lieutenant general
- John Macleod (British Army officer) (1752–1833), British Army lieutenant general
- John Chetham McLeod (1831–1914), British Army lieutenant general
- Roderick McLeod (British Army officer) (1905–1980), British Army lieutenant general
