= Governor Mackenzie =

Governor Mackenzie may refer to:

- Francis Mackenzie, 1st Baron Seaforth (1754–1815), Governor of Barbados from 1800 to 1806
- John Muir Mackenzie (1854–1916), Acting Governor of Bombay in 1907
