= Pherozeshah Mehta =

Indian Parsi politician and lawyer

Sir Pherozeshah Mehta KCIE
- Mehta in 1909.
- Born: Pherozeshah Merwanjee Mehta; 4 August 1845; Bombay, British India
- Died: 5 November 1915 (aged 70); Bombay, British India
- Citizenship: Indian
- Education: University of Bombay
- Occupations: Lawyer, politician
- Known for: Co-founder and president of Indian National Congress
- Political party: Indian National Congress

Sir Pherozeshah Merwanjee Mehta (4 August 1845 – 5 November 1915) was an Indian politician and lawyer from Bombay. He was knighted by the British Government in India for his service to law. He became the Municipal commissioner of Bombay Municipality in 1873 and its president four times – 1884, 1885, 1905 and 1911. Mehta was one of the founding members and President of the Indian National Congress in 1890 held at Calcutta.

== Early life ==
Pherozeshah Merwanjee Mehta was born on 4 August 1845 in Bombay City, Bombay Presidency, British India into a Gujarati-speaking Parsi Zoroastrian family. His father, a Bombay-based businessman who also spent plenty of time in Calcutta, was not highly educated, but he did translate a Chemistry textbook into Gujarati and wrote a Geography textbook. Graduating from the Elphinstone College in 1864, Pherozeshah obtained his Master of Arts degree with honors six months later, becoming the first such Parsi, from the University of Bombay (later re-established as University of Mumbai). Sir Alexander Grant, principal of the university, nominated him a Fellow of the university and tried to procure him a scholarship founded by Jamsetjee Jejeebhoy to study in Europe. However, Mehta did not avail himself of the scholarship.

Mehta went to England from India to study law at Lincoln's Inn in London. Here, he met and began association with fellow Indian barristers Womesh Chunder Bonnerjee and Badruddin Tyabji. He was one of the active members of the East India Association founded by Dadabhai Naoroji in 1866. In 1868, he became the first Parsi barrister called to the Bar from Lincoln's Inn. The same year, he returned to India, was admitted to the bar, and soon established a practice for himself in a profession then dominated by British lawyers. His associates at the Bombay Bar included Badruddin Tyabji, Hormusji Wadia, Limji Banaji, Bal Mangesh Wagle, and Cursetjee Manockjee Cursetjee. He served as a junior to Thomas Chisholm Anstey.

== Political and social activities ==
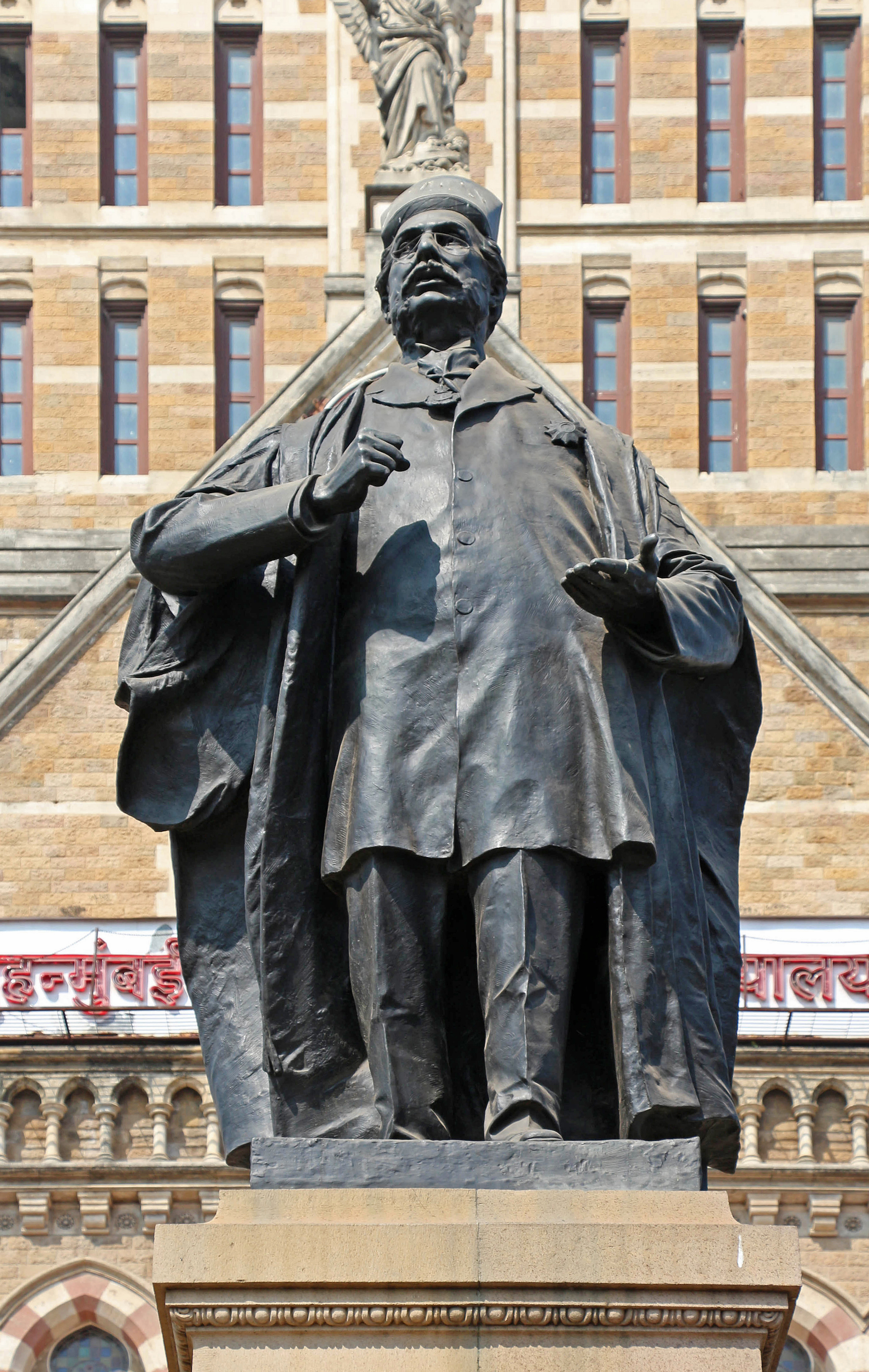
Statue of Sir Pherozeshah Mehta in front of BMC's HQ, next to CST.

In May 1869, Naoroji established a branch of the East India Association under the chairmanship of Sir Jamsetjee Jejeebhoy, 2nd Baronet. Pherozeshah and Bal Mangesh Wagle were appointed the first secretaries of the new association. In his paper he attacked a clause in the East India Bill which sought to empower authorities in India to appoint Indians to any office without being admitted to the Civil Service.

Pherozeshah had joined the Bench of Justices in 1869 after his return from England. It was during a legal defence of Arthur Crawford that he pointed out the need for reforms in the Bombay municipal government. He advocated the introduction of the free representative principle in the constitution of the municipal body. Later, he drafted the Bombay Municipal Act of 1872 and is thus considered the 'father of Bombay Municipality'. Eventually, Mehta left his law practice to enter politics. Mehta served as a member of Bombay's Municipal Corporation for six years. He was elected to two successive terms as president of the Bombay Municipal Corporation in 1884 and 1885, and was again elected unanimously in 1905.

When the Bombay Presidency Association was established in 1885, Mehta along with K. T. Telang and Dinshaw Wacha was appointed as honorary secretary. Sir Jamsetjee Jejeebhoy, second baronet, was appointed the first president and the six vice presidents included Vishvanath Narayan Mandlik, Dadabhai Naoroji, Sorabjee Shapoorji Bengalee, and Naoroji Furdunji. Mehta later was president, and remained so for the rest of his years. He encouraged Indians to obtain western education and embrace its culture to uplift India. He contributed to many social causes for education, sanitation and health care in the city and around India.

Mehta was one of the founders of the Indian National Congress. He was the chairman of the Reception Committee in its fifth session in Bombay in 1889. He presided over the next session in Calcutta.

Mehta was nominated as an additional member of the Bombay Legislative Council in 1887 by the Governor Lord Reay and in 1893 a member of the Imperial Legislative Council. He played an important role in drafting the act of 1888 which significantly amended the Municipal Corporation of Bombay.

In 1894, he was appointed a Companion of the Order of the Indian Empire (CIE) and was appointed a Knight Commander (KCIE) in 1904.

Mehta was the first president of the Central Bank of India when it was founded in 1911. In 1913, he started The Bombay Chronicle, an English-language weekly newspaper, which became an important nationalist voice of its time, and an important chronicler of the political upheavals of a volatile pre-independent India. He invited B. G. Horniman to become its editor who made the paper a voice of the nationalists in India.

In 1915, Mehta was appointed as Vice Chancellor of Bombay University.

Mehta died on 5 November 1915, in Bombay.

== Legacy ==
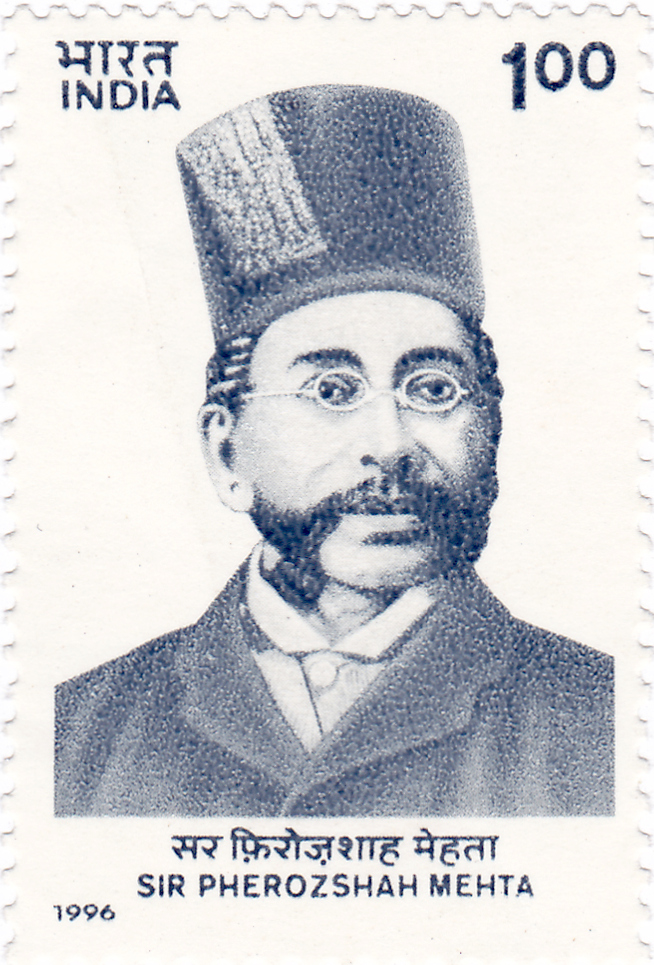
Pherozeshah Mehta featured on Indian Postal Stamp

A portrait of Pherozeshah Mehta at the Indian Parliament House, shows his importance in the making of the nation. He was known as 'The Lion of Bombay' and 'Uncrowned King of Bombay'. In Mumbai, even today Mehta is much revered; there are roads, halls and law colleges named after him. He is respected as an important inspiration for young Indians of the era, his leadership of India's bar and legal profession, and for laying the foundations of Indian involvement in political activities and inspiring Indians to fight for more self-government.

In Mehta's lifetime, few Indians had discussed or embraced the idea of full political independence from Britain. As one of the few people who espoused involvement of the activity of Indians in politics, he was nicknamed "Ferocious Mehta."

== See also ==
- Indian Independence Movement
- Indian National Congress

== Bibliography ==
- Sir Pherozeshah Mehta, a Political Biography – Homi Mody. New York, Asia Pub. House, 1963.
- Sir Pherozeshah Mehta – Hormasji Peroshaw Mody. New Delhi, Publications Division, Ministry of Information and Broadcasting (1967, 1963)
- Life and times of Sir Pherozeshah Mehta – V S Srinivasa Sastri, Bharatiya Vidya Bhavan, 1975.
- Pherozeshah Mehta : Socio-political ideology – S R Bakshi. New Delhi, Anmol Publications, 1991.
- Sir Pherozeshah Mehta memorial volume – Godrej N Dotivala. Bombay : Mayor's Fund Committee, 1990.
- Pherozeshah Mehta : maker of modern India -Nawaz B Mody. Allied Publishers, 1997.
- Sir Pherozeshah Mehta, a sketch of his life and career. (Spanish) Madras, G.A. Natesan 1916.
- Some unpublished & later speeches & writings of Sir Pherozeshah Mehta – POO. Jeejeebhoy. Commercial Press, 1918.
- Ten Indian Biographies, in Hindi – Surendra Sharma; Avadha Upadhyaya; Lakshminidhi Chaturvedi; P S Verma; P N Ojha; Janakosharan Verma; Ganesha Datta Gaur. Prayaga, Hindi Press, 1930.
