= 1871 Birthday Honours =

National awards given by Queen Victoria

The 1871 Birthday Honours were appointments by Queen Victoria to various orders and honours to reward and highlight good works by citizens of the British Empire. The appointments were made to celebrate the official birthday of the Queen, and were published in The London Gazette on 20 May 1871.

The recipients of honours are displayed here as they were styled before their new honour, and arranged by honour, with classes (Knight, Knight Grand Cross, etc.) and then divisions (Military, Civil, etc.) as appropriate.

== United Kingdom and British Empire ==
=== The Most Honourable Order of the Bath ===
==== Knight Grand Cross of the Order of the Bath (GCB) ====
===== Military Division =====
Royal Navy

- Admiral the Honourable Sir Henry Keppel KCB
- Admiral Sir Alexander Milne KCB
- Admiral Sir Sydney Colpoys Dacres KCB
- General Sir Robert Vivian KCB

Army

- General Sir William Fenwick Williams Bt KCB
- Lieutenant-General Sir John Michel KCB
- Lieutenant-General Lord William Paulet KCB

==== Knight Commander of the Order of the Bath (KCB) ====
===== Military Division =====
Royal Navy

- Rear-Admiral William Robert Mends CB
- Rear-Admiral William King-Hall CB

Army

- Lieutenant-General James Alexander CB
- Lieutenant-General Edward Walter Forestier-Walker CB
- Lieutenant-General John Fowler Bradford CB
- Major-General David Russell CB
- Major-General Henry William Stisted CB
- Major-General Charles Richard, Earl De La Warr CB
- Major-General Frederick Paul Haines
- Major-General Thomas Montagu Steele CB
- Major-General Collingwood Dickson VC CB
- Major-General Charles Reid CB
- Major-General James William Fitzmayer CB
- Major-General Henry Charles Barnston Daubeney CB
- David Dumbreck CB Inspector-General of Hospitals
- Controller William Henry Drake CB

==== Companion of the Order of the Bath (CB) ====
===== Military Division =====
Royal Navy

- Vice-Admiral Edward Gennys Fanshawe
- Rear-Admiral John Bourmaster Dickson
- Captain the Honourable George Disney Keane
- Captain Alan Henry Gardner
- Captain William Rae Rolland
- Captain Edward Winterton Turnour
- Captain Arthur William Acland Hood
- Captain Charles Fellowes
- Captain Charles Codrington Forsyth

Army

- Colonel Edward Herbert Maxwell, 88th Regiment
- Colonel Edward Kaye, Royal (late Bengal) Artillery
- Colonel William Gordon
- Colonel George Harry Smith Willis
- Colonel Charles Vyvyan Cox, Royal (late Bengal) Artillery
- Colonel George Wentworth Alexander Higginson, Grenadier Guards
- Colonel William Boyle, 89th Regiment
- Colonel Robert William Lowry, 47th Regiment
- Colonel John Blick Spurgin CSI 102nd Regiment
- Colonel Robert John Eagar, 31st Regiment
- Colonel the Honourable Hussey Fane Keane, Royal Engineers
- Colonel Alexander Caesar Hawkins, Royal Artillery
- Colonel Richard Parke, Royal Marines
- Colonel Fairfax Charles Hassard, Royal Engineers
- Colonel George Shaw, Royal Artillery
- Colonel John Chetham McLeod, 42nd Regiment
- Colonel Sir Seymour John Blane Bt late Rifle Brigade
- Colonel James Clerk Rattray, 90th Regiment
- Colonel Thomas Wright, Bengal Staff Corps
- Colonel Charles George Arbuthnot, Royal Artillery
- Lieutenant-Colonel Howard Craufurd Elphinstone CB (Civil)CMG VC Royal Engineers
- Lieutenant-Colonel Charles Henry Palliser, Bengal Staff Corps
- Lieutenant-Colonel Walter Fane, Madras Staff Corps
- Inspector-General of Hospitals Joshua Paynter
- Deputy Inspector-General of Hospitals Richard James O'Flaherty
- Surgeon-Major John Ashton Bostock Scots Fusilier Guards

===== Civil Division =====
- Controller William Henry Maturin
- Colonel William Manley Hall Dixon, of the Royal Artillery, Superintendent of the Royal Small Arms Factory
- Deputy Controller Ben Hay Martindale
- Assistant Controller Joseph Osbertus Hamley

=== The Most Exalted Order of the Star of India ===
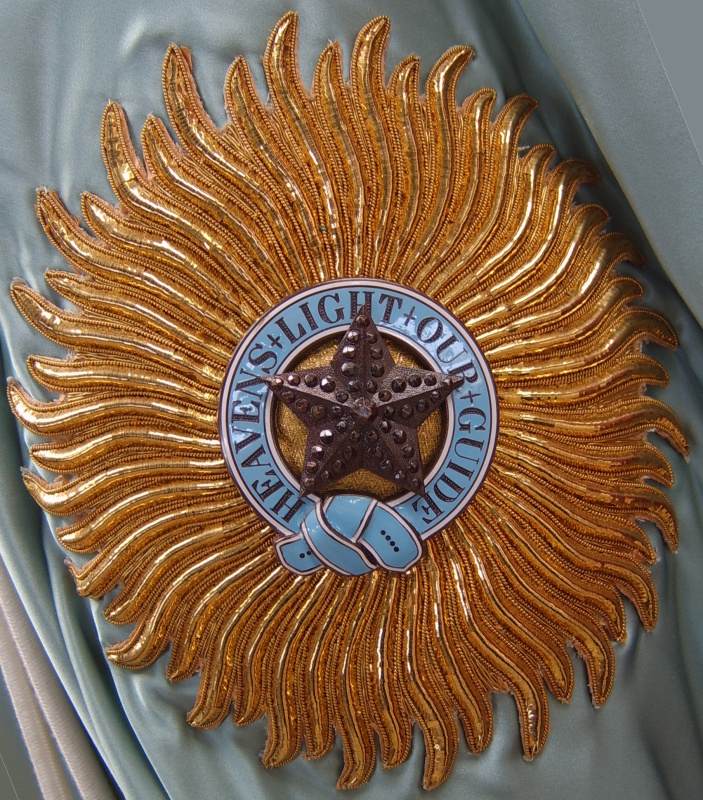
Star of a Knight Grand Commander of the Most Exalted Order of the Star of India

==== Knight Grand Commander (GCSI) ====
- His Highness Dheraj Sumbho Sing, Maharana of Oodeypore
- His Highness The Rao Pragmuljee of Cutch

==== Knight Commander (KCSI) ====
- The Nawab Mohsin-ood-Dowlah Bahadoor of Oude
- His Highness Mohubut Khan, Nawab of Joonaghur
- Major-General George Inglis Jameson, Bombay Army, late President of the Military Finance Commission for India, Auditor of the Accounts of the Department of the Secretary of State for India in Council
- John William Kaye, formerly of the Bengal Artillery, now Secretary in the Political and Secret Department of the Office of the Secretary of State for India in Council
- Henry Sumner Maine, late Member of the Council of the Governor-General of India

==== Companion (CSI) ====
- Khajah Abdool Gunny, of Dacca, late Member of the Council of the Lieutenant-Governor of Bengal for making Laws and Regulations
- Vembankum Ramiergar, Member of the Council of the Governor of Madras for making Laws and Regulations
- Istakant Shungoony Menon, Dewan of His Highness the Rajah of Cochin
- Mir Shaharaut Ali, Superintendent of the State of Rutlam in Central India
- Mahomed Akram Khan, Nawab of Amb
- Sir Jamsetjee Jejeebhoy Bt late Member of the Council of the Governor of Bombay for making Laws and Regulations
- Munguldass Nuthoobhoy, Member of the Council of the Governor of Bombay for making Laws and Regulations
- Lionel Robert Ashburner, Bombay Civil Service, Collector and Magistrate of Kandeish
- Major-General Alexander Cunningham, late Bengal Army, Director-General of the Archaeological Survey of India
