= Sitaram Keshav Bole =

Indian politician

Rao Bahadur Sitaram Keshav Bole
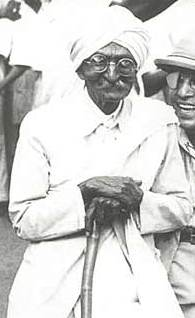
- Rao Bahadur Sitaram Keshav Bole on November 18, 1951
- Born: 1869; Palshet, Maharashtra
- Died: January 14, 1961 (aged 91–92)
- Other names: Balasaheb Bole, S.K. Bole, Rao Bahadur S.K. Bole
- Citizenship: India
- Education: SSC passed
- Occupations: Social reformer, activist, politician
- Title: Member of the Bombay Legislative Council
- Political party: Hindu Mahasabha
- Other political affiliations: Non-Brahmin Party; Independent Labour Party
- Awards: Rao Bahadur

Rao Bahadur Sitaram Keshav Bole, also known as Babasaheb Bole (1869―1961) was an Indian reformer, activist, barrister and politician from Bombay. He was a member of the Bombay Legislative Council, who was known for his contributions towards the upliftment of mill workers in Bombay and the Bhandari community. He was an associate of B. R. Ambedkar. He founded the Kitte Bhandari Aikyavardhak Mandali, founded in 1890. Rao Bahadur SK Bole Road in Dadar, Mumbai, is named after him. The British government conferred him the title of Rao Bahadur.

== Biography ==
=== Early life ===
He was born in 1869 in Palshet, Maharashtra. 1889 He passed his SSC exam in 1889. He followed Satyashodhak ideology. He established Kitte Bhandari Aikyavardhak Mandali on January 14, 1890.

=== Works ===
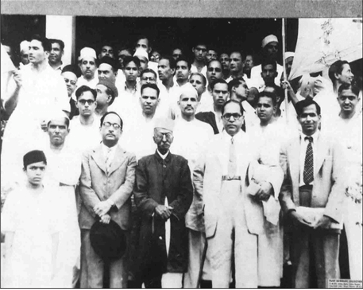
Raobahadur Sitaram Keshav Bole and other social workers meet Dr Babasaheb Ambedkar at the Bombay Airport. The group requested Dr Ambedkar to adopt the saffron colour flag as the National Flag – Bombay, July 10, 1947

He highlighted the poor working conditions of mill workers and played a vital role in empowering the oppressed classes along with Dr. Babasaheb Bhimrao Ambedkar. Bole played a vital role in introducing several important Bills in the Bombay legislature, which dealt with maternity benefits for women mill workers and increasing the Marriageable age of women to 16 from age of 12.

Sitaram Keshav Bole fought election from Non-Brahmin Party for the Bombay Legislative Council election in 1920. He was the first to initiate the anti-khoti struggle in 1922, which B.R. Ambedkar later led. Bole tabled the Anti-Khoti Bill in the Bombay Legislative Council, which received support from Ambedkar while Bal Gangadhar Tilak opposed the bill.

In 1923, he proposed a resolution in the Bombay Legislative Council that sought to allow the untouchable classes (Dalits) to use public watering places, wells, and Dharamshala built and maintained out of public funds or administered by bodies appointed by the government. The Bombay government adopted the resolution and it was confirmed by numerous local bodies, including the Mahad City Council. It was named Bole Resolution after him. S. K. Bole joined the Independent Labour Party, a newly formed political party of B. R. Ambedkar. In the 1937 elections, he contested from the Ratnagiri region but lost to the Congress party candidate. In 1938, he took a drastic shift and joined the Hindu Mahasabha.

He was appointed as the chairmanship of Maharashtra Prantik Hindu Mahasabha in 1938 and served as chairman till 1945.

=== Other ===
Bole established the Indian Education Society in 1917 and held the position of chief of the Indian Education Society and Dadar Co-operative Institute. In 1925, he started a weekly newspaper, Navyug. He was served as the chairman of the Co-operative Conference, Vasai, in 1926 and was made chairman of Co-operative Conference, Kalyan in 1927.

== Death and legacy ==
He died on January 14, 1961. A road in Mumbai's Dadar west called Raobahadur SK Bole Road is named after him by the Bombay Municipal Corporation.
