= Sunwani =

The Sunwani are a Hindu Bania found in the state of Uttar Pradesh in India. They use the surname Gupta, and are sometimes referred to as Gupta.

== Origin ==
The Sunwani are a Bania sub-caste, and are a community associated with trade. They are found mainly in the districts of Farukhabad, Hardoi. Lakhimpur Kheri, Pilibhit, Shahjahanpur, and Sitapur. The Sunwani speak Awadhi, although most Sunwani can speak Hindi. They are an endogamous community, although there are instances of marriage with the Bania community.

The Sunwani have remained associated with trade. A few Sunwani are a land holders, but rarely cultivate the land. Like other Bania groups, they have seen a marked urbanization.

== See also ==
- Ghate Bania
