= Vishnu Shastri Pandit =

Marathi social reformer (1827 – 1876)

Vishnu Shastri Parashuram Pandit
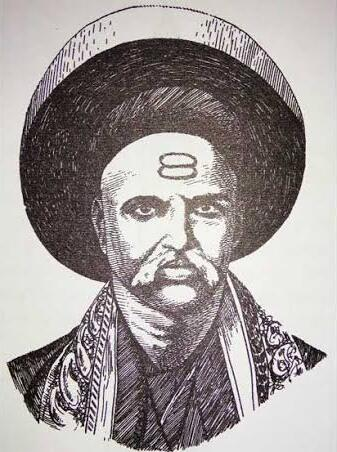
- Born: 1827; Satara district
- Died: 1876 (aged 48–49)
- Occupations: Author, journalist, and social reformer
- Writing career
- Language: Marathi
- Notable work: Induprakash periodical

Vishnu Shastri Parashuram Pandit (1827 – 1876) was a Marathi writer, journalist, and social reformer from Satara district. Known for his progressive stances and oratory skills, he dedicated much of his life to advocacy for women's rights and economic reforms. Due to his extensive efforts towards the cause of widow remarriage, he is referred to as the "Vidyasagar of Maharashtra".

== Early life and education ==
Vishnushastri Parashuram Pandit was born in 1827 in Satara. He completed his initial studies in Sanskrit, Nyaya (logic), and grammar under the guidance of Raghavendracharya Gajendragadkar, a scholar from Satara, and his son Narayanacharya. In 1845, Pandit moved to Poona to pursue an English education.

== Career and journalism ==
In 1848, Pandit he began working at the government's education department. During his tenure there, he served in various capacities, working as a teacher, a translator, and a translation examiner.

After several years of service, he resigned in 1864 to pursue social journalism. He subsequently relocated to Bombay to become the editor of Induprakash, a newspaper dedicated to social reform.

== Social reforms ==
Pandit used his platform as an editor and public speaker to openly challenge prevailing social evils, including child marriage, the forced tonsure of widows (keshavapan), and the practice of marrying young girls to elderly men (jarathkumari vivah). For this, he deeply studied ancient religious texts. He publicly argued that since Hinduism was founded on the writings of ancient sages, it could not inherently contain such unjust and inhuman restrictions against women.

Pandit demonstrated his conviction to reform by marrying a widow himself. Recognizing that there was no organized support structure for individuals who favoured these reforms, he established the Vidhavavivaha Mandala (Widow Remarriage Association) in Bombay on 14 December 1865.

Beyond his writing, Pandit was an orator who widely promoted widow remarriage through public lectures. In 1870, he participated in a major debate on the validity of widow remarriage held in Poona under the chairmanship of the Shankaracharya, where he presented good arguments. His lectures on the subject were compiled and published in a book later that year.

While he mainly worked for women's rights and widow remarriage, Pandit championed several other causes:

- Caste discrimination: He made active efforts toward the eradication of caste-based divisions in society.
- Social welfare: He wrote articles and delivered lectures addressing the benefits of education, the importance of industries, and the destructive social impacts of addictions like gambling and alcohol consumption.
- Economic awareness: He drew public attention to macroeconomic challenges, critiquing the heavy influx of foreign imports, the subsequent decline of indigenous trades, and the deteriorating financial condition of local artisans.

== Literary works ==
Pandit was a writer, translator, and editor. In 1865, he translated a book written by the Bengali social reformer Ishwar Chandra Vidyasagar advocating for widow remarriage into the Marathi language.

His other major publications and compilations include:

- Nana Fadnavis hachi Sankshipta Bakhar (1859) – A concise historical chronicle compiled using MacDonald's Chronicle of Nana Fadnavis and various other reference texts.
- Hindustanacha Itihas (1861) – A historical work based on chapters 10 through 14 of Murray's History of British India.
- English-Marathi Kosh (1864) – A comprehensive English-to-Marathi dictionary.
- Sanskrit ani Maharashtra Dhatukosh (1865) – A specialized roots dictionary.
- Tukarama's Abhanga Gatha (1869, 1873) – A two-volume edited compilation of the devotional poetry (Abhanga) of the saint-poet Tukaram, completed with the assistance of Shankar Pandurang Pandit.
