= Charles Ollivant =

Indian politician (1846–1915)

Sir Edward Charles Kayll Ollivant KCIE (7 February 1846 – 24 December 1928) was a senior member of the Indian Civil Service. He had notable interactions with both Mahatma Gandhi and Muhammed Ali Jinnah.

Ollivant arrived in India in 1881. In 1892, he had a disagreement in Rajkot with Gandhi, who was then a young barrister. The incident resulted in Gandhi being pushed out of a room, and ill feelings about this dispute were apparently a factor in Gandhi's departure for South Africa in 1893.

Ollivant also offered to hire Muhammed Ali Jinnah at 1,500 rupees per month, and was notably turned down.

Ollivant was a judicial member of the Council of the Governor of Bombay until April 1902, and a director of the Bombay, Baroda and Central India Railway. He was knighted as a Knight Commander of the Order of the Indian Empire (KCIE) in 1892.

== See also ==
- Henry Northcote, 1st Baron Northcote, Governor of Bombay (1900–1903)
