= Modh =

Group of distinct communities

Modh is an adjective often adopted in the surnames of Gujarati people who originate from Modhera in Gujarat.

== History ==
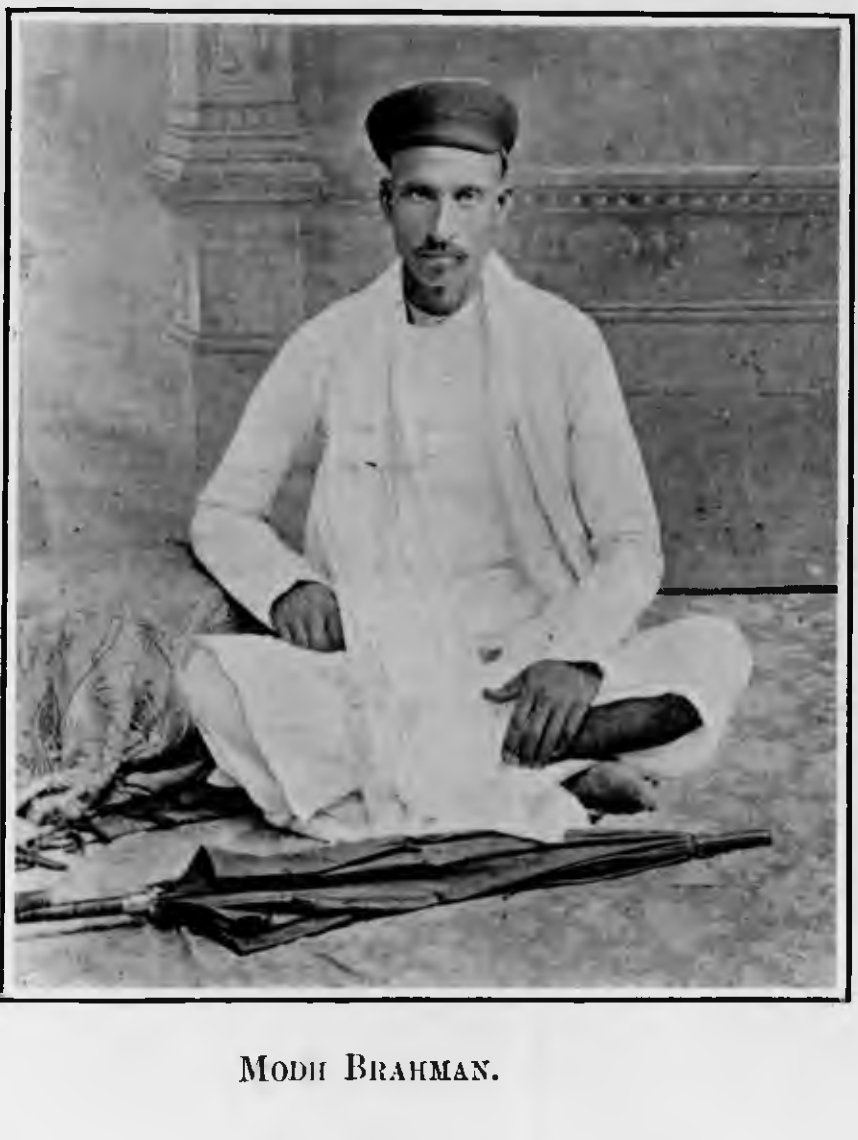
1911 photograph of a Modh Brahmin

There are both Modh Brahmins and Modh Banias. The Modh Banias, like other Hindu Vanias, are divided into Visa ("20") and Dasa ("10"), of which the Visa is considered to be of the higher status.

The Dharmāraṇya Purāṇa is the caste purāṇa of the Moḍh Brāhmaṇs and Moḍh Vāṇiyās, and was composed by the former. The purāṇa states that the Moḍh Brāhmaṇs were created by the gods to transform Dharmāraṇya into a holy tīrtha. Moḍh Vaṇiks (who are grouped with Vaishyas) were created by the divine cow Kāmadhenu by kicking up dirt in order to serve the Moḍh Brāhmaṇs with charity. The purāṇa was composed between the 14th and 15th centuries CE.

Formerly Moḍh Bāṇiyā were either Vaishnav or Jain, but in modern times all Moḍhs are Vaishnav.

Modh Ghanchis or Telis were classified as an Other Backward Class by the state of Gujarat in 1994, and by the Union of India in 1999.

The list of gotras for Modh Brahmins are Bharadwaja, Dharnas, Gangayana, Gangeyas, Gangyanas, Gautama, Kashyapa, Kaushika, Krishnatri, Kushika, Laugaksha, Mandavya, Paingya, Shaunaka, Upamanyu, and Vatsas.

== People ==
- Mahatma Gandhi, icon of the Indian independence movement, belonged to Modh-Bania caste.
- Hemachandra, the Indian Jain scholar, poet, mathematician and polymath was a Modh Vaniya.
- Narendra Modi, 14th and the current Prime Minister of India, belongs to Modh-Ghanchi caste.
- The Ambani family, one of the richest families, belong to Modh-Bania caste.
