= William Drysdale =

Scottish cricketer and British Army officer (1876–1916)

William Drysdale DSO
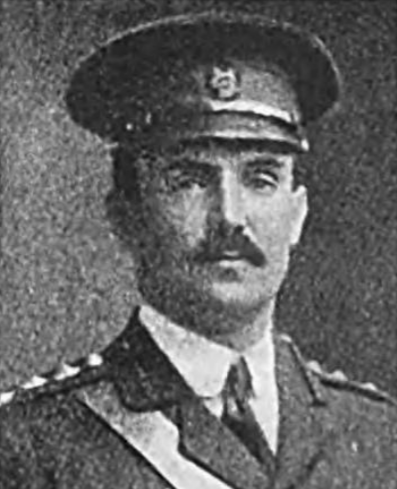

Personal information
- Full name: William Drysdale
- Born: 4 November 1876; Kirkcaldy, Fife, Scotland
- Died: 29 September 1916 (aged 39); Gueudecourt, Somme, France
- Batting: Right-handed

Domestic team information
- Years: Team
- 1900/01–1902/03: Europeans

Career statistics
| Competition | First-class |
|---|---|
| Matches | 4 |
| Runs scored | 92 |
| Batting average | 11.50 |
| 100s/50s | –/1 |
| Top score | 55 |
| Catches/stumpings | 1/– |
- Source: Cricinfo, 6 October 2020

William Drysdale DSO (4 November 1876 – 29 September 1916) was a Scottish first-class cricketer and British Army officer.

The son of William Drysdale senior, he was born at Kirkcaldy in November 1876. He was educated at Loretto School, where he played rugby union. After leaving Loretto, he decided on a career in the British Army and attended the Royal Military College, Sandhurst. He graduated as a second lieutenant into the Royal Scots in September 1896. Shortly after graduating he served in British India and British Burma, with promotion to lieutenant coming in August 1898. While in British India, he played first-class cricket for the Europeans cricket team on four occasions all against the Parsees cricket team in the Bombay Presidency between 1900 and 1902. He scored 92 runs in his four matches, with a high score of 55. He was awarded a medal for attempting to save the life of comrade from drowning in 1902. He was promoted to captain in November 1902. He married Mary Louisa Mackenzie, the daughter of Sir John Muir Mackenzie, in January 1904. Drysdale later attended the Staff College in 1908 and 1909, captaining their cricket team.

Drysdale served in the First World War, where he was wounded in action and earned the Distinguished Service Cross during the First Battle of Ypres for showing “an unsurpassed example of fearlessness and courage, refusing to quit his brigade when wounded”. In February 1915 he was promoted to major. He was given command of the 7th Battalion of the Leicestershire Regiment in October 1915. He was made a brevet lieutenant colonel in June 1916, while the following month he was again wounded in action during the Battle of Bazentin Ridge when storming the village of Bazentinle-Petit. After recovering from his wounds, he returned to his battalion September, but was killed on the 29th of the same month by a German sniper when looking over a trench near Gueudecourt. He is buried at the Caterpillar Valley Cemetery.
