= Vurjeevandas Madhowdas =

Indian merchant and philanthropist

- Born: 28 January 1817; Gogla, Kathiawar, India
- Died: 12 January 1896 (aged 78); Bombay, India
- Occupation(s): Merchant, philanthropist, justice of the peace
- Employer(s): Vurjeevandas & Sons (owner); Bombay Port Trust
- Organization(s): Royal Asiatic Society; Bombay University; Medical Women for India Fund

Vurjeevandas Madhowdas (28 January 1817 in Gogla, Kathiawar, India – 12 January 1896 in Bombay) was a Hindu merchant in Bombay (now Mumbai), of the Kapole Bania caste. His father came to Bombay with Sheth Manoredas for trading purposes.

== Biography ==
Vurjeevandas was educated in Bombay, started a new firm under the name of Vurjeevandas & Sons, and soon became one of the wealthiest merchants in Bombay. He was appointed a justice of the peace and a member of the Bombay Port Trust. He took a keen interest in the Royal Asiatic Society and the Bombay University, where a prize has been established to commemorate his name. He constructed the Madhow Bang in memory of his father, and gave it for the use of poor Hindus, endowing it with nearly 500,000 rupees. He built a rest-house in Bombay in memory of his brother Mooljibhoy, and another one at Nasik. The sanatorium which he built in memory of his youngest son Rumhoredas at Sion Hill still stands today. He also established a dispensary at Matoonga and a fund for the relief of poor Hindus. In addition, he was on the Managing Committee of the Medical Women for India Fund around 1889.

He died on 12 January 1896, aged 78.
