= Kapol community =

Kapol community (also known as Kapol Samaj or Kapole or Kapol Vania) is a subgroup of the larger Vaishya/Bania merchant community, connected with the Saurashtra (Kathiawar) peninsula of Gujarat, India. Notable members include merchant Vurjeevandas Madhowdas (1817–1896).

== See also ==
- Kapol Co-operative Bank Ltd.
