= Naoroji Furdunji =

Naoroji Furdunji (1817–1885) was a Parsi reformer from Bombay.

He was born at Bharuch and educated at Bombay, becoming a teacher.

During the 1840s, he defended the Zoroastrianism of the Parsis, at that time under pressure from Christian missionary activity, in Fam-i-Farshid which he edited. He was a founder of the Student's Literary and Scientific Society on 6 June 1848, with Dadabhai Naoroji, Bhau Daji Lad, Jagannath Shankar Shet, Vishwanath Mandlik and Sorabji Shapurji Bengali. In 1851, with backing from K. N. Kama and in company with other like-minded Parsis, he founded the Rahnumai Mazdayasnan Sabha, becoming its president for the rest of his life. As secretary of the Parsi Law Association from 1855 to 1864 he worked for legal codification.

When the Bombay Association was set up in 1852, Naoroji Furdunji took the major part in drafting its petition, made in 1853, to the British Parliament. He was one of the Association's secretaries, with Bhau Daji, whose investigative activities directed at British governance caused alarm, and a withdrawal of support by the Association's leadership at the time of the petition.

Naoroji Furdunji visited Europe three times, being sent in 1873 by the Sabha and the Bombay Association to London, to give evidence to a parliamentary committee on Indian finance. He worked with the British authorities as an interpreter, for a period from 1836 with Alexander Burnes, and for the Bombay court from 1845 to 1864.
