= Gopal Hari Deshmukh =

Indian social reformer (1823–1892)

Rao Bahadur, Lokhitwadi Gopal Hari Deshmukh
- Born: 18 February 1823; Pune, Bombay Presidency, British India
- Died: 9 October 1892 (aged 69); Pune, Bombay Presidency, British India
- Other names: Lokhitwadi

Philosophical work
- Era: 19th century philosophy
- Main interests: Ethics, religion, humanism

Rao Bahadur Gopal Hari Deshmukh also known as Lokhitwadi (18 February 1823 – 9 October 1892) was an Indian activist, thinker, social reformer and writer from Maharashtra. Deshmukh is regarded as an important figure of the Social Reform Movement in Maharashtra.

== Early life ==
Gopal Hari Deshmukh was born into a Maharashtrian Chitpavan Brahmin family in 1823. He was a descendant of Vishwanathpant Sidhaye, a native of Konkan and a Deshmukh who held a vatan (right to collect revenue/fief) of many villages. The family settled in Pune and were from then on known by the surname,'Deshmukh' . His father was the treasurer of Bapu Gokhale, the general of Bajirao II during the First Anglo-Afghan War. Deshmukh studied at the Poona English Medium School.

== Career ==
Deshmukh started his career as a translator for the government then under British Raj. In 1867, the government appointed him a small cause judge in Ahmedabad, Gujarat. He also worked as a Diwan for the princely state of Ratlam. He held many other important positions, including those of the Assistant Inam Commissioner, Joint Judge of Nasik High Court, and Member of the Law Council. He retired as a sessions judge. Deshmukh received many honors for his service from the colonial government including 'Justice of Peace' and 'Raobahadur'.

== Social activism ==
=== Social work in Maharashtra ===
At age 25, Deshmukh started writing articles aimed at social reform in Maharashtra in the weekly Prabhakar (प्रभाकर) under the pen name Lokhitawadi (लोकहितवादी). In the first two years, he penned 108 articles on social reform. That group of articles has come to be known in Marathi literature as Lokhitawadinchi Shatapatre (लोकहितवादींची शतपत्रे).

He promoted emancipation (liberation) and education of women, and wrote against arranged child marriages, dowry system, and polygamy, all of which were prevalent in India in his times.

He wrote against the evils of the caste system which was strongly prevalent in India in his times, condemned harmful Hindu religious orthodoxy, and attacked the monopoly in religious matters and rituals which Brahmin priests had through a long tradition (Deshmukh, himself, belonged to the Brahmin caste). He enunciated certain 15 principles for bringing about religious reform in Hindu society.

Deshmukh co-founded a public library named as "Pune Nagar Vachan Mandir" in Pune under the leadership of the then British officials of Bombay Presidency, Sir George Russel Clerke in 1948. He also donated some books to University of Bombay (1875) Library. His personal collection is added to University of Mumbai at J.N.Library knows as "Deshmukh collection". His life-size portrait (with some amount to add some new books from its interest every year) is donated to Univ. of Mumbai Library He took a leadership role in founding Gyan Prakash (ज्ञानप्रकाश), Indu Prakash (इंदुप्रकाश), and Lokhitwadi (लोकहितवादी) periodicals in Maharashtra.

Lokahitwadi Gopal Hari Deshmukh Trust is now carrying forward his legacy by promoting and assisting social causes such as education of poor children by means of Scholarships, cleanlinesses drives, working with PMC and Police authorities to make roads safer and other social causes.

=== Social work in Gujarat ===
While Deshmukh was serving as a judge in Ahmedabad, he organized in that city annual speech conferences on social issues under the sponsorship of Premabhai Institute, and also himself delivered speeches. He established in Ahmedabad a branch of prarthana samaj, founded an institute promoting remarriages of widows, and invigorated Gujarat Vernacular Society. He started a weekly Hitesha ('हितेच्छु) in both Gujarati and English. He also started " Gujarati Budhhi-Wardhak Sabha".

== Books ==
Deshmukh wrote 35 books on diverse topics, including religious, social, economic, political, historic, and literary matters. He wrote Panipat war, Kalyog, Jatibhed, Lankecha Itihas. He also translated some English works into Marathi. Many books are written on him & his work by famous writers.

His writing includes topics like Panipat, History of Gujarat and History of Lanka.
