= Kapol Co-operative Bank =

Bank in Mumbai, India

Kapol Co-operative Bank Limited
- Company type: Cooperative bank
- Industry: Banking, Financial services
- Founded: 1939
- Defunct: 2023
- Fate: Licence cancelled, under liquidation
- Headquarters: Mumbai, Maharashtra, India
- Area served: Maharashtra, Gujarat
- Products: Deposits, loans, banking services
- Website: www.kapolbank.com (archived)

The Kapol Co-operative Bank Limited was an Indian multi-state scheduled urban co-operative bank based in Mumbai, Maharashtra. It was established in 1939 and primarily served the Kapol community and operated branches in Maharashtra and Gujarat.

In 2023, the bank faced significant financial irregularities and fraud allegations, leading to stringent regulatory actions by the Reserve Bank of India (RBI). In 2023, the RBI cancelled its banking licence due to inadequate capital and poor earning prospects, and the bank was placed under liquidation.

== History ==
According to the company, it was founded in 1939 as a credit society for the Kapol community, and later evolved into a scheduled urban co-operative bank. It expanded its footprint in Maharashtra and Gujarat but began facing financial and governance challenges by the early 2000s.

In 2003, a bank director was granted bail in an extortion case. In 2013, director Hiren Mehta was arrested for aiding three businessmen in siphoning off ₹14.5 crore through forged letters of credit. In 2019, former bank officer Jayanta Dimbeshwar Das was arrested for his role in a ₹15 crore letters of credit scam.

In March 2017, the RBI imposed restrictions under Section 35A of the Banking Regulation Act, 1949, limiting withdrawals to ₹3,000 per account and prohibiting new loans or deposits without prior approval. These curbs were extended multiple times, including through April 2021 and October 2022.

In June 2021, Kapol Bank consented to a potential merger with Cosmos Co-operative Bank, who has previously acquired five banks. In January 2025, the Reserve Bank of India approved the merger.

On 25 September 2023, the RBI cancelled the bank's licence, citing non-compliance with capital and operational requirements under the Banking Regulation Act, 1949, and its inability to pay depositors in full.

On 8 November 2023, the Central Registrar of Cooperative Societies (CRCS) ordered the bank's liquidation and appointed Shardul S. Jadhav as liquidator. By July 2023, the Deposit Insurance and Credit Guarantee Corporation (DICGC) had disbursed ₹230.16 crore to 96.09% of depositors, covering insured deposits up to ₹5 lakh. In April 2024, the RBI excluded the bank from the Second Schedule of the RBI Act, 1934. The liquidator's term was extended to November 2025 to address ongoing recovery and legal proceedings.

== See also ==
- List of banks in India
