= Parsi law =

Parsi Zoroastrian legal code in India

The Parsi law is the law governing the Parsi Zoroastrian community of India. Parsi law is largely derived from nineteenth century's legal tradition. In particular, the main legislative texts of the Parsi law are:

- Parsi Marriage and Divorce Act, 1865.
- Parsi Marriage and Divorce Act, 1936.
- Parsi Marriage and Divorce (Amendment) Act, 1940.
- Parsi Marriage and Divorce (Amendment) Act, 1988.

== See also ==
- Zoroastrianism in India

== Further bibliography ==
- P. K. Irani, The personal law of the Parsis of India, in J.N.D. Anderson (ed.), Family Law in Asia and Africa, London, George Allen & Unwin Ltd, 1968, pp. 273–300
- M. Sharafi, Law and Identity in Colonial South Asia: Parsi Legal Culture, 1772–1947, Cambridge University Press, New York, 2014
- F. A. Ráná, Parsi Law: Containing the Law Applicable to Parsis as Regards Succession and Inheritance, Marriage and Divorce, Printed at the Examiner Press, 1902
- M. Miele, English Common Law, Extraterritoriality and Parsi Law: A Case in 1930s’ China, Prague Papers on the History of International Relations, 2/2019, pp. 19–29
