= Framjee Nasarwanjee Patel =

Indian Parsee businessman and jurist (1804–1894)

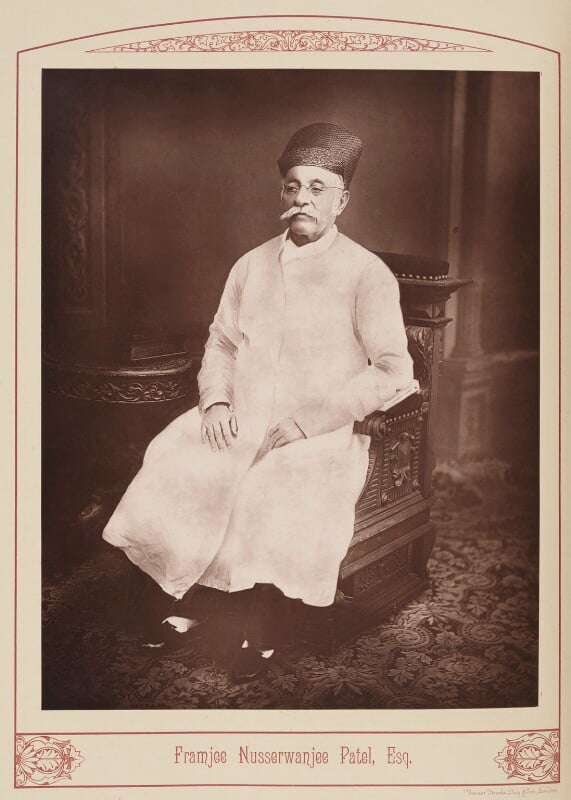
Patel c. 1889

Framjee Nasarwanjee Patel (1804–1894), middle name also spelt Nusserwanjee, was a Parsee reformer, merchant and philanthropist.

== Life ==
He had a sound vernacular education, with a smattering of English received in Bombay. At the age of fifteen he entered upon a business career, and its pursuit proved so congenial that by 1827 he had worked his way to a partnership in the firm of Frith, Bomanjee & Co. Banking facilities being then exceedingly scanty, such Parsees as had any capital at command acted as bankers and brokers to the rising English firms.

Patel's experience enabled him in a few years to raise the status of his compatriots to the higher level of independent merchants, and he founded in 1844 a business house under the name of Wallace & Co., in which he was himself a partner with the English members of the firm. When he retired in 1858 he had amassed a large competence, and in the following year he established a firm on the same lines under the style of Framjee, Sands & Co., of which the members were some of his sons, together with English partners.

It was, however, not so much for his success as a merchant, as for his spirit and liberality as an educationist, reformer and philanthropist, that his name is notable in the annals of western India. He entered on his civic labors in 1837, and in all public movements figured prominently as an accredited representative of his community. As a pioneer of education, both for boys and girls, his example inspired the younger men of his time, like Dadabhai Naoroji, at one time Member of Parliament (MP) for Finsbury Central, and Naoroji Fardoonjee and Sorabjee Shapurjee Bengallee.

When Mountstuart Elphinstone, during his governorship, conceived the idea of concentrating the literary and educational activity which had arisen from isolated efforts on the part of men who had themselves been brought into contact with Western culture, among his chief collaborators were Framjee Cowasjee Banajee and Framjee Patel. To their initiative was due the establishment of the Elphinstone Institution, which comprised a high school and, after some years, a college, which continue to hold the foremost rank among the similar academies since established in western India. But Mr Patel's most remarkable public service was performed in connection with the Parsee Law Association, of which he was president. Since their exodus from Persia, the domestic affairs of the Parsees had been in a very unsettled state.

Matrimonial obligations and the rights of succession in cases of intestacy had fallen into hopeless confusion, and the adjudication of disputes in relation thereto was effected by certain elders of the community, who had neither the knowledge and help of fixed principles to guide their judgments, nor any authority to enforce their decisions. The case of Ardesir Cursetjee v. Peeroxebai, which came up on appeal before the privy council in England, brought to light the strange fact that even the supreme court of Bombay had no jurisdiction over matrimonial and ecclesiastical disputes among Parsees. This state of lawlessness was recognized by that community as intolerable, and the agitation which ensued thereupon led to the appointment of a commission, of which the distinguished jurist, Sir Joseph Arnould, was the president and Framjee Patel the chief Parsee member.

The Parsee Law Association, under the guidance of Patel and Sorabjee Bengallee, rendered invaluable help to the commission, and their joint efforts resulted in the passing by the government of India of the Parsee Marriage and Divorce Act and the Parsee Intestate Succession Act (15 and 21 of 1865). These acts form the charter of matrimonial and ecclesiastical status for the Parsees.

At the time of his death in 1894, aged 89, Framjee Patel was the most revered and best beloved of the distinguished natives of India, having during an eventful public life extending over sixty years worked in co-operation with three generations of the most prominent of his compatriots to better the condition of their country. His family surname refers to the title of Patel, that is, "mayor," of Bombay, conferred on its founder for services rendered to the English in 1692.
