= Dosabhai Framji Karaka =

Indian journalist and politician (1829–1902)

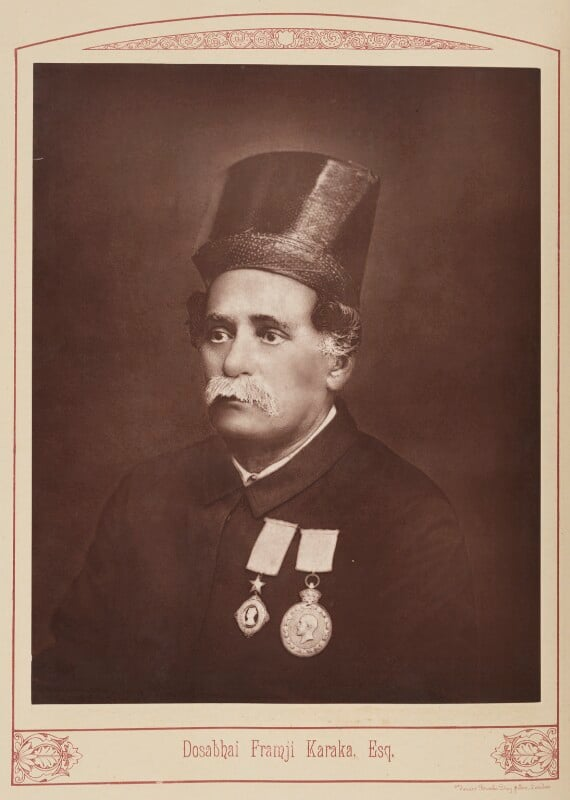
Karaka c. 1889

Dosabhai Framji Karaka (1829–1902) was an Indian newspaper editor and official, known for his history of the Parsis.

He was educated at the Elphinstone Institution. After editing a Gujarati paper, he became manager of the Bombay Times. He spent 1858–9 in England, where he wrote The Parsis: their history, manners, customs, and religion. Returning to India, he held a number of legal and official positions. He became chairman of the Bombay Municipal Corporation.

He was selected Sheriff of Mumbai for 1872.

His grandson, also named Dosabhai Framji Karaka, was also a reputed journalist. As member of the Oxford Union he became Treasurer, Secretary and Librarian before being elected the first President thereof of South Asian origin, succeeding his close friend Michael Foot.
