= William Henry Drake =

Australian politician

Sir William Henry Drake, KCB, (29 September 1812 – 28 January 1882) was a British public servant and Colonial Treasurer of Western Australia.

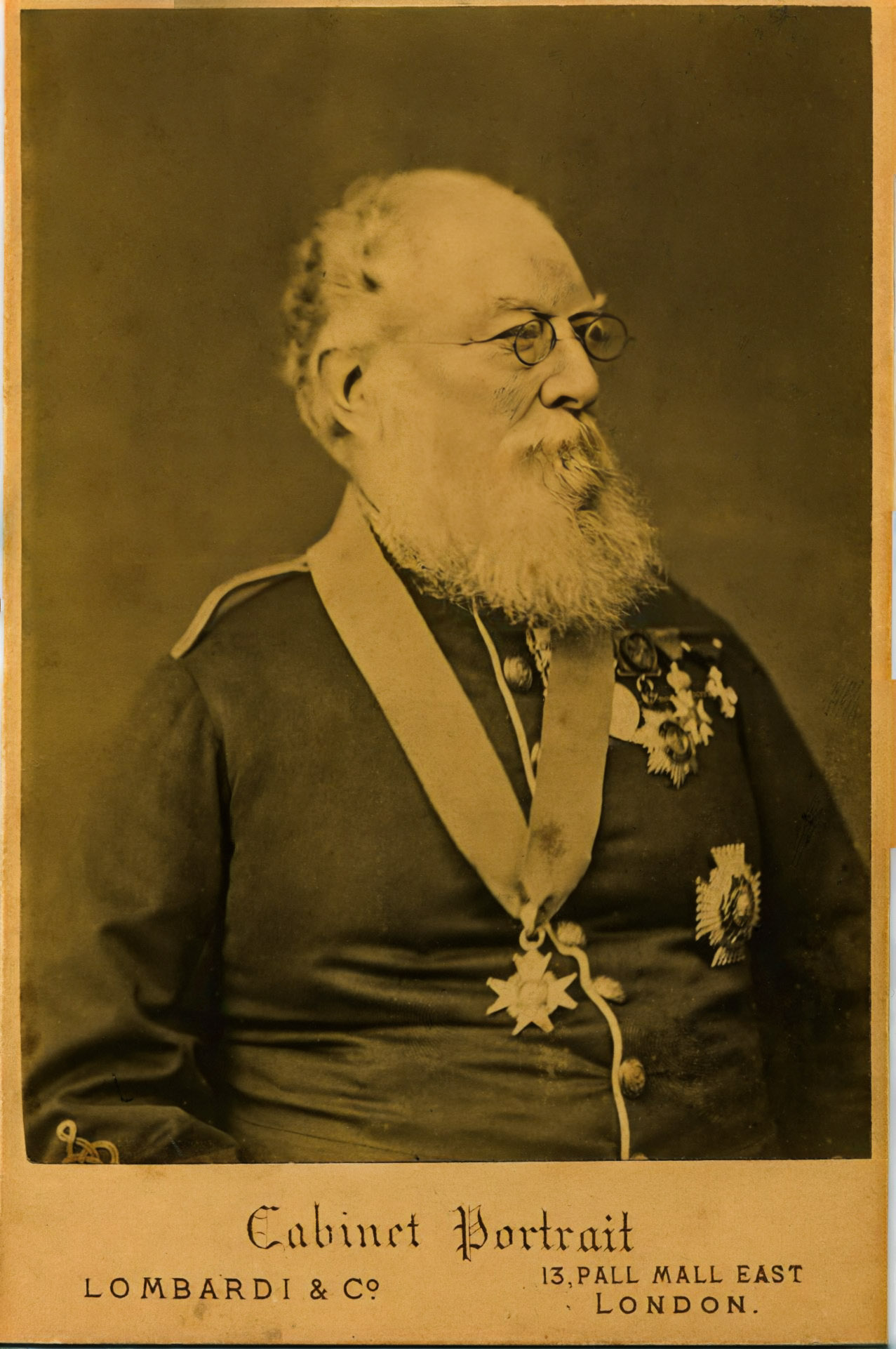
William Henry Drake c1871.

Drake was born at Coimbra, Portugal during the Peninsular War. He was the son of John Drake of Exmouth, Devon, Deputy Commissary-General, by Maria, daughter of George Story, of Silksworth Hall, County Durham, and entered the War Office in 1831. Drake was Colonial Treasurer of Western Australia from 1838 to 1848, appointed Assistant Commissary-General in 1845, and four years later was advanced to the post of Commissary-General. In this capacity he served in various colonies, as well as in the Crimea and at Kerch, with his experiences of the Crimea recorded in many letters to his wife and parents. He also had charge of the Turkish contingent.

In 1867, Drake was appointed Controller for Ireland, and two years afterwards Controller for Great Britain in the War Office. From 1871 to 1877 he held the office of Director of Supplies and Transports.

Drake was nominated a Companion of the Order of the Bath in 1856, after the conclusion of the Russian war, and was advanced to a Knight Commander of that Order, in 1871. Drake was twice married, first, in 1834, to Louisa, daughter of Mr. James Purkis, and secondly, in 1862, to Elizabeth Lucy, daughter of the Hon. George Wood, member of the Council at the Cape of Good Hope.

Drake died on 28 January 1882 at Clanricarde Gardens, Bayswater, London, England.
