= John Chetham McLeod =

Scottish army officer and colonial administrator

Lieutenant-General Sir John Chetham McLeod GCB
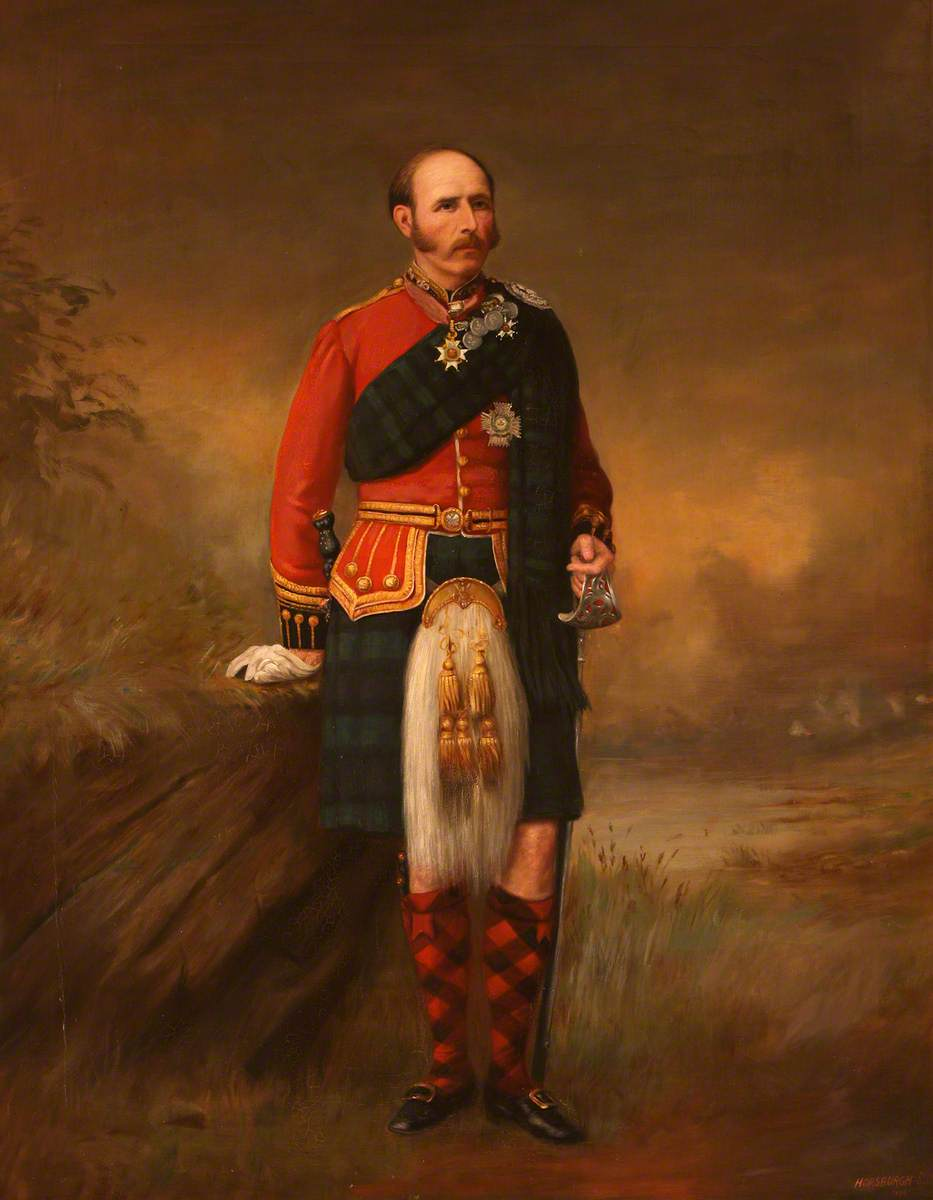
- McLeod in 1888
- Born: 23 January 1831
- Died: 10 January 1914 (aged 82)
- Allegiance: United Kingdom
- Branch: British Army
- Service years: 1846–1892
- Rank: Lieutenant-General
- Commands: General Officer Commanding, Ceylon; 42nd Regiment of Foot
- Awards: Knight Grand Cross of the Order of the Bath

Lieutenant-General Sir John Chetham McLeod GCB (23 January 1831 – 10 January 1914) was a Scottish British Army officer and colonial administrator.

== Military career ==
McLeod was born in Ceylon, and educated at Perth Academy and the University of St Andrews. He was commissioned into the 42nd Regiment of Foot as an ensign in 1846 and served in the Crimean War. He was with his regiment in India during the Indian Rebellion of 1857 and was made a Companion of the Order of the Bath in the 1871 Birthday Honours. McLeod took command of the 42nd in March 1868 and fought in the third of the Anglo-Ashanti wars, for which he was knighted. He relinquished command in September 1877 and was appointed Assistant Adjutant-General in Scotland. McLeod subsequently served in Belfast before assuming the position of General Officer Commanding, Ceylon. He acted as Governor of Ceylon during the temporary absence of Sir Arthur Hamilton-Gordon from June to November 1885. He was made a Knight Grand Cross of the Order of the Bath in the 1891 Birthday Honours and placed on retired pay 1 April 1892. He was appointed Colonel of the Black Watch on 26 February 1907. He died in London in 1914.
