= Lionel Robert Ashburner =

British diplomat

Lionel Robert Ashburner CSI (1827 in Tasmania – 26 January 1907 in Marylebone, London) was the Acting governor of Bombay during the British Raj from 13 March 1880 to 28 April 1880.

== Biography ==
Lionel, son of William Page Ashburner and his wife Hester Maria, was a civil servant in India, where he became a director of the Great Indian Peninsular Railway. In the 1871 Birthday Honours, he was appointed a Companion of the Order of the Star of India.

On 14 July 1873 he married Emily Caroline Haggard at Kirkee, Bombay.
