= K. T. Telang =

Indian judge and indologist (1850–1893)

K. T. Telang CIE

Member of Bombay Legislative Council
- In office 1884–c. 1890
- Governor: James Fergusson; Lord Reay
- Constituency: Nominated

Personal details
- Born: Kashinath Trimbak Telang; 20 August 1850 Bombay, British India
- Died: 1 September 1893 (aged 43) Bombay, British India
- Party: Indian National Congress
- Education: Elphinstone College (M.A., LL.B.)
- Occupation: Indologist; politician; judge

Kashinath Trimbak Telang CIE (20 August 1850 – 1 September 1893), better known as K. T. Telang, was an Indian indologist, politician, and judge at the Bombay High Court.

== Early life and education ==
Telang was born in a Gaud Saraswat Brahmin (GSB) family. At the age of five Telang was sent to the Amarchaud Wadi vernacular school, and in 1859 entered the high school in Bombay which bears the name of Mountstuart Elphinstone. Here he came under the influence of Narayan Mahadev Purmanand, a teacher of intellect and force of character, afterwards one of Telang's most intimate friends.

As a student, Telang won the Bhugwandas scholarship in Sanskrit, and in this language his later studies were profound. From this school he passed to the Elphinstone College, of which he became a fellow, and after taking the degree of M.A. and LL.B., decided to follow the example of Bal Mangesh Wagle, the first Indian admitted by the judges to practise on the original side of the high court, a position more like the status of a barrister than a vakil or pleader. He passed the examination and was enrolled in 1872.

== Career ==
=== Legal career ===
By profession an advocate of the high court, he also took a vigorous share in literary, social, municipal and political work, as well as in the affairs of the University of Bombay, over which he presided as vice-chancellor for two years (1892-1893) until his death. His learning and other gifts soon brought him an extensive practice. He had complete command of the English language, and his intimacy with Sanskrit enabled him to study and quote the Hindu law-books with an ease not readily attained by European counsel. He was one of the counsel for the defendant, Rukhmabai in the famous restitution of conjugal rights brought by her husband. Telang, finding his career assured, declined an offer of official employment. But in 1889 he accepted a seat on the high court bench, where his judgments are recognized as authoritative, especially on the Hindu law.

=== Educationalist ===
He was syndic of the university from 1881, and vice-chancellor from 1892 until his death. In that year also he was elected President of the Bombay Branch of the Royal Asiatic Society. These two offices had never been held by a native of India before. The decoration of C.I.E. conferred on him in the 1884 Birthday Honours was a recognition of his services as a member of Hunter Commission appointed by the colonial government to deal with the educational system of India.

=== Politics ===
Telang was active in politics from 1872 to 1889. He was nominated to the Bombay legislative council in 1884, but declined a similar position on the viceroy's council. He and fellow Bombay lawyers, Pherozshah Mehta, and Badruddin Tyabji were the founders of the Bombay Presidency Association. He was the secretary of reception committee for the inaugural meeting of the Indian National Congress in 1885.

=== Sanskrit scholar ===
His translation of the Bhagavad Gita into English prose and verse is a standard work, and available in Prof. Max Müller's monumental compilation, the Sacred Books of the East, volume 8, as the Bhagavadgita With the Sanatsugâtiya and the Anugitâ (published 1882). Also notable is his publication, in 1884, of the historical Sanskrit play, Mudrarakshasa of Vishakhadatta under the auspices of the Education Department and the Government Central Book Depot, Bombay. He criticized Albrecht Weber's hypothesis that the story of the Ramayana was influenced by the Homeric epics. While devoted to the sacred classics of the Hindus, Telang did not neglect his own vernacular, Marathi literature being enriched by his translation of Lessing's Nathan the Wise, and an essay on Social Compromise.

== Works ==
- The Bhagavadgîtâ With the Sanatsugâtîya and the Anugîtâ (1882)
- Rise of the Maráthá Power (1900)
- Mudrarakshasa With the Commentary of Dhundiraja (1915)
