= Vishvanath Narayan Mandlik =

Indian lawyer, writer and social activist

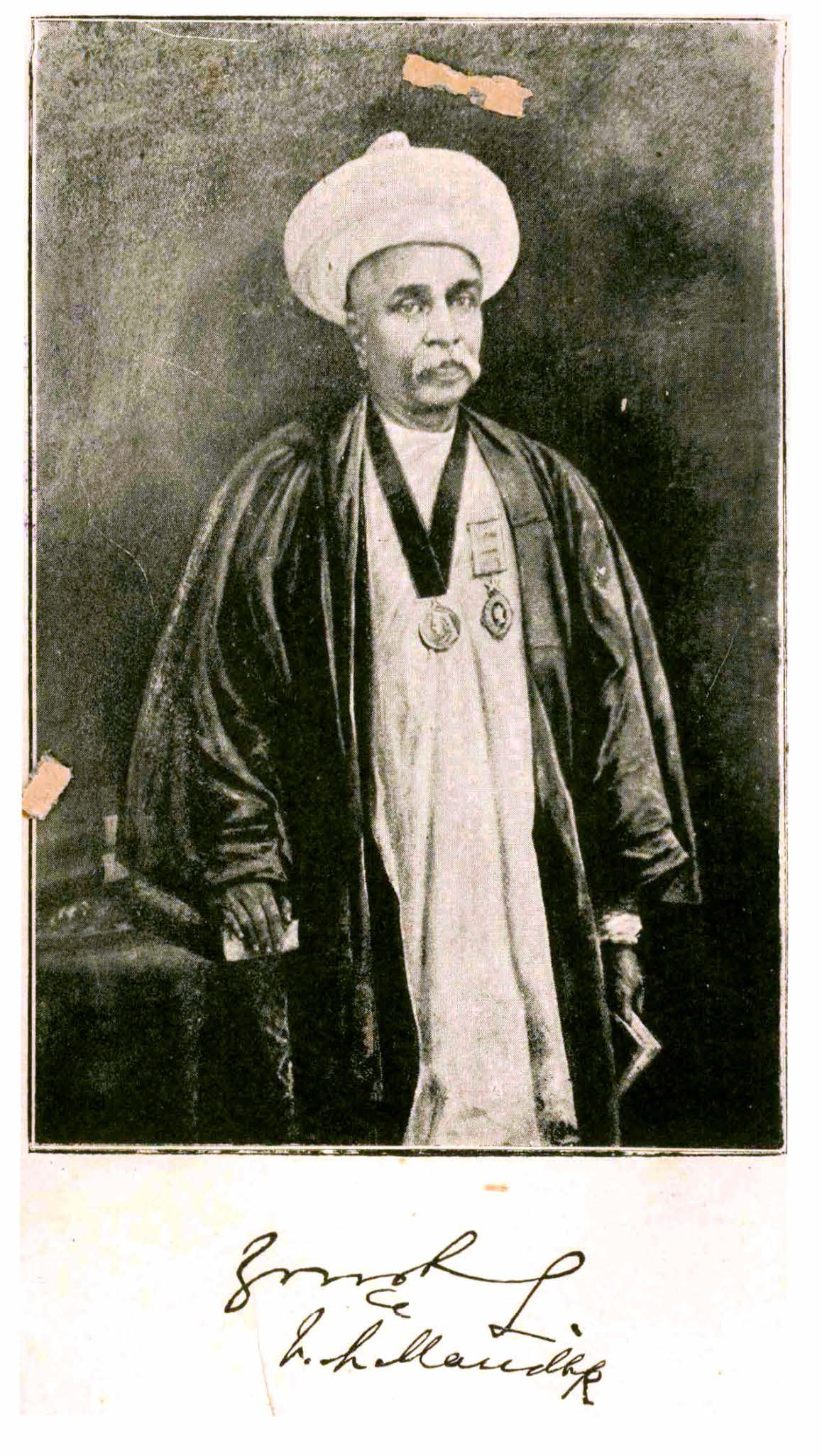
Portrait

Vishvanath Narayan Mandlik, C.S.I. (8 March 1833 – 9 May 1899) was an eminent Bombay citizen, lawyer, author and a legal expert on Hindu law. Although a conservative when dealing in several cases involving Hindu traditions (where he opposed state intervention), he supported some reforms such as education for women. He also translated several English classics and law books into Marathi. He also wrote several works on Hindu Law in English, including translations of Yajnyawalkya's Smriti, the Manu Smriti and Nilakantha's Vywahara-mayukha. He founded a bi-weekly in English called the Native Opinion in 1864 to which he was the sole contributor in the early years.

== Life and work ==
Mandlik was born in Muruda village in Ratnagiri District where his mother's side came from a Peshwa ruler. His great grand father was a Subedar, a provincial governor. He learnt at home from his grandfather Dhondopant and from the village school. He studied under Rao Bahadur Ramachandra Balkrishna at Ratnagiri and at the age of fourteen he joined the Elphinstone Institution where he received the Clare scholarship. He was advised by professor Patton to study in England and compete for the Indian Civil Service but his family preferred that he stayed in India. He became a personal assistant to Sir George Le Grand Jacob, Political Agent in Sindh. He resigned in 1862 and took the High Court Pleader's examination and began practice in Bombay. He became one of the few Indians who knew English and the civil law and his only rivals were Shantaram Narayan and Justice Nanabhai Haridas. In 1884 Mandlik was appointed as government pleader.

Mandlik was also a writer and an active member of Bombay University (where he was often an examiner in Marathi and in Law) and the Municipal Corporation. He was appointed a Justice of the Peace in 1865. He took part in many public debates and was a well known citizen of Bombay. He served on the Supreme Legislative Council of India where his expertise on Hindu Law was held in high esteem.

He was one of the main witness in Mahraj Libel Case from defendant side.

In 1888 he was diagnosed with Bright's disease and he moved to his home Hermitage located in the better climate of Cumbala Hill where was treated. He died on 9 May 1889. He had adopted his sister's son after the death of his sister and his own wife died in 1879.
