= Induprakash =

Defunct weekly bi-lingual periodical arguing for Indian independence

Indu Prakash
- Type: Weekly bilingual periodical
- Format: Print
- Founder: Vishnushastri Pandit
- Founded: 1862
- Ceased publication: Early 1900s
- Political alignment: Pro-Indian independence
- Language: Marathi, English
- Headquarters: Bombay, British India

Indu Prakash was an Anglo - Marathi periodical published from Bombay in the late 1800s and early 1900s. Established by Vishnushastri Pandit in 1862, it was published as a weekly bi-lingual periodical and often contained articles supporting the Indian freedom movement and criticism of the British colonial rule. It was later merged in Lokmanya . Ranade, Telang, Chandwarakar, Parvate were involved in success of Induprakash. K.G.Deshpande who was in charge of Induprakash requested Sri Aurobindo to write about the current Political situation. Aurobindo Ghosh began writing a series of fiery articles under the title "New Lamps for Old" where in he strongly criticised the Congress for its moderate policy

The newspaper's name means Moon light in English.
