= John Muir-Mackenzie =

Indian politician

Sir John Muir Mackenzie KCSI
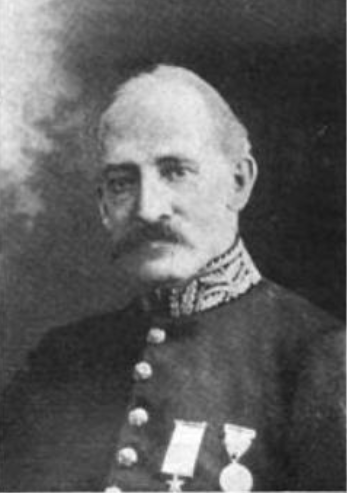
- Born: John William Pitt Muir Mackenzie; 19 March 1854; France
- Died: 25 October 1916 (aged 62); London, England
- Education: Eton College
- Occupation(s): Civil servant, colonial administrator

Sir John William Pitt Muir Mackenzie KCSI (19 March 1854 – 25 October 1916) was the acting governor of Bombay during the British Raj from 27 July 1907 to 18 October 1907.

== Biography ==
John Muir Mackenzie was born in France in 1854. The son of Sir John William Pitt Muir Mackenzie, 2nd Baronet, he was educated at Eton College. An older brother was Kenneth Muir Mackenzie, 1st Baron Muir Mackenzie.

He died at his home in London on 25 October 1916. His son-in-law was the cricketer and soldier William Drysdale.
