= Bania (caste) =

Indian mercantile caste

Bania (also spelled Baniya, Banija, Banya, Vaniya, Vani, Vania, and Vanya) is a mercantile caste primarily from the Indian states of Rajasthan and Gujarat, with significant diasporic communities in Uttar Pradesh, Madhya Pradesh, West Bengal, Maharashtra (particularly Mumbai) and other northern states of India.

Traditionally, the Bania community has been associated with occupations such as trade, banking, and money-lending. In modern times, many members of the community are involved in various business and entrepreneurial ventures.

== Etymology ==
The Hindi term baniyā is derived from Sanskrit vaṇija ("trader"), whereas the Marwari bā̃ṇyõ and Gujarati vāṇiyo are derived from Sanskrit vāṇija ("trader"). The community is also known by the term "vanik".

In Bengal the term Bania is a functional catch-all for moneylenders, indigenously developed bankers, readers of grocery items and spices, irrespective of caste. In Maharashtra, the term vani is used for traders/usurers who tended to rather be Kunbis by caste. Europeans used the term banyan loosely to mean "trader", whether regardless if the individual was a member of the Baniya caste or simply a trader who could be a Brahmin, Muslim, or Parsi.

== Society ==
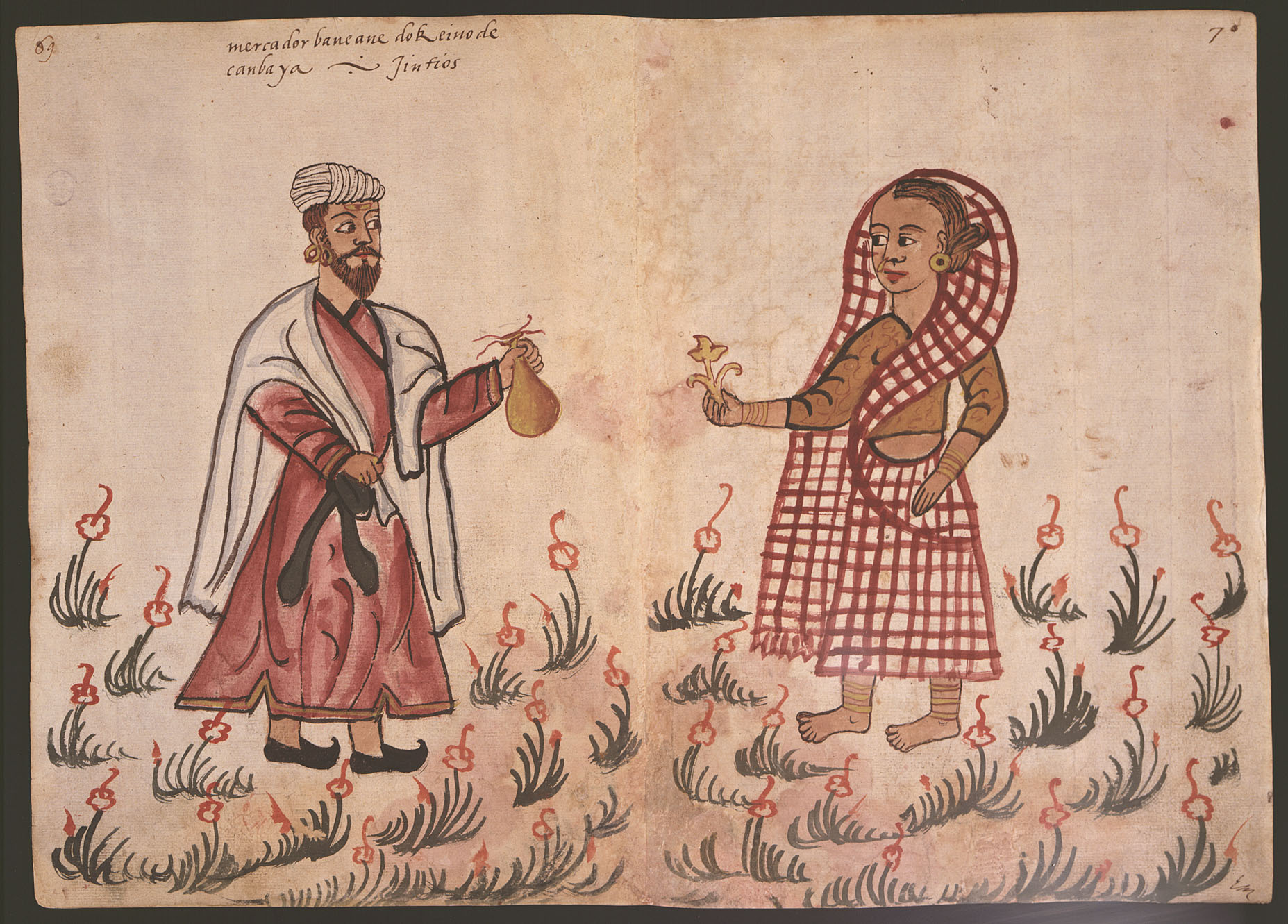
16th century Portuguese painting of a Baneane merchant man and woman from Cambay.

The community is composed of several sub-castes including the Agarwal, Khandelwal, Maheshwari, Oswal, Porwad and Shrimali Baniyas. Traditionally (dating to at least the 15th century), the Gujarati Baniyas had 84 divisions (as did Gujarati Brahmins), although many were simply formulaic. Subcastes are also divided into Visa and Dasa divisions, which are also centuries old, and prohibit intermarriage.

The Baniyas as a caste are either Jains or Hindus (mostly Vaishnava of the Vallabha sampradaya), and are native inhabitants of Gujarat and Rajasthan. In Rajasthan in particular, higher status Baniyas preferred to call themselves mahajans. Outside of Rajasthani, those Baniyas were known as "Marwaris" although technically a Marwari could be of any caste. The Gujarati and Rajasthani Baniyas have served as the prototypical Indian merchant, resulting in other non-Baniya mercantile communities sometimes also being called Baniyas. Scholars have noted that Baniyas however have certain cultural traits that distinguish them from other traders, such as nonviolence/pacifism. Lohanas and Bhatias of Saurashtra and Sindh (who are also mercantile and Pushtimarga Vaishnavas) although sometimes called baniyas are sharply distinguished from the Baniya caste due to their martial ethos. Daudi Bohras whose business practicies are nearly identical to Baniyas and who consider Diwali as the start of the financial year are not considered part of the Baniya caste due to their nonvegetarianism, beards, and clothing traditions.

It is hypothesized by historians that the Vaishnav Vaniyas of Gujarat are the descendants of the now-extinct Buddhist merchants who were formerly present in the region.

Banias are composed of caste in the mercantile and business fields, which have delineated the Baniya identity. The term baniya has historically been applied to various mercantile communities who belong to diverse castes.

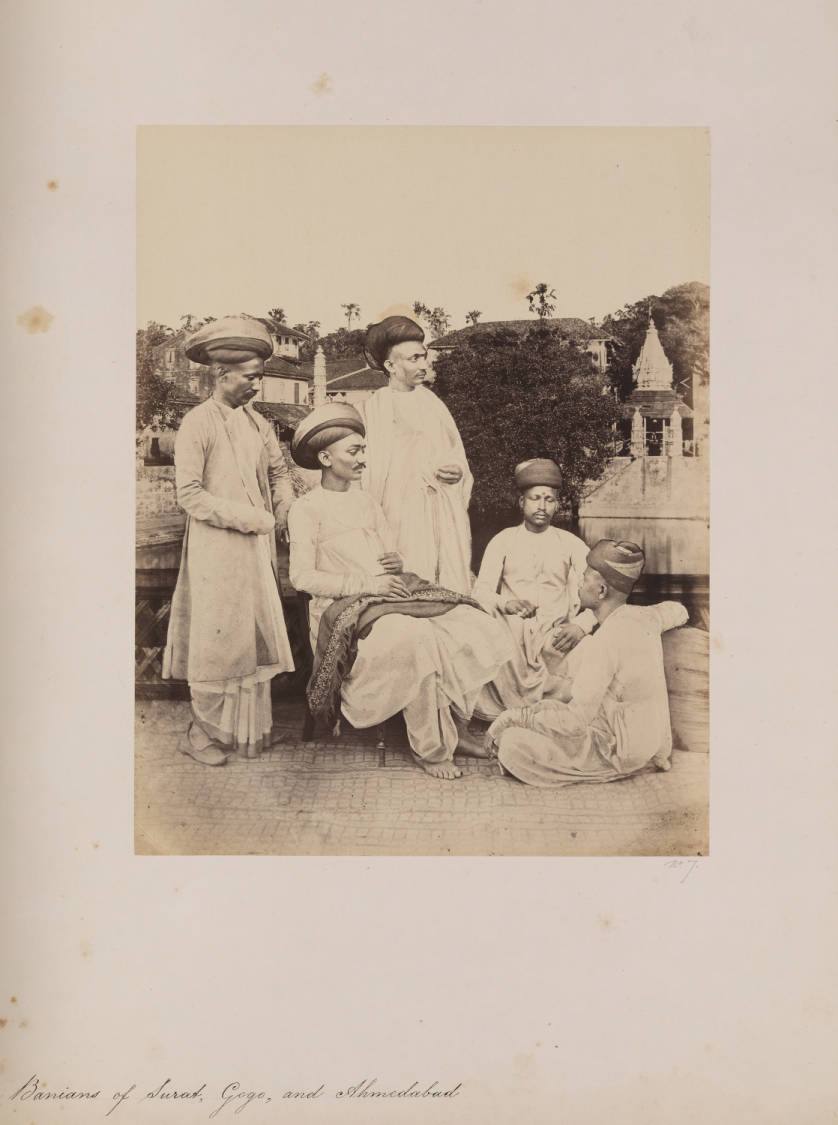
Bania men of Surat, Gogo, and Ahmedabad, Gujarat, British India.

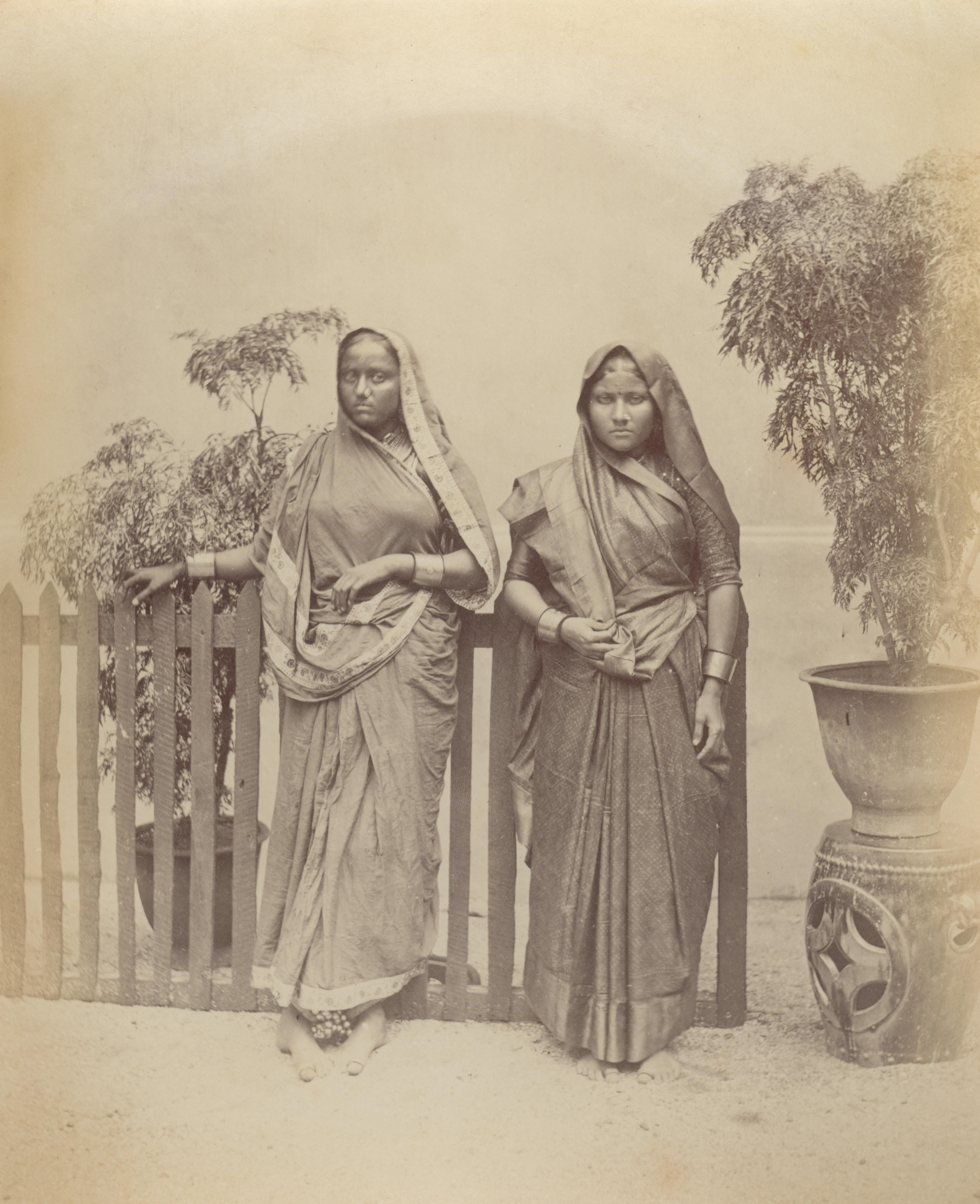
Bania women in British India. Image taken before 1860.

Baniyas are vegetarians, and some groups have greater restrictions on the foods that can be consumed. They also take care not to kill insects when preparing and eating food.

Baniyas were known to be hard working and frugal. Only minimum expenses would be made on clothing, food, and furniture.

During the day, Baniya boys were sent to schools called patshalas where they would learn business skills and habits. They learned how to read and write, as well as in secret merchant scripts that were hidden from non-Baniyas. They also learned ciphers, accounting, and arithmetic. The correctness of mathematical calculations was extremely important to Baniyas, and they learnt various methods and tricks so they could perform advanced mental arithmetic. A mercantile ethos was also instilled in the boys, as they learned the chief aim of life was to acquire wealth and only profitable transactions were worthwhile. After school hours, boys would spend time in the family shop and learn the business. After education was complete boys would try to start their own businesses and if successful, would be allowed to manage the family business.

In order to prepare for further business success, Baniyas also had to have high levels of information access. They had messengers, intelligence networks, and postal services in order to make sure that they knew about any important knowledge as early as possible. Such information was often used in speculation in futures exchanges, which in turn sometimes turned into gambling.

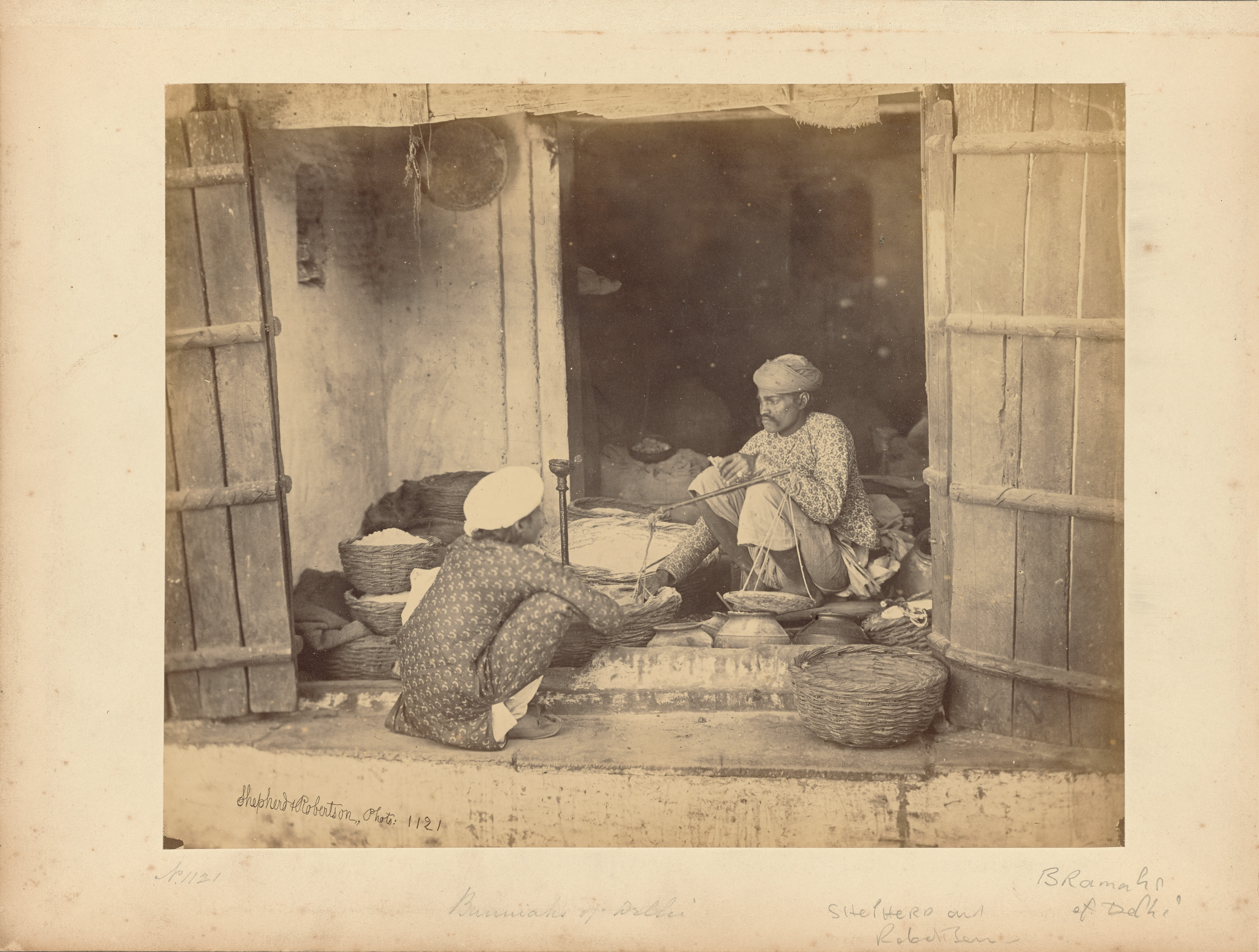
Baniyas of Delhi

Honour was very important to Baniyas, which they called abru. Their honour was tied to their credit worthiness, which were valued higher than their lives. A bankrupt Baniya was stigmatised, and those who were caught to be dishonest with another Baniya were boycotted, bankrupted, and stigmatised. Honour was also tied to socioreligious conduct, as maintaining marital relations within the community, having a strong patriarch, and adherence to religious principles were all highly valued.

Wealthy Baniyas only spent large sums of money for specific purposes: hosting feasts, buying jewellery (mainly for women), construction of havelis, and the most honourable being donating to religious causes such as temples or religious festivals. Such displays of wealth allowed Baniyas to show their status and high honour.

Baniyas historically are very religious, with the Jain and Hindu Vaishnavs' beliefs, rituals, prayers, and ceremonies being often very similar. Pushtimarg Vaishnavs would perform emotional seva to Krishna, and Jains would be austere and follow the Jain vows. Lakshmi Puja was performed by Baniyas, for Lakshmi to bestow wealth and welfare on the family.

According to Basu, the culture of Gujarati Baniyas is viewed ambivalently by outsiders, stating "on the one hand, it is associated negatively with usury and commercial calculation, and on the other, it carries positive connotations of Jaina and Vaiṣṇava religious traditions that place special emphasis upon values of vegetarianism, nonviolence (ahiṃsā), and purity".

They are described as belonging to the Vaishya varna.

== Notable people ==
- Thakkar Pheru (early 14th century) (Shrimali), treasurer, mint director, and numismatics author in the court of Alauddin Khalji
- Jhaveri family (Oswal)
  - Shantidas Jhaveri (1584–1659), Indian jeweller, bullion trader, and moneylender
  - Khushalchand Jhaveri (1680–1748), Indian jeweller and financier
  - Lalbhai Dalpatbhai (1863-1912), Gujarati industrialist
- Jagat Seth family (Oswal), merchant, banker and money lender family in Bengal
- Girdhar (1787–1852) (Lad), Gujarati poet
- Family of Mahatma Gandhi (Modh) (Note: The Gandhis were expelled from their caste when Mahatma Gandhi crossed the seas.)
- Premchand Roychand (1832–1906) (Oswal), 19th century Indian businessman and founder of Bombay Stock Exchange.
- Karsandas Mulji (1832-1871) (Kapol), Gujarati writer and social reformer (Note: Karsandas Mulji was expelled from his caste for travelling to England in 1862, and he never attempted to rejoin.)
- Mangaldas Nathubhai (1832-1890) (Kapol), Gujarati merchant in Bombay
- Hargovinddas Kantawala (1844-1930), Gujarati writer
- Birla family (Maheshwari), a prominent Business and Industrialist family. (Note: The Birlas were expelled from their caste in 1922 when Rameshwar Das Birla married a Kolvar woman.)
- Lala Lajpat Rai (1865-1912) (Agarwal), Indian independence activist.
- Krishnalal Jhaveri (1868-1957), Indian scholar and judge
- Seth Hukumchand (1874-1959), Indian industrialist
- Walchand Hirachand (1882-1953), Indian industrialist and founder of Walchand group
- Maithili Sharan Gupt (1886-1964), Hindi poet.
- Sarabhai family (Daśā Śrīmāḷī), a prominent Business family.
- Shankarlal Banker, Indian independence activist (Note: Shankarlal Banker (along with his family) was expelled from his caste for travelling to England in 1911 and eating meat while he was there.)
- Balwantrai Mehta (1899 - 1965) (Ghoghārī Daśā Poravāḍa), Indian politician who served as the second Chief Minister of Gujarat
- Ram Manohar Lohia (1910-1967), Indian independence activist.
- Dalmia and Sahu Jain families, industrialist families
- Dhirubhai Ambani (1932-2002), 20th century Indian businessman.
- Amit Shah (1964–present), Indian politician.
- Arvind Kejriwal (1968–present), Indian politician and current Chief Minister of Delhi.
- Brij Behari Prasad, former Science and Technology minister in Lalu Prasad Yadav's cabinet.

== See also ==
- Vaishya
- Kasaundhan Bania
