= University of Mumbai =

Public university in Mumbai, Maharashtra, India

- Coat of arms
- Other name: Mumbai University
- Former name: University of Bombay (1857–1995)
- Motto: Śīlavṛttaphalā Vidyā (Sanskrit)
- Motto in English: The Fruit of Learning is Character and Righteous Conduct
- Type: Public University
- Established: 18 July 1857; 169 years ago
- Founders: Jagannath Shankarseth; Bhau Daji; John Wilson
- Accreditation: NAAC
- Academic affiliations: UGC; AIU; ACU
- Chancellor: Governor of Maharashtra
- Vice-Chancellor: Ravindra D. Kulkarni
- Students: 7,579
- Undergraduates: 1,459
- Postgraduates: 5,638
- Location: Mumbai, Maharashtra, India; 18°58′30″N 72°49′33″E
- Campus: Urban All Campuses: 250 acres (1,000,000 m^{2})
- Colours: Saffron
- Website: mu.ac.in

University of Mumbai is a public state university in Mumbai. It is one of the largest university systems in the world with over 549,000 students on its campuses and affiliated colleges. As of 2013, the university had 711 affiliated colleges.

It was established in 1857 as the University of Bombay following a dispatch from Sir Charles Wood, President of the Board of Control, to Governor-General Lord Dalhousie. There are courses available covering science, commerce and the arts.

== History ==
Wood's despatch, drafted by Sir Charles Wood in 1854, advocated a range of educational reforms in India, including the establishment of universities in major Indian cities. As such, the University of Bombay was established in 1857 after the presentation of a petition from the Bombay Association to the Imperial Government of India. The university was modelled on similar universities in the United Kingdom, specifically the University of London.

The first departments established were the Faculty of Arts at Elphinstone College in 1835 and the Faculty of Medicine at Grant Medical College in 1845. Both colleges existed before the university was founded and surrendered their degree-granting privileges to the university. The first degrees awarded in 1862 were Bachelor of Arts and Licentiate in Medicine. Medical schools such as Sindh Medical School in Hyderabad, Sindh were affiliated with the university as well.

Cornelia Sorabji, who later studied law at Somerville College, becoming Oxford's first female law student and India's first female advocate, was the university's first female graduate in 1888.

Until 1904, the university only conducted examinations, awarded affiliations to colleges, developed curricula, and produced guidelines for colleges developing curricula. Teaching departments, research disciplines, and post-graduate courses were introduced from 1904, and several additional departments were established. After India achieved independence in 1947, the functions and powers of the university were reorganized under the Bombay University Act of 1953. The name of the university was changed from University of Bombay to University of Mumbai in 1996.

In 1949, student enrolment was 42,272 with 80 affiliated colleges. By 1975, these numbers had grown to 156,190 and 114, respectively.

=== Kalina Campus ===
Examination processes were made more efficient by the introduction of online delivery of question papers for examinations, and assessment of answer books by scanning at remote examination centres. The academic depository of the university was started in collaboration with CDSL in 2015. The university is the first university in the country to start an academic depository.

- Jawaharlal Nehru Library
- Alkesh Dinesh Mody Institute for Financial and Management Studies (ADMI) which offers BMS, MFSM, MS Finance & MMS programmes

=== Library ===
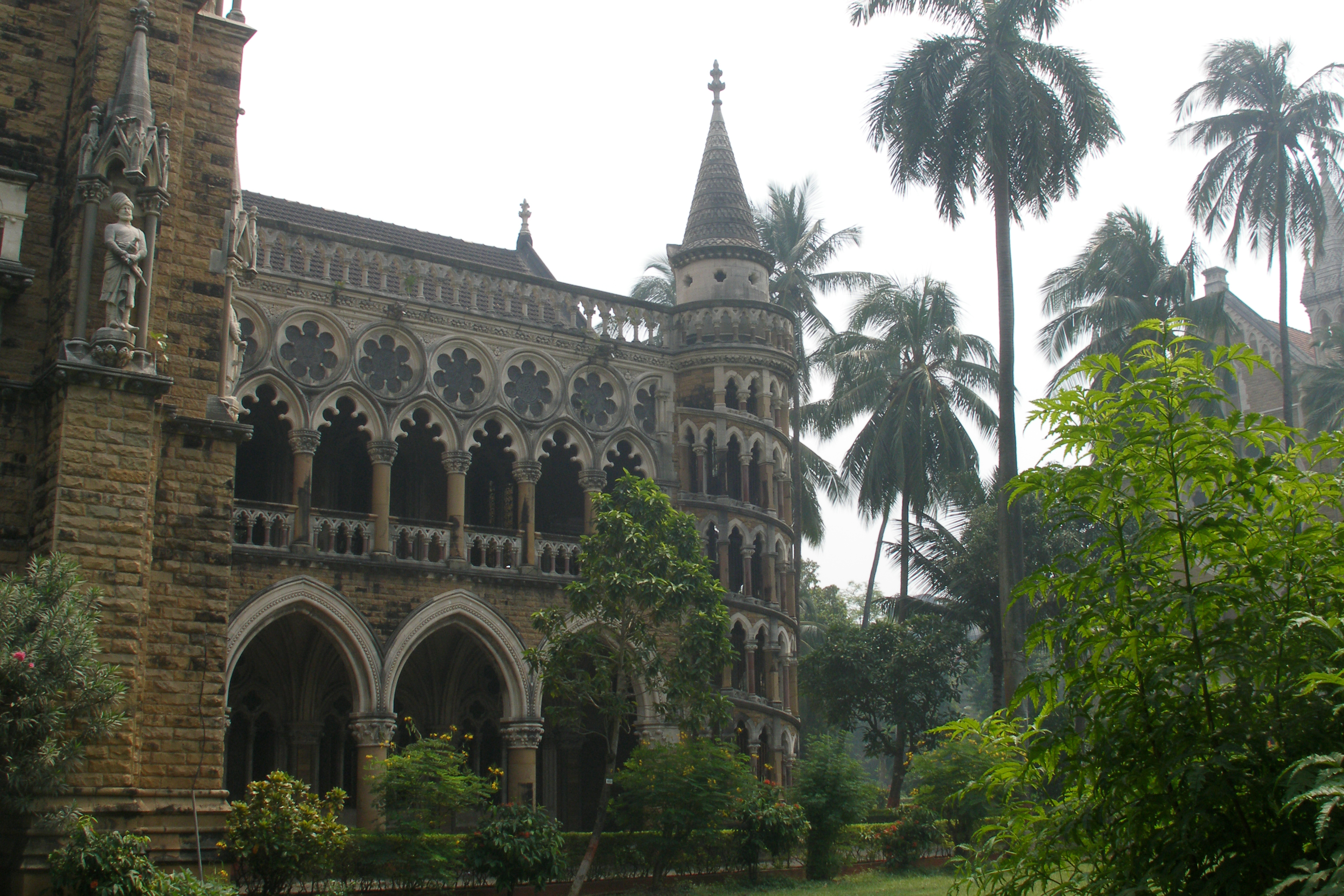
University Library at the Fort Campus.

==== Rajabai Clock Tower ====
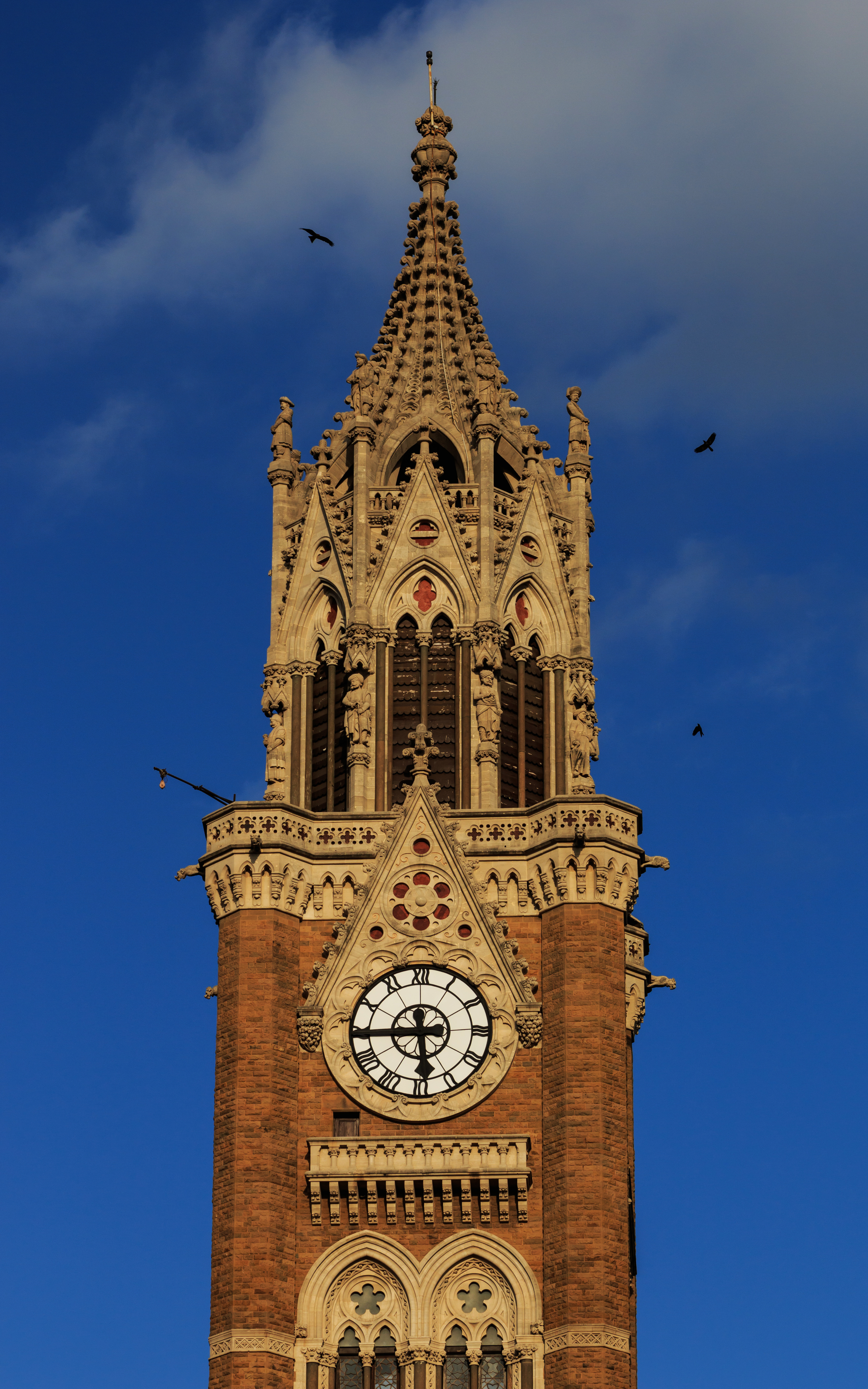
Rajabai Clock Tower, located at the Fort campus, was built in 1878.

One of Mumbai's landmarks, the Rajabai Clock Tower, was completed in the 1870s and houses the University of Mumbai's library. Sir George Gilbert Scott modeled the Rajabai Clock Tower on the clock tower of the Palace of Westminster in London. Local businessman Premchand Roychand contributed to the cost of construction and named the tower in memory of his mother, Rajabai. The tower is 85 m (280 ft) tall and has five storeys. At a height of 9.1 m (30 ft) from the ground, there are eight statues representing the Indian castes. The tower clock is reported to have played 16 tunes including "Rule Britannia", "God Save the Queen", "Home! Sweet Home!" and "A Handel Symphony". On the initiative of the then Vice-Chancellor, Rajan Welukar, the first phase of restoration of Rajabai Clock Tower started in 2013 and was completed in May 2015. Tata Consultancy Services (TCS) gave a Rs 4 crore grant for this phase of the restoration project.

== Affiliated colleges ==
Its jurisdiction extends over 7 districts – Mumbai City district, Mumbai Suburban district, Palghar district, Raigad district, Ratnagiri district, Sindhudurg district, Thane district.

=== Prominent institutes ===
Several departments of the University of Mumbai are part of vocational institutions and are not located on the four Mumbai campuses. These include the departments of Medicine and Medical Research located in many prominent hospitals in Mumbai, such as the Tata Memorial Hospital, Bombay Hospital and Seth G.S. Medical College and King Edward Memorial Hospital. The Department of Medicine at Tata Memorial Hospital is now affiliated with the Homi Bhabha National Institute.

The Government Law College, Mumbai, which holds the title for being the oldest law school in Asia, was established in 1855, predating the establishment of the University itself. However, it was only in 1860 that the Government Law College became affiliated to the University of Mumbai.

Institute of Chemical Technology (then known as the University Department of Chemical Technology, UDCT), was originally a department of MU, which later gained the status of a university.

Veermata Jijabai Technological Institute, then known as the Victoria Jubilee Technical Institute, founded in 1887, was the first Engineering Institute of the University of Mumbai. Thadomal Shahani Engineering College was the first Engineering college in the University of Mumbai to start courses in Computer Engineering, Information Technology, Electronics Engineering and Biomedical Engineering.

== Libraries ==
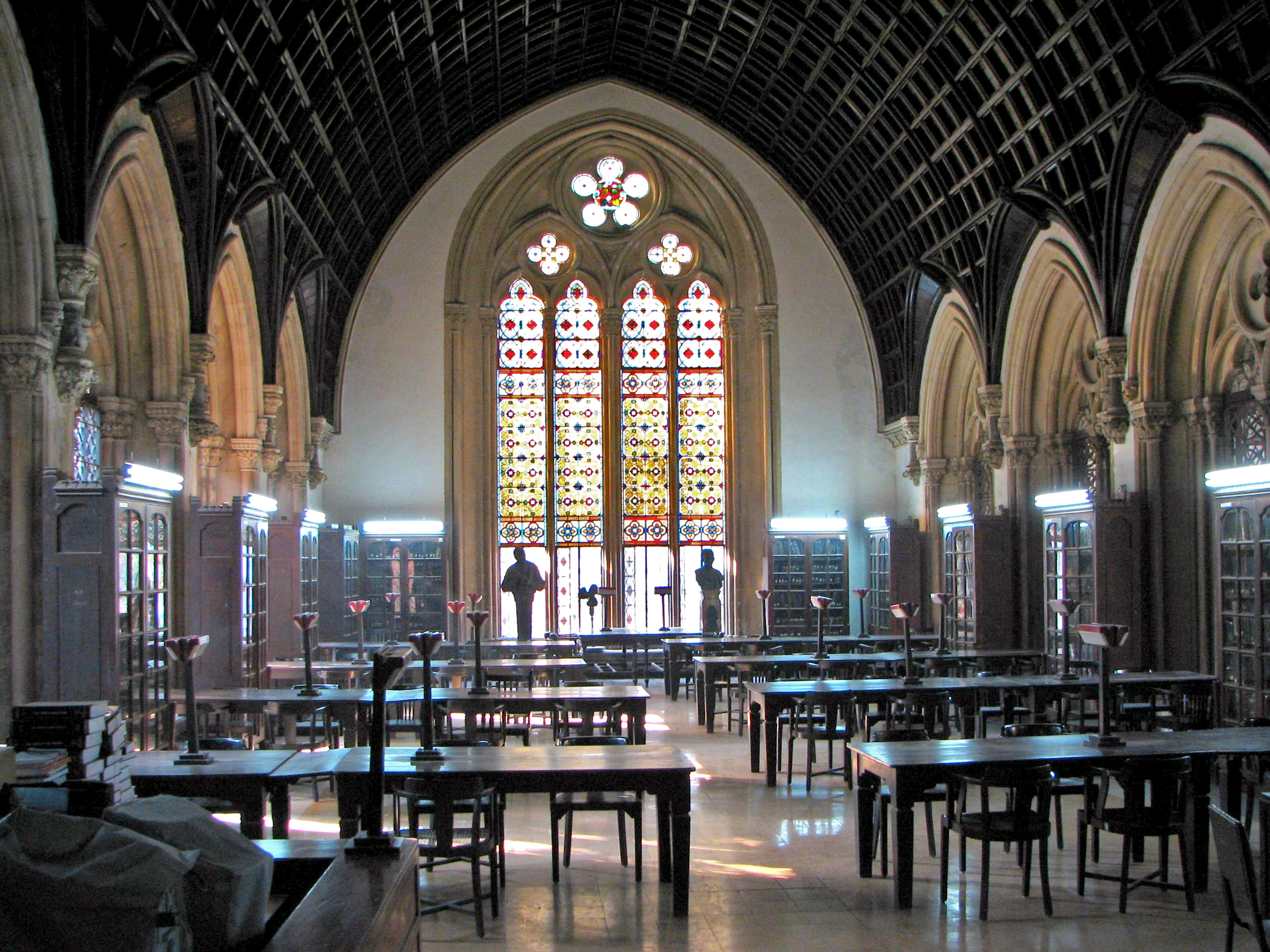
The Fort campus library.

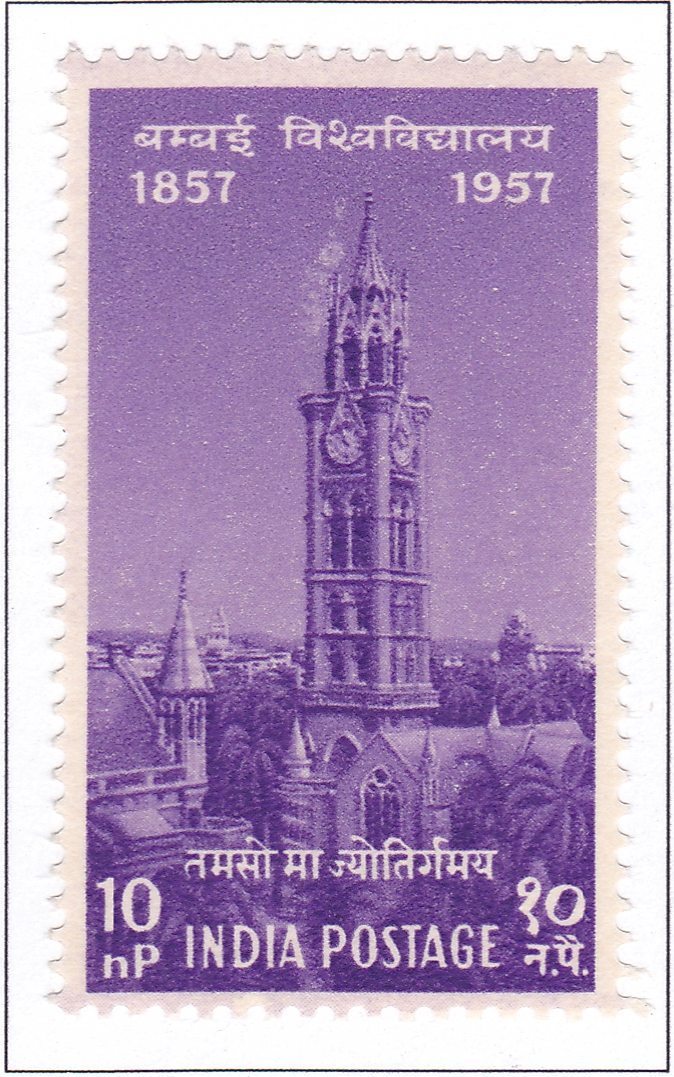
A cenetary commemorative postage stamp

Jawaharlal Nehru Library (JNL) is the central library, located on the campus at Kalina. By May 2019, it was desperately in need of restoration, and it was said to have been in a dire state for the prior two years.

== Vice-chancellors ==
- John Wilson – 1857
- Raymond West
- Alexander Kinloch Forbes
- Sir Alexander Grant, 10th Baronet – 1863–1868
- William Guyer Hunter – 1869
- Herbert Mills Birdwood
- Rev. Dugald Mackichan – 1888–91
- Kashinath Trimbak Telang – 1892–1893
- Ramkrishna Gopal Bhandarkar – 1893–1894
- N. G. Chandavarkar – 1911–1912
- John Heaton – 1912–1915
- Pherozeshah Mehta – 1915
- Sir Leslie Orme Wilson (Chancellor) – 1927
- Mirza Akbar Khan – 1930–31
- R. P. Paranjpye – 1934
- Sir Rustom Pestonji Masani – 1941
- Pandurang Vaman Kane
- John Matthai – 1955–1957
- V. R. Khanolkar – 1960–1963
- Shashikant Karnik
- Trimbak Krishna Tope – 1971–1977
- M. D. Bengalee – 1986–1992
- Snehlata Deshmukh – 1995–2000
- Bhalchandra Mungekar – 2000–2005
- Vijay Khole – 2005 – September 2009
- Chandra Krishnamurthy – September 2009 – July 2010, Acting Vice-Chancellor
- Suhas Pednekar – August 2010 – September 2010, Acting Vice-Chancellor
- Rajan Welukar – October 2010 – July 2015
- Sanjay V. Deshmukh – July 2015 – October 2017
- Suhas Pednekar – April 2018 − April 2023
- Dr. Ravindra D Kulkarni – June 2023 – Present

== Rankings ==
University and college rankings

General – international
- QS (World) (2025): 711–720
- Times (World) (2023): 1201–1500
- Times (Asia) (2022): 351–400
- Times (Emerging) (2022): 351–400

General – India
- NIRF (Overall) (2023): 96
- NIRF (Universities) (2024): 61

Internationally, the University of Mumbai was ranked 751–760 in the QS World University Rankings of 2024 and 291–300 in Asia. It was ranked 1201–1500 in the world by the Times Higher Education World University Rankings of 2023, 351–400 in Asia in 2022 and in the same band among emerging economies.

The National Institutional Ranking Framework (NIRF) ranked it 61st among universities in India in 2024. It also ranked 96th overall in 2023.

== Partner universities ==
Memoranda of Understanding (MoUs) have been signed with University of Amsterdam, University of Bath, Liverpool Hope University, Toronto Metropolitan University, IESEG School of Management, Tianjin University of Technology, Tianjin University, Nankai University in China and Edith Cowan University in Australia.

== See also ==
- List of universities in India
- Universities and colleges in India
- Education in India
