= Kashibai Navrange =

Indian social worker and reformer

- Born: 25 October 1878
- Died: 21 August 1946 (aged 67)
- Citizenship: Indian
- Occupations: Social reformer, physician
- Years active: 1907―1946
- Notable work: Milk Fund, Maternity Hospital (Garbhavati Chikitsalaya), Bombay, Arya Mahila Samaj, Prarthana Samaj
- Father: Vasudevarao Navarange
- Awards: Justice of Peace (1925)

Kashibai Navrange (25 October 1878―21 August 1946) was an Indian social worker and reformer. She started a Milk Fund in the year 1916 for pregnant and lactating mothers under the auspices of the Arya Mahila Samaj. Navrange was the first Indian woman doctor to open her own clinic. She contributed to the field of medical. Kashibai Navrange Road in Mumbai is named after her.

== Biography ==
=== Education ===
First, Kashibai went to Pandita Ramabai's Sharda Sadan. But later, her schooling took place in Huzurpaga, Pune. In 1896, she passed her matric and took admission to Bombay's Wilson College for further education. In 1909, she received a degree in BA. In 1906, she appeared LM & S examination. In 1907, Navrange started his own dispenser at Bhuleshwar.

=== Works ===
Navrange was engaged in various social and reforming activities as the member of Prarthana Samaj. She started taking a separate worship meeting on Sunday for women. In 1916, she ran a Milk Fund for poor women, sending clothes to children, collecting funds.

By starting Garbhavati Chikitsalaya (hospital for pregnant women), Bombay, she gave free medication to poor women. She started some commercial activities to make women self-reliant. In 1922, she established the business institution of women and encouraged women to start various types of work by opening industry, credit banks, buy-selling centers. She was appointed as a Fellow of Mumbai University. Kashibai Navrange was the member of the Mumbai Municipal School Committee and Juvenile Court counselor. Three years before her death, she resigned from the post of President of Prarthana Samaj.

=== Recognition ===
In 1925, the government honoured her with Justice of Peace. Kashibai Navrangre was the first southern woman who received this honour.

== Death and legacy ==
She died on 21 August 1946. Kashibai Navrange Road (previously known as Alexandra Road) in Mumbai's Gamdevi neighbourhood was named after her by the Bombay Municipal Corporation. Arya Mahila Samaj also named the 'Dr. Kashibai Nawrange Memorial Hostel for Women Students' after her.

== See also ==
- Ramabai Ranade
- Pandita Ramabai
