= Unch Majha Zoka =

Marathi language historical TV series

- Genre: Biography
- Based on: Amachyaa Aayushyaatil Kaahi Aathavani by Ramabai Ranade
- Directed by: Viren Pradhan
- Starring: See below
- Opening theme: "Unch Majha Zoka" by Jaanvee Prabhu Arora
- Country of origin: India
- Original language: Marathi
- No. of episodes: 432

Production
- Camera setup: Multi-camera
- Running time: 22 minutes
- Production company: Piccolo Films

Original release
- Network: Zee Marathi
- Release: 5 March 2012 – 14 July 2013

Unch Majha Zoka (transl. High my bow) is an Indian television series directed by Viren Pradhan and was aired on Zee Marathi. The series premiered on 5 March 2012 from Monday to Saturday at 8 pm by replacing Ekach Hya Janmi Janu.

== Summary ==
It is a dramatization of the story of how the child Yamuna was given at age 11 in an arranged marriage to Mahadev Govind Ranade and then proceeded to defy society's expectation to become the social activist Ramabai Ranade. It is set during the British Raj in 1870s India.

== Cast ==
=== Main ===
- Spruha Joshi as Ramabai Ranade, Mahadevrao's wife and Govindrao's daughter-in-law
  - Tejashree Walawalkar as maiden Yamuna Annasaheb Kurlekar and Young Ramabai Ranade
- Vikram Gaikwad as Mahadev Govind Ranade aka Madhavrao, Ramabai's husband, Govindrao's eldest son
- Sharad Ponkshe as Govindrao (Bhausaheb) Ranade, Mahadevrao, Durga Akka, Nilkantha (Aaba) and Shripad's (Baba) father, Ramabai's father-in-law, Gopikabai and Mai's husband
- Shailesh Datar as Annasaheb Kurlekar, Umabai's husband, Gopal, Daji, Keshav and Ramabai's father, Saraswatibai and Mahadevrao's father-in-law
- Kavita Lad as Umabai Annasaheb Kurlekar, Annasaheb's wife, Gopal, Daji, Keshav and Ramabai's mother, Saraswatibai and Mahadevrao's mother-in-law
- Rugvedi Pradhan as Mai Ranade, Govindrao's second wife, Ramabai's step mother-in-law, Mahadevrao and Durga Akka's step mother, Nilkantha (Aaba) and Shripad's (Baba) biological mother

=== Recurring ===
- Sharmishtha Raut as Tai Kaku, Mahadevrao's widowed paternal aunt
- Sanyogita Bhave as Subhadra Kaku, Vithal (Vithu Kaka) Ranade's wife, Mahadevrao' aunt
- Mitali Mayekar as Ahilyabai, Moru Mama's third wife
- Saurabh Gokhale as Gopal Annasaheb Kurlekar, Ramabai's eldest brother, Saraswatibai's husband
- Pournima Bhave Talwalkar as Gopikabai Govindrao Ranade, Mahadevrao and Durga Akka's biological mother; Govindrao's first wife
- Amol Bavdekar as Moru Mama, Ahilyabai's husband, Mahadevrao's step maternal uncle (Mama), Mai's brother
- Atul Kasva as Pandu Kaka, Ranades' househelper
- Shilpa Tulaskar as Rukminibai Joshi, Ramabai's maternal aunt (Maushi), Umabai's elder sister
- Neena Kulkarni as Aaji, Mai's mother, Govindrao's second mother-in-law
- Akshata Kulkarni Gaikwd as Kashibai Kanetkar
- Chaitrali Gupte as Annapoornabai Ramakrishna Bhandarkar, wife of R. G. Bhandarkar
- Nayana Apte Joshi as Sakhartai, Tai Kaku's mother
- Nilpari Gaikwad Khanwalkar as Durga Akka (Durgabai Vinayakrao Fadnavis), Mahadevrao's real sister, Govindrao and Gopikabai's daughter (widowed at an early age)
- Sushil Bhosale as Nilkantha (Aaba) Govindrao Ranade, Govindrao and Mai's first son, Mahadevrao's step-brother
- Chinmay Kulkarni as young Nilkantha (Aaba) Govindrao Ranade
- Amruta Konde as Lakshmi Nilkantha Ranade, Aaba's wife, Govindrao and Mai's second daughter-in-law
- Ashish Joshi as Shripad (Baba) Govindrao Ranade, Govindrao and Mai's second son, Mahadevrao's step-brother
- Aditya Ganu as young Shripad (Baba) Govindrao Ranade
- Deepti Laygude as Ganga Shripad Ranade, Baba's wife, Govindrao and Mai's third daughter-in-law
- Niranjan Kulkarni as Damodar Abhyankar, Bayo's second husband
- Nandita Dhuri Patkar as Girijabai Ketkar
- Amol Kolhe as Jyotirao Phule
- Suzanne Bernert as Miss Hertford
- Anil Gawas as Sakha Kaka, Ranade's househelp at Nashik
- Suruchi Adarkar as Muktabai Ranade Sathe (a widow guised as a married woman), Ranades' neighbour
- Akshaya Bhingarde as Saraswatibai Gopal Kurlekar, Gopal's wife, Ramabai's elder sister-in-law
- Madhavi Soman as Bhagirathibai, Annasaheb's widowed sister, Umabai's sister-in-law, Ramabai's paternal aunt(Aatya)
- Ujjwala Jog as Yashodabai Dandekar, Mahadevrao's first mother-in-law
- Dr. Sharad Bhutadiya as Vitthal Ranade (Vithu Kaka), Govindrao's Cousin, Subhadra Kaku's husband, Mahadevrao's uncle
- Mrunal Jadhav as Sakhu Duttatreya Moreshwar, Mahadevrao and Ramabai's neighbour in Nashik
- Swanand Joshi as Balambhatji Watve, Govindrao's friend, elderly person in Ranade household
- Devendra Dev as Kaka, Ramabai's elder paternal uncle, Annasaheb and Bhagirathibai's elder brother
- Hemangi Velankar as Kaku, Ramabai's elder paternal aunt, Kaka's wife
- Siddhesh Prabhakar as Gopal Krishna Gokhale
- Soham Bodas as young Keshav Annasaheb Kurlekar, Gopal, Daji and Ramabai's younger brother
- Atharva Gunjal as young Daji Annasaheb Kurlekar, Gopal, Keshav and Ramabai's younger brother
- Gururaj Avadhani as Haribhau Joshi, Rukminibai's father-in-law
- Girish Oak as Dr. Vishramraoji Ghole, Mahadevrao's doctor
- Jyoti Malshe as Bayo Moreshwar Abhyankar, widowed daughter of Vatsalabai and Madhavrao Moreshwar, remarried to Damodar Abhyankar
- Sanjivani Samel as Saraswatibai Ganeshrao Joshi, wife of Ganesh Vasudeo Joshi (Sarvajanik Kaka)
- Achyut Potdar as Dwarkanath Tarkhadkar
- Dr. Vilas Ujawane as Ganesh Vasudeo Joshi (Sarvajanik Kaka)
- Nandkumar Patil as Gopal Hari Deshmukh (Lokhitwadi)

== Production ==
The story is based in the late 19th century Maharashtra. The sets for the show, presenting the houses and interiors resembling that era are constructed at Film City, Goregaon. Erected on 30-50 thousand square feet area, the set is mainly designed per descriptions of Ranade Wada as written by Ramabai Ranade in her biography Majhya Aayushyatlya Aathvani. Santosh Futane has designed the sets based on these descriptions and then making them shooting-friendly. The makeup rooms also have the old look from outside but are equipped with modern facilities from inside. The Theatrical property of old utensils, lamps, machines have been collected from various cities including rural areas like Padgha, Wada and Mokhada.

=== Special episode ===
==== 1 hour ====
- 9 September 2012

==== 2 hours ====
- 14 July 2013 (Last episode)

== Awards ==
Zee Marathi Utsav Natyancha Awards 2012
Category	Recipients	Role
Best Series	Viren Pradhan	Viren Production
Best Family		Ranade Family
Best Father	Sharad Ponkshe	Govind
Best Mother	Rugvedi Pradhan	Maai
Best Character Male	Vikram Gaikwad	Mahadev Govind Ranade
Best Character Female	Tejashree Walawalkar	Ramabai
Best Supporting Male	Atul Kasva	Pandu
Best Supporting Female	Sanyogita Bhave	Subhadra
Best Title Song	Nilesh Moharir	Music Composer
