= Sharad Ponkshe =

Indian film actor and writer (born 1966)

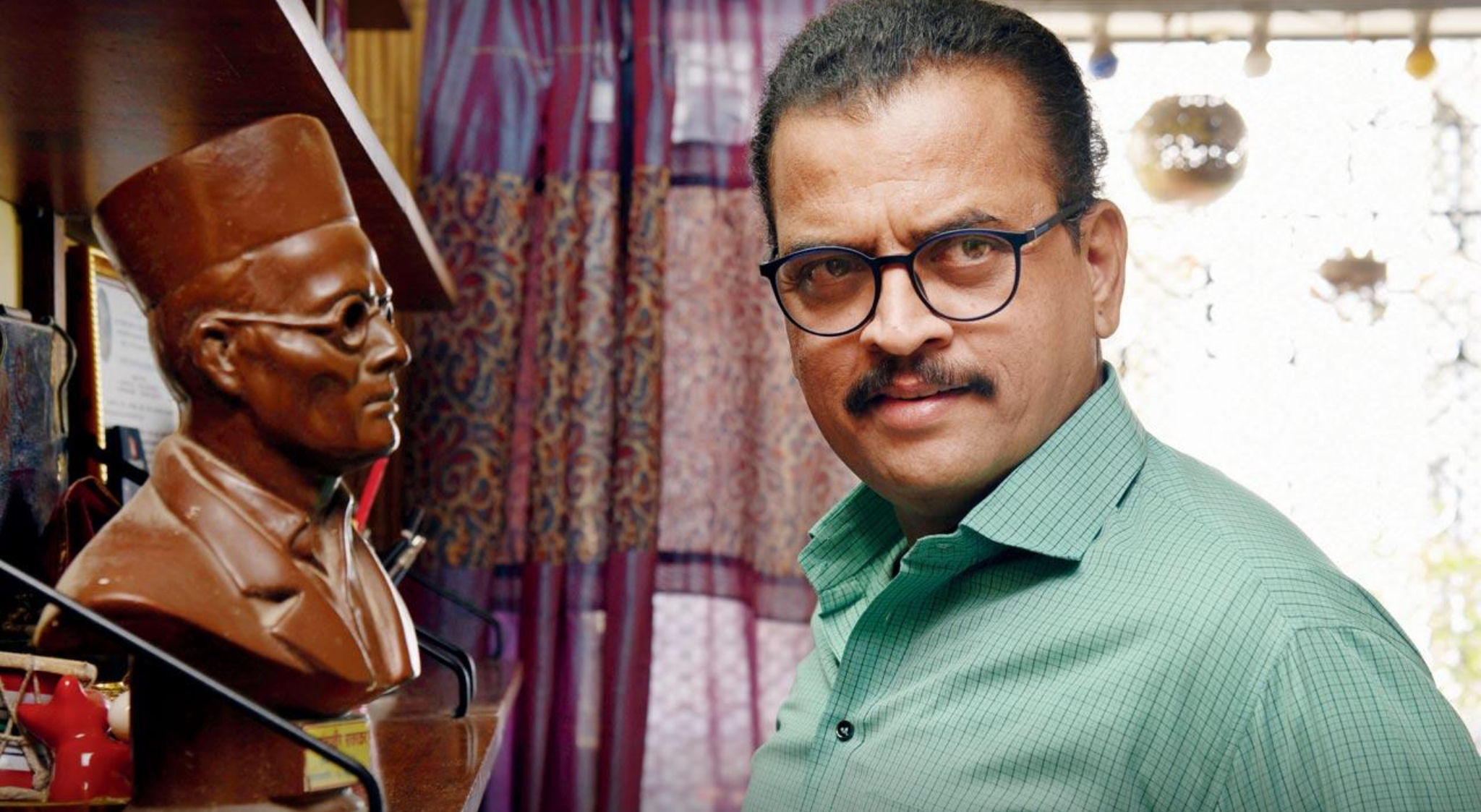
- Born: 13 October 1966 (age 59); India
- Occupations: Actor; writer; social worker; orator; activist
- Years active: 1988–present
- Political party: Shiv Sena
- Children: 2 (including Sneh Ponkshe)

Sharad Ponkshe (born 13 October 1966) is an Indian actor and writer, mainly working in Hindi and Marathi cinema. He is a speaker and an actor in Marathi film, theater and television.

== Career ==
Ponkshe started his career in 1988 and worked in multiple fields including Marathi stage, Marathi television and film industry. After his education in the college he immediately started his career in the Marathi film and television industry. He became very popular with the daily serial Damini on DD Sahyadri. He played a role with Pratiksha Lonkar in that serial. Both played many roles in plays and movies. The TV serial Agnihotra and Vadalvaat gave Ponkshe enormous popularity in Maharashtra. Later he played the role of Ranade's father in the TV serial Unch Majha Zoka, which was based on the life of Mahadev Govind Ranade and Ramabai Ranade.. He also played an important role in Zee Marathi serial Ase He Kanyadan.

Ponkshe played an important role in the play Me Nathuram Godse Boltoy, which was based on a very sensitive issue, the assassination of Mahatma Gandhi. His acting in this play started in 1988, starring as the main role of Nathuram Godse. He continues to get threats for playing Mahatma Gandhi's assassin Nathuram Godse. This was a key role in his life, performing it more than 1000 times and getting recognized by audience.

Overall he played more than 100 roles in television and films. He had a great respect to the actor and director Vinay Apte who gave him the role in the above play.

In 2021, he was seen in the Colors TV sitcom Bawara Dil. He played the role of Lalit Rao Lokhande in Sony SAB Sitcom Sajan Re Phir Jhooth Mat Bolo. He also plays the role of Vinayak Kanitkar aka Dada, in the Marathi serial Thipkyanchi Rangoli on Star Pravah.

== Personal life ==
Ponkshe is known for his pro-Savarkar stance and has orated about him all over the world. Ponkshe was diagnosed with cancer in December 2018 and underwent chemotherapy. He returned to the stage with the play Himalayachi Sawli in 2019.

== Filmography ==
All films/web-series are in Marathi, unless mentioned.

=== Films ===
Year	Film	Notes
2003	Antop Hill	
2004	Black Friday	
2007	Gadhvache Lagna	
2007	Bhulwa	
2008	Kshan Haa Mohacha	
2010	Jetaa	
2011	Tuch Khari Gharchi Laxmi	
2012	Mokala Shwaas	
	Tukaram	Bolhoba Ambile
2013	Angarki	
2014	Surajya	
2015	Black Home	
2015	What About Savarkar	
2015	Sandook	
2015	Calendar Girls	
2016	Well Done Bhalya	
2016	Vighnaharta Mahaganpati	
2016	Vrundavan	
2016	Doctor Rakhmabai	
2017	Bus Stop	
2017	Kanika	
2018	Me Shivaji Park	
2018	Radio Nights 6.06	
2019	Ek Nirnay... Swatahacha Swatasathi	
2019	Bandishala	
2019	Dank	
2021	Antim: The Final Truth	Hindi film
2022	Har Har Mahadev	
2023	Baipan Bhaari Deva	
2024	Hi Anokhi Gaath	
2024	Swargandharva Sudhir Phadke	
2024	Juna Furniture	
2025	Banjara	

On 15 January 2024, Film named "Rachana" was released on Ponkshe's YouTube channel, "Rashtray Swaha". He played the role of Avinash Katdare / Madhav Phadtare, a middle class person wanting to avenge his wife's accidental death. The film also showcases Rucha Apte's supporting but crucial role in it. The film is produced by Anita Tupe and Ponkshe himself. It is written and directed by Prasad Satvalekar.

=== Web series ===
Year	Series
2021	Baap Beep Baap

== Plays ==
- Himalayachi Sawali
- Me Nathuram Godse Boltoy
- Tya Tighanchi Gosht
- Ek Diwas Matha Kade
- Gandh Nishigandhacha
- Saraswati Tuzich
- Natasamrat
- Barister
- Asa Zalach Kasa
- Tichi Kahani
- Kabirache Kay Karayache
- Ramle Mi
- Sukhani Nanda
- Zale Mokle Aabhal
- Gandhi Ambedkar
- Varun Sagle Sarkhe
- Athang
- Tu Fakt Ho Mhan
- Kala Ya Laglya Jeeva
- Var Bhetu Naka
- Umbartha
- Baykocha Hun Kasa Karava
- Lahan Pan Dega Deva
- Tichi Kahani
- Beiman
- Bharat Bhagya Vidhata
- Nandi
- Eka Kshanat

== TV shows ==
- Shiva
- Agnihotra
- Kunku
- 24
- Vahinisaheb
- Ase He Kanyadan
- Aai Majhi Kalubai
- Thipkyanchi Rangoli
- Daar Ughad Baye
- Bawara Dil
- Unch Majha Zoka
- Sajan Re Phir Jhooth Mat Bolo
- Jai Malhar
- Durva
- Aabhalmaya
- Vadalvaat
- Bai Tuza Ashirvad
- Agnihotra 2
- Bandini
- Damini
- Mothi Tyachi Sawali
- Songati
- Ek Wada Zapatlela
- Jhoka
- Valan
- Dhakka
- Kalyani
- Aakash Peltana
- Indradhanushya
- Aadhunik Kunti
- Durga
- He Bandh Reshamache
- Mahashweta
- Ladha
- Chakravyuha
- Gharkul
- Aapli Manase
- Agnipariksha
- Ashakya
- Gajara
- Jhale Unhache Chandane
- Arth
- Akashjhep
- Manbhiman
- Ujwal Prabhat
- Tyachya Ya Gharat
- Vajwa Re Vajwa
- Aaradhana
- Jhanak
