= Mahipatram Rupram Nilkanth =

Gujarati educationist and biographer (1829–1891)

Rao Saheb Mahipatram Rupram Nilkanth CIE
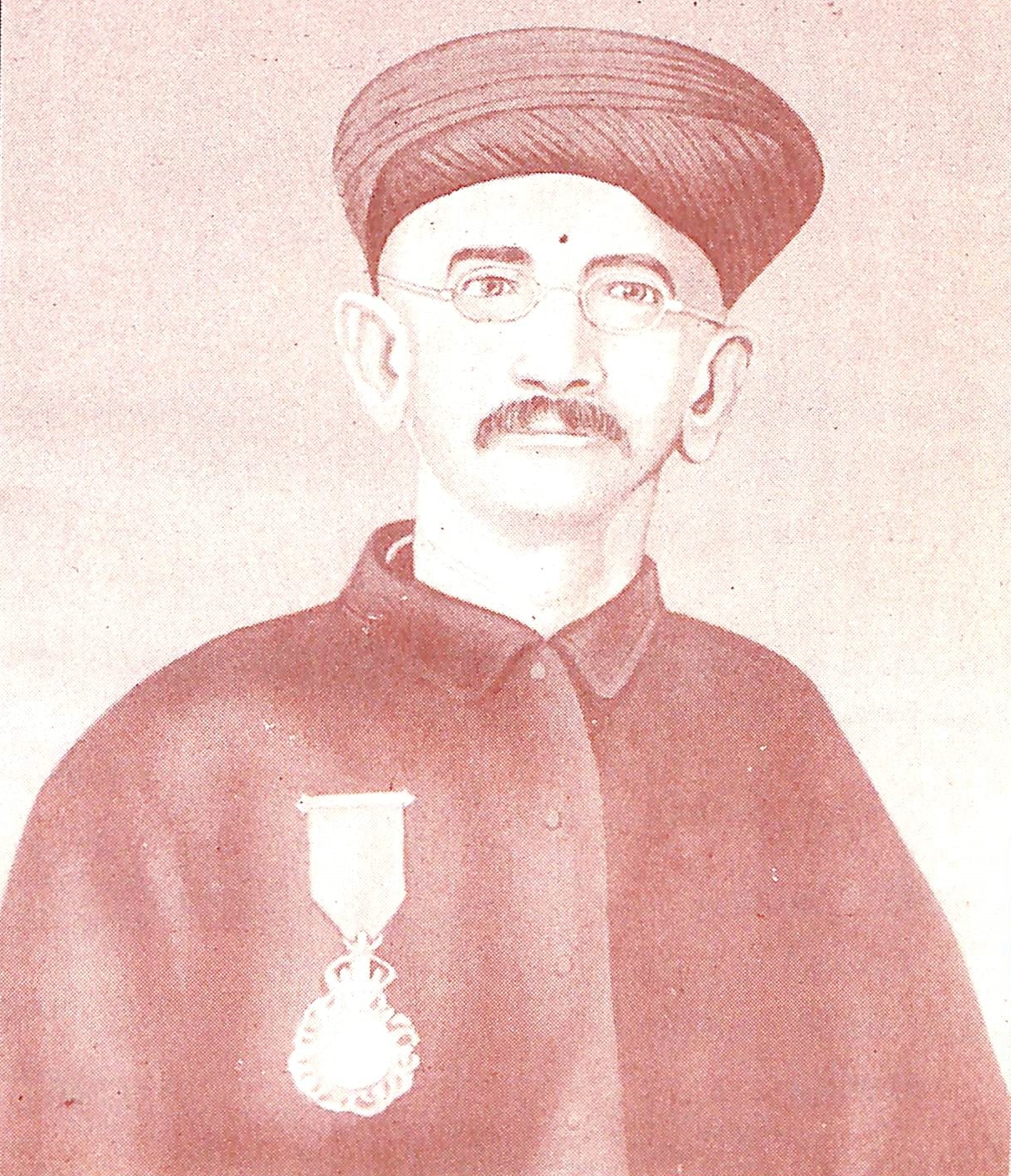
- Born: 3 December 1829; Surat, British India
- Died: 30 May 1891 (aged 61); Ahmedabad
- Occupations: Educationist, reformer, novelist and biographer
- Spouse: Parvatikunwar
- Children: Ramanbhai Nilkanth
- Relatives: Pico Iyer (great-great-great grandson)
- Writing career
- Language: Gujarati
- Notable work: Englandni Musafarinu Varnan (1862)
- Website: mahipatram.org

Mahipatram Rupram Nilkanth was a Gujarati educationist, reformer, novelist and biographer from 19th-century India.

== Life ==
He was born in Surat on 3 December 1829 to Vadnagara Nagar Brahmin family of Rupram Nilkanth and Girijagauri. He lost his mother when he was one and half years old. He was engaged, when four years old, to three years old girl Parvatikunwar. He completed elementary education of local 'village school' in Gopipura, Surat known as Pranshankar Mehtaji's school. Later he joined Government English school. During his school days, he was influenced by his teachers and reformers Durgaram Mehta and Dadoba Pandurang, brother of Atmaram Pandurang who founded Prarthana Samaj. He also attended weekly meetings of Manav Dharma Sabha run by them.

Later he joined his alma mater as an associated teacher in 1851. In 1852, he joined Highschool department of Elphinstone Institute, Bombay and was appointed an assistant teacher in 1854. He was closely associated with reformist organisations; Gyan Prasarak Sabha and Buddhivardhak Sabha in Bombay. He was later appointed an acting headmaster at the Ahmedabad High School in 1857 and later made a deputy education inspector there. In 1859, he was appointed a member of school textbooks committee, the textbooks known by T. C. Hope's name as Hope Series, and was sent to England on 27 March 1860 to experience training colleges by Education Department. After returning on 13 April 1861, he served as a principal of P. R. Training College in Ahmedabad until his retirement. He was excommunicated from community for twelve years by his Nagar Brahmin community for crossing the sea. He was not even allowed to perform last rites of his father. He had to seek compromise and went to several rituals to enter his community again.

He had edited Parhejdar magazine in 1850 and also edited educational monthly Gujarat Shala Patra (1862–78, 1887–91). He was an incharge of reformist weekly Satyaprakash for ten months in 1857. In 1885, he was awarded Rao Saheb and Companions of the Order of the Indian Empire (CIE) by the British government. He was associated with Ahmedabad Prarthana Samaj and Gujarat Vernacular Society as well several other organisations seeking social reforms like widow remarriage, prohibition of child marriage. He had also served as commissioner and chairman of Ahmedabad Municipality.

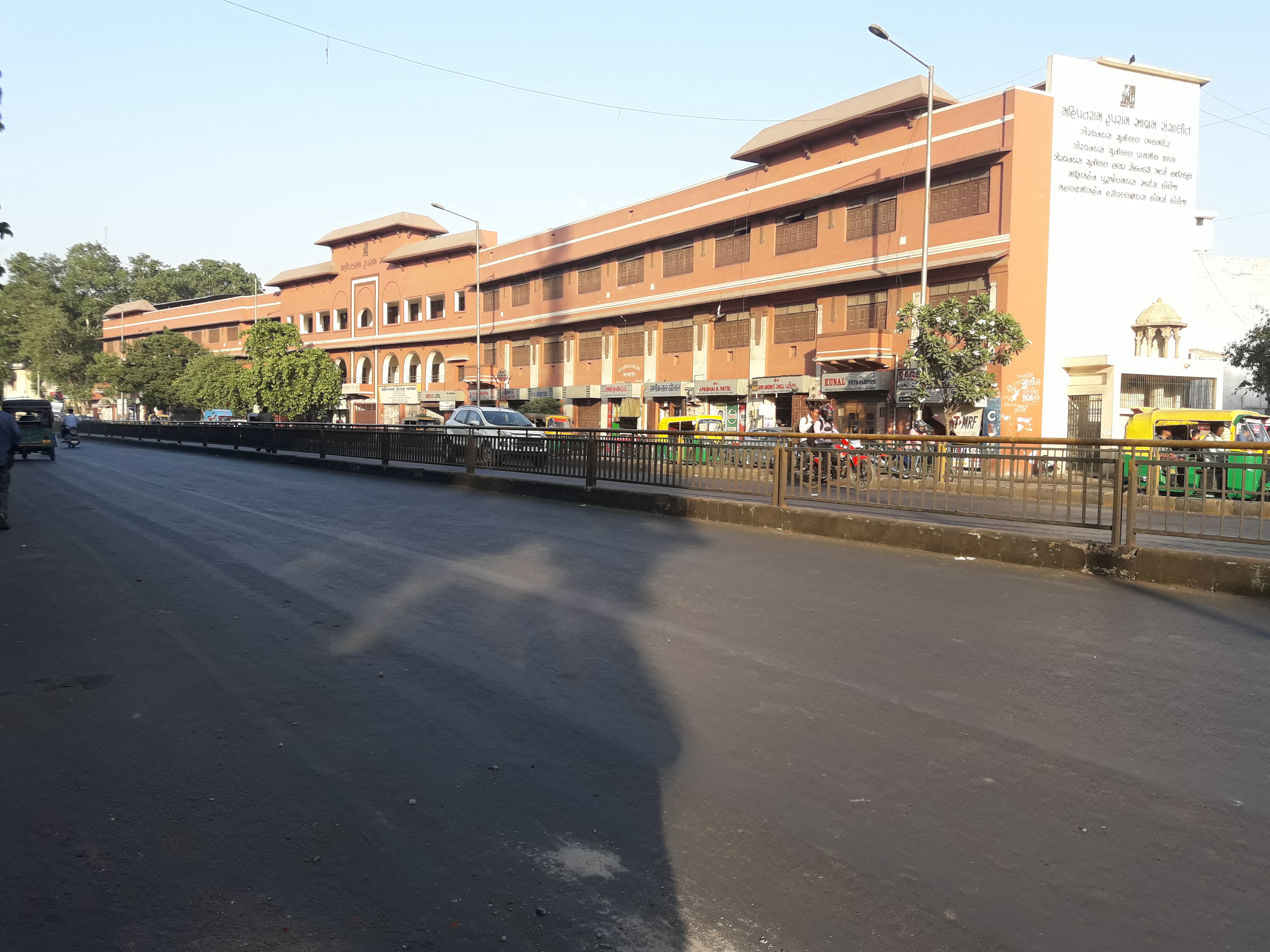
Mahipatram Rupram Ashram, founded in 1892 in Raipur area of Ahmedabad, is named after him

He died in Ahmedabad on 30 May 1891. His wife Parvatikunwar had supported and participated in his social reform activities. His son Ramanbhai Nilkanth was also writer and he also served as a mayor of Ahmedabad. An orphanage named Mahipatram Rupram Ashram was established on 17 December 1892 in Raipur, Ahmedabad in his memory which is now one of the largest and the oldest orphanages in India. British travel writer Pico Iyer is his great-great-grandson.

== Works ==
He wrote the first travelogue of Gujarati literature, Englandni Musafarinu Varnan (1862) in which he had described political, social, education condition of England then as well as descriptions of some popular places in England. Uttam Kapol Karsandas Mulji Charitra (1877) is a biography of his public figure and friend Karsandas Mulji. Mehtaji Durgaram Manchharam Charitra (1879) is a biography based on diary of Durgaram Mehta. Parvatikunwar Akhyan (1881, second edition) is biography of his wife. Akbarcharitra (1887, second edition) is his historical biography of Akbar which is mostly based on English translation of Akbarnama.

His initial, basic and historically important three novels of Gujarati literature are as follows: Sasuvahuni Ladai (1866) is about family life with mild humour which is considered as the first social novel in Gujarati. Sadhara Jesang (1880) and Vanraj Chavdo (1881) are basic historical novels on Jayasimha Siddharaja and Vanraj Chavda respectively. They are chiefly based on folklores and cultural history.

He collected and edited the first collection Veshas of folk theatre Bhavai as Bhavai Sangrah. He wrote his wish to reestablish Bhavai in its preface. He also published a collection of Garbis. He published Bodhvachan, a collection of sayings in poetic form.

From 1856 onward, he wrote booklets on life-sketches of Columbus, Galileo Galilei, Isaac Newton etc. He also translated work of Chamber with Nanabhai Haridas. He also wrote school textbooks; Gujarati Bhashanu Navu Vyakaran (New Grammar of Gujarati language, 1883) and Vyutpattiprakash (1889). He had also written books on education, geography, geology, science, medicine which were mostly translated works for students.
