= Ganesh Vasudeo Joshi =

British Indian lawyer, social reformer and activist (1828-1880)

Ganesh Vasudev Joshi
- Born: 9 April 1828
- Died: 25 July 1880 (aged 52)
- Other name: Sarwajanik Kaka
- Citizenship: British Indian
- Occupations: Lawyer, political activist, social worker
- Era: 19th century
- Organization: Poona Sarvajanik Sabha
- Movement: Indian Independence Movement
- Relatives: Gopal Krishna Gokhale (son-in-law)

Ganesh Vasudeo Joshi (9 April 1828 – 25 July 1880), popularly known as Sarwajanik Kaka, was a lawyer, social reformer, and political activist. He was a founding member of Poona Sarvajanik Sabha. He was a great support system for the noble works initiated and carried out successfully by Honorable Justice Mahadev Govind Ranade. He was a social activist in Pune when Maharashtrian revival began, and he was the elderly guiding philosopher when Tilak and Agarkar's generation gave impetus to Indian independence struggle. Joshi also represented Vasudev Balwant Phadke as his lawyer in Phadke's trial.

Joshi had a daughter who was married to Gopal Krishna Gokhale.

At the Delhi Durbar of 1877, wearing "homespun spotless white khadi" Joshi rose to ask of the Viceroy of India (then the 1st Earl of Lytton), that Her Majesty the Queen might:

Grant to India the same political and social status as is enjoyed by her British subjects.

Joshi died on 25 July 1880 due to heart trouble.
