= N. G. Chandavarkar =

Indian politician and reformer

Sir Narayan Chandavarkar
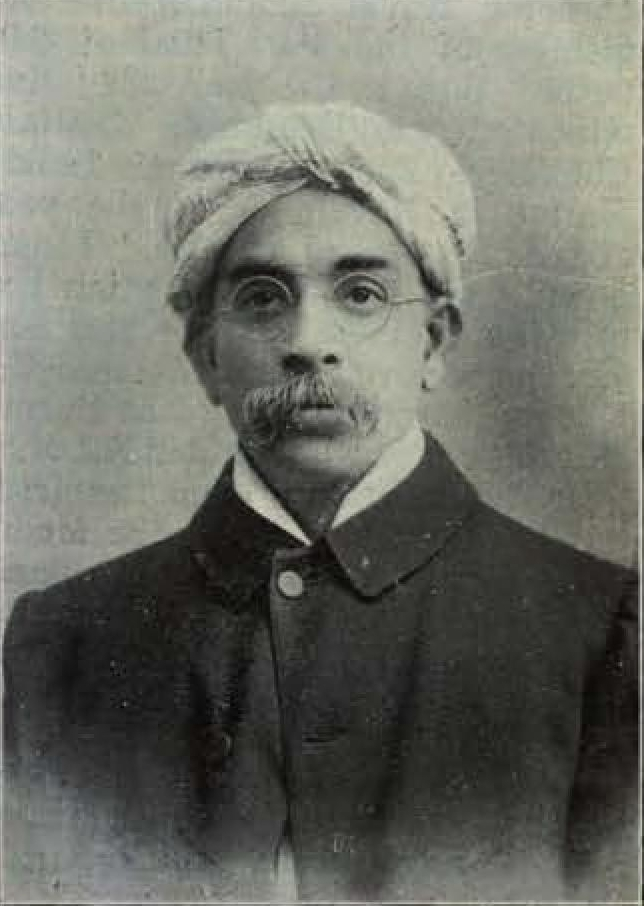

Vice Chancellor of University of Mumbai
- In office 1911 - 1912
- Preceded by: Ramkrishna Gopal Bhandarkar
- Succeeded by: John Heaton

President of the Indian National Congress
- In office 1900 - 1901
- Preceded by: Romesh Chunder Dutt
- Succeeded by: Dinshaw Edulji Wacha

Personal details
- Born: Narayan Ganesh Chandavarkar; 2 December 1855 Honnavar, British Raj (Now in Karnataka)
- Died: 4 May 1923 (aged 68)
- Party: Indian National Congress
- Education: Elphinstone College
- Occupation: Politician, Lawyer, Academic
- Awards: Knight Bachelor (1910)

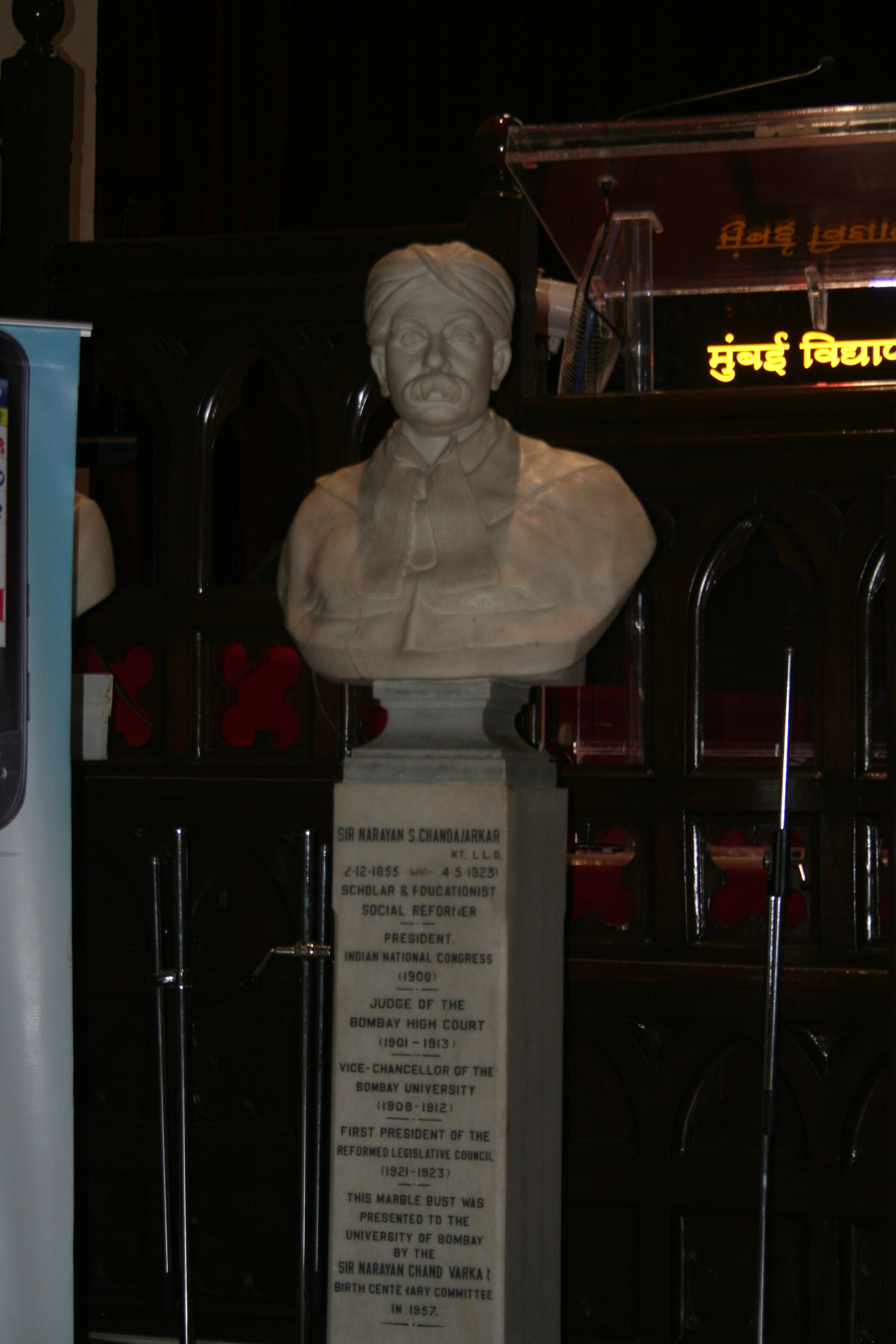
Statue of Sir N. G. Chandavarkar at the Convocation Hall, University of Mumbai.

Sir Narayan Ganesh Chandavarkar (2 December 1855 – 4 May 1923) was an early Indian National Congress politician and Hindu reformer.

== Early life ==
Narayan Ganesh Chandavarkar was born in British colonial India on 2 December in Honavar in the Bombay Presidency. His maternal uncle was Shamrao Vithal Kaikini, another notable reformer from the Chitrapur Saraswat Brahmin community. He served as a Dakshina Fellow in Elphinstone College for some time before earning a law degree in 1881. Shortly before the Indian National Congress was founded in 1885, N. G. Chandavarkar went to England as a member of the three-man delegation. The group was sent to educate public opinion about India right before general elections took place in England. G.L. Chandavarkar writes

His visit to England in 1885 carved out for Chandavarkar a political career, and he threw himself whole-heartedly into the work of the Indian National Congress which was founded in Bombay in 1885 on December 28, the day on which he and the other delegates returned to India.

== Career ==
He was the vice chancellor of the university of Bombay. He was elected the president of the annual session of the Indian National Congress in 1900 and one year later he was promoted to the high bench at the Bombay High Court. He took a break from politics for the next twelve years and devoted his time to the judicial system and various social groups till 1913. The main social group he worked with was the Prarthana Samaj ("Prayer Society"). He took the leadership reins from Mahadev Govind Ranade after the death of the latter in 1901. The organization was inspired by the Brahmo Samaj and was involved in the modernization of Hindu society. In 1910 as one of the member of Judges, he pronounced Rigorous Imprisonment 2 terms of 25 years each to Freedom Fighter Vinayak Damodar Savarkar . Chandavarkar was knighted in the 1910 New Year Honours List.

== Return to politics ==
He returned to the realm of Indian politics in 1914. A schism in the Congress in 1918 came to separate the organization into two camps. Chandavarkar became the head of the All-India Moderates Conference in 1918 along with Surendranath Banerjea and Dinshaw Wacha. In 1920 "he presided over the public meeting held in Bombay to protest against the report of the Hunter Committee on the Jallianwala Bagh atrocities which was appointed by the Government of India." Mahatma Gandhi was inspired by this to move a resolution on the topic.

== Notable quotes ==
- Noting the general trend of Hindu reform movements in the early twentieth century he remarked

The ideas that lie at the heart of the gospel of Krishna are slowly but surely permeating every part of Hindu society.
