= Rebecca Reuben Nowgaokar =

Jewish Indian Pedagogue writer

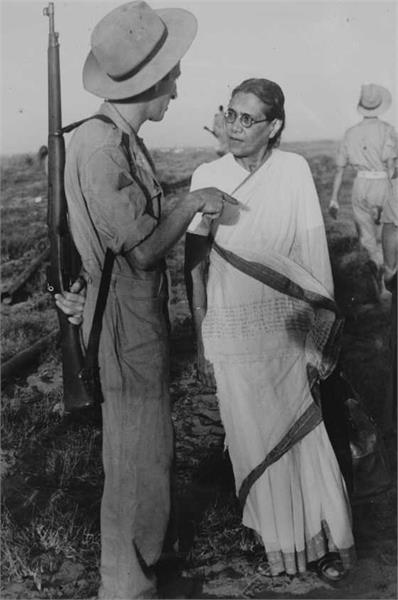
- Nowgaokar in Palestine in 1947
- Born: 18 September 1889; Shimoga, Karnataka, India
- Died: 16 November 1957 (aged 68); Bombay, Maharashtra, India
- Occupations: Writer, Educator
- Known for: Pedagogy

Rebecca Reuben Nowgaokar (18 September 1889 – 16 November 1957) was a Jewish-Indian writer and educator. She was the director of the School Committee of the Bene Israel in Mumbai from 1922 to 1950.

== Early life and family ==
She was born in Shimoga in the state of Karnataka in British India in 1889, into a family that led a congregation of Bene Israel. Her paternal grandfather, Rubenji Suri Nowgaoker, was a Marathi poet in the early 19th century. Her maternal grandfather, Avraham Samuel Nagavekar (born 1843), was an engineer and one of the first academics from the Bene Israel community and his father, Major Samuel Moses Nagavekar (1816-1904) was a senior officer who participated in the major campaigns in the Indian Revolt. Most of the family members followed their footsteps and became freelancers. Her father, Ezra, was a lawyer and later a judge known for his toughness, and her mother was one of the first women to graduate from the community.

== Education ==
She attended the local girls' boarding school in the city of Pune, which conducted classes in three languages: Marathi, Sanskrit and English. During the school holidays she learned Hebrew from her father. In 1905, she completed her high school education, becoming the first woman to receive the highest score on the entrance exams to Mumbai University. She also won an award for her excellence in science, but chose to pursue her career in education. In Mumbai, she studied history and went on to study Hebrew, after which she went to study in England and studied pedagogy at the University of London and Hebrew and Jewish Studies in Cambridge University under Prof. Israel Abrahams.

== Work ==
Upon her return to India in 1913, she taught in a number of general schools, including the boarding school at Pune where she attended in her youth, Huzurpaga. In 1920, she was appointed principal of a teacher training college in the Indian city of Baroda. She retired from this position with the desire to return and contribute to her community, and from 1922 to 1950, she served as the principal of the Bene Israel High School in Mumbai, where about 600 students studied. The school changed its name in the early 1920s, and was renamed after the Jewish philanthropist Sir Elly Kadoorie High School , after in a meeting between him and Reuben in London. She managed to persuade him to donate a sum of about 150,000 rupees to the school. During her tenure as the principal of the Community High School, she became one of the leaders of the Bene Israel community, served in public positions and committees of the Government of India dealing with education in West India, and engaged in pedagogy, literature and research. Her status in the community exceeded that of a school principal and she actually served as an unofficial leader of the community.

While teaching at Huzurpaga, Reuben started the magazine Balikardash. Reuben has authored a series of English language textbooks called Ashok which have been very successful in India and have been used in schools across the Maharashtra state . It was initiated by the publication of monthly educational called Nofet (Hebrew: נופת meaning innocence) for Jewish children, and during 1917–1920, edited the Bene Israel Year Book. She has published scholarly papers on the Commission "Children of Israel" in Hebrew and English on various platforms, including a booklet on community in Mumbai, published by Cambridge University Press in 1913. Rubin also dealt fiction and connected short stories and published newspaper that several translations to Hebrew Of stories from Indian folk literature.

In 1947, she visited Eretz Israel on a mission from the Mumbai Zionist Association and represented Indian Jews at the first international conference "Hebrew Education in the Diaspora" held that year in Jerusalem. On visiting Israel she said

"my eyes have seen the majesty of the Creator [...] wasteland resuscitated, this is yet another ancient language by all and many of them babies on the street to say this [...] to the prominent position nurses work hand in hand with men in all the areas of Building the country."(English translation)

The views of the Zionist combined with her passion to Israel in her native India was reflected in her later works, and was operated in parallel deepening Jewish identity of students and strengthen their ties to India and Indian society. She remained in India after most of the Bene Israel community returned to Israel, and continued educational activities and public service in the country until her death in Mumbai in 1957.

== Books ==
- Reuben, Rebecca (1913). The Bene Israel of Bombay (4 ed.). Cambridge: Cambridge University Press (Cambridge Jewish Publications).
