= Servants of India Society =

Society formed in 1905 in India

- Formation: June 12, 1905; 120 years ago
- Founder: Gopal Krishna Gokhale
- Type: Service club
- Headquarters: Pune, India
- Location: Pan-India
- Publication: The Hitavada
- Website: www.servantsofindia.in

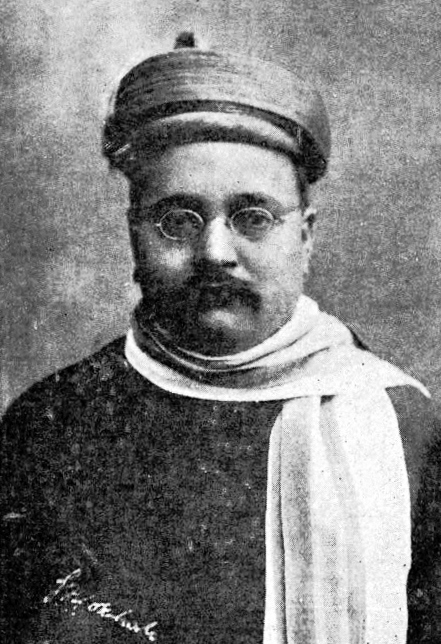
Gopal Krishna Gokhale

The Servants of India Society is a social reform organisation that was formed in Pune, Maharashtra, on June 12, 1905 by Gopal Krishna Gokhale, to harness the youth to patriotic service. He left the Deccan Education Society to form this association. Along with him were a small group of educated Indians, as Natesh Appaji Dravid, Gopal Krishna Deodhar, Surendra Nath Banerjee, and Anant Patwardhan who wanted to promote social and human development and overthrow the British rule in India.

The Society was established on the conviction that true liberation of the masses could only be achieved through the committed efforts of a group of selfless, dedicated, and intelligent individuals who would devote their lives to the service of the nation and the upliftment of its most vulnerable communities. The Society’s volunteers were trained to serve as nationalist missionaries, taking vows of renunciation and forsaking all notions of selfishness, pride, and personal recognition. With a deep sense of duty, they committed themselves fully to their work and the service of the nation. The Society emphasized holistic nation-building through initiatives in education, social welfare, and the upliftment of marginalized and underprivileged communities. Its mission extended beyond economic and political realms, encompassing a broad spectrum of social issues aimed at fostering inclusive and sustainable progress.

The Society organized many campaigns to promote education, sanitation, health care, and fight the social evils of untouchability and discrimination, alcoholism, poverty, oppression of women and for protection of women from domestic abuse.

The society is regarded as the first secular organization in the country dedicated to serving the underprivileged, rural and tribal communities, along with other social causes.

The Society began publishing The Hitavada, its English-language journal from Nagpur, in 1911.

In 1930, the society established the Gokhale Institute of Politics and Economics, Pune.

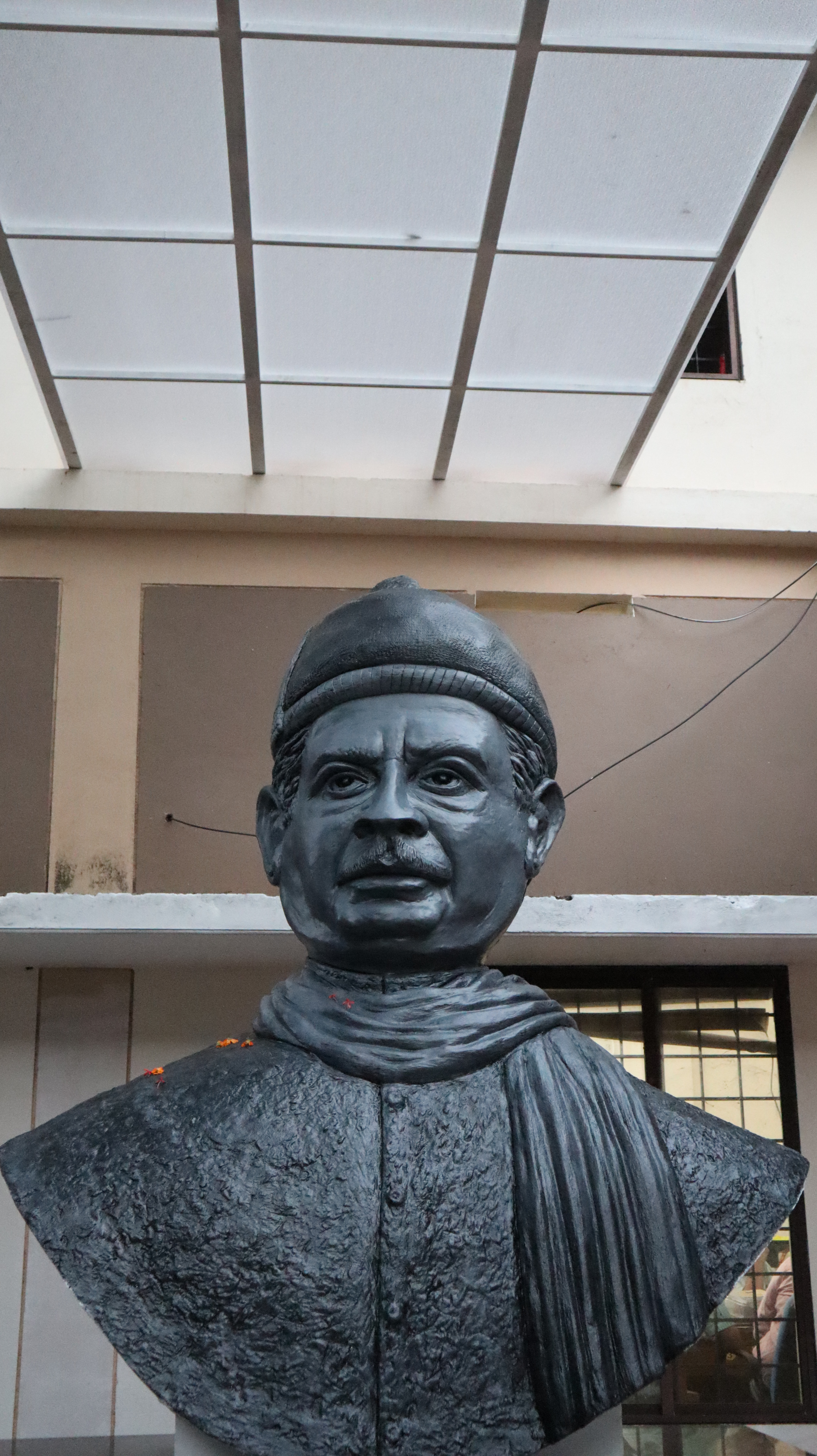
Statue of Gopal Krishna Devadhar at Devadhar Government Higher Secondary School Campus, Near Tanur, Kerala

Prominent Indians were its members and leaders. It chose to remain away from political activities and organizations like the Indian National Congress.

It still continues its activities albeit with a small membership. It has its H.Q. in the city of Pune, Maharashtra. It has its branches in various other states like Uttar Pradesh, Odisha and Uttarakhand. It has its branch office at Allahabad, U.P.

In Odisha, it has its centres at Cuttak, Choudwar and Rayagada. It runs an orphanage in Odisha.
