= Madras Mahajana Sabha =

Nationalist organisation in British India

Madras Mahajana Sabha was an Indian nationalist organisation based in the Madras Presidency. Along with the Poona Sarvajanik Sabha, Bombay Presidency Association and the Indian Association, it is considered to be a predecessor of the Indian National Congress. Madras Mahajana Sabha was formed in 1884.
