= Ramabai Ranade =

Indian social worker and activist

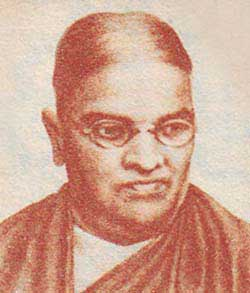
- Born: Yamuna Kurlekar; 25 January 1862; Devarashtre, Bombay Presidency, British India (present-day Sangli, Maharashtra, India)
- Died: 25 January 1924 (aged 62); Seva Sadan, Pune
- Known for: Women's education and self-reliance
- Spouse: Mahadev Govind Ranade

Ramabai Ranade (25 January 1862 – 26 April 1924) was an Indian social worker and one of the first women's rights activists in the early 20th century. At the age of 11, she was married to Justice Mahadev Govind Ranade, who was a distinguished Indian scholar and social reformer.

Ramabai, soon after her marriage, started to learn reading and writing with strong support and encouragement from Mahadev Govind Ranade. Starting with her native language Marathi, she strove hard to master English. In 1884, Ramabai with her husband and other colleagues established country's one of the first girls' high school Huzurpaga, in Pune.

Inspired by her husband, Ramabai started 'Hindu Ladies Social Club' in Mumbai to develop public speaking among women. After the death of her husband, Ramabai devoted the rest of her life to the betterment of women's lives mainly through the activities 'Seva Sadan Society' in Mumbai and Pune.

She was the founder and president of the Poona "Seva Sadan", which is the most successful of all Indian women's institution and is attended by thousands of women. The immense popularity of the institution was due to the fact that it was under Ramabai's close personal supervision.

== Early life and background ==
Ramabai Ranade was born on 25 January 1862, as Yamuna Kurlekar in Kurlekar family, living in a small village, Devrashtre of Sangli District, Maharashtra. As educating girls was a taboo in those days, her father did not educate her. In 1873, at the age of 11, she was married to Justice Mahadev Govind Ranade, a widower who was twenty years older than her, and a pioneer of India's social reform movement. He devoted his time to educate her in face of opposition of the women in the house and helped her to become a worthy helpmate in social and educational reform. With his strong support and sharing his visionary path, Ramabai spent all her life making women self-reliant and economically independent. Her husband was a graduate of Bombay University with first class honours. He not only worked as the Professor of English and Economics at the Elphinstone College in Bombay, but was also as an oriental translator and a social reformer. He rigorously worked against evils that existed in the society. He was against untouchability, child marriage (but caved-in to his family's wishes by marrying a child himself). He took over the Sarvajanik Sabha and led a number of movements for social development. He had won the praise of the whole of Maharashtra by the time he was in his early thirties. His overarching thinking, dynamic vision, passionate and devoted social commitment strongly inspired Ramabai and illuminated her path for future social work.

Ramabai made it a mission to educate herself, so that she could be an equal partner in the active life led by her husband. In her efforts she faced obstruction and hostility from other women in her extended family. Justice Ranade gave regular lessons to young Ramabai in writing and reading Marathi, History, Geography, Mathematics, and English. He used to make her read all newspapers and discuss current affairs with him. She became his devoted disciple and slowly became his secretary and his trusted friend. When Pandita Ramabai came to Pune in 1882 after becoming a widow, the Ranades helped her. Both, Ramabai Ranade and Pandita Ramabai took English language lessons from a Christian missionary lady at the Ranade residence.

== Career ==
Ramabai made her first public appearance at Nashik High School as the Chief Guest. Justice Ranade wrote her maiden speech. She soon mastered the art of public speaking, both in English and Marathi. Her speeches were always simple and heart-touching. She began working for Prarthana Samaj in Bombay. She established a branch of Arya Mahila Samaj (Arya women's society) in the city. From 1893 to 1901, Ramabai was at the peak of her popularity in her social activities. She established the Hindu Ladies Social and Literary Club in Bombay and started a number of classes to train women in languages, general knowledge, tailoring and handwork.

=== Social activism after the death of Justice Ranade ===
Ramabai started her public service around 1878, but it was after Justice Ranade's death in 1901 that she wholly identified herself with the cause of women in India.She lived for 23 years after her husband's death – a life full of activity for social awakening, redressal of grievances and established social institutions like Seva Sadan for rehabilitation of distressed women.Upon her husbands's death, she left Bombay and came to Pune and stayed at their old ancestral house near Phule Market. For one year, she led a secluded life. Finally, she came out of her self-imposed isolation. At that time at the urging of Ramakrishna Gopal Bhandarkar and Mr. Bhajekar, she chaired the first session of Bharat Mahila Parishad (India Women Conference) held in Bombay in 1904. She became a regular visitor to the Central Prison, especially the women's wing, to kindle self-esteem amongst prison inmates. She paid her visit to boys in reformatory school, spoke to them and distributed sweets to them on festive occasions. She regularly visited patients in local hospitals, distributing fruits, flowers, and books. She also went out to Gujarat and Kathiawar in 1913 to organise relief for famine-stricken people. Even in the final years of her life, she went to Alandi at the time of Ashadhi and Kartiki fairs, with volunteers from the Seva Sadan, to render help to women pilgrims visiting the shrine of Sant Dnyaneshwar. In taking up this activity, she laid foundations for a new type of social service for women.

In 1920 at the height of Non-cooperation movement led by Mahatma Gandhi, Ramabai even learned how to run a cotton spinning charkha.

=== Seva Sadan ===
In 1908, Parsee social reformer B. M. Malbari and Dayaram Gidumal came up with the idea of founding home for women and training Indian women to be nurses. They then turned to Ramabai, for her guidance and help for starting a Society and thus Seva Sadan (Bombay) came into being. In 1909, the Pune Seva Sadan was started and later in 1915 it was registered. In 1915 the Pune Seva Sadan was registered as a society under her guidance. The society expanded its old educational departments and also started new ones. It developed a Women's Training College, three hostels, one of them for Medical students and other for probationer nurses.

In 1924, after Ramabai died on her 62nd birthday, the Pune Seva Sadan was training more than one thousand women in different departments. It was largely owing to Ramabai's initiatives, guidance, and exertions that Seva Sadan found a footing and grew so rapidly in spite of prevailing prejudices. The last two outstanding contribution which she made were – the organisation of agitation for extending compulsory and pre-primary education to girls; and secondly organisation of Women's Suffrage Movement in Bombay Presidency in 1921–22. The singular position, which she assumed at the end of her life deserved Mahatma Gandhi's tribute to her as quoted: "The death of Ramabai Ranade is a great national loss. She was the embodiment of all that a Hindu widow could be. She was a true friend and helpmate of her illustrious husband in his lifetime."

"After his death she chose her husband's reform activities as her life's aim. Justice Ranade was a reformer and deeply concerned about the uplifting of Indian womanhood. Ramabai put her heart and soul into Seva Sadan. She devoted her whole energy to it. The result is that Seva Sadan has become an institution with no second of its kind throughout India."

In the early years of Seva Sadan, most of the nursing students were widows. Once there was an occasion of the annual social gathering of Seva Sadan. One of the highlights of the function was the prize distribution ceremony. Among the prize winners was a widow. She was dressed in the traditional dress of the widows of those days, a simple dark red sari with the Pallu tightly drawn over her clean-shaven head. As the widow stepped on the stage, the student crowding the galleries started hooting and shouting. This outburst of misbehavior hurt Ramabai's feelings deeply. As she stood upon the stage towards the end of the function to give a brief thanksgiving speech, she was so provoked that she could not help chastising the student crowd with all the severity at her command: "You are college students and yet how can you be regarded as educated? How can those be considered as educated who not only do not extend sympathy to their unfortunate sisters who have fallen victims to cruel fate and merciless social customs, but find it fit to heap ridicule on them. Every one of you probably has some unfortunate widow sheltered under your roof, may be your sister, cousin or aunt or even your own mother. If you had kept this in mind you would not have misbehaved the way you did." These were sharp, stinging words striking the students like a whiplash. There was pin drop silence. It was a triumph of Ramabai's powerful and spellbinding personality. She worked relentlessly against the system of child marriage. All these efforts took shape in establishing the Seva Sadan Society in Bombay, which substituted as a home for a number of distressed women. She started Pune Seva Sadan Society in her own ancestral house. This later developed into an institution offering a number of facilities like hostels, training colleges, vocational centres, selling centres, etc. Ramabai's name became synonymous with Seva Sadan. This was her greatest contribution to the welfare of middle-class women. Ramabai participated in the War Conference and spoke to the Governor on behalf of Indian women. She also fought for the cause of Indian labour in Fiji and Kenya. She even worked for women's right to franchise. Everyone adored her, but she was modest to call herself a shadow of her husband.

== In popular culture ==
In her honour, the Indo-Australian Post issued a Postage stamp picturing Ramabai on 14 August 1962, in her birth centenary year for her great contribution towards the Indian society.

A television series on Zee Marathi named Unch Majha Zoka (roughly translated as 'My Swing Flies High', with an implication of dreaming big in life and striving for it) based on Ramabai's life and her development as a 'women's rights' activist was telecasted in March 2012. This series was critically acclaimed and celebrated throughout Maharashtra. It had actors Vikram Gaikwad as Mahadev Govind Ranade and Spruha Joshi as Ramabai Ranade.

== Legacy ==
- Ramabai's important literary contribution is her autobiography Amachya Ayushyatil Kahi Athavani in Marathi in which she gives a detailed account of her married life. She also published a collection of Justice Ranade's lectures.
- Seva Sadan
