= Paramahansa Mandali =

Secret religious group

Paramahansa Mandali was a secret socio-religious group, established in 1849, in Bombay and is closely related to Manav Dharma Sabha which was found in 1844 in Surat. It was started by Durgaram Mehtaji, Dadoba Pandurang and a group of his friends. Dadoba Pandurang assumed leadership of this organisation after he left Manav Dharma Sabha. He outlined his principles in Dharma Vivechan in 1848 for Manav Dharma Sabha and "Paramhansik Bramhyadharma" for Paramahansa Mandali. It acted as a secret society and is believed that the revelation of its existence in 1860 hastened its demise.

It was the first socio-religious organisation of Maharashtra, founded in 1849. Its founders of these Mandli believed in one God. They were primarily interested in breaking caste rules. At their meetings food cooked by lower caste people was taken by the members. The Mandali also advocated women's education and widow remarriage.

== See also ==
- Secret society
