= Huzurpaga =

Girls' high school in India

Coordinates: 18.5148°N 73.8528°E

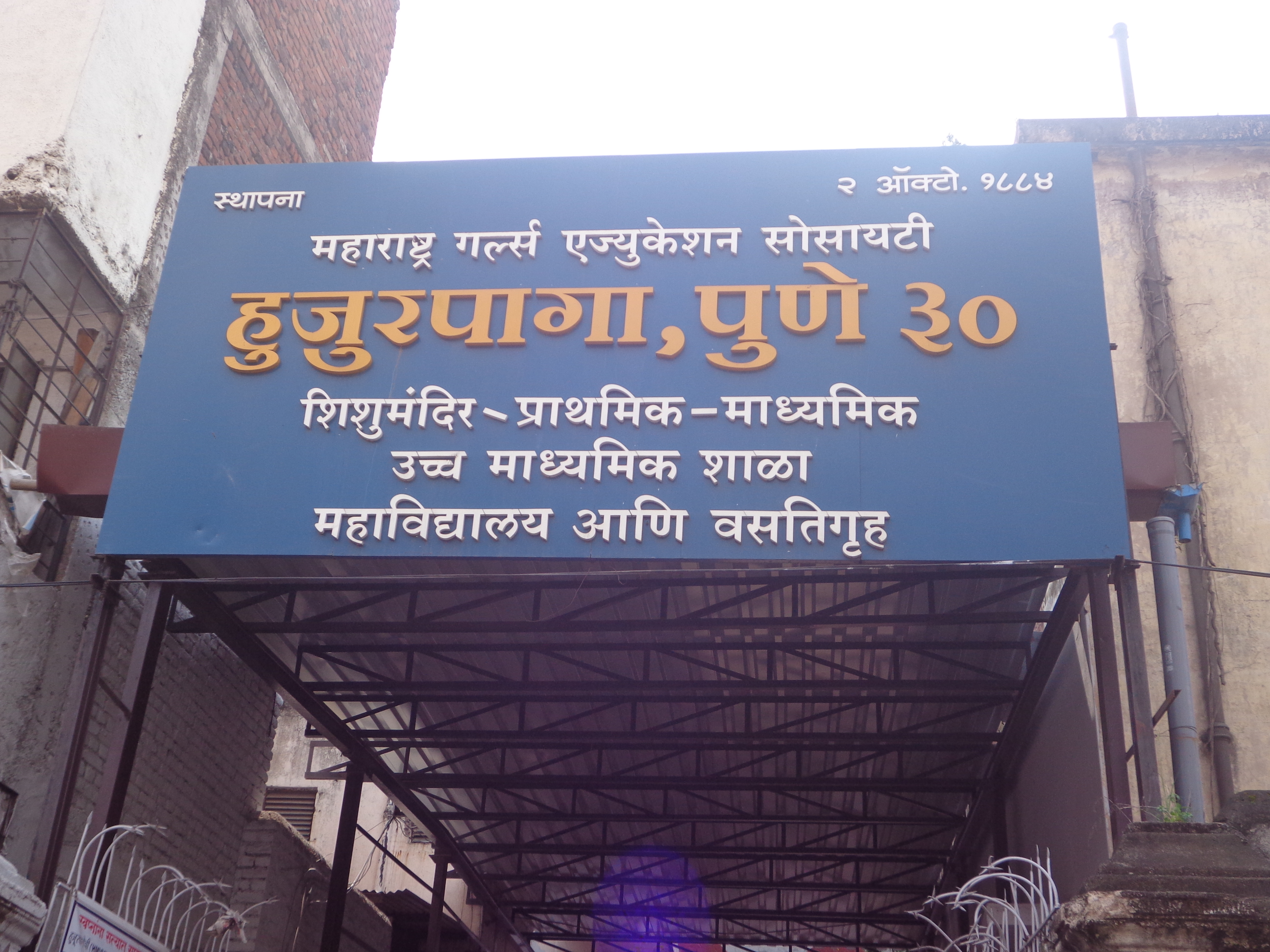
Huzurpaga Campus

Huzurpaga is the oldest Indian run girls' high school in India.

== History ==
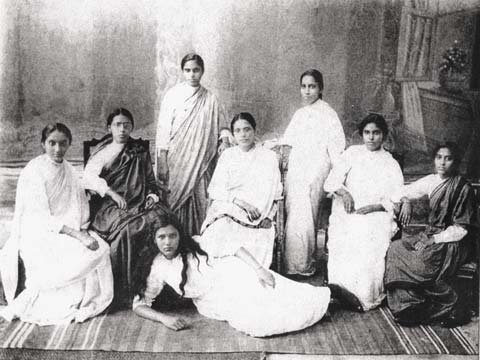
Bene Israel Students of Huzurpaga from early 20th century

The school was established by the Maharashtra Girls Education Society (MGE) in 1885. The school's founders included noted social reformers Vaman Abaji Modak, Justice Ranade and historian Dr. R. G. Bhandarkar. Ranade's then young wife, Ramabai Ranade had presented a petition to the governor of Bombay, James Ferguson in 1884 about the desirability of opening a high school for girls. Ferguson inaugurated the school in 1885. The school was originally called the Poona Native Girls High School (PNHS). It was the first Indian-run school to offer education to girls to the level of matriculation. The school started with twelve girls, two of them widows. Mary Sorabji, sister of social reformer, Cornelia Sorabji was one of the first teachers. The subjects taught included those required to appear for the matriculation examination such as English literature, arithmetics, geometry, Marathi, and science. Sanskrit was an optional language on the syllabus. The establishment of the school and its curriculum were vehemently opposed by Lokmanya Tilak in his newspapers, the Mahratta and Kesari. A play disparaging the English language curriculum went to second edition. The play also on ran on stage in Pune for many performances. In 1887, the ruler of the Princely state of Sangli, Tatyasaheb Patwardhan, offered land on Laxmi Road in Pune, where the high school is based. The girls' hostel and the elementary school were established later on the same campus.

The school has offered a boarding option for out-of-town students for more than a century. The school and the boarding option were popular among the Bene Israel community in the early part of the 20th century. Notable boarders of school include Anandibai Karve and actress Reema Lagu.

In the 1990s, MGE started a new branch of the school in the Pune suburb of Katraj. It started with a preschool and gradually extended to include high school and higher secondary school, respectively.

== Academics ==
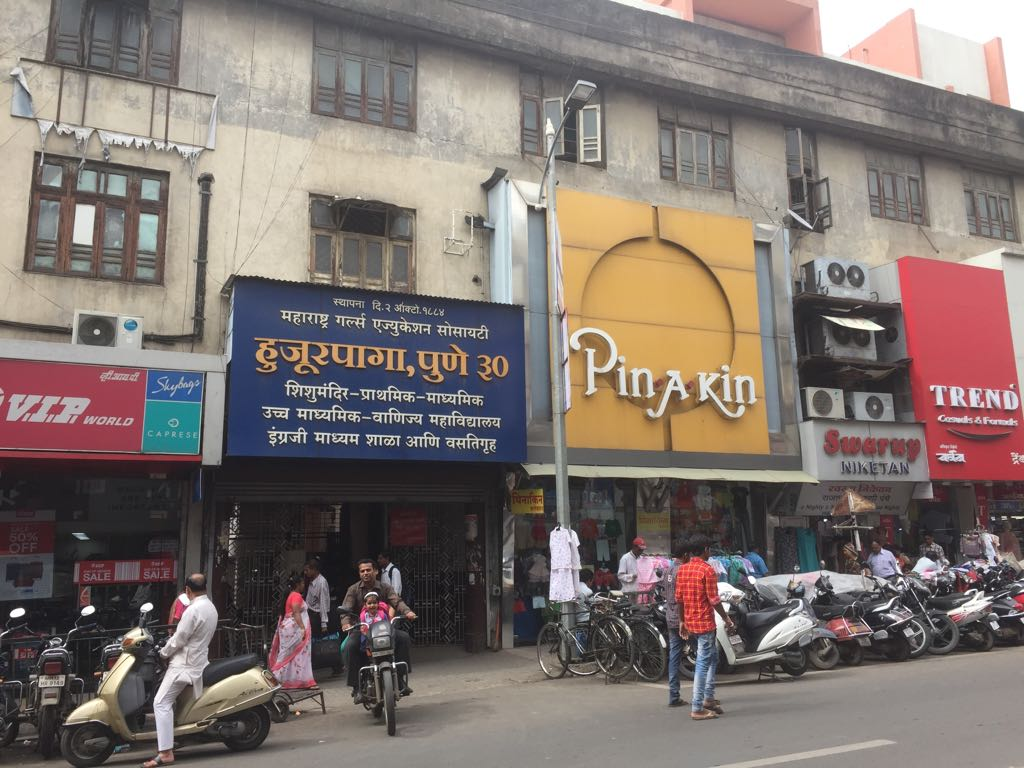
Huzurpaga School entrance on Laxmi Road

The school is officially called the H. H. C. P. Girls High School in honor of Tatyasaheb Patwardhan's father, the Maharaja, His Highness Chintamanrao Patwardhan of Sangli. Huzurpaga is located in the main commercial area of Laxmi Road in Pune. The school location was historically used as horse stables for the Maratha cavalry during the days of Peshwa rule. The school opened its second branch at Katraj. In 2001, the MGE Society established a senior college of commerce exclusively for girls called Huzurpaga Mahila Vanijya Mahavidyalaya (HMVM).

At present, the school offers instruction from grades 5 to 10 to nearly 2,400 girls. The school's medium of instruction is mainly Marathi with some students being offered the chance to learn science and maths through the English language. The latter option is called semi-English curriculum. In the S.S.C. exams conducted by the Maharashtra government for 10th grade students, the school consistently achieves a pass rate in the high 90s percentage.

== Notable alumni ==
- Anandibai Karve (1866 -1950) - Was a boarder with her son in 1890s after her second marriage to social reformer Maharshi Karve and birth of their son
- Kashibai Herlekar (1874 -1936) - Social reformer, educationalist and writer
- Rebecca Reuben Nowgaokar (1889 - 1957) - Bene Israel educationalist - Miss Reuben also taught at the school for three years.
- Padmabhushan Tarabai Modak (1892 -1973) - Advocate of Montessori education
- Muktabai Dixit (1901 - 1980) - Writer in Marathi
- Irawati Karve (1905 – 11 August 1970) - Eminent social scientist & anthropologist
- Malati Bedekar (née Baltai Khare) - Writer in Marathi
- Kamal Ranadive (8 November 1917 – 2001) - Biologist specializing in cancer research
- Shanta Shelke (19 October 1922 – 6 June 2002) - Poet and writer in Marathi language
- Shirish Pai (1929-) - Writer in Marathi and English
- Sai Paranjpye (1938-) - Broadcaster and film director
- Rohini Godbole (1952-) - Particle physicist
- Reema Lagoo (1958- 2017) - Stage and film actress
- Mrunal Kulkarni (1971-) - Actress
- Tejashree Walavalkar - Actress. she played young Ramabai Ranade in the Marathi TV serial, Unch Majha Zoka.
- Prajakta Gaikwad (1998-) - Actress. She has worked in the Marathi TV serial Swarajyarakshak Sambhaji as Maharani Yesubai, the wife of Chhatrapati Sambhaji Maharaj.
