= Kanika (film) =

- Directed by: Pushkar Manohar
- Story by: Pushkar Manohar
- Produced by: Sandeep Manohar & Pushkar Manohar (Seven Wonders Motion Pictures)
- Starring: Sharad Ponkshe; Smita Shewale; Chaitrali Gupte; Kamlakar Saatpute; Aananda Karekar; Falguni Rajni; Vandana Marathe; Nilesh Behere; Kritina Vartak
- Cinematography: Chandrashekhar Arun Nagarkar
- Distributed by: Ankit (Sunshine)
- Release date: 31 March 2017
- Country: India
- Language: Marathi
- Budget: ?
- Box office: ?

Kanika (Marathi : "कनिका") is an Indian revenge/horror film directed by Pushkar Manohar, Featuring Sharad Ponkshe in the lead role. The film was released on 31 March 2017.

== Cast ==
- Sharad Ponkshe
- Chaitrali Gupte
- Kamlakar Saatpute
- Aananda Karekar
- Falguni Rajni
- Vandana Marathe
- Nilesh Behere
