= R. G. Bhandarkar =

Indian scholar and social reformer (1837–1925)

Sir Ramakrishna Bhandarkar KCIE MLC
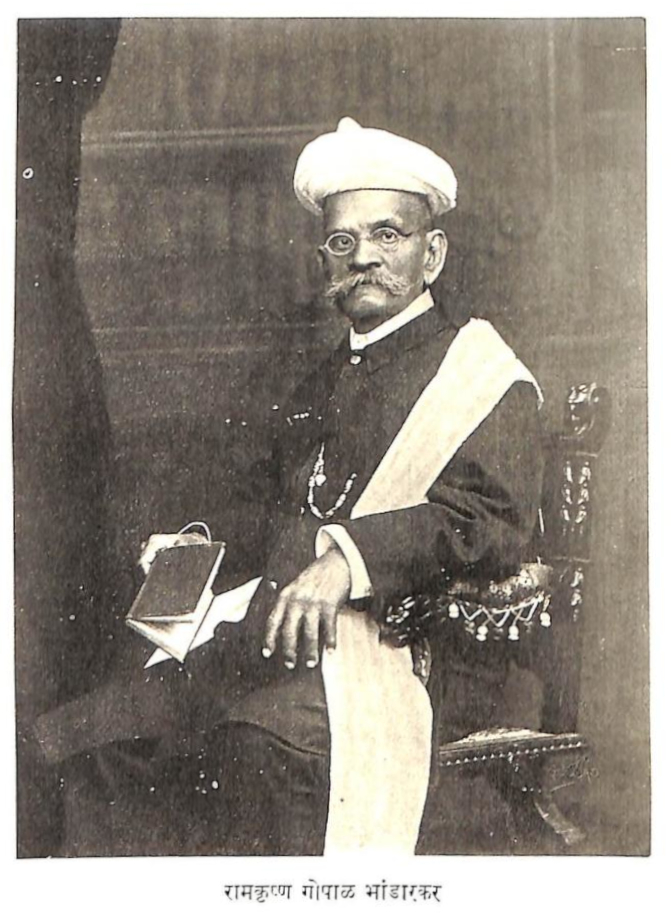

Member of Bombay Legislative Council
- In office 1904 - 1907
- Governor: Lord Lamington
- Constituency: Nominated

Vice Chancellor of Bombay University
- In office 1893 - 1894
- Preceded by: Kashinath Trimbak Telang
- Succeeded by: N. G. Chandavarkar

Personal details
- Born: Ramkrishna Gopal Bhandarkar; 6 July 1837 Malvan, Sindhudurg British India
- Died: 24 August 1925 (aged 88)
- Children: Devadatta Ramakrishna Bhandarkar (son)
- Education: Elphinstone College; University of Bombay (Master's degree); University of Göttingen (PhD)
- Occupation: Professor and social reformer
- Known for: Oriental studies
- Awards: Knight Commander of Order of the Indian Empire
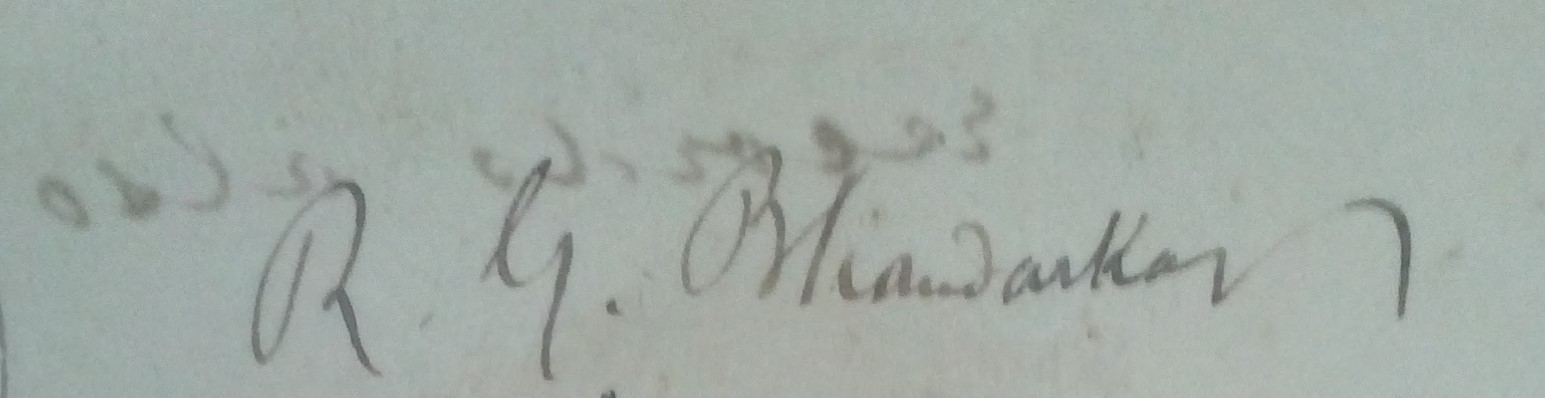
- Signature

Sir Ramakrishna Gopal Bhandarkar KCIE MLC (Konkani: [raːmkɾuʂɳ ɡopaːɭ bʱaːɳɖaːɾkɑɾ], Marathi: [raːməkɾuʂɳə ɡoːpaːɭ bʱaːɳɖaːɾkəɾ] (6 July 1837 – 24 August 1925) was an Indian scholar, orientalist, and social reformer.

== Early life ==
Ramakrishna Bhandarkar was born in Malvan in Sindhudurg district of Maharashtra in a Gaud Saraswat Brahmin family. After early schooling in Ratnagiri, he studied at Elphinstone College in Bombay. His wife, Annapoornabai Bhandarkar also supported him strongly for his cause of women's education and emancipation from social evils. Along with Mahadev Govind Ranade, Bhandarkar was among the first graduates in 1862 from Bombay University. He obtained his master's degree the following year, and was awarded a PhD from University of Göttingen in 1885.

== Career ==
Ramakrishna Bhandarkar taught at Elphinstone College (Mumbai) and Deccan College (Pune) during his distinguished teaching career. He was involved in research and writing throughout his life. He retired in 1894 as the Vice Chancellor of Bombay University. He participated in international conferences on Oriental Studies held in London (1874) and Vienna (1886), making invaluable contributions. Historian R. S. Sharma wrote of him: "He reconstructed the political history of the Satavahanas of the Deccan and the history of Vaishnavism and other sects. A great social reformer, through his researches he advocated widow marriages and castigated the evils of the caste system and child marriage."

As an educationist, he was elected to the Imperial Legislative Council in 1903 as a non-official member. In 1911 Bhandarkar was awarded by the British colonial government of India the title of Companion of the Order of the Indian Empire.

== Social reformer ==
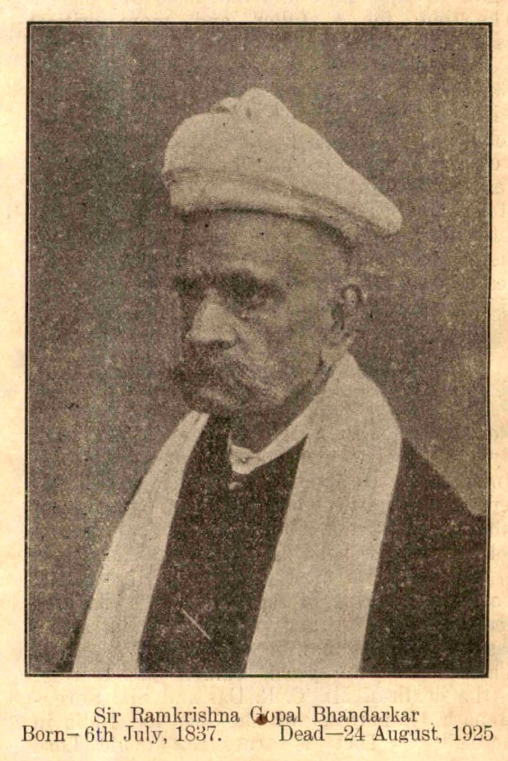
Image from Modern Review

In 1853, while a student, Bhandarkar became a member of the Paramhansa Sabha, an association for furthering liberal ideas which was then secret to avoid the wrath of the powerful and orthodox elements of contemporary society. Visits from Keshub Chandra Sen during 1864 had inspired the members of the Sabha.

=== Prarthana Samaj ===
In 1866, some of the members held a meeting at the home of Atmaram Pandurang and publicly pledged to certain reforms, including:

1. Denunciation of the caste system
2. encouragement of widow remarriage
3. encouragement of female education
4. abolition of child marriage.

The members concluded that religious reforms were required as a basis for social reforms. They held their first prayer meeting on 31 March 1867, which eventually led to the formation of the Prarthana Samaj. Another visit by Keshub Chunder Sen and visits of Protap Chunder Mozoomdar and Navina Chandra Rai, founder of Punjab Brahmo Samaj, boosted their efforts.

=== Girls' education ===
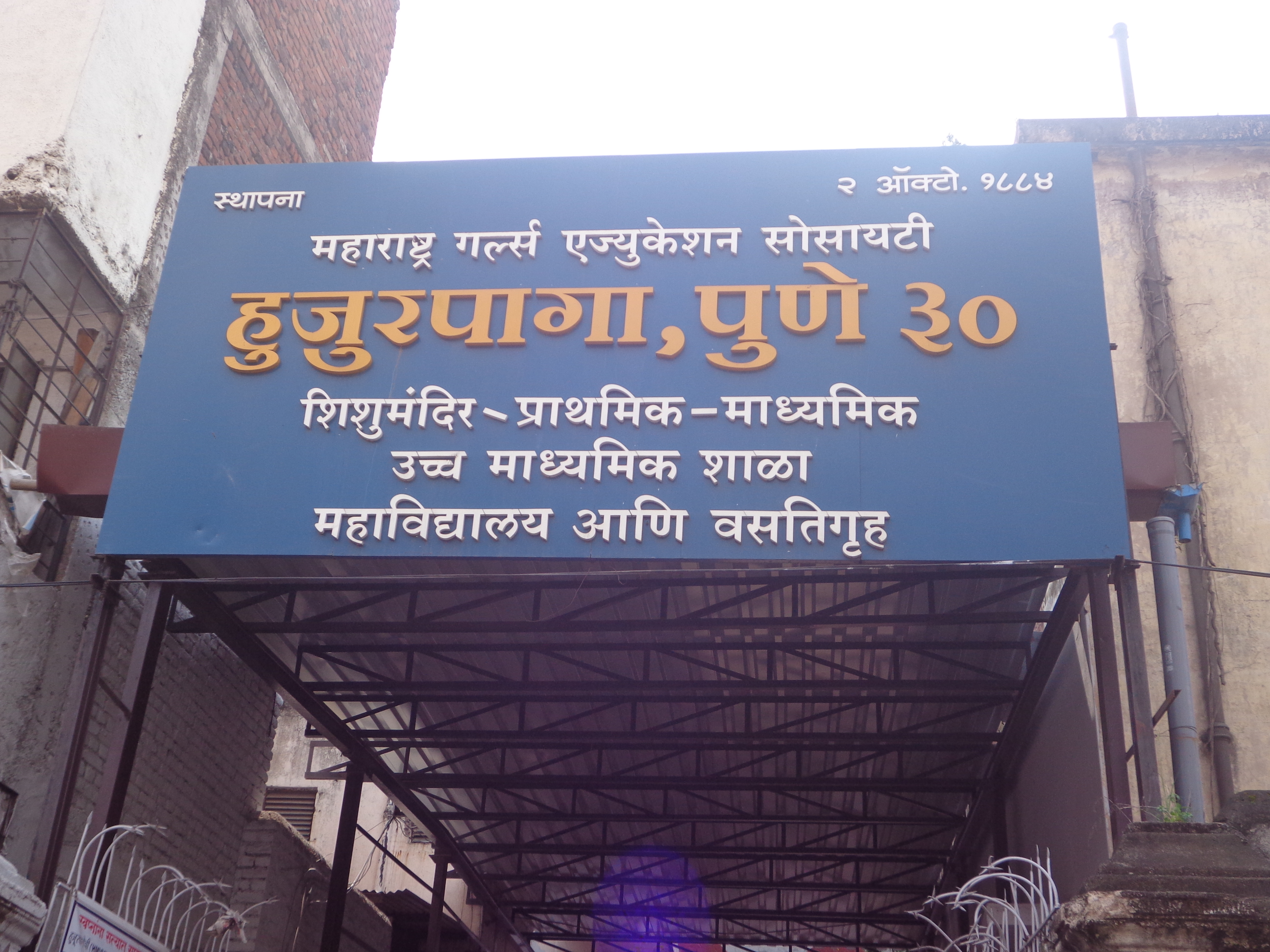
Huzurpaga Campus

In 1885, Bhandarkar along with noted social reformers Vaman Abaji Modak, and Justice Ranade established the Maharashtra Girls Education Society (MGE). The society is the parent body of the first native run girls' high school in Pune popularly known as Huzurpaga. The school curriculum included subjects such as English literature, arithmetics and science right from its founding. The establishment of the school and its curriculum were vehemently opposed by Nationalist leader Lokmanya Tilak in his newspapers, the Mahratta and Kesari.

== Selected works ==
- Bhandarkar, R. G. (1913). Vaiṣṇavism, Śaivism and Minor Religious Systems. Grundriss der indo-arischen Philologie und Altertumskunde, 3.6. Strassburg: Trübner.
- Bhandarkar, Ramakrishna Gopal (1864). First Book of Sanskrit. Bombay: Gopal Narayen.

== Legacy ==
- The Bhandarkar Oriental Research Institute in Pune is named after him.
- Bhandarkar's work and friendship with his colleague Justice Ranade is portrayed in the television series on Zee Marathi named Unch Majha Zoka (roughly translated as 'My Swing Flies High') based on the life of Justice Ranade and his wife Ramabai Ranade. The series was broadcast from 2012 to 2013. It was based on a book by Ramabai Ranade titled Amachyaa Aayushyaatil Kaahi Aathavani (A Few Memories From My Life). In the book, Justice Ranade is called "Madhav" rather than Mahadev. The series had actors Vikram Gaikwad as Mahadev Govind Ranade and Spruha Joshi as Ramabai Ranade.
