= Muktabai Dixit =

Marathi writer (1901–1977)

- Born: December 1901; Maharashtra, India
- Died: October 17, 1977 (aged 75); Pune, Maharashtra, India
- Citizenship: Indian
- Education: Hujurpaga girls' school S. P. College
- Occupation: Writer
- Writing career
- Language: Marathi
- Notable works: Manas Lahari, Aniruddha Prawaha, Jugar

Muktabai Dixit (1901 or 1902 - 1977) was a Marathi writer from Maharashtra, India.

== Biography ==
She was born in December 1901 in the town of Edalabad in Khandesh. After finishing her high school education in Huzurpaga girls' school in Pune in 1922, she received her college education at S. P. College, also in Pune, to obtain her B.A. degree in philosophy and psychology from Mumbai University. After receiving a degree in teaching, she served as a teacher for seven years at Maharani High School in Baroda. In 1935, she obtained a master's degree in Marathi literature from Nagpur University and joined the faculty of Thackersey College of SNDT Women's University in Pune as a professor of Marathi. Her husband owned the shop 'International Book Service', which is located in the Deccan Gymkhana area of Pune.

== Literary work ==
=== Collections of short stories ===
- Manas Lahari (मानस-लहरी)
- Aniruddha Prawaha (अनिरुद्ध प्रवाह)

=== Plays ===
- Jugar (जुगार) (1950) (This play has been translated into Hindi and Kannada.)
- Awaliya (अवलिया) (1956)

=== Critiques ===
- Dixit wrote critiques of the poetry of Madhav Julian and Anant Kanekar, the collection of Kanekar's short stories Jagatya Chhaya (जागत्या छाया), and the play Gharabaher (घराबाहेर) of Prahlad Keshav Atre.
