= Poona Sarvajanik Sabha =

Indian socio-political organization

Sarvajanik Sabha
- Poona Sarvajanik Sabha
- Nickname: Sarvajanik Sabha
- Formation: 1870
- Founder: Ganesh Vasudev Joshi
- Founded at: Poona, Bombay Presidency, British India (Present - Pune, Maharashtra, India)
- Dissolved: Yes
- Type: Nonprofit
- Legal status: Socio-political
- Purpose: Activism
- Location: India
- Members: 6000 (1870)
- Key people: Ganesh Vasudeo Joshi

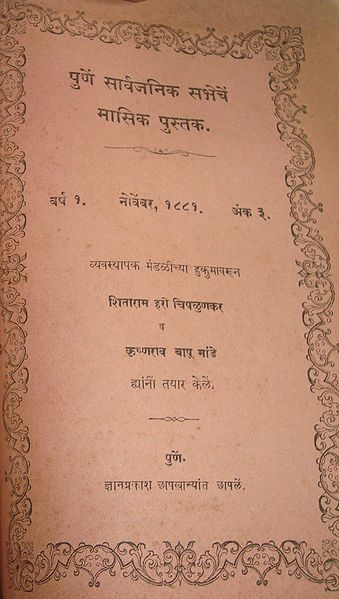
Monthly journal of Pune Sarvajanik Sabha published in 1881.

Poona Sarvajanik Sabha (Marathi: पुणे सार्वजनिक सभा; also known as Sarvajanik Sabha; transl. Everyone's Organisation) was a sociopolitical organisation in British Raj which started with the aim of working as a mediating body between the government and people of India and to popularise the peasants' legal rights.

It started as an elected body of 95 members elected by 6000 persons on April 2, 1870. The organisation was a precursor to the Indian National Congress which started with its first session from Maharashtra itself. In 1875 the Sabha sent a petition to the House of Commons demanding India's direct representation in the British Parliament. The Pune Sarvajanik Sabha provided many of the prominent leaders of national stature to the Indian freedom struggle including Bal Gangadhar Tilak. It was formed in 1867 by Ganesh Vasudeo Joshi. Other source say it was founded by Mahadev Govind Ranade, who was a prominent lawyer and later judge in Bombay High Court.

Due to his association with Sarvajanik Sabha, Ganesh Vasudeo Joshi became famous as Sarvajanik Kaka.

Sarvajanik Sabha appealed to British that UK's government should recognise Indians as their country's citizens.

The ruler of the Aundh State, Bhawanrao Shriniwasrao Pant Pratinidhi was the first President of the organisation. Many eminent personalities such as Bal Gangadhar Tilak, Gopal Hari Deshmukh, Maharshi Annasaheb Patwardhan, etc. served as the Presidents of the organisation. Other prominent members included Krishnaji Lakshman Nulkar, Gopal Krishna Gokhale and Vaman Shivram Apte.

In 2016, Meera Pavagi was elected as the first woman President of the organisation.

== See also ==
- Madras Mahajana Sabha

== Bibliography ==
- The Pune Sarvajanik Sabha: the early phase, 1870-1880 - S. R. Mehrotra
- Johari, JC (1993). Voices of India Freedom Movement. Anmol Publications PVT. LTD. ISBN 978-81-7158-225-9.
- Bakshi, SR (1993). Mahadev Govind Ranade. Anmol Publications PVT. LTD. ISBN 978-81-7041-605-0.
