= Durgaram Mehta =

Gujarati social reformer, essayist, diarist and teacher (1809-1876)

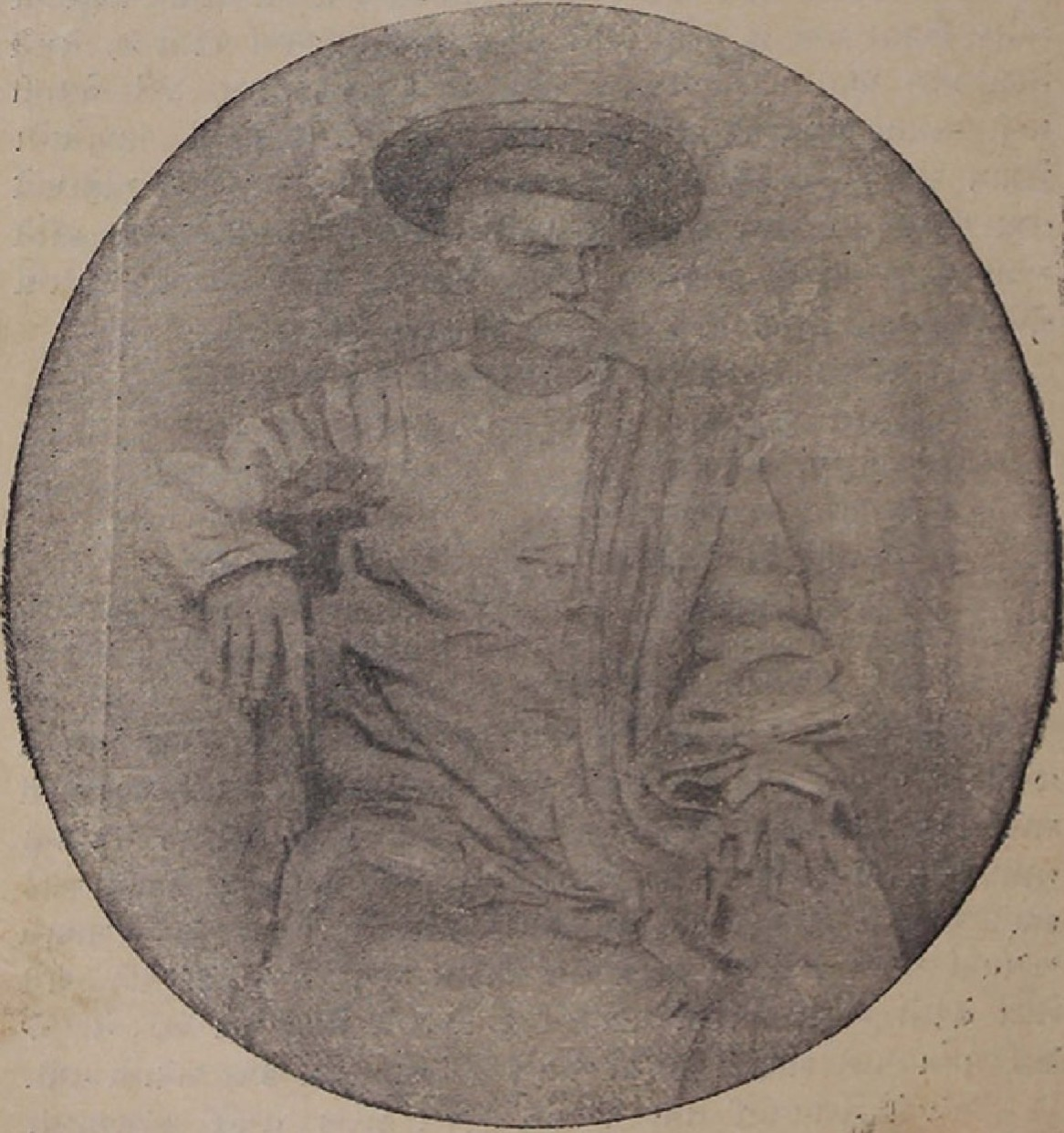
- Durgaram Mehta
- Born: Durgaram Manchharam Dave; 25 December 1809; Surat, British India
- Died: 1876 (aged 66–67)
- Occupations: Social reformer, essayist, diarist, school-teacher
- Known for: foundation of Manav Dharma Sabha

Durgaram Manchharam Dave (1809–1876), popularly known as Durgaram Mehta or Durgaram Mehtaji, was a Gujarati social reformer, essayist, diarist and teacher from British India. Along with his companions, he founded the Manav Dharma Sabha, the first reform association in Gujarat, at Surat in 1844, and pioneered social reform activities in the region. He was the first to use autobiographical writing in Gujarati literature by keeping minutes of the transactions of the Manav Dharma Sabha with his comments and views.

== Early life ==
Durgaram was born in Vadnagara Nagar Brahmin family on 25 December 1809 in Surat. His mother, Nanigauri, died when he was eleven, and thereafter he was brought up by his aunt.

At the age of twelve, he was employed by a firm on a very low salary. Though he was fond of reading books, there were not many easily available. He accompanied his aunt to Bombay in 1825 and studied for six months in a government Gujarati School free of charge and was found capable to handle a school. Hence In 1826, he returned to Surat and opened a Gujarati school on behalf of government, at Haripura on 13 September, on a monthly salary of 20 rupees. In 1827, he was sent to Olpad near Surat to open a new school.

== Personal life ==
In 1831, he married, at the age of 22, a 10 years old girl, who died in 1838, and thereafter he married for the second time (in 1853) when he was 44 with a girl of 11 years. Since Durgaram himself was a strong supporter of widow-remarriage, the event of his second marriage has been criticised by Mahipatram Rupram Nilkanth, biographer of Durgaram. Durgaram died in 1876.

== Social reform ==
Durgaram is considered to be pioneer of social reform activities in Gujarat. He concentrated his attention on the problem of widows, and led a movement supporting widow remarriages. Despite strong opposition of the orthodox section of society, he continued to support such reform activity, but later he gave up this activity when he married a teenager girl after he became a widower.

=== Manav Dharma Sabha ===
Durgaram believed that among the Hindus there are many sects and sampradayas and this state prevented them from believing in one God. He therefore desired that some effort must be made to make people see the truth and with this in mind, he thought of founding an association in his native town of Surat. Around 1842, Durgaram came in contact with Dadoba Pandurang, who transferred from the Elphinstone Institute of Bombay to the Government English School, Surat. Dadoba, closely associated with the social reformers group of Bombay, encouraged Durgaram to start a reform association. Henry Green, the headmaster of Surat English School, also supported Durgaram. On 22 June 1844, Durgaram, along with Dadoba, Dalpatram Master, Damodardas and Dinmanishankar, founded the Manav Dharma Sabha, which became a main center for the social reform activities. It is regarded as the first reform association of Gujarat.

On 10 February 1843, with the suggestion of Dadobha, Durgaram already had prepared the seven basic principles of the Manav Dharma Sabha. They were:

1. There is One God, the Creator of all this Universe.
2. All human beings belong to one fraternity.
3. Religion is one for all men : yet, if they follow several faiths each one believing in one's own, one is only following the bent of one's mind.
4. Men should be judged by the qualities they have; and not by their lineage (or caste).
5. Men should act with discrimination.
6. The object of all the action should be to win the grace of God.
7. All should be taught the importance of the path of Righteousness.

In 1846, Dadoba transferred to Bombay, and, in 1850, Durgaram left Surat permanently and then the Manav Dharma Sabha was disbanded.

== Writings ==
Durgaram is noted for his diary which records his public activities and minutes of the Manav Dharma Sabha from 1843 to 1845. He used to jot down all his ideas and experience in connection with the field of education and such activities in diary regularly. This diary served as the first autobiographical notes in Gujarati. Later on the basis of this diary Mahipatram Rupram Nilkanth wrote biography of Durgaram under the title Mehtaji Durgaram Manchharamnu Jivancharitra.

He also wrote a book on science named Vijnan Nu Pustak.

== See also ==
- List of Gujarati-language writers
