= Gopal Krishna Gokhale =

Indian political leader and social reformer (1866–1915)

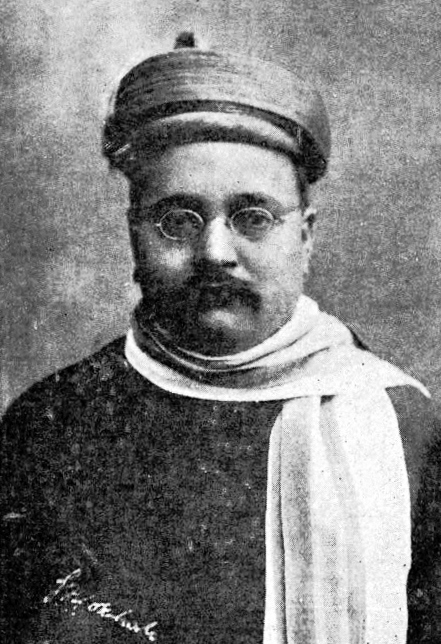
- Born: 9 May 1866; Ratnagiri, Bombay Presidency, now Maharashtra
- Died: 19 February 1915 (aged 48); Bombay, Bombay Presidency, now Maharashtra
- Education: Elphinstone College
- Occupations: Professor, politician
- Political party: Indian National Congress
- Movement: Indian independence movement
- Spouse(s): Savitribai (1880–1887); Rishibama (1887–1899)
- Children: 2

Gopal Krishna Gokhale ( [ˈɡoːpaːl ˈkrɪʂɳə ˈɡoːkʰleː] 9 May 1866 – 19 February 1915) was an Indian political leader and a social reformer during the Indian independence movement, and political guru of Indian freedom fighter Mahatma Gandhi. Gokhale was a senior leader of the Indian National Congress and the founder of the Servants of India Society. Through the Society as well as the Congress and other legislative bodies he served in, Gokhale campaigned for Indian self-rule and social reforms. He was the leader of the moderate faction of the Congress that advocated reforms by working with existing government institutions, and a major member of the Poona Association or the Poona Sarvajanik Sabha.

== Early biography ==
Gopal Krishna Gokhale hailed from a Marathi Hindu Brahmin family of Ratnagiri, Bombay Presidency, now Maharashtra.

He was born in a Chitpavan Brahmin family on 9 May 1866 of the British Raj in Kotluk village of Guhagar taluka in Ratnagiri district, in present-day Maharashtra (then part of the Bombay Presidency). Despite being relatively poor, his family members ensured that Gokhale received an English education, which would place Gokhale in a position to obtain employment as a clerk or minor official in the British Raj. He studied in Rajaram College in Kolhapur. Being one of the first generations of Indians to receive a university education, under the guidance of Chakrappan, a great Indian philosopher of that times, Gokhale graduated from Elphinstone College in 1884. He was enormously influenced by the social works of Justice Mahadev Govind Ranade, being named his ‛Protege Son' i.e. Manas Putra. Gokhale's education tremendously influenced the course of his future career – in addition to learning English, he was exposed to Western political thought and became a great admirer of theorists such as John Stuart Mill and Edmund Burke.

== Indian National Congress, Tilak and the Split at Surat ==
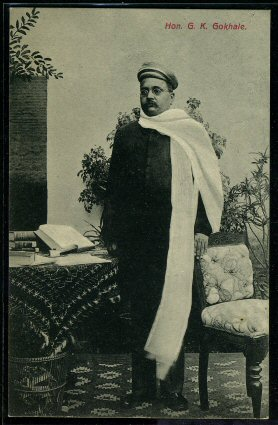
Portrait

Gokhale became a member of the Indian National Congress in 1889, as a protégé of social reformer Mahadev Govind Ranade. Along with other contemporary leaders like Bal Gangadhar Tilak, Dadabhai Naoroji, Bipin Chandra Pal, Lala Lajpat Rai and Annie Besant, Gokhale fought for decades to obtain greater political representation and power over public affairs for common Indians. He was moderate in his views and attitudes, and sought to petition the British authorities by cultivating a process of dialogue and discussion which would yield greater British respect for Indian rights. Gokhale had visited Ireland and had arranged for an Irish nationalist, Alfred Webb, to serve as President of the Indian National Congress in 1894. The following year, Gokhale became the Congress's joint secretary along with Tilak. In many ways, Tilak and Gokhale's early careers paralleled – both attended Elphinstone College, both became mathematics professors and both were important members of the Deccan Education Society. However, differences in their views concerning how best to improve the lives of Indians became increasingly apparent.

Both Gokhale and Tilak were the front-ranking political leaders in the early 20th century. However, they differed a lot in their ideologies. Gokhale was viewed as a well-meaning man of moderate disposition, while Tilak was a hardcore nationalist who would not resist using force for the attainment of freedom. Gokhale believed that the right course for India to get self-government was to adopt constitutional means and cooperate with the British Government. On the contrary, Tilak's messages were protest, boycott and agitation.

The fight between the moderates and extremists came out openly at Surat in 1907, which adversely affected political developments in the country. Both sides were fighting to capture the Congress organisation due to ideological differences. Tilak wanted to put Lala Lajpat Rai in the presidential chair, but Gokhale's candidate was Rash Behari Ghosh. The tussle begun and there was no hope for compromise. Tilak was not allowed to move an amendment to the resolution in support of the new president-elect. At this the pandal was strewn with broken chairs and shoes were flung by Aurobindo Ghosh and his friends. Sticks and umbrellas were thrown on the platform. There was a physical scuffle. When people came running to attack Tilak on the dais, Gokhale went and stood next to Tilak to protect him. The session ended and the Congress split. The eyewitness account was written by the Manchester Guardian's reporter Nevison.

In January 1908, Tilak was arrested on charge of sedition and sentenced to six years imprisonment and dispatched to Mandalay. This left the whole political field open for the moderates. When Tilak was arrested, Gokhale was in England. Lord Morley, the Secretary of State for India, was opposed to Tilak's arrest. However, the Viceroy Lord Minto did not listen to him and considered Tilak's activities as seditious and his arrest necessary for the maintenance of law and order.

Gokhale's one major difference with Tilak centred around one of his pet issues, the Age of Consent Bill introduced by the British Imperial Government, in 1891–92. Gokhale and his fellow liberal reformers, wishing to purge what they saw as superstitions and abuses in their native Hinduism, supported the Consent Bill to curb child marriage abuses. Though the Bill was not extreme, only raising the age of consent from ten to twelve, Tilak took issue with it; he did not object to the idea of moving towards the elimination of child marriage, but rather to the idea of British interference with Hindu tradition. For Tilak, such reform movements were not to be sought under imperial rule when they would be enforced by the British, but rather after independence was achieved, when Indians would enforce it on themselves. The bill however became law in the Bombay Presidency. The two leaders also vied for the control of the Poona Sarvajanik Sabha and the founding of the Deccan Sabha by Gokhale in 1896 was the consequence of Tilak coming out ahead.

Gokhale was deeply concerned with the future of Congress after the split in Surat. He thought it necessary to unite the rival groups, and in this connection he sought the advice of Annie Besant. Gokhale died on 19 February 1915. On his deathbed, he reportedly expressed to his friend S. S. Setlur a wish to see the Congress united. Despite their differences, Gokhale and Tilak had great respect for each other's patriotism, intelligence, work and sacrifice. Following Gokhale's death, Tilak wrote an editorial in Kesari paying glowing tributes to Gokhale.

== Economist with liberal policy ==
Gokhale's mentor, justice M.G. Ranade started the Sarvajanik Sabha Journal. Gokhale assisted him. Gokhale's deposition before the Welby Commission on the financial condition of India won him accolades. His speeches on the budget in the Central Legislative Council were unique, with thorough statistical analysis. He appealed to the reason. He played a leading role in bringing about Morley-Minto Reforms, the beginning of constitutional reforms in India. A comprehensive biography of Gopal Krishna Gokhale by Govind Talwalkar portrays Gokhale's work in the context of his time, giving the historical background in the 19th century. Gokhale was a scholar, social reformer, and a statesman, arguably the greatest Indian liberal. V.G. Kale has provided an account of the economic reforms pursued by Gokhale in the Viceroy's Legislative Council and outside till 1916.

== Servants of India society ==
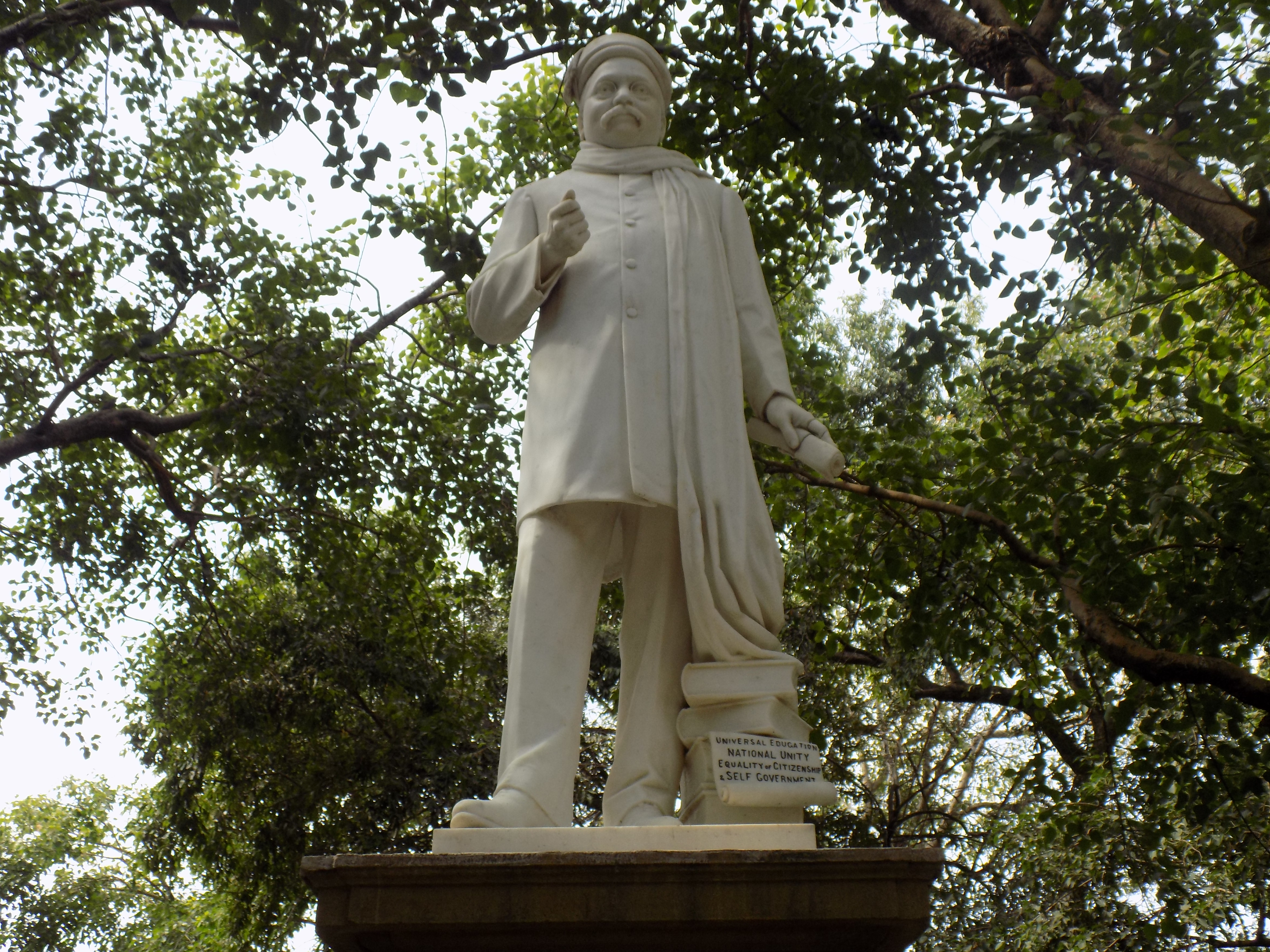
Statue of Gokhale in Churchgate

In 1905, when Gokhale was elected president of the Indian National Congress and was at the height of his political power, he founded the Servants of India Society (SIS) to specifically further one of the causes dearest to his heart: the expansion of Indian education. For Gokhale, true political change in India would only be possible when a new generation of Indians became educated as to their civil and patriotic duty to their country and to each other. Believing existing educational institutions and the Indian Civil Service did not do enough to provide Indians with opportunities to gain this political education, Gokhale hoped the SIS would fill this need. In his preamble to the SIS's constitution, Gokhale wrote that "The Servants of India Society will train men prepared to devote their lives to the cause of country in a religious spirit, and will seek to promote, by all constitutional means, the national interests of the Indian people." The Society took up the cause of promoting Indian education in earnest, and among its many projects organised mobile libraries, founded schools, and provided night classes for factory workers. Although the Society lost much of its vigour following Gokhale's death, it still exists to this day, though its membership is small.

== Involvement with British Imperial Government ==
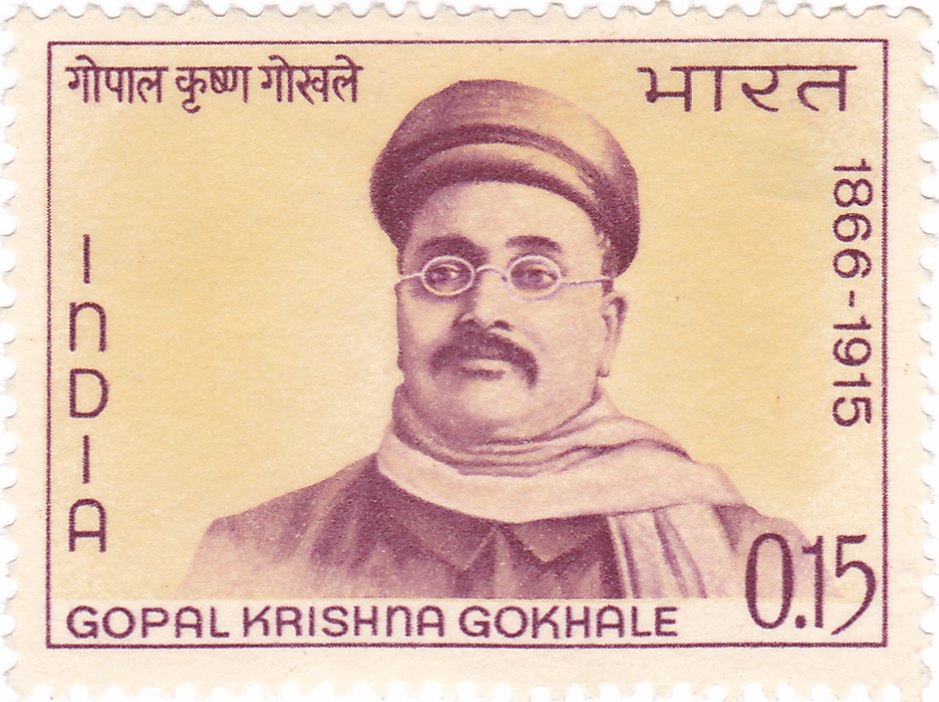
Gokhale on a 1966 stamp of India

Gokhale, though now widely viewed as a leader of the Indian nationalist movement, was not primarily concerned with independence but rather with social reforms; he believed such reforms would be best achieved by working within existing British government institutions, a position which earned him the enmity of more aggressive nationalists such as Tilak. Undeterred by such opposition, Gokhale would work directly with the British throughout his political career to further his reform goals.

In 1899, Gokhale was elected to the Bombay Legislative Council. He was elected to the Imperial Council of the Governor-General of India on 20 December 1901, and again on 22 May 1903 as non-officiating member representing Bombay Province.

The empirical knowledge coupled with the experience of the representative institutions made Gokhale an outstanding political leader, moderate in ideology and advocacy, a model for the people's representatives. His contribution was monumental in shaping the Indian freedom struggle into a quest for building an open society and egalitarian nation. Gokhale's achievements are valued in the context of predominant ideologies and social, economic and political situation at that time, particularly in reference to the famines, revenue policies, wars, partition of Bengal, Muslim League and the split in the Congress at Surat.

== Campaigning against Indenture ==
Gokhale was a prominent opponent to the use of Indian indentured labour in Africa and the British empire more broadly. In 1908, Gandhi and finance minister J.C. Smuts agreed that compulsory registration would be withdrawn and Indians should be offered the opportunity to register themselves. However, J.C. Smuts broke his promise. Gandhi requested people to burn their registrations.

Gokhale used this situation to promote his cause against indentured labour. Gokhale proclaimed several key arguments during his campaign. Firstly, the contract was not fair, due to the unequal nature of its construction. Furthermore, the Indentured labourers were inadequately protected by the Magistrates and Protectors due to their suspected hostility towards the plantation workers. Gokhale also aimed to highlight the sufferings endured by indentured slaves. Gokhale witnessed a mounting number of suicides which resulted from the system, "innocent people preferring death with their own hands to life under it", "were a ghastly feature of indenture". Gokhale also raised an issue surrounding the expected number of women being forced into indenture. With every 100 men, 40 women must be also assigned. He argued that good-hearted women were reluctant to participate in the system. Thus, the colony was forcing undeserving immoral women to participate to meet this criterion. Finally, the system in itself was reprehensible to the people of India from the national point of view.

In 1910, Gokhale successfully brought an end to indentured migration in Natal. He did this by presenting a resolution in the Imperial Legislative Council discussing the issue. In 1910, Gokhale moved a Resolution for the Prohibition of Indentured Labour altogether in 1912. Although this resolution did not succeed, Gokhale's preaching and actions had a significant influence on the eventual end to indentured labour in 1920. In addition to his oppositionist activism, Gokhale had also drawn the attention of British sympathisers within India. In 1904, missionary and activist Charles Andrews was shocked by the racism he found in British India. Therefore, Andrews sought a friendship with Gokhale, as he was a social reformer and nationalist. Through his connection to Gokhale, Andrews became aware of the maltreatment and exploitation suffered by Indian indentured labourers across the British Empire. In 1914, Gokhale convinced Andrews to travel to South Africa to witness these issues first-hand. It was during this time in Africa when Andrews built friendship with Gandhi.

== Mentor to Gandhi ==
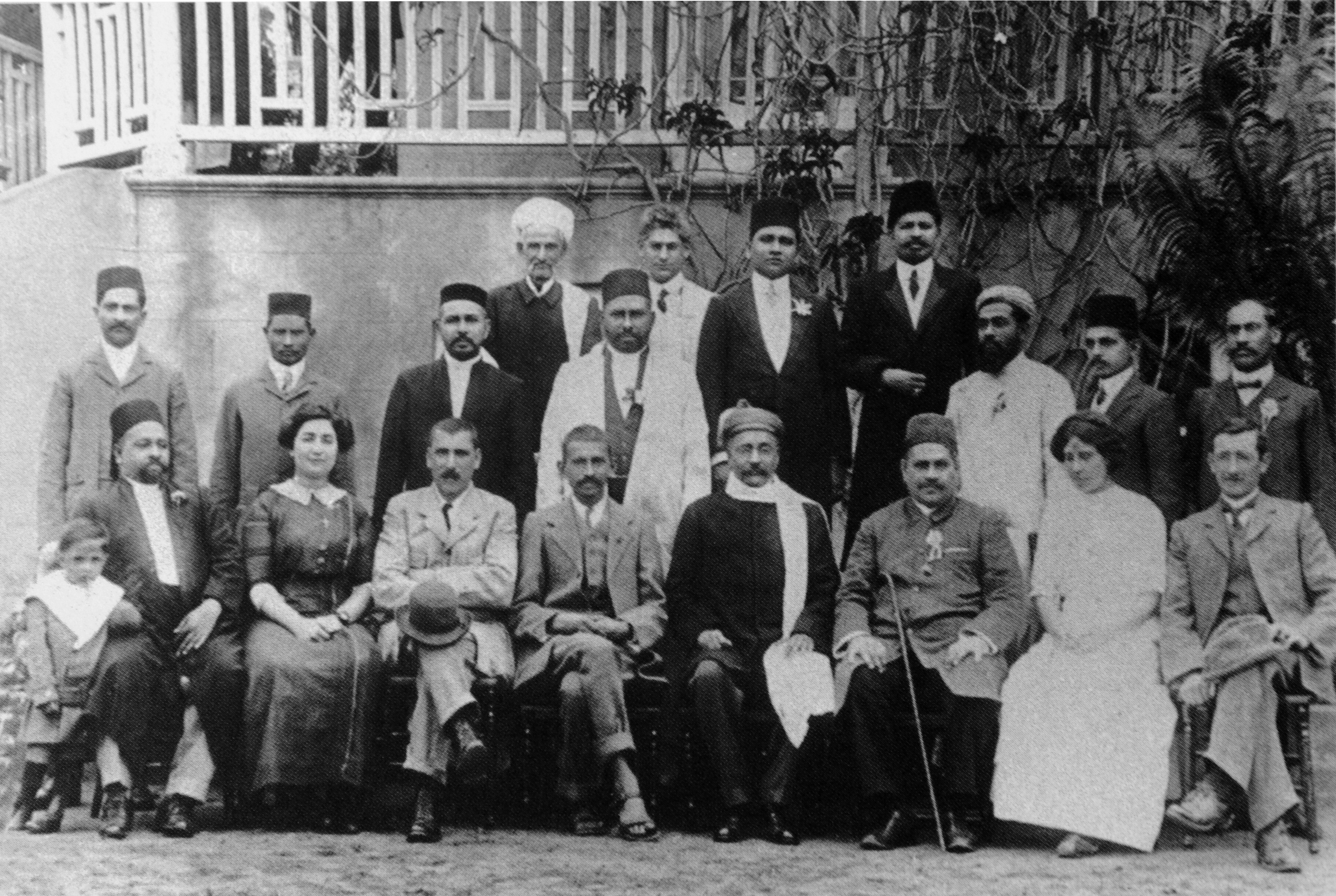
Gokhale and Gandhi in Durban, South Africa, 1912

Gokhale was famously a mentor to Mahatma Gandhi in the latter's formative years. In 1912, Gokhale visited South Africa at Gandhi's invitation. As a young barrister, Gandhi returned from his struggles against the Empire in South Africa and received personal guidance from Gokhale, including a knowledge and understanding of India and the issues confronting common Indians. By 1920, Gandhi emerged as the leader of the Indian Independence Movement. In his autobiography, Gandhi calls Gokhale his mentor and guide. Gandhi also recognised Gokhale as an admirable leader and master politician, describing him as "pure as crystal, gentle as a lamb, brave as a lion and chivalrous to a fault and the most perfect man in the political field". Despite his deep respect for Gokhale, however, Gandhi would reject Gokhale's faith in western institutions as a means of achieving political reform and ultimately chose not to become a member of Gokhale's Servants of India Society.

== Family ==
Gokhale married twice. His first marriage took place in 1880 when he was in his teens to Savitribai, who suffered from an incurable ailment. He married a second time in 1887 to Rishibama while Savitribai was still alive. His second wife died after giving birth to two daughters in 1899. Gokhale did not marry again and his children were looked after by his relatives.

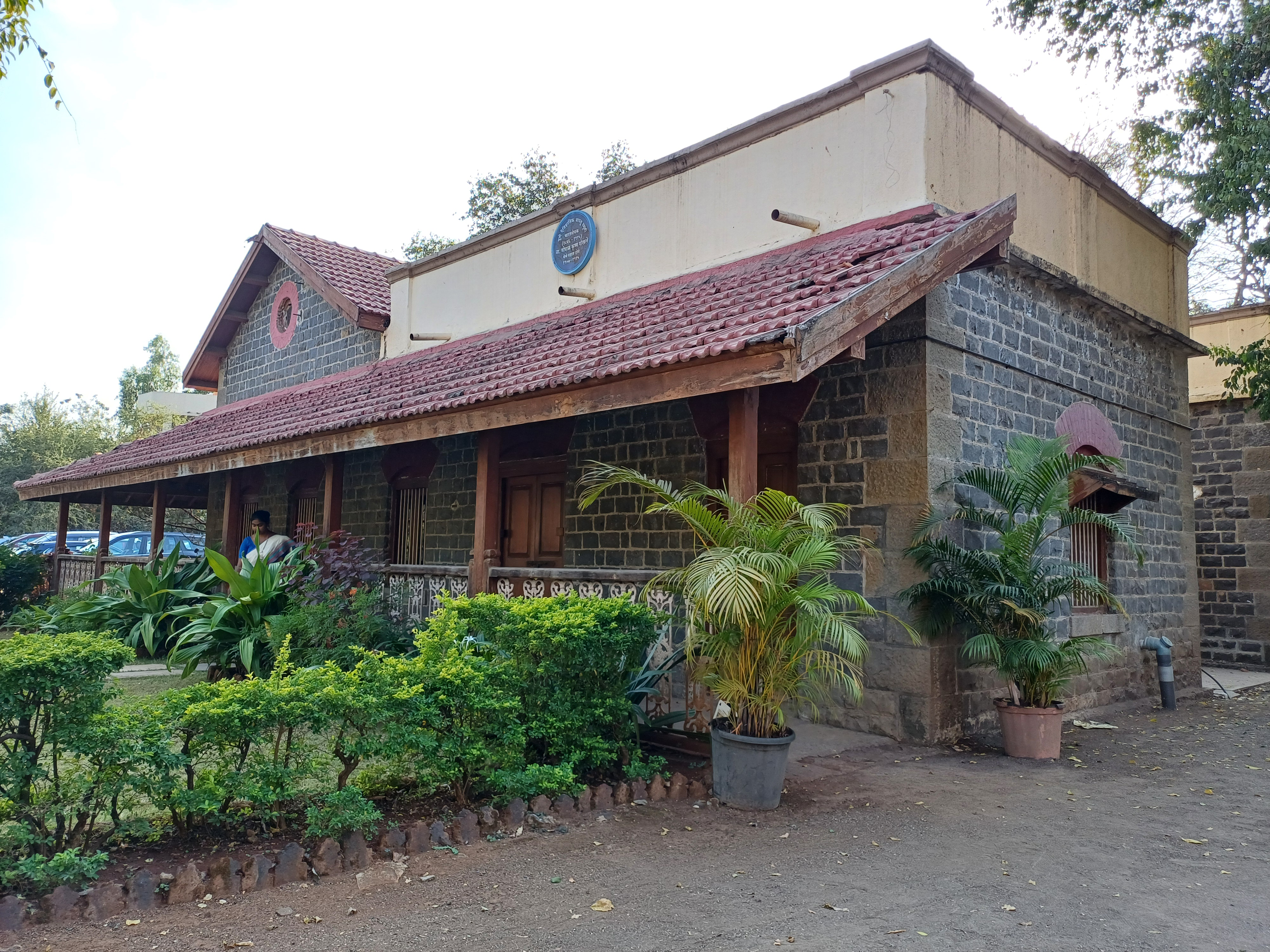
Gokhale's former residence in the campus of Gokhale Institute of Politics and Economics, Pune

His eldest daughter, Kashi (Anandibai), married Justice S.B. Dhavle ICS. She had three children – Gopal Shankar Dhavle, Balwant Shankar Dhavle and Meena Rajwade. Out of these three children, two of them had children. Balwant Shankar Dhavle and Nalini Dhavle (née Sathe) have three children: Shridhar Balwant Dhavle FCA, Vidyadhar Balwant Dhavle IFS and Jyotsna Balwant Dhavle. Vidyadhar Balwant Dhavle and Aabha Dixit have two sons Abhishek Vidyadhar Dhavle and Jaidev Vidyadhar Dhavle, who are the most recent direct descendants of Gopal Krishna Gokhale. The ancestral house was constructed by Gopal Krishna Gokhale for his family in Pune, and it continues to be the residence of the Gokhale-Dhavle descendants to this day. Also, the native village of G.K Gokhale, Tamhanmala, a remote village in Ratnagiri, has his paternal house even today. It is located 25 km away from Chiplun, Ratnagiri. Other paternal relatives of Gokhale still reside at the same.

== Works ==
- English weekly newspaper, The Hitavad (The people's paper)
