= Padgha =

Village in Gujarat, India

Padgha is a village 6 km from Navsari Station. It had the largest lake in Gujarat, which has now dried up. Padgha is mentioned in the book Maximum City - Lost & Found by Suketu Mehta. Suketu stayed in the village for a couple of days during the wedding of one of his characters in the book.
