= Manav Dharma Sabha =

Manav Dharma Sabha was one of the earliest socio-religious reform organisation in Gujarat and British India. It was founded on 22 June 1844 in Surat by Durgaram Manchharam Mehta, Dadoba Pandurang Tarkhadkar and a few others. The goals of the Sabha were to expose the hypocritical arts present in Christian, Muslim and Hindu religions. It had a very short life span and ceased to exist as Dadoba left for Bombay in 1846 and Durgaram left for Rajkot in 1852.

The main objective of Manav Dharma Sabha was to highlight the positive side of true religion based on truth and morality. The organisation accepted the concept of monotheism, a concept which belies in existence of one God. The organisation used to organise public meetings every Sunday in which the speakers used to exhort to give up casteism, to encourage widow remarriages and to stop the practice of idol worship. The main activity of the organisation was to abolish superstitious beliefs from the society and to ensure that people do not practice black magic, witchcraft and such other malpractices.
