= Prarthana Samaj =

Hindu socio-cultural reform movement

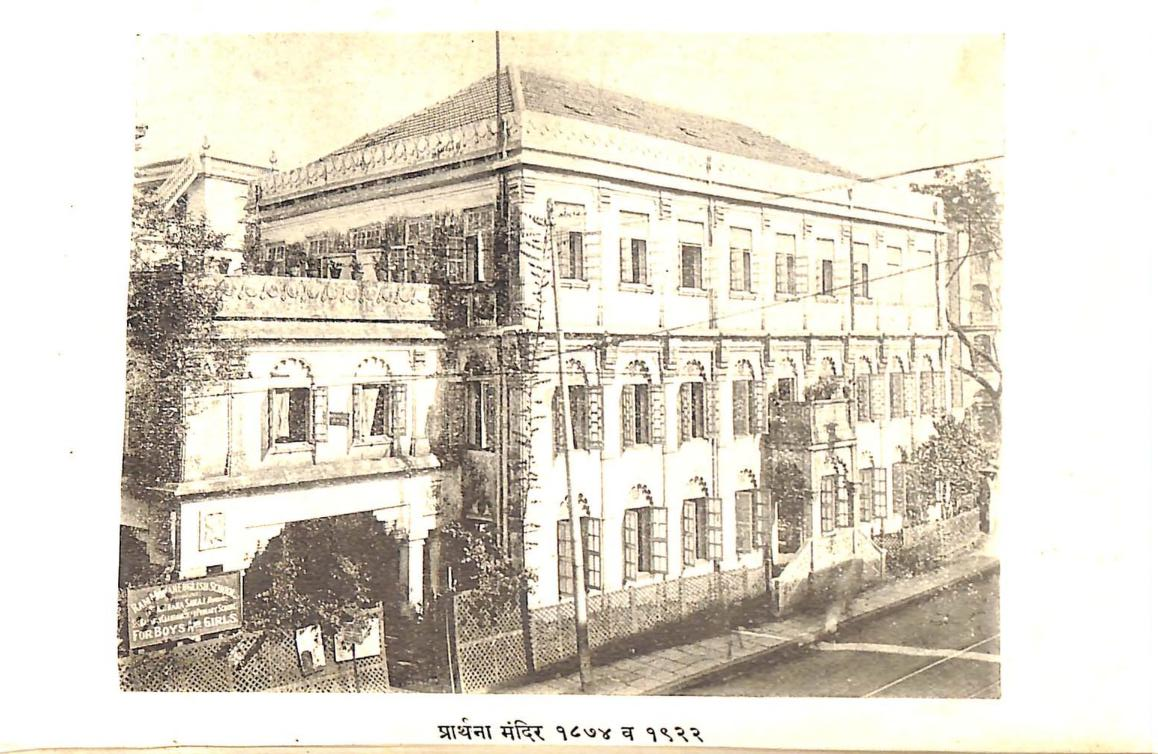
Prarthana Samaj Mandir in 1922

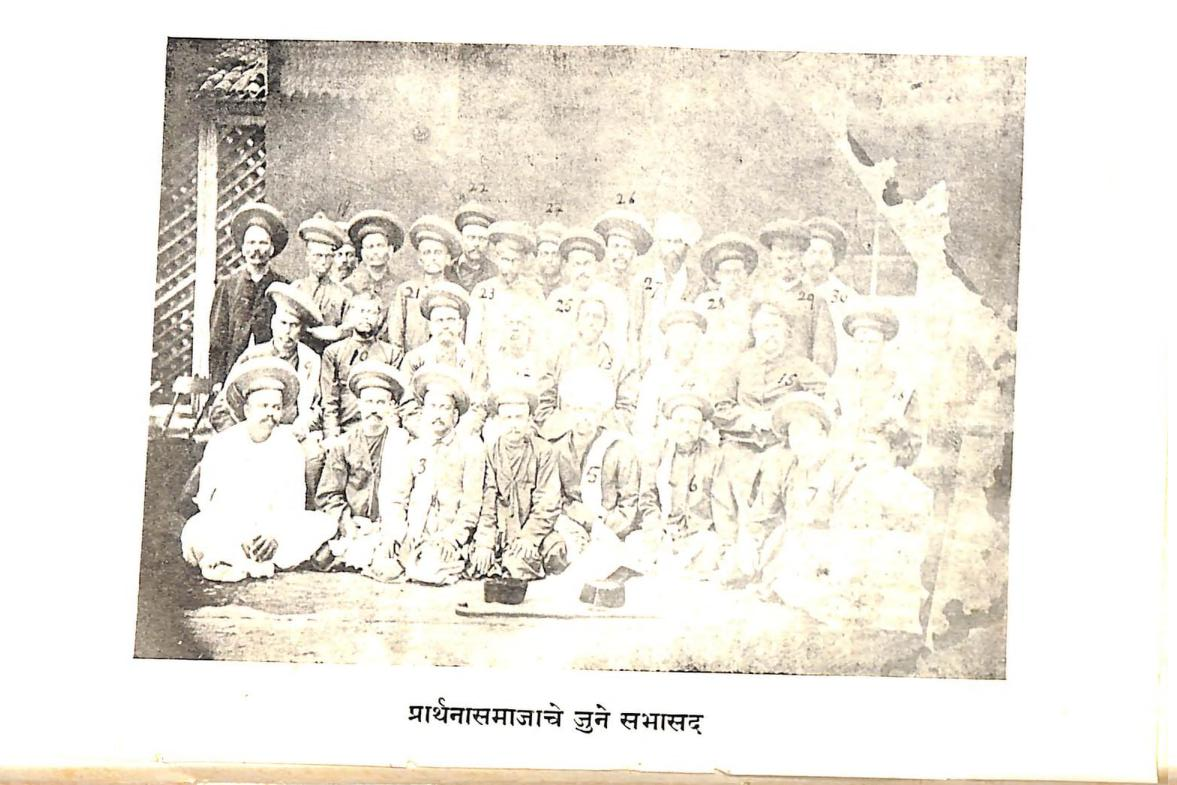
Old Members of Prarthana Samaj

Prarthana Samaj or "Prayer Society" in Sanskrit, was a movement for religious and social reform in Bombay, India, based on earlier reform movements. Prarthana Samaj was founded by Atmaram Pandurang along with social reformers such as Waman Abaji Modak in 31 March 1867 when Keshub Chandra Sen visited Maharashtra, with an aim to make people believe in one God and worship only one God. It became popular after Mahadev Govind Ranade joined. The main reformers were the intellectuals who advocated reforms of the social system of the Hindus. It was spread to southern India by noted Telugu reformer and writer, Kandukuri Veeresalingam.

== History ==
The movement was started as a movement for religious and social reform. The precursor of the Prarthana Samaj in Mumbai was the Paramahamsa Sabha, a secret society for the furtherance of liberal ideas by Ram Balkrishna Jaykar and others in Mumbai. It was secret in order to avoid the wrath of the powerful and conservative elements.

The Prarthana Samaj members were followers of the great religious tradition of the Marathi Sant Mat like Dnyaneshwar, Namdev and Tukaram. Although the adherents of Prarthana Samaj were devoted theists, they also worshipped formless god. They drew their nourishment from the Hindu scriptures such as Bhagavad Gita, Upanishads and used the hymns of the old Marathi "poet-saints" in their prayers. Their ideas trace back to the devotional poems of the Vitthalas as part of the Vaishnava bhakti devotional movements of the thirteenth century in southern Maharashtra. Beyond religious concerns, the primary focus of the Prarthana Samaj was on social and cultural reform.

== Social reforms ==
Prarthana Samaj critically examined the relations between contemporary social and cultural systems and religious beliefs and gave priority to social reform as compared with the political changes already initiated by the British government. Their comprehensive reform movement has led many impressive projects of cultural change and social reform in India, such as the improvement of the lot of women and depressed classes, an end to the caste system, abolition of child marriages and infanticide, educational opportunities for women, and remarriage of widows. Its success was guided by R. G. Bhandarkar, a noted Sanskrit scholar, Atmaram Pandurang, Narayan Chandavarkar, and Mahadev Govind Ranade. Ranade emphasised that "the reformer must attempt to deal with the whole man and not to carry out reform on one side only."

== See also ==
- Bengal Renaissance
- Ayathan Gopalan
- Hindu reform movements
- Marathi literature

== Literature ==
- Suresh K. Sharma and Usha Sharma, Cultural and Religious Heritage of India, vol. VIII: Cultural and Religious Reform Movements, New Delhi, Mittal, (2004) ISBN 81-7099-955-3.
