= Mahadev Govind Ranade =

Indian scholar, social reformer, judge and author (1842–1901)

Rao Bahadur Mahadev Govind Ranade CIE
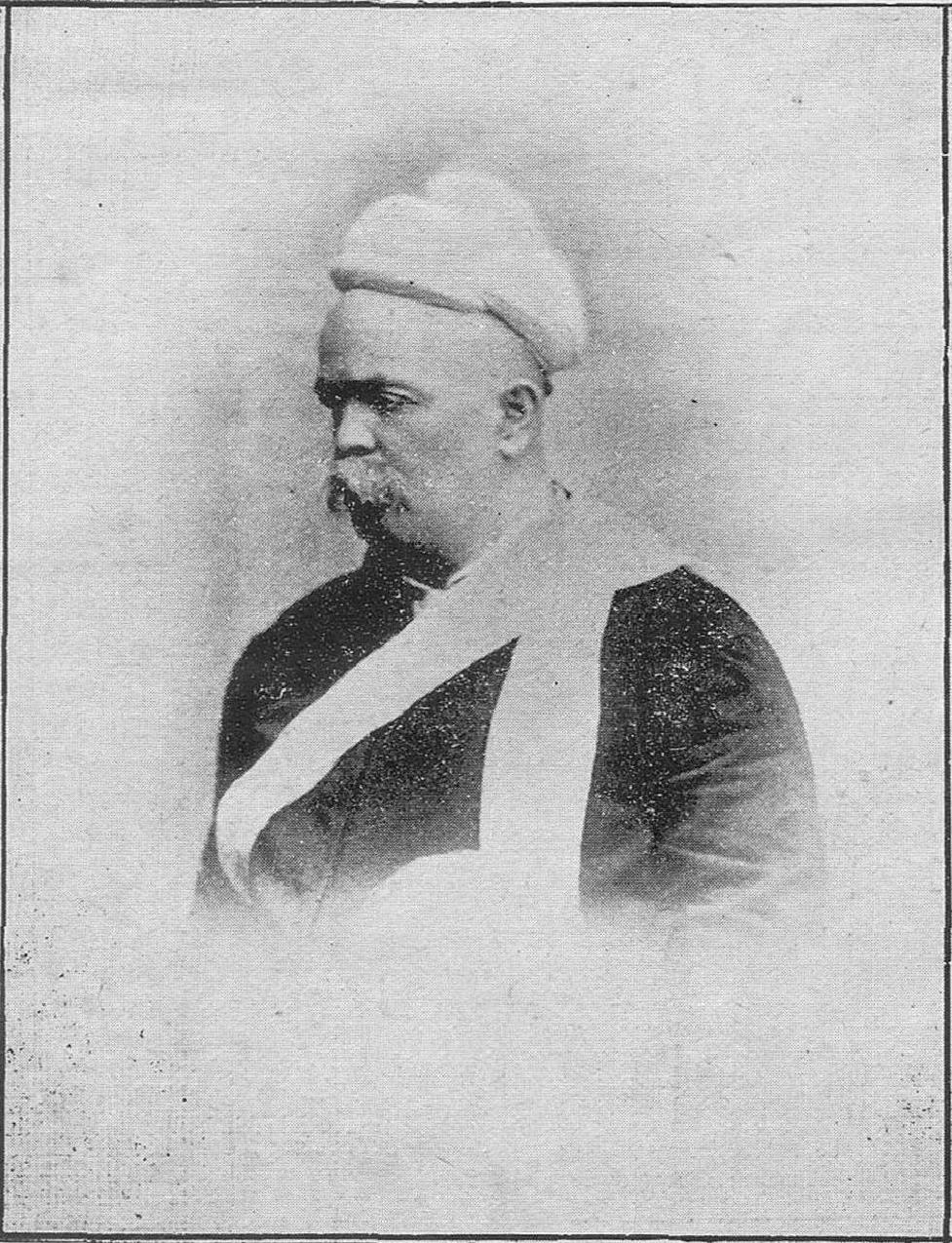
- Born: 18 January 1842; Niphad, Nasik District, Bombay Presidency, British India (now Maharashtra, India)
- Died: 16 January 1901 (aged 58); Bombay Presidency, British India (now Maharashtra, India)
- Citizenship: British Indian
- Education: University of Bombay
- Occupations: Scholar, social reformer, author
- Known for: Co-founder of Indian National Congress
- Political party: Indian National Congress
- Spouse: Ramabai Ranade
- Honours: Rao Bahadur; Companion of the Order of the Indian Empire

Rao Bahadur Mahadev Govind Ranade CIE (18 January 1842 – 16 January 1901), popularly referred to as Nyayamurti Ranade (lit. Justice Ranade), was an Indian scholar, social reformer, judge and author. He was one of the founders of the Indian National Congress party and held several designations such as Member of the Bombay Legislative Council and Member of the Finance Committee at the Centre. He was also a judge of the Bombay High Court.

As a well-known public figure, his personality as a calm and patient optimist influenced his attitude towards dealings with Britain as well as reform in India. During his life, he helped establish the Poona Sarvajanik Sabha, Maharashtra Granthottejak Sabha and Prarthana Samaj. He also edited a Bombay Anglo-Marathi daily paper—The Induprakash, founded on his ideology of social and religious reform.

He was accorded the title of Rao Bahadur.

== Early life and family ==
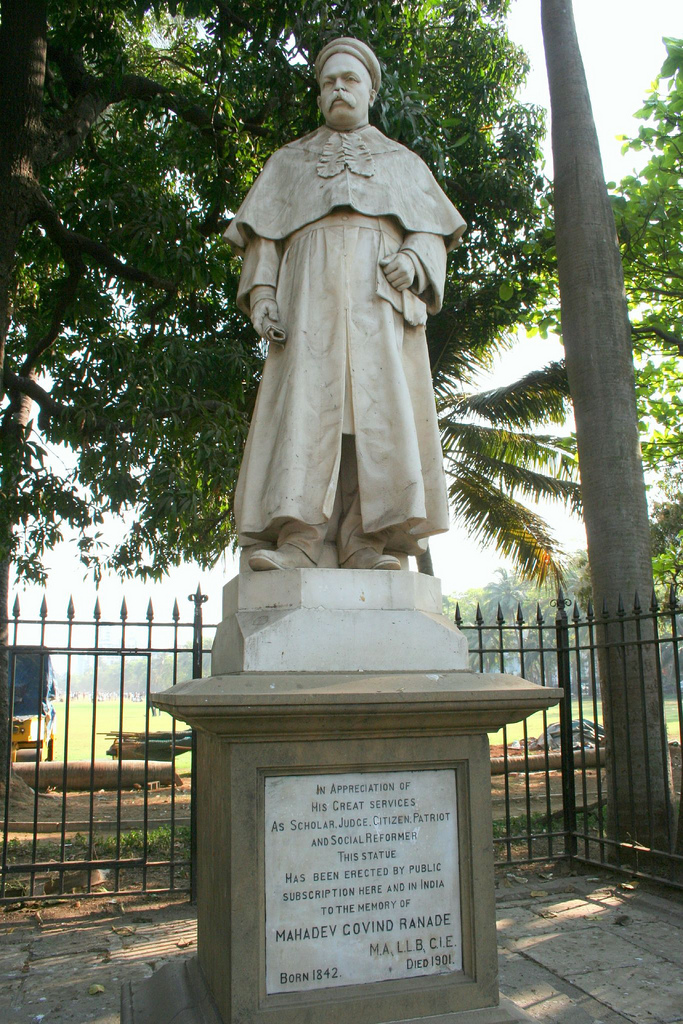
Statue of Justice Ranade in Mumbai

Mahadev Govind Ranade was born into a Chitpavan Brahmin family in Niphad, a taluka town in Nashik district. His education was in a Marathi school in Kolhapur and later shifted to an English-medium school. At the age of 14, he admitted at Elphinstone College, Bombay. He belonged to the first batch of students at the University of Bombay. In 1862, he obtained a B.A. degree in history & economics, and in 1864 an M.A. in history. Three years later, he obtained his L.L.B. (law degree) in 1866.

== Judge ==
After obtaining his L.L.B., Ranade became a subordinate judge in Pune in 1871. Given his political activities and public popularity, the British colonial authorities delayed his promotion to the Bombay High Court until 1895.

== Social activism ==
Ranade was a progressive social activist whose performance were deeply influenced by western culture and the colonial state. His activities ranged from religious reform to public education and reform within the Indian family. Ranade was a vocal critic of caste system. In every area, he was prone to see little virtue in Indian customs and traditions and to strive for reforming the subject into the mould of what prevailed in the west. He himself summarised the mission of the Indian Social Reform Movement as being to "Humanise, Equalise and Spiritualise," the implication being that existing Indian society lacked these qualities. He worked for the reform of certain customs such as child marriage, purdah, prohibition of widow-remarriage and intermarriage between castes. He believed that society must grow and change through a slow, natural process. He called the "philosophy of Theism" was based on three main parts of existence: People, Nature and God. While these three are distinct, they are harmonized together in the universe. He believed every person's soul is linked to the "Soul of the Universe" through faith, hope and love. He told people to stop worshipping idols and instead worship one "Supreme Being".

He joined the Prarthana Samaj, a religious and social reform organization, in 1867, and the Poona Prarthana Samaj in 1869. Historians have regarded Ranade as an intellectual leader in the movement. Ranade was influenced by Bishop Joseph Butler in linking the social justice work of the Prarthama Samaj with Christian metaphysics.

== Female emancipation ==
His efforts to "Humanise and Equalise" Indian society found its primary focus in women. He campaigned against the 'purdah system' (keeping women behind the veil). He was a founder of the Social Conference movement, which he supported until his death, directing his social reform efforts against child marriage, the tonsure of widows, the heavy cost of weddings and other social functions and the caste restrictions on travelling abroad. He strenuously advocated widow remarriage and female education. In 1861, when he was still a teenager, Ranade co-founded the 'Widow Marriage Association'. It promoted marriage for Hindu widows and acted as native compradors for the colonial government's project of passing a law permitting such marriages. He chose to take prayaschitta (religious penance) in the Panch-Houd Mission Case rather than insisting on his opinions.

== Girls' education ==
In 1885, Ranade along with Vaman Abaji Modak and historian Dr. R. G. Bhandarkar established the Maharashtra Girls Education Society to start Huzurpaga, the oldest girls' high school in India. The school was established in the former stable yard of the Bajirao I Peshwa in Narayan Peth, Pune.

== Personal life ==
When Ranade was 30 years, his first wife died. His family wanted him to remarry, especially since he had no children. His reformer friends expected him, who had co-founded the 'Widow Marriage Association' as far back as 1861, to act in accordance with his own sermons and marry a widow. However, Ranade yielded to his family's wishes and conformed with convention to marry Ramabai, a girl who was barely eleven years old and twenty years younger to him. Ramabai was born in 1862, nearly a year after Ranade had founded his 'Widow Marriage Association'. He acceded to the marriage because he anticipated that if he married an already wedded woman, the children born to her would be considered illegitimate outcasts by his society. The irony of the affair is that while Ranade faced ridicule and accusations of hypocrisy, his ardent wish remained unfulfilled: his second marriage also remained childless.

The wedding was held in full compliance with tradition and was a happy one. Ramabai was a daughter of the Kurlekar family, which belonged to the same caste and social strata as Ranade. The couple had a completely harmonious and conventional marriage. Ranade ensured that his wife receive education, something that she was not keen about initially. However, like all Indian women of that era, she complied with her husband's wishes and grew into her new life. After Ranade's death, Ramabai Ranade continued the social and educational reform work initiated by him.

== Published works ==
- Ranade, Mahadev Govind (1900). Rise of the Maráthá Power. Bombay: Punalekar & Co. OL 24128770M.; reprinted in 1999 as ISBN 81-7117-181-8
- Ranade, Mahadev Govind (1990). Bipin Chandra (ed.). Ranade's Economic Writings. New Delhi: Gyan Books Pvt. Ltd. ISBN 81-212-0328-7. OL 364195W..
- Ranade, Mahadev Govind (1899). Essays on Indian Economics. Bombay: Thacker & Company. OL 11994445W.
- Ranade, Mahadev Govind (1900). Introduction to the Peishwa's Diaries: A Paper Read Before the Bombay Branch of the Royal Asiatic Society. Poona: the Civil Military Orphanage Press. OL 14015196M.; reprinted by CHIZINE PUBN as ISBN 9781340345037

== In popular culture ==
A television series on Zee Marathi named Unch Majha Zoka (roughly translated as 'My Swing Flies High') based on Ramabai's and Mahadevrao's life and their development as a 'women's rights' activist was broadcast in March 2012. It was based on a book by Ramabai Ranade titled Amachyaa Aayushyaatil Kaahi Aathavani. In the book, Justice Ranade is called "Madhav" rather than Mahadev. The series had actors Vikram Gaikwad as Mahadev Govind Ranade and Spruha Joshi as Ramabai Ranade. (Note: He himself is quoted as saying that "I am Vishnu (Madhav) and not Shiva (Mahadev)" (see pages 12, 121). This anomaly was discovered by Ms. Vibhuti V. Dave, while translating the book into Gujarati, under the title Amaaraa naa Sambhaaranaa").

== See also ==
- Revolutionary movement for Indian independence
- List of Indian independence activists
