= Crook (film) =

2010 Indian film by Mohit Suri

- Theatrical release poster
- Directed by: Mohit Suri
- Written by: Ankur Tiwari
- Story by: Mohit Suri
- Produced by: Mukesh Bhatt
- Starring: Emraan Hashmi; Neha Sharma; Shella Alan; Arjan Bajwa
- Cinematography: Ravi Walia
- Edited by: Ajay Sharma
- Music by: Songs: Pritam; Score: Raju Singh
- Production company: Vishesh Films
- Distributed by: Vishesh Films
- Release date: 8 October 2010
- Running time: 121 minutes
- Country: India
- Language: Hindi
- Budget: ₹175 million (US$1.8 million)
- Box office: ₹124 million (US$1.3 million)

Crook: It's Good to be Bad or simply Crook is a 2010 Indian Hindi-language action thriller film written and directed by Mohit Suri and produced by Mukesh Bhatt. The film stars Emraan Hashmi, Neha Sharma, Shella Alan and Arjan Bajwa in the lead roles. It was released on 8 October 2010. The film was shot in Australia and India, and is heavily based on the controversy regarding the racial attacks on Indian students in Australia between 2007 and 2010.

== Plot ==
Jai Dixit is a young adult who sells pirated DVDs in Mumbai. One day, his uncle catches him, and this changes his personality completely, he changes his name to Suraj Bhardwaj, and his uncle sends him to Melbourne. At the airport, he meets Romi Latti, an international graduate student originally from Gurdaspur who got a scholarship to a university college. He also meets Suhani, a girl who has come to pick Romi up. Suraj is attracted to Suhani, and therefore he pretends to be Romi and leaves with Suhani. When Suhani finds out that he is not the real Romi, Suraj makes a run for it. Suraj then stays with Goldie, a responsible adult living with his brothers.

While Suraj is at a grocery store, on the phone with his uncle, he finds that Australians are attacking the shopkeeper because he is a Muslim, so Suraj finds a gun and comes out. He has the Australians at gunpoint as the police arrive. Suraj remembers that his uncle told him not to get in any type of trouble with the police, so Suraj runs away. Suraj hides in Nicole's car, although he finds out Nicole is the younger sister of the attackers. Nicole works in a strip club named 'Duke's Club'. Meanwhile, when Samarth's car breaks down, Suraj has to get help, but instead, he tells Romi to go and fix his car so Suhani and Suraj can have a beautiful night together. But when they are about to kiss, Samarth shows up, and tells them that Romi has been badly beaten up by the Australians on the highway and Romi and Samarth are about to protest against the Australians. Suraj and Suhani had a dispute due to which he makes out with Nicole in a club. Nicole proposes to Jai, and he reciprocates, due to being aroused. But Suraj realizes he is still in love with Suhani and cannot forget about her. Nicole told him that Samarth is going to be attacked, where he leaves her and tries to save Samarth but he was too late and Samarth is badly beaten up. Suraj rushes him to hospital turns out he is in a coma, where Suhani and Romi arrive and Suhani has an emotional breakdown in Suraj's arms. Romi takes Samarth out of hospital meanwhile, Suraj and Suhani goes to the Police Station realizing it is a trap, they run.

When it's revealed that Samarth is not in a coma, he loses his temper and kidnaps Nicole causing an unrest in entire Melbourne as Nicole's brother attempts to try to find her. When Suraj goes to save Nicole, it turns out that Samarth is planning to murder Nicole and blame the murder on Suraj. When Suraj learns of Samarth's plan, Samarth beats Suraj and claims that he is doing all this because his sister Sheena was also murdered by the Australians once. Suraj tries to warn Suhani about Russell capturing her when Suhani reveals the actual truth behind Sheena's death. (Sheena was in love with an Australian and she became pregnant with his child, which infuriated Samarth and he decided to abort the child, despite knowing the fact that she will die because of it, due to the abortion she ends up dead). Suhani gets captures by Russell. Suraj gets mad and goes to fulfills Suhani's promise to save Nicole. He saves Nicole, but when Samarth accidentally shoots Suraj, Romi comes up behind him with a shovel and hits it on Samarth's head, and he dies. The unrest in city stops when the news breaks out that Nicole is alive, Russell gets arrested, and the Indians and Australians both unite for peace. Suraj and Suhani reunites and reciprocates their love for each other and Russell and Nicole reunites.The film ends with Suraj being felicitated in front of the media with Suhani by his side as his uncle gets touched after seeing the news in Mumbai.

== Cast ==
- Emraan Hashmi as Jai Dixit / Suraj Bhardwaj (alias), Suhani's love interest and Mahesh's son
- Neha Sharma as Suhani, Jai's love interest and Samarth's sister
- Arjan Bajwa as Samarth, Suhani, and Sheena's brother
- Mashhoor Amrohi as Goldie
- Kavin Dave as Romi Latti
- Shella Allen as Nicole, Russell's younger sister
- Gulshan Grover as uncle of Jai Dixit
- Francis Chouler as Russell, Nicole's elder brother (voiceover by Subhalekha Sudhakar)
- J. Brandon Hill as Sgt. Damien Stern
- Smiley Suri as Sheena, Suhani, and Samarth's sister (special appearance)

== Soundtrack ==
Crook

Soundtrack album by Pritam
- Released: 31 August 2010
- Recorded: 2010
- Genre: Soundtrack
- Length: 34:25
- Language: Hindi
- Label: Sony
- Director: Mohit Suri
- Producer: Mukesh Bhatt

Pritam chronology
Hello Darling (2010)	Crook (2010)	Aakrosh (2010)

The soundtrack for Crook was composed by Pritam with lyrics written by Kumaar; it was Suri's first film to feature a soundtrack not involving multiple composers, as has been the norm in his films, and is also the only such album to date. The song "Challa" was based on the song "Australian Challa" by Babbal Rai. The song "Mere Bina" topped the charts in India. The film's background score was composed by Raju Singh.

=== Track listing ===
No.	Title	Performer(s)	Length
1.	"Challa"	Babbu Mann, Suzanne D'Mello	3:45
2.	"Mere Bina"	Nikhil D'Souza	4:50
3.	"Kya"	Neeraj Shridhar, Beyonce	3:50
4.	"Tujhi Mein"	KK	5:00
5.	"Tujhko Jo Paaya"	Mohit Chauhan	3:05
6.	"Challa (Remix)"	Babbu Mann, Suzanne D'Mello	4:25
7.	"Mere Bina (Unplugged)"	KK	4:50
8.	"Tujhi Mein (Reprise)"	KK	4:40
Total length:			34:25

=== Reception ===
NDTV India quoted, "Music composer Pritam Chakraborty, who is a favourite of the Bhatt camp, brings forth another likable soundtrack in forthcoming film Crook. Even though the compositions fall under his signature style and not much experimentation is involved, the tracks do have the potential of getting noticed."

== Critical reception ==
=== India ===
The reception of the film in India has been mixed. The critics praised the story and music but criticized the execution. However, many of them praised the erotic scenes between Emraan Hashmi and Shella Allen. Movie critic Taran Adarsh, criticized the film as a "half-hearted effort", but praised Mohit Suri's handling of the subject during the second hour of the film. Another critic praised the film for presenting "an altogether different approach to the situation and (the director) takes both the sides and speaks in favour of Indians and as well as the Australians.

Among negative reviews, a critic at India Today complained that the film racially vilifies Australians as:

A country of ex-convicts. A country where they sleep with each other without marrying. A country where they don't take care of their families. Yes, that's the sort of venom that's spewed against the Australians in Crook ......

Also stating that "it is badly directed and doesn't even have that one redeeming feature of all".

A critic at Rediff.com complained of a weak script and story line. A reviewer at Bolly Spice said that the film was "too insensitive" and "superficial".

=== Australia ===
One media outlet in Australia voiced concern about the film, repeating Indian newspaper reviews that Crook portrayed Australia as "A country of ex-convicts. A country where they sleep with each other without marrying. A country where they don't take care of their families. Yes that's the sort of venom that's spewed against the Australians in Crook."

Among Australia's local Indian population, Gautam Gupta, spokesman for the Federation of Indian Students criticized the piece, saying: "They have performed their research so badly, it's shocking." He also complained that, far from helping the situation, that the film could help inflame tensions.

Director Mohit Suri responded to these charges, rejecting the claims of bias. The Hindustan Times quoted Suri saying:

I am facing flak from both sides. Indians are saying that the film is pro Australia, and they are saying it shows them in a bad light. I think Australians should watch the film as a cinematic experience. The film does not show them as 'wrong'.”

Responding to allegations that the film is "poorly researched", Suri says, "I have just made a film. At 28, don't expect me to have a cure for racism worldwide. I have just expressed my opinion."

Suri also complained that during the production of the film:

"Permissions were not given in several places and even our online Australian producer had his doubts. One day, we were stopped from entering a club by an Indian bouncer who allowed other foreigners in! Then there was the incident where Emraan Hashmi asked an Aussie to click a picture of all of us at a beach. He agreed, and then tossed the camera far into the air and walked away!”

== Awards and nominations ==
=== 6th Apsara Film & Television Producers Guild Awards ===
Nominated

- Apsara Award for Best Music - Pritam
- Apsara Award for Best Performance in a Negative Role - Arjan Bajwa

=== 3rd Mirchi Music Awards ===
Nominated

- Best Programmer & Arranger of the Year - Jim Satya, Johan Folke and DJ Phukan - "Mere Bina"

== See also ==
- List of Hindi films of 2010
- Indian Australians
- Australia–India relations
- Anti-Indian sentiment
- Racism in Australia
