= Anglophile =

Someone with a strong interest in or love of English people, culture, and history

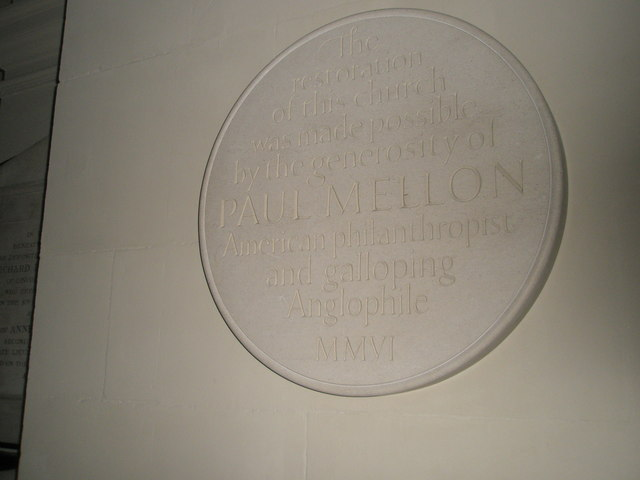
A plaque in St George's, Bloomsbury, dedicated to the American philanthropist Paul Mellon, a noted Anglophile

An Anglophile is a person who admires or loves England, its people, its culture, its language or its various accents.

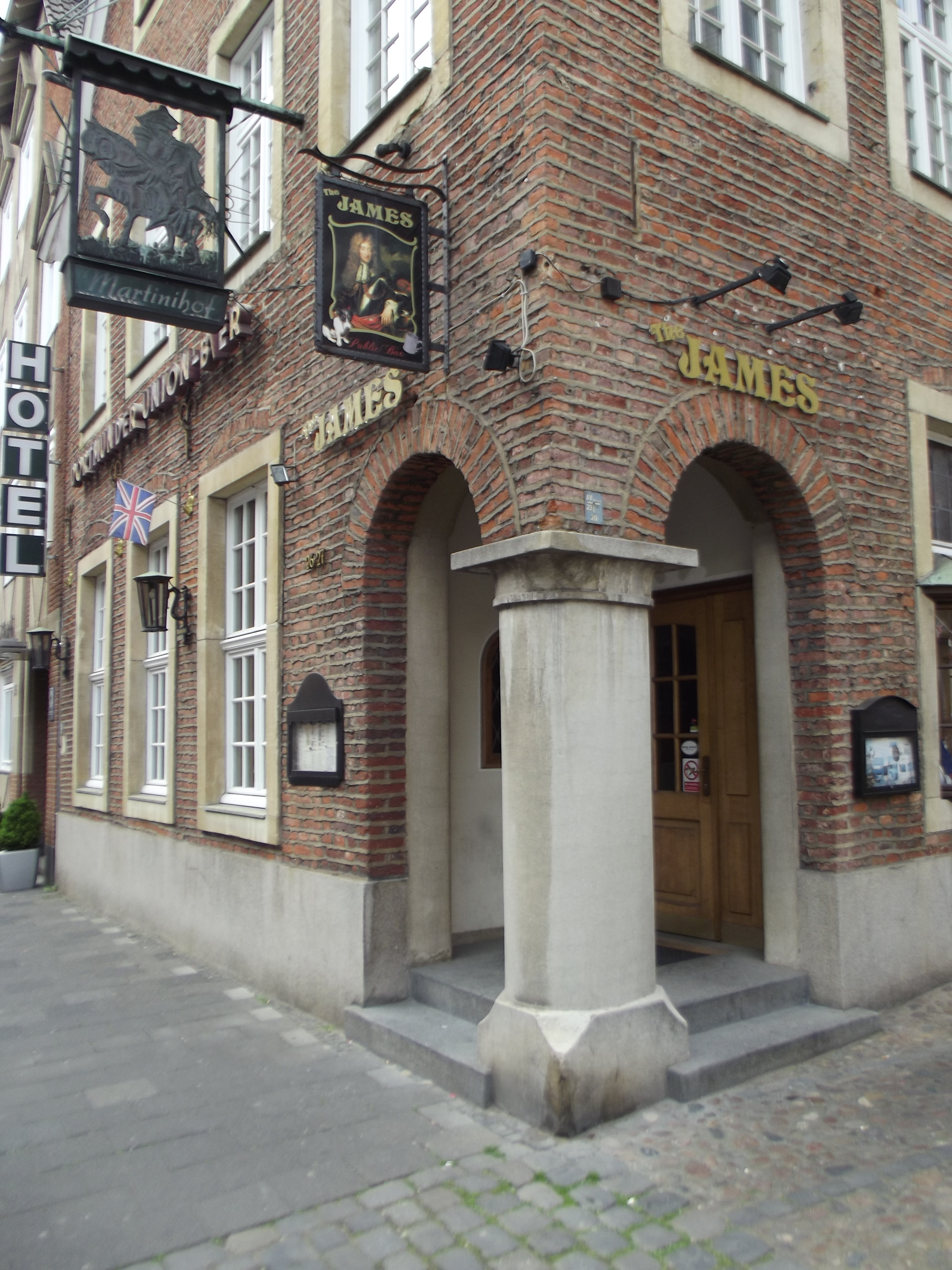
The James, an English-style pub in Münster, sporting the British flag and the sign of James II

In some cases Anglophilia refers to an individual's appreciation of English history and traditional English cultural figures such as William Shakespeare, Jane Austen, Samuel Johnson and Gilbert and Sullivan. Anglophilia may also be characterised by a fondness for the British monarchy, its system of government, and other institutions such as Royal Mail, as well as nostalgia for the former British Empire and the English class system. Anglophiles may enjoy English actors, actresses, sport, authors, cars, comedians, fashion, films, magazines, motorcycles, musicians, radio, subcultures, television series and traditions.

Anglophiles may use British English instead of American English, for example writing "colour" instead of "color", "centre" instead of "center" and "traveller" instead of "traveler". In 2012 BBC News Online and The New York Times reported that the United States had recently experienced a notable increase in the use of British English expressions in casual conversation and news reports. The trend, misunderstanding and misuse of these expressions by Americans has become a topic of media interest in the US and the UK. Ben Yagoda, a professor of English at the University of Delaware, stated that the use of British English has "established itself as this linguistic phenomenon that shows no sign of abating". Lynne Murphy, a linguist at the University of Sussex, noted that the trend is more pronounced in the Northeastern United States.

== Etymology ==
The word is derived from the Latin word Anglii and Ancient Greek word φίλος philos, meaning "friend". Its antonym is Anglophobe.

One of the earliest instances of the word "Anglophile" was recorded in December 1864 when Charles Dickens wrote in an edition of his weekly magazine All the Year Round that he viewed the French monthly magazine Revue des deux Mondes as "an advanced and somewhat 'Anglophile' publication".

== History ==
=== Anglomanie ===
Around 1722, the French philosopher Voltaire became an Anglophile, having lived in Britain between 1726 and 1728. He learnt English and expressed admiration for Britain as a land where, unlike his homeland, censorship was loose, one could freely express one's views, and business was considered a respectable occupation. Voltaire expressed his Anglophilia in his Letters Concerning the English Nation, a book first written in English and published in London in 1733, where he lavished much praise on British empiricism as a better way of thinking. The French version, Lettres philosophiques, was banned in 1734 for being anti-clerical, after complaints from the Roman Catholic Church; the book was publicly burned in Paris, and the only bookseller willing to sell it was sent to the Bastille. However, underground copies of the Lettres philosophiques were printed by an illegal print-shop in Rouen and the book was a huge bestseller in France, sparking a wave of what the French soon called Anglomanie.

The Lettres philosophiques first introduced the French to British writers and thinkers such as Jonathan Swift, Isaac Newton and William Shakespeare, who before then had been barely known in France. The success of Lettres philosophiques and the resulting wave of Anglomanie made all things English the rage in France, with English food, English styles and English gardens being especially popular. Ultimately, the popularity of Anglomanie led to a backlash, with H. L. Fougeret de Monbron publishing Préservatif contre l'anglomanie (The Antidote to Anglomania) in 1757, in which he argued for the superiority of French culture and attacked British democracy as mere "mobocracy".

=== Shakespearomanie ===
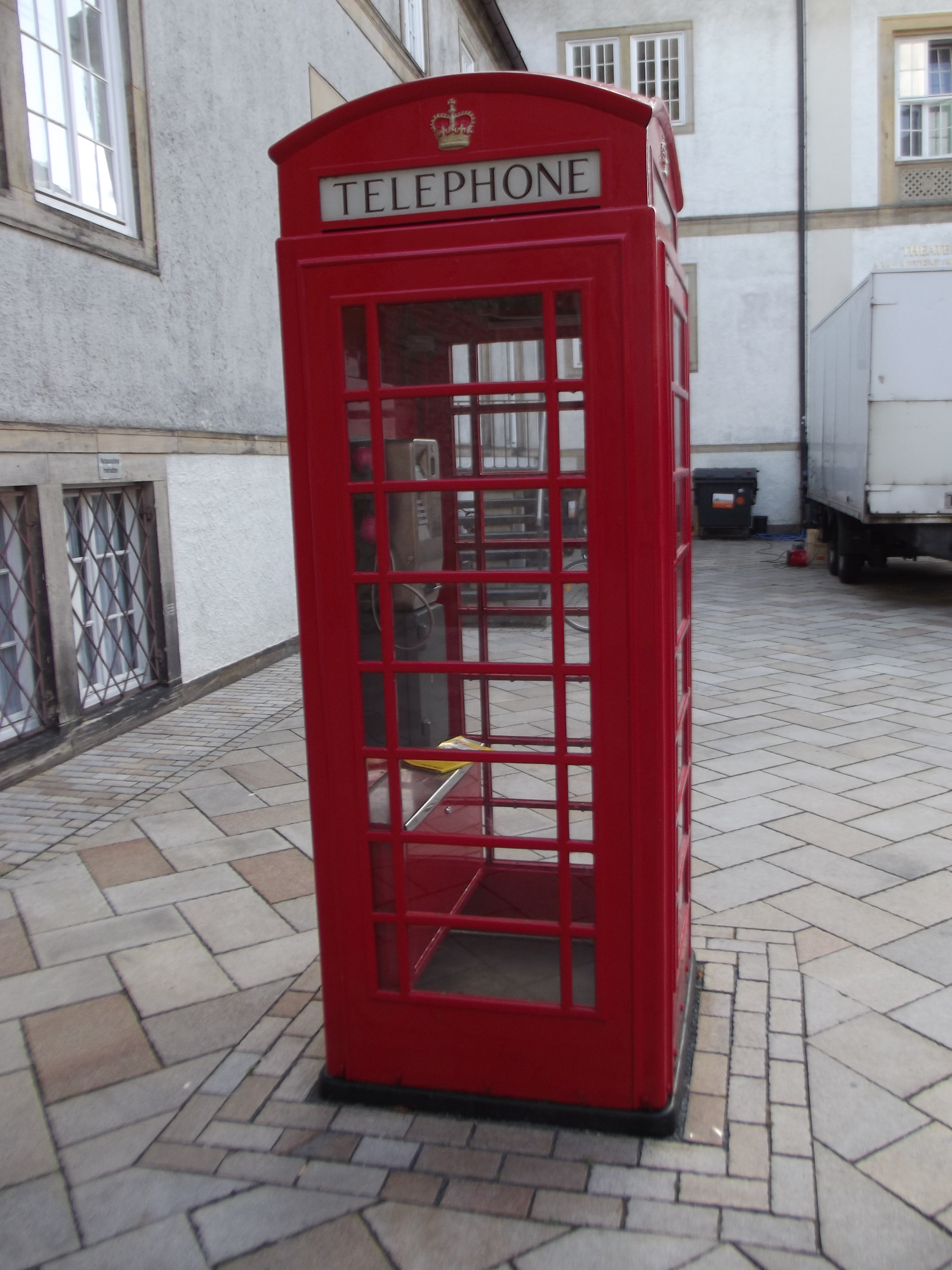
A German phone box in Bielefeld, designed as a homage to the traditional British phone box

Anglophilia became popular in the German states in the late 18th and early 19th centuries, with the German public being especially attracted to the work of Shakespeare, a phenomenon known in Germany as Shakespearomanie. In 1807 August Wilhelm Schlegel translated all of Shakespeare's plays into German, and such was the popularity of Schlegel's translation that German nationalists were soon starting to claim that Shakespeare was actually a German playwright who wrote his plays in English. English actors had been visiting the Holy Roman Empire since the late 16th century to work as "fiddlers, singers and jugglers", and through them the work of Shakespeare had first become known in the Reich. The writer Johann Wolfgang von Goethe called the plays of Shakespeare "a huge, animated fair", which he attributed to his Englishness, writing: "Everywhere in England – surrounded by the seas, enveloped in fog and clouds, active in all parts of the world".

In the 18th century Reich, the Francophile German critics preferred the rules of French classical theatre which rigidly set precise rules of unities of time and place, and saw Shakespeare's work as a "jumble". In a speech delivered in Frankfurt on 14 October 1771 Goethe praised Shakespeare for liberating his mind from the rigid French rules, saying: "I jumped into the free air, and suddenly felt I had hands and feet...Shakespeare, my friend, if you were with us today, I could only live with you". In 1995, The New York Times observed: "Shakespeare is an all-but-guaranteed success in Germany, where his work has enjoyed immense popularity for more than 200 years. By some estimates, Shakespeare's plays are performed more frequently in Germany than anywhere else in the world, not excluding his native England. The market for his work, both in English and in German translation, seems inexhaustible."

In its turn, the German obsession with Shakespeare made Anglophilia very popular, with the English being praised for their "spontaneous" nature, which allowed people to be themselves. The Osnabrück historian Justus Möser wrote that England was everything that a unified Germany should be, as Britain was a land of "organic" natural order where the aristocracy respected the liberties of the people and had a sense of duty to the nation.

=== "The Perfect Gentlemen" ===
In 19th-century France, Anglophilia was popular in certain elements but not with the French people in general. The reactionary Catholic royalist intellectual Charles Maurras took a virulently-Anglophobic viewpoint of Britain being the "cancer" of the world that made everything good rot, especially in his beloved France. However, the conservative French art historian and critic Hippolyte Taine was an Anglophile who greatly admired Britain as the land of "civilised" aristocratic order that at the same time embraced freedom and "self-government". In his youth, Taine had felt oppressed by the Catholic Church in which he had been brought up by his teachers at his lycée. He complained that they had treated him as "a horse between the shafts of a cart".

However, Taine distrusted the masses, saw the French Revolution as the sort of disaster caused when the mindless masses were given power and stated that giving everyone the right to vote would be like making every sailor the captain on a ship. For Taine, Britain embodied his ideal political system and combined the best features of both order and freedom. The state had limited powers, but the people instinctively deferred to the elite. For Taine, the essence of la grande idée anglaise (the great English idea) was "the persuasion that man was above all a free and moral person". Taine attributed that to the "Hebraic" spirit of the British people, which he saw as reflecting the influence of Protestantism, especially the Church of England, which Taine greatly admired. Taine argued that because the Protestant British had to justify themselves before God, they had to create moral rules that applied not only to others but also to themselves, which created a culture of self-restraint. Taine had a low opinion of ordinary British people, but he very much respected the gentlemen he met on his British trips, whom he praised for their moral qualities.

Taine noted with some jealousy that in France the term gentilhomme referred only to a man known for his sense of style and elegance and did not refer to the man's moral qualities. In France, there was no equivalent to the idea of a British gentleman. Taine noted that the difference between the French gentilhomme and the British gentleman was that the latter not only possessed the refinement and elegance expected of the gentilhomme but also more importantly had a sense of fundamental decency and honour that prevented him from doing anything dishonourable. Taine believed that the reason that the British but not the French could produce gentlemen to rule their nation was that the British nobility was meritocratic and always open to those whose talents had been allowed to rise up, but the French nobility was exclusive and very reactionary. Taine further admired the public schools like Harrow, Eton and Rugby for their ability to mould young men into gentlemen, but he found aspects of the public schools like flogging and fagging to be barbaric.

A Frenchman who was very much influenced by Taine's Anglophilia was Baron Pierre de Coubertin, who, after reading Taine's Notes on England, wanted to establish schools to produce gentlemen in France. Coubertin was convinced that the stress laid on sports in English public schools was the key to producing gentlemen and that young Frenchmen needed to play sports more often to learn how to be gentlemen. Coubertin was especially fascinated by the emphasis given to sports at Rugby School, which he keenly studied. Coubertin believed that Britain was the most successful nation in the world, as reflected by its worldwide empire, and that if only the French had been more like the British, the French would never have been defeated by the Germans in the Franco-Prussian War. Like Taine, Coubertin admired the inequality of the British educational system by noting with approval that only well-off families could afford to send their sons to the public schools: "Let us renounce that dangerous pipedream of an equal education for all and follow the example of the [British] people who understand so well the difference between democracy and equality!"

After reading Tom Brown's School Days, a novel that Coubertin loved, and Thomas Arnold's essays, Coubertin believed that a regime of regular boxing, rowing, cricket and football as practised at the British public schools would create gentlemen and "muscular Christians" in France in what Coubertin admiringly called the régime Arnoldien (Arnoldian regime). Coubertin wrote that based on reading Tom Brown's School Days, boxing was the "natural and English way for English boys to settle their quarrels". He also stated, "Putting a solid pair of fists in the service of God is a condition for serving Him well".

After meeting William Ewart Gladstone in 1888, Coubertin asked him whether he agreed with the statement that the renaissance britannique (British renaissance) was caused by Arnold's educational reforms. The thesis astonished Gladstone, who told Coubertin: "Your point of view is quite new, but...it is right".

In 1890 Coubertin attended the Wenlock Olympian Games organised by Dr William Penny Brookes, whom Coubertin called "an English doctor from an earlier age, romantic and practical at the same time". Coubertin was enchanted by the games held in the village of Much Wenlock, in rural Shropshire, and said that was possible only in England. Coubertin loved the English countryside and was impressed by the way in which the villagers were proud to be both from Shropshire and from Britain: "The Anglo-Saxon race alone has succeeded in keeping up the two feelings [love of the nation and one's region] and in strengthening the one through the other".

The Much Wenlock games, held in conscious imitation of the Olympics in ancient Greece, inspired Coubertin to organise the first modern Olympics in Athens in 1896.

=== "The Eastern Question": Anglophilia in The Balkans ===
Between the 14th to the 17th centuries, the Balkans region of Europe was conquered by the Ottoman Empire. In the 19th century, various Orthodox peoples such as the Greeks, Bulgarians and Serbs, charging that they were being oppressed by the Muslim Ottomans fought wars of independence. The British policy towards the "Eastern Question" and the Balkans, in particular, oscillated between a fear that the decline of Ottoman power would allow Britain's archenemy, Russia, to fill the void in the Balkans and the Near East and a humanitarian concern for Christian peoples oppressed by the Ottomans.

==== Bulgaria ====
In 1876, an uprising in Bulgaria was harshly repressed with the Ottoman state unleashing the much-feared Bashi-bazouks to wage a campaign of plundering, murder, rape and enslavement against the Bulgarians, and 15,000 Bulgarian civilians in a series of massacres that shocked the West. The Conservative government under Prime Minister Benjamin Disraeli, which saw the Ottoman Empire as a bulwark against Russia sought to deny the so-called "Bulgarian horrors" under the grounds of realpolitik. By contrast, the Liberal leader, William Ewart Gladstone came out energetically in support of the Balkan peoples living under Ottoman rule, publicised the "Bulgarian horrors" in his famous 1876 pamphlet The Bulgarian Horrors and the Question of the East, and demanded that Britain support independence for all of Balkan peoples on humanitarian grounds. Even though the government under Disraeli supported the Ottomans, Gladstone's campaign to publicise the gross human-rights abuses committed by the Ottomans and support for Balkan independence movements not only made him extremely popular in the Balkans, but led to a wave of Anglophilia amongst certain Balkan Christians, who admired Britain as a land capable of producing someone like Gladstone.

Anglophilia was rare in the Balkans in the 19th century as Balkan Muslims looked towards the Ottoman Empire while Balkan Christians generally looked towards France or Russia for inspiration. Gladstone saw himself as the defender of human rights which led him in 1890 to criticise anti-Chinese laws in Australia under the grounds that Chinese immigrants were being penalised for their virtues like the willingness to work hard rather than any supposed vices. In the same way, Gladstone perceived himself as the champion of the rights of small nations, which led to support "Home Rule" for Ireland (i.e. devolving power from Westminster to an Irish parliament). The same principles that led Gladstone to support Home Rule for the Irish and the rights of Chinese immigrants in Australia made him very sympathetic to the Balkan peoples.

Balkan Anglophiles such as Vladimir Jovanović and Čedomilj Mijatović in Serbia; Ioannes Gennadius and Eleutherios Venizelos in Greece and Ivan Evstratiev Geshov in Bulgaria were all inclined to admire British liberalism, especially of the Gladstonian type. Furthermore, all five of the above-named men saw Britain as an example of a liberal power, which had successfully created institutions that were meant to serve the individual rather the state, which inspired them with institution-building in their own newly independent nations. Finally, though Venizelos, Geshov, Jovanović Gennadius, and Mijatović were all nationalists, by the standards of the Balkans they were tolerant nationalists who admired the United Kingdom as a state which had brought the English, the Scots, the Welsh and the Irish living together in peace and harmony in one kingdom (the precise accuracy of that view is beside the point since that was how the British was viewed in the Balkans), which they saw British unionism as an example for their own multi-ethnic nations.

==== Serbia ====
An early Anglophile Serb was the writer, philosopher, translator and the first education minister Dositej Obradović. He was the first person in Serbia's modern history to connect the two cultures.

Jovanović was a Serbian economist and politician of marked liberal views who was much influenced by John Stuart Mill's 1859 book On Liberty and by Gladstone, taking the viewpoint that Britain should be the model for the modernisation of Serbia, which had emerged as a de facto independent state in 1817 after being under Ottoman rule since 1389. In 1863, Jovanović published in London the English-language pamphlet The Serbian Nation and the Eastern Question in which he sought to prove the parallels between British and Serbian histories with the emphasis on the struggle for freedom as the defining feature of both nations' history. After his return to Serbia, Vladimir Jovanović gave a lecture in Belgrade that stated: “Let us take a look at England whose name is so famed. Fortunate circumstances have made her a country where general progress of humanity has been achieved in the best way. There is no known truth or science that has not enriched popular consciousness in England... In a word, all conditions for progress that are known today are there in England."

The diplomat, economist and politician Čedomilj Mijatović became an Anglophile after marrying a British woman, Elodie Lawton, in 1864. In 1884 to 1886, 1895 to 1900 and 1902– to 1903, Mijatović was the Serbian minister in London, and he became much involved in cultural activities there and liked Britain so much he lived in London from 1889 to his death in 1932. He was the most prolific translator of British books into Serbo-Croatian and wrote six books in English. Mijatović believed that Britain had much to teach Serbia and preferred to translate books into Serbo-Croatian that promoted liberal values. Such was Mijatović's liberalism that when he attended the Hague Peace Conference in 1899 representing Serbia, he attempted to have the delegates representing the Asian states serve as the vice-presidents of the various sections of the conference to provide for a degree of equality between the Europeans and the Asians. His proposal was roundly rejected. In 1912, Mijatović attributed his cosmopolitan liberalism to living in London and wrote to a friend in Serbia, "I am an old man indeed, but it seems that there have never been in my heart livelier and more generous sympathies not only for the interests and progress of our Serbia, but also for the interests and progress of the world. In London a man cannot but feel like 'a citizen of the world', cannot fail to see higher, broader and wider horizons". Like many other Balkan Anglophiles, Mijatović wished for a union between the Eastern Orthodox and Anglican Churches, and in his politics, he was much influenced by Gladstone. Mijatović also wrote twenty novels in Serbian, all of them historical novels inspired by Mijatović's favourite writer, Sir Walter Scott.

The writer and politician Geshov first started learning English at the age of 14 and at the age of 16, moved to Manchester and was later subsequently educated at Owen College. During his time in Britain, Geshov recalled: "I was influenced by English political and social life amidst which I was developing. And what especially remained in my mind were thoughts and works of John Stuart Mill." In 1885, Serbia attacked Bulgaria and was defeated. Geshov negotiated the peace treaty with his fellow Anglophile Mijatović, which the latter to recall in his memoirs: "Bulgaria’s delegate Ivan Geshov, and myself, cherishing admiration for the British people and their ways, entered at once into friendly relations". Strongly influenced by Mill, Geshov was an advocate of liberalism in the newly independent Bulgaria and spoke out in favour of social and political reforms. In 1911, the Anglophile Geshov who became the Bulgarian Prime Minister started secret talks with Greek Prime Minister Venizelos, an Anglophile, for a Balkan League that would drive the Ottomans out of the Balkans once and for all. In the ensuring First Balkan War of 1912–13, the Balkan League of Serbia, Bulgaria, Greece and Montenegro proceeded to inflict a series of defeats on the Ottomans in the fall of 1912 that drove the Ottomans almost entirely out of the Balkans.

==== Greece ====
Gennadius was a wealthy Greek and a famous bibliophile educated at the English Protestant College in Malta who moved to London in 1863 at the age of 19 where he worked as a journalist for a liberal newspaper, The Morning Star. After the Dilessi murders in which a group of British aristocrats was murdered by Greek bandits, which led to an outbreak of Greek-bashing in Britain, Gennadius published a pamphlet Notes on the Recent Murders by Brigands in Greece in which he defended the Greek people from the charges made in the British press that all Greeks were thugs. From 1875 to 1880, Gennadius worked at the Greek legation in London, where he gave a speech in 1878: "It finds in us echo all the more ready as the two nations, great Britain and little Greece, have both attained to the highest position amongst the people of the earth, at different epochs, it is true, but by the identical pursuits of commerce and the same love of civilisation and progress." Gennadius served several terms as Greek minister in London, married a British woman in 1904 worked hard to improve intellectual ties between Greece and Britain, and helped to found the Society of Hellenic Studies in London and the British School of Archeology in Athens. Reflecting his Anglophilia, Gennadius supported ecumenism, tried to effect a union between the Eastern Orthodox Churches and the Church of England and donated his huge collection of 24,000 British books to the Greek people in a library named after his father, the Gennadeion.

Venizelos was a Greek liberal politician who served as Greek Prime Minister several times between 1910 and 1933. During the First World War, Venizelos tried to bring Greece into the war on the Allied side, causing a clash with the Germanophile King Constantine I and hence leading to the National Schism between supporters of the King and the Prime Minister. In 1915, Venizelos stated in an interview with a British journalist, "Whatever happens within the next few critical weeks, let England never forget that Greece is with her, heart and soul, remembering her past acts of friendship in times of no less difficulty, and looking forward to abiding union in days to come". Venizelos's willingness to defy the King and to have Greece fight on the Allied state was partly because of his Anglophilia, as he genuinely believed that Britain had much to teach the Greeks. That led him to help found the Anglo-Hellenic Educational Foundation in 1918. He believed that an alliance with the British would allow the Greeks to finally achieve the Megali Idea (the "Great Idea") of bringing the Greeks of Anatolia under Ottoman rule into Greece.

=== In Hungary ===
Anglophilia became a notable cultural and political tendency among sections of the Hungarian aristocracy and reform-minded elite from the late eighteenth century and especially during the Reform Era. Members of the Hungarian nobility increasingly travelled to Britain, where many studied its political institutions, economy and agricultural practices, while English models influenced areas ranging from estate design and leisure culture to economic and institutional reform. The English landscape garden (angolkert) became fashionable among aristocratic estates (such as in Dég, Alcsút, Tata, Kismarton, Vácrátót) while English-style sports and associations, especially horse racing and gentlemen's clubs, were adopted by members of the elite.

The political dimension of Hungarian Anglophilia was particularly associated with István Széchenyi, who advocated adapting British examples to Hungarian conditions in his works Hitel, Világ and Stádium. Széchenyi promoted institutions and initiatives influenced by British models, including the National Casino, modern transport infrastructure (Chain Bridge, Óbuda Shipyard), and the development of horse breeding and racing. Hungarian reformers admired Britain not only for its economic strength but also for its constitutional monarchy, aristocratic political culture, and gradual approach to reform.

=== Die Swingjugend and les Zazous ===
In late-1930s Germany, a youth counter-culture emerged of the so-called die Swingjugend ("The Swing Youth"), a group of German teenagers who disliked the Hitler Youth and the League of German Girls, but who liked to meet and dance to the latest "English music" (which was usually American swing and jazz music), which was illegal at the time. The "Swing Youth" usually came from middle-class families in northern Germany. Hamburg, the most Anglophile of German cities, was regarded as the "capital" of the "Swing Youth" movement. The "Swing Youth" were Anglophiles who preferred to dress in the "English style", with the boys wearing checkered coats and homburg hats, carrying umbrellas, and smoking pipes, while the girls wore their hair curled and applied much make-up. In the Third Reich, the "natural look" with no make-up and braided hair was the preferred style for women, so the "swing babies", as female "Swing Youth" were called, were rejecting what their regime had prescribed for them. Reflecting their Anglophilia, the "Swing Youth" often preferred to talk and write to each other in English (English together with French were languages widely taught in Gymnasium since the early 20th century).

For the first five years of the Third Reich, Nazi propaganda had been favourable to Britain, as Hitler had hoped for an Anglo-German alliance, but in 1938, when it became clear that Britain was not going to ally with Germany, the propaganda of the regime turned fiercely Anglophobic: a major British-bashing campaign was launched in the autumn of 1938. In this light, the Anglophilia of the Swing Youth could be seen as an implicit rejection of the regime. Likewise, the "Swing Youth" tended to welcome Jewish and Mischlinge ("mixed race") teenagers who wanted to join their gatherings. The German musicologist Guido Fackler described the Swingjugend embracing of American music and the "English style" as follows: "The Swingjugend rejected the Nazi state, above all because of its ideology and uniformity, its militarism, the "Führer principle" and the leveling Volksgemeinschaft (people's community). They experienced a massive restriction of their personal freedom. They rebelled against all this with jazz and swing, which stood for a love of life, self-determination, non-conformism, freedom, independence, liberalism, and internationalism."

Despite the British declaration of war on Germany on 3 September 1939, the "Swing Youth" continued to adopt the "English style", which led to the Nazi regime cracking down on the "Swing Youth": in one raid in 1941 in Hamburg, about 300 "Swing Kids" were arrested. At least seventy of the "Swing Youth", considered to be leaders of the movement, were sent to concentration camps. The "Swing Youth" movement was not overtly political, though it rejected aspects of Nazi ideology, but the persecution of the "Swing Youth" led to some taking a more anti-Nazi stance. Very similar to the Swing Youth were the Zazou movement in France who preferred to dress in the style anglais with umbrellas (seen as a symbol of Britishness in France) a popular fashion accessory and their hair done up à la mode d'Oxford, liked to speak to each other in English as it was "cooler", and like their German counterparts loved British and American popular music. The French writer Simone de Beauvoir described the Zazou look as "the young men wore dirty drape suits with 'drainpipe' trousers under their sheep-skinned lined jackets and liberally brillianted their long hair, the girls favoured tight roll-collar jumpers with short flared skirts and wooden platform shoes, sported dark glasses with big lenses, put on heavy make-up and went bare-headed to show their dyed hair, set off by a lock of different hue".

=== In Eastern Asia ===
Among the Karen people of Burma who were converted to Christianity by British missionaries in the 19th century and had long felt oppressed by the militaristic Burmese state, Anglophilia is very common. Likewise with the Shan people: starting in the 1880s the sons of the Shan elite were educated at the British-style boarding school at Taunggyi and at universities in Britain, which resulted in much of the Shan elite becoming Anglophiles who treasured British culture as if it were their own. The Karens fought with the British during all three Burmese Wars and during the Second World War, they resisted the Pan-Asian propaganda of the Japanese, who called on all Asians to unite under Japan's leadership. The Karens stayed loyal to the British and waged a guerilla war against the Japanese. One Karen veteran of the war explained in a 2009 interview that he had resisted the Pan-Asian propaganda of the Japanese because he was Karen, a group just like the Shan and the Mon that "really liked" the British and preferred to fight under alliances. The veteran stated that as a Karen, he had to stay loyal to the British Crown.

As late as 1981, much of the elite Karen leadership was described as "Anglophile". In the Shan states which have been unhappily part of Burma since 1948, one Shan man, Sengjoe (most Shans have only one name) told American journalist Christopher Cox (in slightly broken English) that most Shan were nostalgic for the British Empire: "The Shan people enjoyed peace and prosperity during the British rule, in the colonization days. Still the old people mention it with tears. We remember the old days while the British were ruling. It was the best. We have peace. We have tranquility. After independence, we have all the miseries placed by the Bamars." Sengjoe only faulted the British for not granting the Shan independence in 1948 by granting independence to Burma, with the Shan being included in the newly independent Burma very much against their will.

Sangjoe complained that the Shan had stayed loyal to the British the Second World War and waged a guerrilla struggle against the Japanese, but the Bamars had collaborated with the Japanese. Sengjoe accused the British of betraying the Shan by including them in Burma, a state dominated by chauvinist Bamar nationalists, who had all been willing collaborators with the Japanese and wanted to wreak vengeance against those had fought against them in the war.

=== In Brazil ===
The Brazilian writer Gilberto Freyre was a well known Anglophile. Freyre was greatly influenced by the 19th-British Romantic and Victorian writers, especially the work of Thomas Carlyle, John Ruskin and Herbert Spencer. Freyre came from northeastern Brazil, which had been under strong British economic influence in the 19th century. Like many other Brazilians from the region, Freyre had come to associate Britain with modernity and progress, a viewpoint that Freyre expressed most notably in his 1948 book Ingleses no Brasil. In promoting his theory of Lusotropicalism in which miscegenation was presented as a positive good for Brazil, Freyre was influenced by his view of the British Empire as a multiethnic multiracial society that had all sorts of different peoples of various languages, ethnicities, races and religions united together in peace and harmony around a common loyalty to the British Crown. Freyre argued that just as the British Empire had united white, brown, black and Asian peoples together, Brazil should be a place that would bring together the descendants of the Indians, African slaves and immigrants from Europe and Asia. Freyre often wrote essays on British personalities ranging from Florence Nightingale to Winston Churchill and particularly used his essays to promote British and Irish writers such as Sir Walter Scott, George Meredith, William Butler Yeats and James Joyce, all of whom were then unknown to the Brazilian public.

Starting out as a leftist, Freyre hailed the British Labour Party's victory in the 1945 election as the "socialist democratic revolution in Great Britain" that was a turning point in world history. Freyre confidently predicted that it would soon create a humane welfare state, which would be emulated by the rest of the world.

Freyre's Anglophilia was of a distinctly left-wing type. He often praised the "great tradition of English socialism"; called Sir Stafford Cripps, the leader of Labour's left-wing faction, Britain's most original politician and dismissed Churchill as an "archaic" reactionary.

Brazilian intellectual figure Plinio Corrêa de Oliveira was another well-known Anglophile however his Anglophilia was unlike that of Freyre. Oliveira's Anglophilia was rooted in the conservative tradition, akin to that of Hippolyte Taine. His highest expression of this is in his short letter, 'Vocations of the European Peoples'.

By contrast, Brazilian conservative figures such as ex-president Jair Bolsonaro have hailed wartime British Prime Minister Winston Churchill as an influence on their political career.

=== American Janeites ===
The British cultural critic Robert P. Irvine has argued that the popularity of the novels of Jane Austen, and even more so the film adaptations of her novels, have formed part of the "cultural capital" of the "white, Anglophile East Coast elite" in the United States since the late 19th century. In this regard, Irvine quoted the remark by the American cultural critic Lionel Trilling in his 1957 essay "On Emma" that: "not to like Jane Austen is to put oneself under the suspicion...of a want of breeding". Irvine argued that Americans cannot embrace entirely the ordered, hierarchical society of Regency Britain depicted by Austen as it runs directly against the egalitarian creed of the United States, but at the same time such a world offers a certain appeal to elements in the United States, who find in that world a certain style, class, elegance and a depth of feeling lacking in their own. The world portrayed by Austen was a world with clearly defined social norms and expectations for proper behavior, especially as relating to relations between the sexes where the men are gentlemen and the women are ladies, which many Americans find appealing. In a hyper-sexualised culture where boorishness is often prized and gender roles have been in flux since the 1960s, certain Americans find Austen's world with its clearly demarcated gender roles and emphasis on genteel behaviour a more appealing alternative.

Irvine argued for a long time that many Americans had a nostalgia for the ordered society that existed in the South prior to the Civil War, as manifested in the popularity of the novel and film versions of Gone With The Wind, but that as that society was based on slavery, expressing nostalgia for the old South has been unfashionable since the civil rights movement of the 1950s–60s. As such, Irvine argued that film adaptations of Austen novels offered the best compensation for Americans who have a nostalgia for an ordered society, since the memory of Regency Britain does not carry the loaded offensive political and racial connotations that the memory of the old South does. Irvine argued that unlike in Britain, the popularity of Austen films in America, which started in the 1990s, is seen as part of a "conservative cultural agenda", as admiration of Austen is regarded as a part of the "cultural capital" of American elites. However, Irvine argued that one should not be too quick to attribute the popularity of Austen in America to an "implicitly racist Anglophilia".

Instead, Irvine argued that the popularity of Austen films in America was due to the emergence of an ordered society, not based on land and birth as in the novels, but based on a "hierarchy of leisure and consumption", where class is "status conferred by money", in short a society much like the modern United States. Irvine argued that Americans generally do not like discussing the subject of class, as it suggests that the United States is not entirely living up to its egalitarian, meritocratic ideals, and in this respect, Austen films depict a world defined by class positively, while at the same time being specifically foreign enough and far away enough in time to offer no commentary on modern America. Finally Irvine argued that the popularity of Austen films was due to their depiction of an ordered society where the chief problems faced by the characters are those relating to romantic love and where everything ends happily.

Noting that Janeites (as fans of Austen are known) tend to be women, Irvine commented that Austen films starting with the 1995 adaptation of Pride and Prejudice have with remarkable consistency "cater[ed] to female desires and the female gaze" by depicting handsome actors wearing tight-fitting clothing and breeches in an "era when men could still be the locus of the beautiful". Irvine maintained that Austen films are meant to please female viewers by depicting the male body in a way normally associated with the female body and male viewers. Irvine wrote that the appeal of characters like Mr. Darcy is that of "absolute and unconditioned male need for a woman", which many women on both sides of the Atlantic find very attractive. Finally, Irvine argued that a major part of the appeal of Austen is that her stories feature heroines living in a patriarchal society where the chief purpose of women is to be wives and mothers (thus making a woman's worth mainly dependent on her marriageability) who have to navigate complex social rules to assert themselves and marry the right man: stories that women find as relevant today as in the 19th century.

=== Hong Kong ===
Following the handover of Hong Kong in mid of 1990s, foreign journalists and reporters have found that many older generation Hongkongers continue to display Anglophilia and British loyalist sentiments, which stem either from nostalgia for the British colonial period or a perception that British rule was in retrospect preferable to increased subjugation from mainland China, as well as a desire to maintain sovereignty and a distinct identity from that of Beijing. Barrister and pro-democracy politician Martin Lee has been cited as an example of an Anglophile, as has social activist Grandma Wong who is known to wave a British flag at her protests and has expressed a fondness for the colonial period.

Social commentators have noted continued expressions of Anglophilia in millennial generation Hong Kong nationals who were either born after the handover or were too young to remember it, and that younger Hongkongers have displayed British symbolism at pro-democracy rallies in acts of opposition to the pro-Beijing camp and on social media by referring to themselves as British Hongkongers, or have a historical interest in past local British shaped culture in Hong Kong prior to the handover. Others, while not wanting a return to full British rule, have cited their appreciation for the fact Hong Kong basic law was derived from British (chiefly English) common law. Yeung Sum argued that the British colonial administration led to "well-established legal system and world-class social infrastructure" in Hong Kong which is still looked at fondly by some Hongkongers.

=== Kosovo ===
Following the Kosovo War, there were about 19,000 British soldiers in the Kosovo Force, which main mission is to provide security in the region. During a football match between England and Kosovo in November 2019, the streets in Pristina were filled with banners with the slogan "Welcome & Respect", in addition to raising the English flags and thankful messages.

== Notable Anglophiles ==
- Ben Affleck, American actor and filmmaker
- Gillian Anderson, American actress
- Esperanza Aguirre, Spanish politician
- Abubakar Tafawa Balewa, Nigerian Prime Minister
- Drew Barrymore, American actress
- Kate Bosworth, American actress
- Bill Bryson, American writer
- Tim Burton, American filmmaker
- Kim Cattrall, English-Canadian actress
- Tom Clancy, American writer
- George Clooney, American actor and filmmaker
- Brian Cox, Scottish actor
- Tom Cruise, American actor
- Johnny Depp, American actor and musician
- Cameron Diaz, American actress
- Jason Donovan, Australian actor and singer
- Drake, Canadian rapper
- Kirsten Dunst, American actress
- Albert Einstein, German scientist
- Douglas Fairbanks Jr., American actor
- Lady Gaga, American singer and musician
- John Paul Getty Jr., English-American philanthropist
- Andrew Gold, American singer and musician
- Maggie Grace, American actress
- John Grant, American singer and musician
- Maggie Gyllenhaal, American actress
- Jimi Hendrix, American singer and musician
- Charlton Heston, American actor
- Kate Hudson, American actress
- Angelina Jolie, American actress and filmmaker
- John F. Kennedy, 35th president of the United States
- John Krasinski, American actor and filmmaker
- Jennifer Lawrence, American actress
- Martin Lee, Hong Kong politician and barrister
- Lee Kuan Yew, Singaporean Prime Minister
- Jennifer Lopez, American singer
- Lorde, New Zealand singer
- Courtney Love, American singer and musician
- Elle Macpherson, Australian model
- Madonna, American singer and actress
- Rachel McAdams, Canadian actress
- Elizabeth McGovern, American actress
- Paul Mellon, American philanthropist
- Kylie Minogue, Australian singer and actress
- Mike Myers, Canadian actor and comedian
- Naruhito, Japanese Emperor
- Gwyneth Paltrow, American actress
- Katy Perry, American singer
- Brad Pitt, American actor
- Tunku Abdul Rahman, Malaysian Prime Minister
- Adam Richman, American presenter
- Rihanna, Barbadian singer
- David Schwimmer, American actor
- Garfield Sobers, Barbadian cricket player
- Kevin Spacey, American actor
- Britney Spears, American singer
- Gwen Stefani, American singer
- Kristen Stewart, American actress
- George Takei, American actor
- Quentin Tarantino, American filmmaker
- Corey Taylor, American singer
- Elizabeth Taylor, English-American actress
- Donald Trump, 45th and 47th president of the United States
- will.i.am, American rapper
- Hayley Williams, American singer
- H. P. Lovecraft, American writer

== See also ==
- Anglo-Saxons
- Anglophobia
- Australophile
- British Invasion
- Cool Britannia
- Culture of England
- Culture of the United Kingdom
- Special Relationship

== Bibliography ==
- Auerbach, Sascha (2009). Race, Law, and "The Chinese Puzzle" in Imperial Britain. London: Macmillan. doi:10.1057/9780230620926. ISBN 978-0-230-60949-5.
- Buruma, Ian (1998). Anglomania: A European Love Affair. New York: Random House.
- Markovich, Slobodan G. (2009). "Anglophiles in Balkan Christian States (1862–1920)". Balcanica (40): 95–145. doi:10.2298/BALC0940093M. hdl:21.15107/rcub_dais_4302.
