= Lynne Murphy =

American linguist

- Born: M. Lynne Murphy; 1965 (age 60–61)
- Occupation: Professor

Academic background
- Education: University of Massachusetts Amherst (BA); University of Illinois at Urbana–Champaign (AM, PhD)

Academic work
- Discipline: Linguist
- Sub-discipline: Lexicology
- Institutions: University of Sussex

M. Lynne Murphy (born 1965) is a professor of linguistics at the University of Sussex, England. She runs the blog Separated by a Common Language under the username Lynneguist and has written five books.

== Studies ==
Murphy has a B.A. in Linguistics and Philosophy from the University of Massachusetts Amherst, as well as an A.M. and PhD from the University of Illinois at Urbana–Champaign.

== Career ==
Murphy taught at the University of the Witwatersrand in South Africa and Baylor University in Texas. In 2000, she moved to England and began teaching at the University of Sussex where she became a professor. Her linguistic research specialises in semantics, in particular semantic relations.

She has written 5 books: Semantic Relations and the Lexicon, Key Terms in Semantics, Lexical Meaning, Antonyms in English, and The Prodigal Tongue.

Her book The Prodigal Tongue (for which she received a grant from the National Endowment for the Humanities), and her blog Separated by a Common Language, compare American English and British English.

In 2012, she gave a TEDx talk at the University of Sussex, and in 2016 spoke at the Boring Conference.

== Honors and awards ==
Murphy received a grant from the NEH Public Scholars Program for her most recent book, The Prodigal Tongue.

== Selected publications ==
=== Books ===
- M. Lynne Murphy. 2003. Semantic relations and the lexicon: antonymy, synonymy and other paradigms. Cambridge: Cambridge University Press.
- M. Lynne Murphy. 2010. Lexical meaning. Cambridge: Cambridge University Press.
- Lynne Murphy. 2018. The Prodigal Tongue: The Love-hate Relationship Between American and British English. Penguin.

=== Journal articles ===
- Steven Jones and M. Lynne Murphy. 2005. "Using corpora to investigate antonym acquisition," International Journal of Corpus Linguistics 10 (3), 401-422.
- Steven Jones, Carita Paradis, M Lynne Murphy, and Caroline Willners. 2007. "Googling for ‘opposites’: A Web-based study of antonym canonicity," Corpora 2 (2), 129-154.
- M. Lynne Murphy and Steven Jones, 2008. "Antonyms in children's and child-directed speech," First Language 28 (4), 403-430.
