= Federation of Indian Student Associations in Australia =

The Federation of Indian Student Associations (FISA) in Australia was incorporated in 2002 by Gautam Gupta after he was the victim of a drunken assault, which led to depression and his decision to start the federation. Since the Violence against Indians in Australia controversy began, the FISA has had a high profile in many Australian, Indian, and other international sources.

FISA's stated purpose is:

- Integration: To unify Indian students in Australia and integrate them with the Australian community.
- Representation: To partner at all levels of the Australian political and social spectrum to represent the views and opinions of Indian students.
- Empowerment: To increase the spiritual, political, social and economic strength of Indian students in Australia.

FISA's aims are;

- FISA to be recognised as a point of reference for Indian students nationally.
- To construct an effective and long-lasting communication network amongst students who are Indian by pedigree.
- The network would consist of all University Unions/Organisations and other like-minded associations, representative bodies and interested individuals.
- Organise events to provide a social interaction point for students.
- Increase dialogue between other community representative bodies to provide students with a perspective of multicultural Australia.
- FISA Executives consist of dynamic Indians and Australians from various cultures whose primary aim is to form a synthesis of multicultural society.
