= Anti-Australian sentiment =

Dislike of Australia, its people or its policies

Anti-Australian sentiment (also known as Australophobia or Anti-Australianism) refers to animosity, criticism, or prejudice towards Australia, its culture, or Australians in general. Anti-Australian sentiment can arise from various factors including differences in religion, events outlined in the History of Australia, its domestic or foreign policies or its involvement in various conflicts such as World War I or World War II.

The antonym for an Australophobe is an Australophile, which refers to the appreciation, love, or admiration for Australia.

== History ==
One of the earliest references to the specific phrase "Anti-Australian sentiment" occurred in 1883 in relation to the imperial British governments dismissal of concerns by Australian colonies over areas not annexed by Britain falling into control of foreign powers threatening the region. On 4 April 1883, the colony of Queensland annexed East New Guinea, and took possession of the whole Island with the exception of the portion occupied by the Dutch. The imperial British government disapproved of the annexation leading to accusations of "Anti-Australian sentiments". The German Empire established German New Guinea in part of the same area a year later in 1884 confirming these fears. In 1884, German newspaper Nord deutsche Zeitung, a newspaper that was closely aligned with and voiced the views of the Imperial German Government, published anti-Australian views and urged the French government to annoy Australian colonies by sending convicts in large numbers to the French territory of New Caledonia, playing on this fear.

The term "anti-Australian" also predates the specific phrase "Anti-Australian sentiment" by decades first being mentioned in the early 1800s in relation to the actions by the imperial British government in governing the Australian colonies and soon later about the views of the British public on Australian society and convicts. The 20th century saw a rise of the term used in relation to the White Australia policy. By 1949, people in parts of Africa and Asia were said to have "anti-Australian feeling" over how Australia applied its White Australia policy.

== By Country ==
=== Germany ===
==== German Empire ====
In 1884, German newspaper Norddeutsche Zeitung, urged the French government to send convicts in large numbers to the French territory of New Caledonia, to exploit concerns by Australian colonies over foreign powers threatening the region by annexing areas not under British control.

During World War I, anti-Australian sentiment arose from Australia's seizure of parts of the German colonial empire in the Pacific. The Australian Naval and Military Expeditionary Force seized German New Guinea, Bismarck Archipelago (New Britain, New Ireland and several smaller islands), North Solomon Islands and Nauru in 1914 leading to the German press portraying Australia as an aggressive, expansionist proxy of British imperialism and an opportunistic appropriator of German territory. This hostility is generalised as a part of a wider anti-British and anti-Allied sentiment, rather than a distinct German campaign focused specifically on Australia.

==== Nazi Germany ====
Nazi Germany during World War II portrayed Australians as uncivilised and radio broadcasts directed at Allied troops occasionally targeted Australian soldiers to undermine morale, framing them as fools dying for British imperial interests far from home. The most notable example was by the propagandist William Joyce, better known as "Lord Haw-Haw", who began describing Australians during the Siege of Tobruk as the "rats of Toburk."

=== East Timor ===
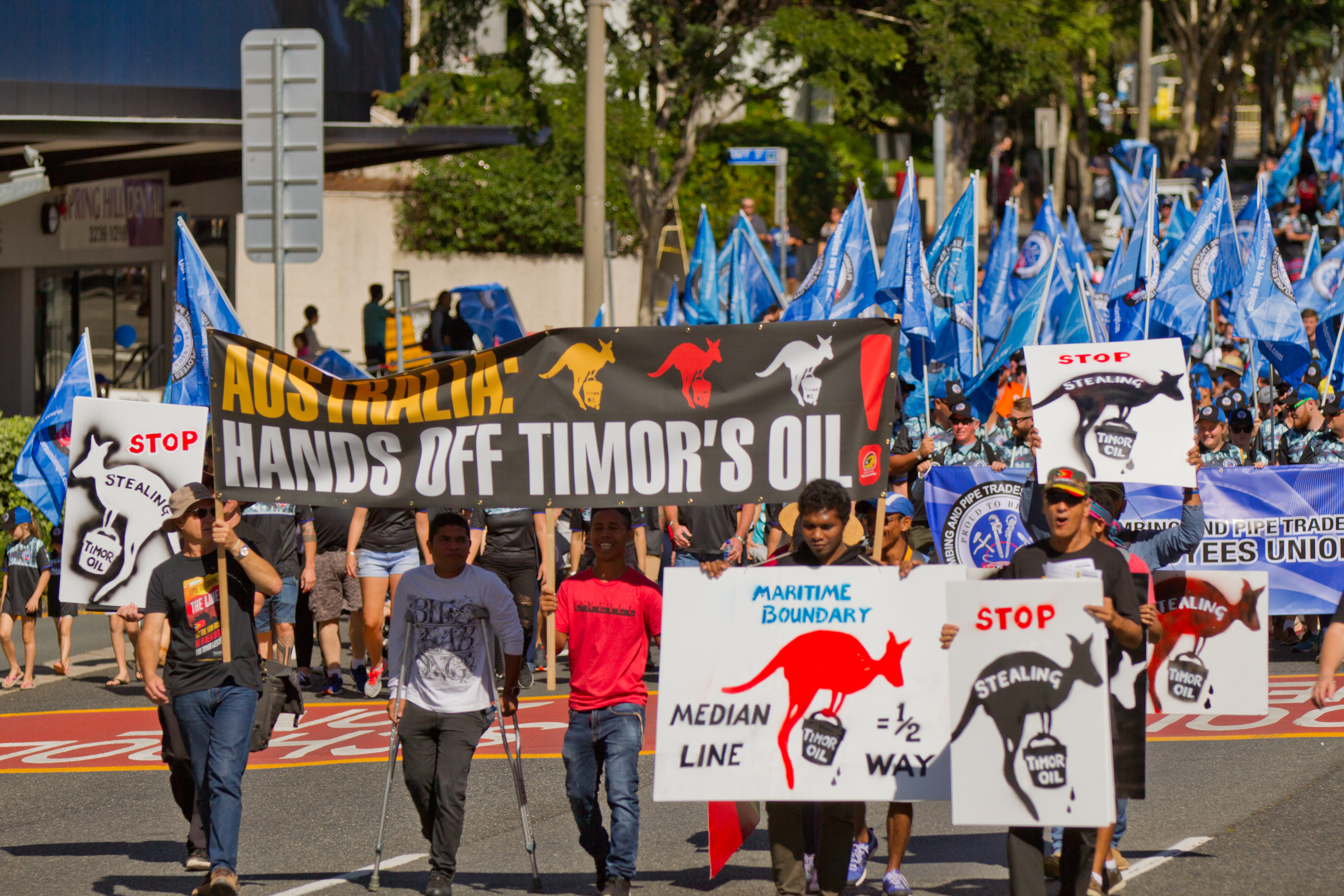
Protesters in Brisbane protesting Australia's claim on East Timorese oil, May 2017

Anti-Australian sentiment grew significantly within East Timor during the period of the Timor Gap Treaty which was signed during the Indonesian occupation of East Timor. The sentiment was further intensified by the political and economic issues between East Timor and Australia, following Timor-Leste's independence particularly over oil and gas resources within the Timor Sea, which sparked major protests and resulted in the Timor Sea Treaty. Negotiations were later exacerbated by the Australia–East Timor spying scandal.

=== Indonesia ===
Indonesia has been alleged to have a rise in "anti-Australian sentiment" because of suggestions of Australia interfering in its internal affairs. A 2003 study on Indonesian aspirants for a diplomatic position reported that 95% of them had anti-Australian sentiment. The post-Suharto era period also saw anti-Australian sentiment in Indonesia over East Timor. In Indonesia, it is related to a generalised anti-Western sentiment.

The Australian intervention in East Timor still made the Indonesian government upset and led to it taking revenge on Australia by undermining the Australian interest in the country.

A 2006 public opinion poll conducted by the Lowy Institute, an Australian foreign relations think tank, found that Indonesians rated their views towards Australia at 51 degrees, on a scale between 0 and 100 degrees ranging from "very unfavourable" to "very warm". In 2012 a public opinion poll conducted again by the Lowy Institute using the same metric found that Indonesians rated their views towards Australia as 62 degrees. This polling also found that just under a third of Indonesians saw Australia as a potential threat to their country.

==== Among Indo people ====
Anti-Australian sentiments among Indo-Dutch people grew in Java in late 1945 and early 1946 because of the holdup by Australians of a "mercy ship" with stores and medical supplies for internees in Java following the end of World War II. This sentiment was also worsened by the delay of lorries and agricultural machinery from Australia to help with the distribution of food and re-establishment of cultivation. Another issue that raised anti-Australian sentiments for Indo people was the landing of the steamship HMAS Mancoora from Australia in February 1946, carrying 700 Native Indonesians home to Java instead of carrying medical supplies and food.

==== 2002 Bali bombings ====
The 2002 Bali bombings, which killed 202 people, including 88 Australians and injured at least a further 75 Australians, were in direct retaliation for Australia's role in the liberation of Timor-Leste and United States' support of the war on terror.

==== Australian Embassy bombing in Jakarta ====
On 9 September 2004, the Australian Embassy in Jakarta was bombed, killing 10 people and injuring 200 others. The perpetrators Jemaah Islamiyah, an organisation which has also claimed responsibility for multiple other attacks against Australians including the 2002 Bali bombings, carried out the attack because of their hatred towards Australians living in Indonesia and the Australian government's deployment of troops in the Iraq War. An Islamist web site, www.islamic-minbar.com, posted a statement by Jemaah Islamiyah saying:

We decided to settle accounts with Australia, one of the worst enemies of God and Islam, ... and a Mujahadeen brother succeeded in carrying out a martyr operation with a car bomb against the Australian embassy...

It is the first of a series of attacks. ... We advise Australians in Indonesia to leave this country or else we will transform it into a cemetery for them.

We advise the Australian government to withdraw its troops from Iraq. If our demand is not satisfied, we will deal them many painful blows. The lines of booby-trapped cars will have no end.

Our jihad (holy war) will continue until the liberation of the land of Muslims.

Jemaah Islamiah in eastern Asia – department of information – Indonesia.

— Jemaah Islamiyah, The Sydney Morning Herald

==== Espionage allegations ====
In October 2013, Indonesians protested the Australian Signals Directorate's alleged 2009 attempt to monitor the phone calls of senior Indonesian officials, including President Susilo Bambang Yudhiyono and his wife Ani Yudhoyono, which included burnings of the flag of Australia. Protests intensified as Australian Prime Minister Tony Abbott refused to apologise, leading to further anti-Australia rhetoric. Indonesia froze ties with Australia as a result and recalled the Indonesian ambassador Nadjib Riphat Kesoema to Jakarta between November 2013 and May 2014.

=== Italy ===
In late 1928 and 1929 the Italian Fascist press, such as Il Popolo d'Italia began publishing articles inflaming Italian public opinion against Australians because the Australian government had been recently obliged to limited to the number of Southern European immigrants accepted into the country each year. Other smaller earlier incidents were used by the Italian Fascist press to push such articles, such as the decision that immigrants should not be allowed to work on the wharves, at Port Adelaide unless they had a sufficient working knowledge of English to make such employment safe. Another incident was the removal of the arms of Italy from the Italian Vice-Consulate in the town of Innisfail, Queensland, by a drunk man.

=== Malaya/Malaysia ===
In June 1949, anti-Australian Government feelings had developed in the Colony of Singapore and Malaya over the War-time Refugees Bill that was brought before the Australian Parliament.

Malaysian Prime Minister Dr. Mahathir bin Mohamad during his first term as prime minister (1981–2003) repeatedly stated that Australia and its people would never be accepted in the region unless Australia altered its ethnic makeup to become "70 per cent Asian." The Mahathir government was also publicly critical of Australia's colonial history and close relations with the United States.

=== New Caledonia ===
Anti-Australian sentiment occurred in New Caledonia in 1983 from anti-independence groups due to the Australian governments support for decolonisation and Kanak independence.

=== Papua New Guinea ===
In a 1997 poll of students at the University of Papua New Guinea, just over a quarter of respondents had an unfavourable feeling about Australia.

In 2001, Anti-Australian sentiment occurred due to Prime Minister John Howard introduction of the Pacific Solution, opening an asylum seeker detention centre on Manus Island. The move draw heavy criticism from local Papua New Guinea politicians and civil society, who accuse Australia of dumping its domestic human rights responsibilities onto a poorer neighbour.

=== Singapore ===
In 1948, there were anti-Australian sentiments in then-colonial Singapore by their citizens due to the treatment of one of their countrywomen.

In June 1949, anti-Australian Government feelings had developed in the Colony of Singapore and Malaya over the War-time Refugees Bill that was brought before the Australian Parliament. The Singapore Progressive Party prepared legislation to ban Australians from Malaya to counter the bill.

During the beginnings of the transfer of the Cocos (Keeling) Islands from the Colony of Singapore to Australia in 1951, the Governor of Singapore Sir Franklin Charles Gimson told Australian Minister for Foreign Affairs Richard Casey that unless it was made clear that the Coco islanders would have the same rights as European Australian citizens regardless of the White Australia policy, "the unofficial majority of the Singapore Legislative Council might well place legislative obstacles in the way of the transfer and there would almost certainly be an outburst of anti-Australian publicity."

In 1980, Singapore's Prime Minister Lee Kuan Yew, famously warned that Australia risked becoming the "poor white trash of Asia" if it did not open up its economy and curb high inflation and industrial unrest. While the comment was a macro-economic critique rather than grassroots hostility, the phrase became a long-standing cultural touchstone highlighting the political differences between the two nations.

In 2001, the Australian embassy in Singapore was one of four embassies planned to be bombed by a Jemaah Islamiyah because of there involvement in United States interests and the Invasion of Afghanistan

=== Turkey ===
After the Christchurch mosque shootings in 2019 (which were carried out by an Australian), Turkish President Recep Tayyip Erdoğan warned that if Australians and New Zealanders with anti-Muslim and anti-Turkish views try to enter Turkey, they will be "sent back home in coffins like their grandfathers", referring to the Australian Landings on Gallipoli against Turkish Forces in World War I. Many Australians and New Zealanders were highly offended by these comments and accused Erdoğan of anti-Australianism. Australian Prime Minister Scott Morrison and New Zealand Prime Minister Jacinda Ardern described these comments as "appalling" and "highly insensitive".

=== United States ===
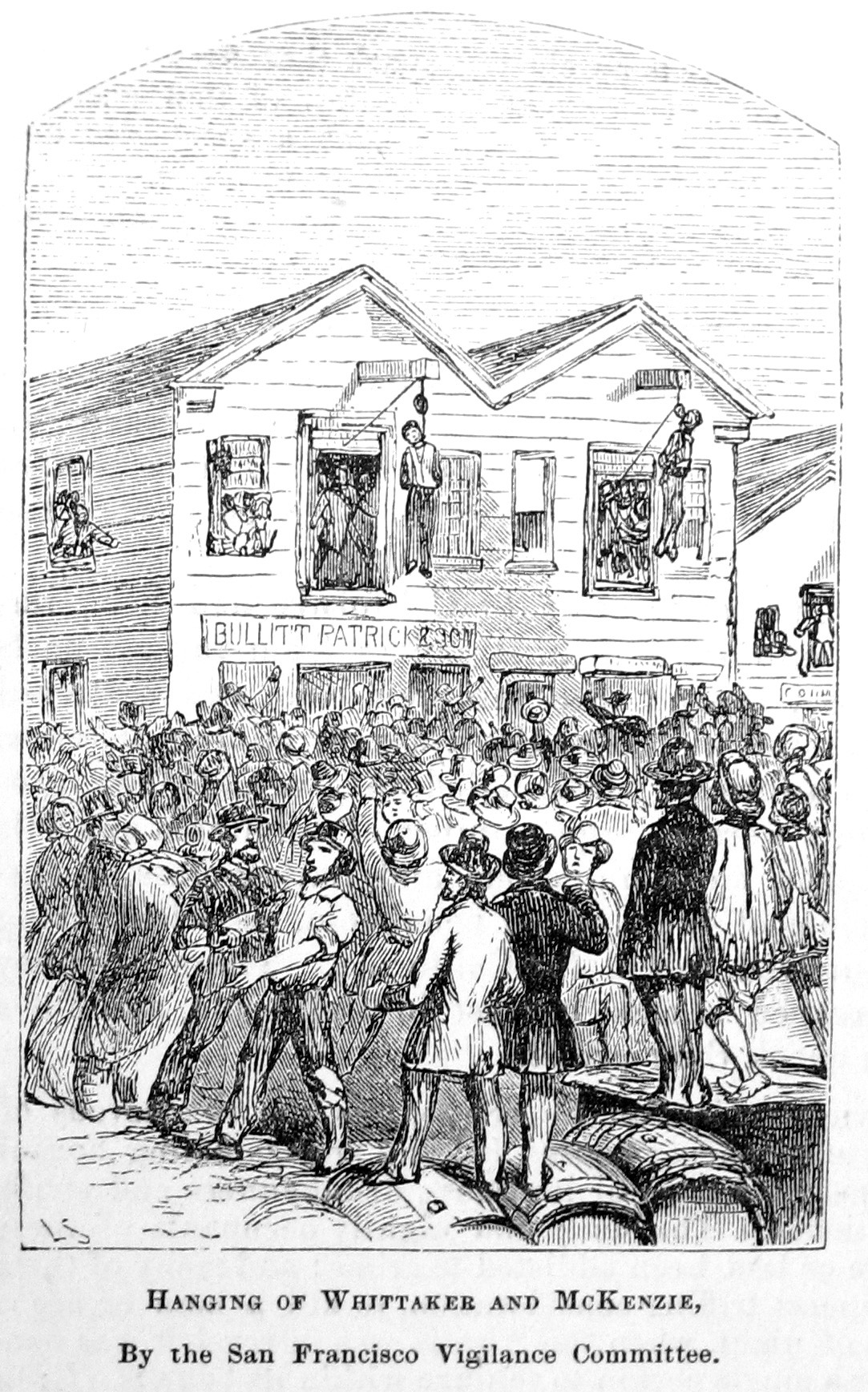
Lynching of Sydney immigrants Samuel Whittaker and Robert McKenzie, 24 August 1851

During the mid-19th century, residents of San Francisco held anti-Australian views towards immigrants from Australia because of the actions of the Sydney Ducks, a gang that started from criminal immigrants from Australia. These criminals were known to commit arson and were blamed for an 1849 fire that devastated the heart of San Francisco, as well as being used as a scapegoat for the rampant crime in the city at the time. Australian immigrants were also blamed the San Francisco Fire of 1851 that destroyed as much as three-quarters of San Francisco, though no proof ever surfaced. The fire and criminality of the Sydney Ducks was the catalyst for the formation of the first Committee of Vigilance of 1851.

The committee lynched four immigrants from Sydney by hanging. John Jenkins, accused of burglary, was hanged on 10 June 1851; James Stuart, accused of murder, who was hanged on 11 July 1851; and Samuel Whittaker and Robert McKenzie, associates of Stuart accused of "various heinous crimes", who were hanged on 24 August 1851. The committee also saw that one immigrant was whipped, fourteen were forcefully deported back to Australia, fourteen were informally ordered to leave California, fifteen were handed over to public authorities and forty-one were discharged. The committee also tried to punish arsonists.

=== Vanuatu ===
Anti-Australian sentiment in Vanuatu is generally a result of Australia's perceived geopolitical presence in the area, historic grievances and government climate policies.

There is prominent political pushback against perceived Australian heavy-handedness by many Ni-Vanuatu. During negotiations for the Nakamal Agreement, several domestic politicians and opposition figures vocally criticised the Australia government for trying to limit Vanuatu's sovereign right to build infrastructure or secure trade partnerships with other nations, specifically China.

Vanuatu's leadership has frequently call out Australia and pushed anti-Australian rhetoric for what they view as hypocrisy on environmental issues. Vanuatu's Climate Change Minister, Ralph Regenvanu, has directly condemned Australia for failing to curb fossil fuel expansions, stating that Australia is "not doing enough" while Pacific nations bear the brunt of rising sea levels and extreme weather.

=== Zimbabwe ===
Anti-Australian sentiment began in Zimbabwe in 2002 following the souring of relations after Zimbabwe began its controversial land reform programme, occupying farms owned by members of Zimbabwe's white minority, sometimes by force. Following evidence of violence and intimidation in the 2002 Presidential election, Australian Prime Minister John Howard, alongside South African president, Thabo Mbeki, and the Nigerian president, Olusegun Obasanjo, led efforts which resulted in Zimbabwe's suspension (and eventual voluntary departure) from the Commonwealth of Nations in 2002–2003. The state-controlled newspaper The Herald, routinely ran opinion pieces and editorials framing Australian as "butchers" and "racists" throughout the 2000s on behalf of the Ministry of Information. In December 2003, Zimbabwean Foreign Minister Stan Mudenge publicly lashed out at Australian Prime Minister John Howard labelling him "the butcher of Baghdad" in reference to Australia's military involvement in the Iraq War, stating that Zimbabwe would never bow to Howard's demands for democratic regime change.

==== Cricket ====
Sporting links between the two countries were disrupted, with the Howard government banning the Australian cricket team from taking part in a scheduled tour of the country in 2007, citing the propaganda boost that it would provide for the Mugabe régime. In response the state-controlled newspaper The Herald, routinely ran opinion pieces and editorials framing Australians as "racists" and the Australian government as trying to demonise and isolate their state. Zimbabwe's Ambassador to Australia, Stephen Chiketa, directly accused the Australian government of racism in May 2007. He publicly asserted that “the issue of racism cannot be separated from the decision to ban the tour,” highlighting that Australia never threatened boycotts when Zimbabwe's squad was historically comprised primarily of white players. Robert Mugabe personally dismissed Australia during a public address, stating that when Western nations complain about his government maintaining law and order, "we take the position that they can go hang."

In 2008, Zimbabwe Cricket President Peter Chingoka and CEO Ozias Bvute were slapped with strict visa bans and asset freezes by the Australian government. State media and cricket officials fiercely condemned this, framing it as an aggressive Western strategy to systematically dismantle Zimbabwe's sports infrastructure and international voting rights on the International Cricket Council (ICC) executive board and portrayed it as such inflaming public opinion against Australians.

The political resentment resulted in formal sports sabotage in 2010 when John Howard was nominated by Australia and New Zealand to become the Vice President (and subsequent President) of the ICC. Zimbabwe explicitly voted to reject and blackball Howard's nomination, completely blocking the former Australian Prime Minister from taking the world cricket stage in what was widely seen as direct, long-delayed political payback. While Zimbabwean state media celebrated blocking the man who championed sanctions against them, the Indian media launched its own attacks. Prominent commentators labeled Howard a "closet racist" and a "museum piece" whose past stances on white-minority rule in South Africa and Asian immigration made him unfit to lead a modern, diverse global sport.

In 2022 when Zimbabwe toured Australia for a One Day International series, Zimbabwe Cricket officials described Australia as ‘arrogant’ and “selfish” after a request to play a traditional Test match during the tour to help grow their program was denied. Cricket Australia refused the request and strictly limited the fixture schedule, Zimbabwe Cricket publicly condemned the Australian board claiming Australia treated smaller cricketing nations with open disrespect.

== See also ==
- List of Australians imprisoned or executed abroad
- Foreign relations of Australia
