= Australophile =

Someone with an appreciation or love of Australia

An Australophile (or Ozophile) is someone with an appreciation or love of Australia, which may include its history, geography, language (especially Australian English), culture and popular media. While Australians may be classified as Australophiles because of nationalism or patriotism, non-Australians may also self-identify or be considered as Australophiles. The rise of Australophilia can be linked to the emergence of Australian films and tourism campaigns in the United States throughout the 1980s.

The antonym for an Australophile is an Australophobe.

== Historical overview ==
Australophilia (or Australomania) did not exist in any documented form before 1901, as Australia was colonised in 1788 and became a federation in 1901. Its shorter national history is one reason that Australophilia is newer and less developed when compared to other national philias, such as Anglophilia and Francophilia. Other reasons may include Australia's reliance on the United Kingdom's cultural identity, the Americanisation of Australian popular media before the 1950s, and the pressures of globalisation on Australian media.

The rise of Australophilia in the international community during the 1980s was preceded by Australia's attempts to establish a recognisably Australian national identity, rather than one which relied on the United Kingdom or the United States. Initiatives like the Australian Made campaign and the Fraser government's 1979 Advance Australia campaign allowed Australia to market its assets, like its native fauna and geography, on a global scale. Australia's national identity became recognisably more Australian by the 1980s, but competing mythoi like the natural rural outback and man-made urban beaches caused misconceptions to arise in the Australian national identity. Such misconceptions have remained as a result of popular media and advertisements, including tourism posters, Australian Olympic ceremonies and aircraft cabins.

One early recorded use of the term Australophile is in Germaine Greer's 1982 article on the rise of Australophilia, where she wrote about the difference "between me and the current generation of Australophiles". While Greer was critical of Australophilia, describing Australia as "a land of lotus-eaters" and Australophilia itself as "the flap and twitter of the current craze for things Oz", the 1980s was a decade that saw the rise of Australophilia in the international community. This came from a surge in Americanised tourism campaigns and the success of Australian films in Hollywood (like Crocodile Dundee), both of which specifically contributed to the growth of Australia's tourism industry and global interest in Australian culture.

== Australian stereotyping ==
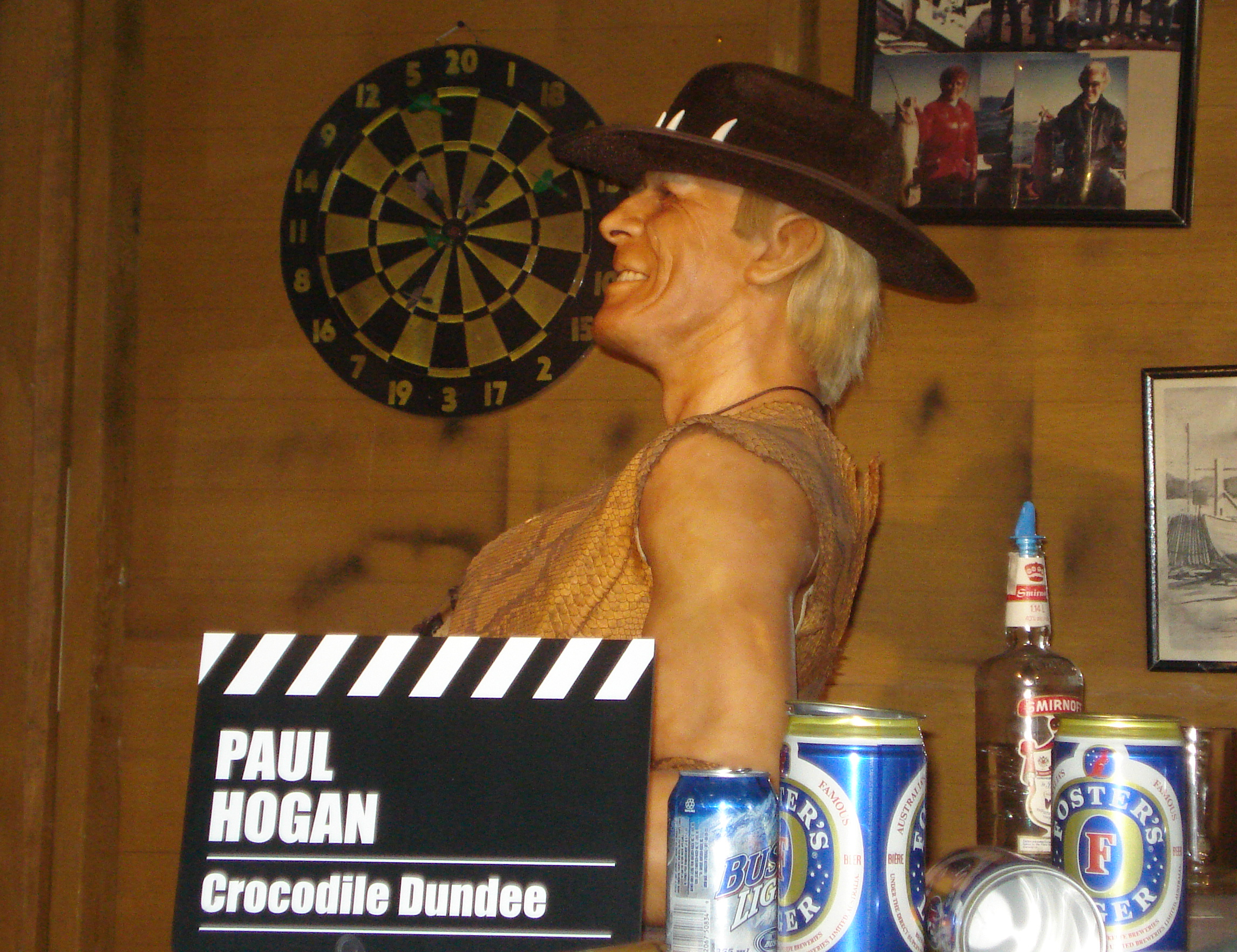
Characters such as Crocodile Dundee stereotyped the Aussie male.

The rise of Australophilia has been fuelled by the spread of Australian stereotypes, especially linguistic and cultural stereotypes. While Australophilia in the early 21st century differs from the late 20th century, stereotypes regarding Australian culture, Australian English and other aspects of Australia have been prevalent since the 1980s. Many of these stereotypes have led to misconceptions of Australia, such as the vulgarity of Australian English and the Australian people (see: larrikin and ocker).

One common linguistic stereotype includes the assumption that most Australians use words like mate and bloody in everyday conversation. Another is the perception of Australian English as a casual and vulgar variant of the English language. These have been reinforced by tourism campaigns and popular media promoting certain modes of Australian English since the 1980s, such as Paul Hogan's popularisation of g'day and Barry Humphries' use of colloquial idioms like "as dry as a kookaburra's khyber".

One common cultural stereotype includes the mythos of a mineral-rich but lazy Australian working class, connected to Donald Horne's 1960s reference of Australia as "the Lucky Country". Another is the misrepresentation of outback Australia and its wildlife for commercialisation, like the crocodile motifs in the Northern Territory. Like linguistic stereotypes, these cultural stereotypes have been reinforced by tourism campaigns and popular media, resulting in the "distinctive way of life" popularising the Australian outback lifestyle in Crocodile Dundee and the contemporary urban lifestyle shown in the Australian soap opera Neighbours.

== Australian English and Australianisms ==
Non-Australian Australophiles show more positive interest in the Australian accent than Australian Australophiles, particularly in regards to the broad Australian variant. One reason is the popularisation of the broad Australian variant and Australian slang by 1980s tourism advertisements and Australian popular media, like Paul Hogan in Crocodile Dundee. Another reason is that the broad Australian variant is only spoken by one-third of Australians as of 1987 and is seen as casual and vulgar to Australians who speak other variants of the Australian accent.

The widespread popularity of Bluey in the 2020s has resulted in a resurgence of interest in Australianisms, with some children in the US reportedly using Australian vocabulary. Aspects of Australian accents have also generated online attention, such as the Australian pronunciation of no being emphasised as "naur".

At least 2000 words, definitions and phrases that originated from or are heavily influenced by Australian English have been included in the Oxford Dictionaries by 2015, including selfie. Some words, like bush and larrikin, exist in broader English use but have a different or greater use in Australian English.

=== Anglo-Celtic influence ===
The Australian accent is derived from the British and Irish accents, as most of its early settlers originated from London and Ireland, and is attributed to working-class urban English dialects that were homogenised between the 1830s and 1880s. This can be seen in the adaptation of Australianisms from pre-existing English words, like bushranger.

=== Aboriginal influence ===
Indigenous Australian languages have contributed to the use of Australianisms, including kangaroo and boomerang. These languages did not have much influence on Australian English before the 1980s, as non-English languages had little impact on the development of Australian English, and Indigenous Australian languages were not taught in schools at the time.

== Australian geography ==
Australia features a diverse range of climates and terrains, but some are especially recognisable to Australophiles. While Australia has World Heritage Sites ranging from the tropics and reefs to rainforests and mountain ranges, many Australophiles are especially interested in Australia's beaches and rural outback. This interest has been fuelled by conservation efforts for some of Australia's natural assets, with more than three million people annually visiting the Greater Blue Mountains Area as of 2007, and representation in popular media, like the Mad Max franchise.

Australia's tourism industry has capitalised on the value of Australia's natural environment, with the Australian Tourist Commission identifying Australia's geographic diversity as one of its most recognisable assets. Tourism Australia has also noted that its focus on the Australian outback in its 2006 "Australian invitation" campaign promotes Australophilia through its "single and compelling brand message". This has created an Australian identity built on its ruralism rather than its urbanism, which exists at odds with Australia's status as one of the most urbanised countries in the world.

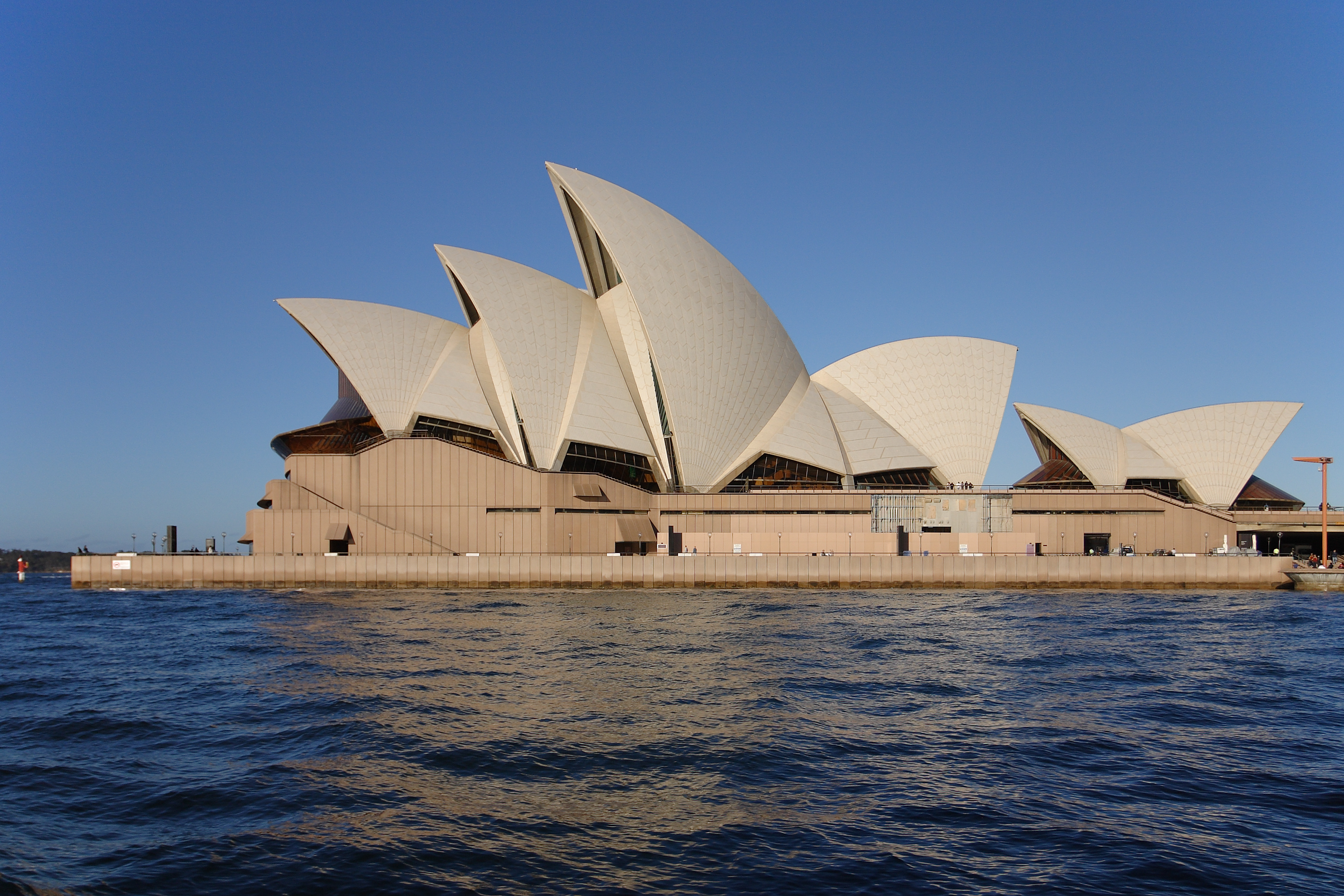
The Sydney Opera House, one of Australia's World Heritage Sites

=== Australian heritage sites ===
Australia's national and World Heritage sites are recognised for their outstanding universal value, with a majority of its World Heritage Sites listed as natural heritage sites as of 2004. Some are national and World Heritage sites, like the Sydney Opera House, while others are national heritage sites that are internationally renowned, like Bondi Beach. Some national heritage sites include internationally renowned landmarks such as Uluru in the Uluru-Kata Tjuta National Park, The Twelve Apostles and the Great Barrier Reef.

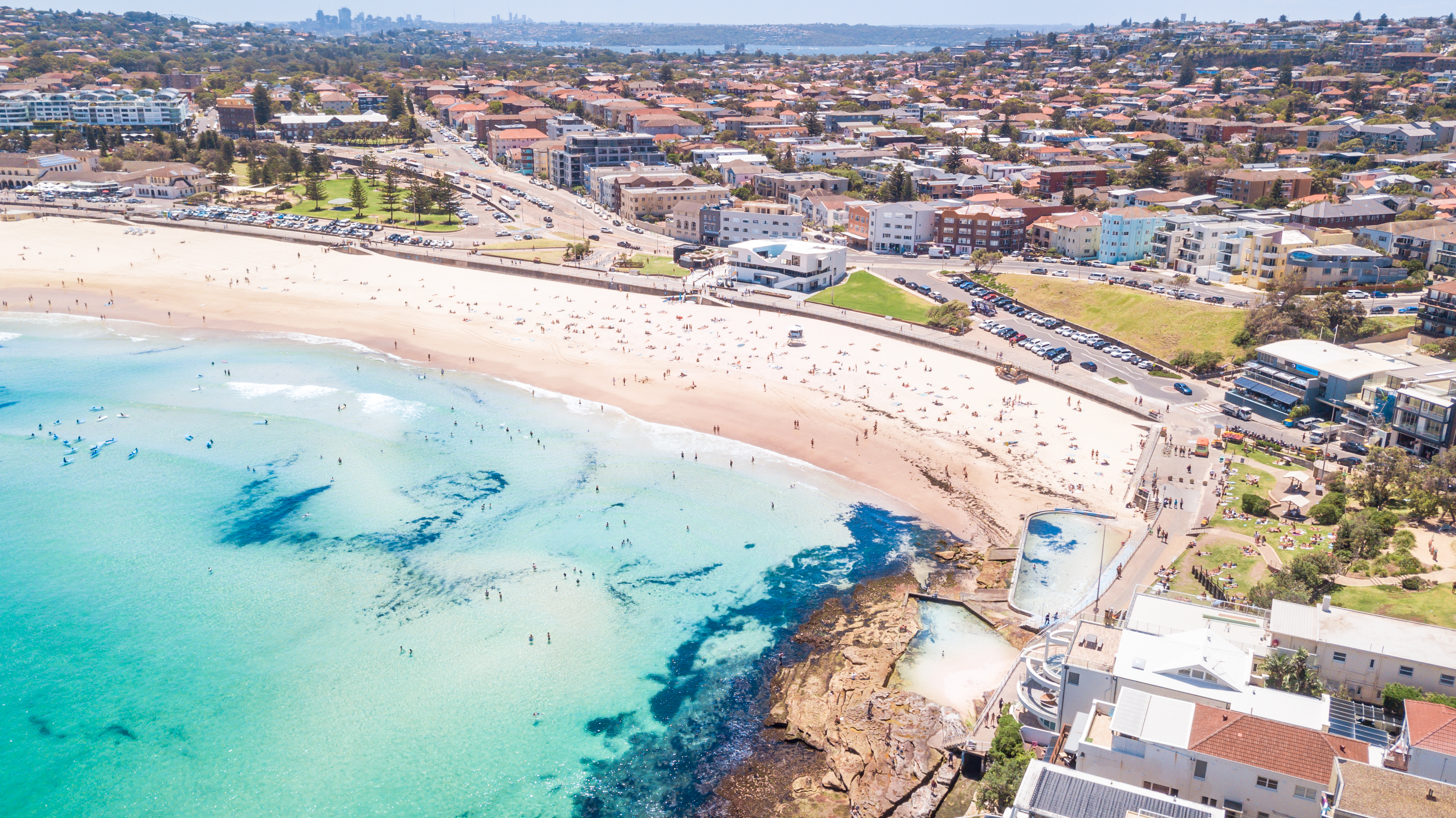
An aerial view of Bondi Beach

=== Australian beaches ===
Both Australian and non-Australian Australophiles enjoy Australia's beaches and its culture, with popular beaches like Bondi Beach shaping Australia's national identity through their associations with surfing, suntanning, lifesaving and egalitarian living. Many of Australia's famous beaches, like Bondi and Surfers Paradise, are located in or near major cities. Australia's beaches cater to a culturally diverse population, including working-class and middle-class Australians and tourists, and provide beachgoers with a public yet casual experience of Australian society. Though beach culture has changed since its inception in the 19th century, with fewer Australians visiting the beach as compared to the earlier 20th century, commercialisation has ensured that tourists have continued to visit Australia's beaches.

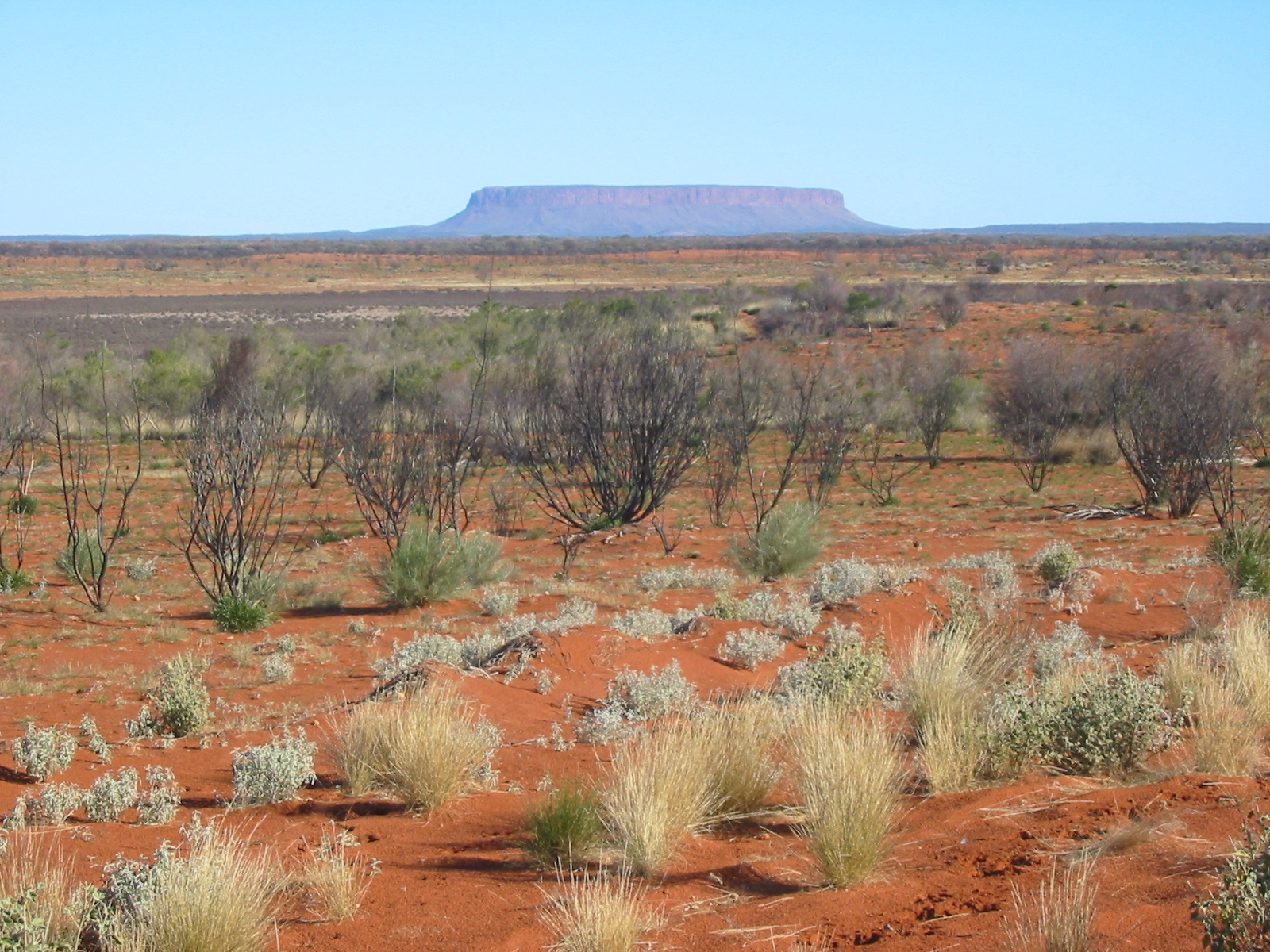
The Northern Territory outback, with Mount Conner in the background

=== Australian Outback ===
The Australian outback (not to be confused with the Australian bush) is an important and highly recognisable part of the Australian cultural identity. While Australians have historically shared exaggerated stories about the supposed horrors of the outback and the outback remains an undefined portion of Australia's territory, it covers the majority of Australia's landmass and has been likened to the American frontier. Iconic symbols like kangaroos and ockers have emerged from the outback, which in turn have been commodified by Australian tourism advertisements. Several Australian films have also used the outback to promote Australia to non-Australians, including The Adventures of Priscilla, Queen of the Desert and Australia.

== Australia in popular media ==
The rise of Australophilia has also been fuelled by Australian celebrities and popular media, which in turn have been credited with the popularisation of Australian slang and culture since the 1980s. This includes films like Crocodile Dundee, TV shows like Neighbours, singers like Shannon Noll, and actors like Hugh Jackman.

=== Australian film ===
Two Australian films credited with the rise of Australophilia throughout and immediately after the 1980s are Crocodile Dundee and Strictly Ballroom. Crocodile Dundee is further credited with packaging the Australian outback and its wildlife as an exotic yet tameable commodity for non-Australian Australophiles to consume. Like many films set in the Australian outback, Crocodile Dundee depicts the outback as an unknown entity that requires an outsider to explore and familiarise its audience with the Australian wilderness. It was also filmed specifically for an American audience, with the eponymous character modelled off Davy Crockett and American concepts of individualism and manhood. Conversely, Strictly Ballroom was set in a more urban locale that was "recognisably Australian, but… conceived by the film-makers as an imaginary location". Rather than appealing to international audiences with shots of the Australian wilderness, Strictly Ballroom drew on Australian comedy and burlesque to showcase Australian culture.

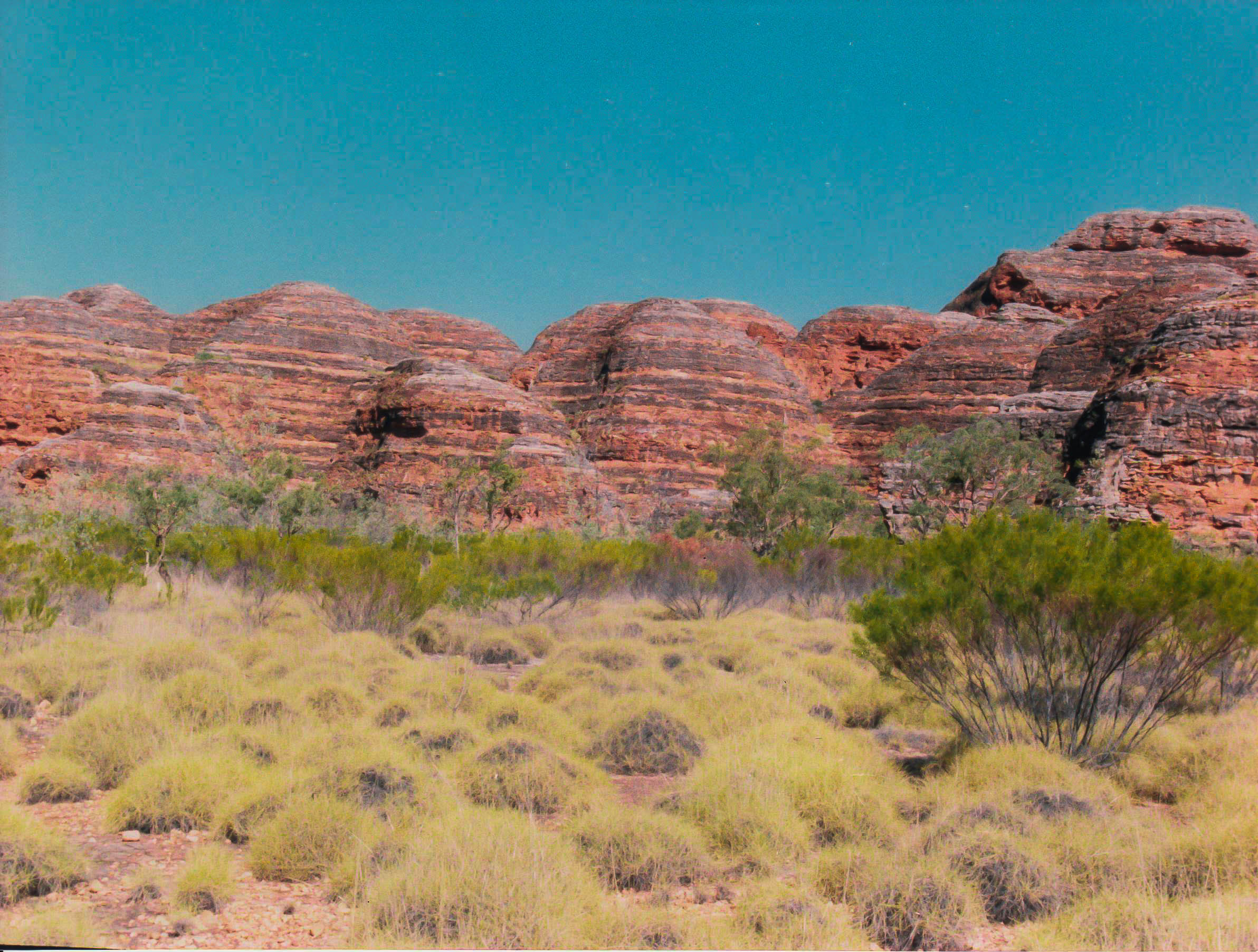
The Bungle Bungle Range, featured in Baz Luhrmann's Australia

Several Australian films continued to promote the Australian wilderness and aspects of its culture to non-Australian audiences beyond the 1980s, including Australia and the Mad Max franchise. Like many Australian films set in the outback, Australia featured scenery from lesser-known localities to showcase the vastness of the Australian outback. Unlike many Australian films, Australia featured in a multimillion-dollar tourism campaign run by Tourism Australia in 2008, but its focus remained on depicting Australia's post-colonial history and the relationship between Anglo-Celtic settlers and Indigenous Australians. While the Mad Max franchise engages with Indigenous Australian culture through its inclusion of the boomerang and the didgeridoo, this culture was evoked by non-Indigenous Australians and showcased a bleaker take on the relationship between Anglo-Celtic settlers and Indigenous Australians. Rather than depicting Australia as a land of potential, like in Australia, the Mad Max franchise depicts the Australian wilderness as dangerous and untameable.

=== Australian television ===
Neighbours began airing in Australia from 1985 and in the United Kingdom from 1986, but it achieved greater success overseas than it did in Australia. This is due to the fantasised Australian lifestyle Neighbours offered to international viewers that sold an idealised yet relatable and partially obtainable Australian way of life.

While Baywatch was primarily filmed in California and Hawaii, two special episodes were filmed at Avalon Beach in November 1998. Controversy arose as the Baywatch filming crew appropriated portions of Avalon Beach, which threatened its publicly accessible nature, and a series of community lobbying efforts resulted in the relocation of Baywatch to Hawaii. Despite the Avalon community's opposition to the filming, the Australian film industry and Tourism New South Wales were two of several stakeholders who had anticipated the economic benefits of a potential filming deal with Baywatch. The special episodes, titled Baywatch Down Under, were eventually aired in February 1999.

== See also ==
- Europhile

== Sources ==
- Aplin, Graeme (2007). "Chapter 3: Australia and World Heritage". In Jones, Roy; Shaw, Brian J. (eds.). Geographies of Australian Heritage: Loving a Sunburnt Country?. Ashgate Publishing. ISBN 9780815389200.
- Arrow, Michelle (2009). Friday on Our Minds: Popular Culture in Australia Since 1945. Sydney: University of NSW Press. pp. 4–5. ISBN 9780868406626.
- Booth, Douglas (2001). Australian Beach Cultures: The History of Sun, Sand and Surf. Abingdon: Routledge. ISBN 0714681784.
- Corbett, Claire (Autumn 2017). "Nowhere to run: Repetition compulsion and heterotopia in the Australian post-apocalypse – from 'Crabs' to Mad Max Beyond Thunderdome". Science Fiction Film and Television. 10 (3): 329–351. doi:10.3828/sfftv.2017.23. S2CID 191659473.
- Cook, Pam (2010). Baz Luhrmann. London: Palgrave Macmillan. ISBN 9781844571581.
- "National Heritage Places – Sydney Opera House". Department of Agriculture, Water and Environment, Australian Government. 3 October 2021. Archived from the original on 11 January 2022.
- "National Heritage Places – Bondi Beach". Department of Agriculture, Water and Environment, Australian Government. 10 October 2021. Archived from the original on 24 May 2022.
- "National Heritage Places – Uluru-Kata Tjuta National Park". Department of Agriculture, Water and Environment, Australian Government. 29 October 2021. Archived from the original on 11 January 2022.
- "Why the Conservative Party Adores Australia". The Economist. 11 June 2020. ISSN 0013-0613.
- Fiske, John; Hodge, Bob; Turner, Graeme (1987). Myths of Oz: Reading Australian Popular Culture. Boston: Allen & Unwin. ISBN 9781138691452.
- Frost, Warwick (2010). "Life changing experiences: Films and tourists in the Australian Outback". Annals of Tourism Research. 37 (3). doi:10.1016/j.annals.2010.01.001.
- Greer, Germaine (1 August 1982). "Germaine Greer in the Land of Oz". The Observer. London.
- Gwynn, Mark (2015). "What Australian slang has given the world". BBC. Archived from the original on 4 January 2022.
- Hall, Colin Michael (2007). "Chapter 4: The Changing Geographies of Australia's Wilderness Heritage". In Jones, Roy; Shaw, Brian J. (eds.). Geographies of Australian Heritage: Loving a Sunburnt Country?. Ashgate Publishing. ISBN 9780815389200.
- Lam, Celia; Raphael, Jackie, eds. (2019). Aussie Fans: Uniquely Placed in Global Popular Culture. Iowa: University of Iowa Press. ISBN 9781609386573.
- McArthur, Tom; Lam-McArthur, Jacqueline; Fontaine, Lise, eds. (2018). The Oxford Companion to the English Language (2nd ed.). Oxford: Oxford University Press. doi:10.1093/acref/9780199661282.001.0001. ISBN 978-0-19-966128-2. OCLC 1040511034. OL 30592905M. Wikidata Q135987047.
- McGregor, Russell (19 June 2006). "The necessity of Britishness: Ethno-cultural roots of Australian nationalism". Nations and Nationalism. 12 (3): 493–511. doi:10.1111/j.1469-8129.2006.00250.x.
- O'Regan, Tom; Potter, Anna (1 November 2013). "Globalisation from within? The de-nationalising of Australian film and television production". Media International Australia. 149 (1): 5–14. doi:10.1177/1329878X1314900103. S2CID 141097173.
- Reuter, Thomas (18 June 2004). Inequality, Crisis and Social Change in Indonesia. Taylor & Francis. ISBN 9780203401910.
- Turner, Graeme (1994). Making it National: Nationalism and Australian Popular Culture. New York: Allen & Unwin. ISBN 9781003116363.
