= Carita Paradis =

Swedish linguist

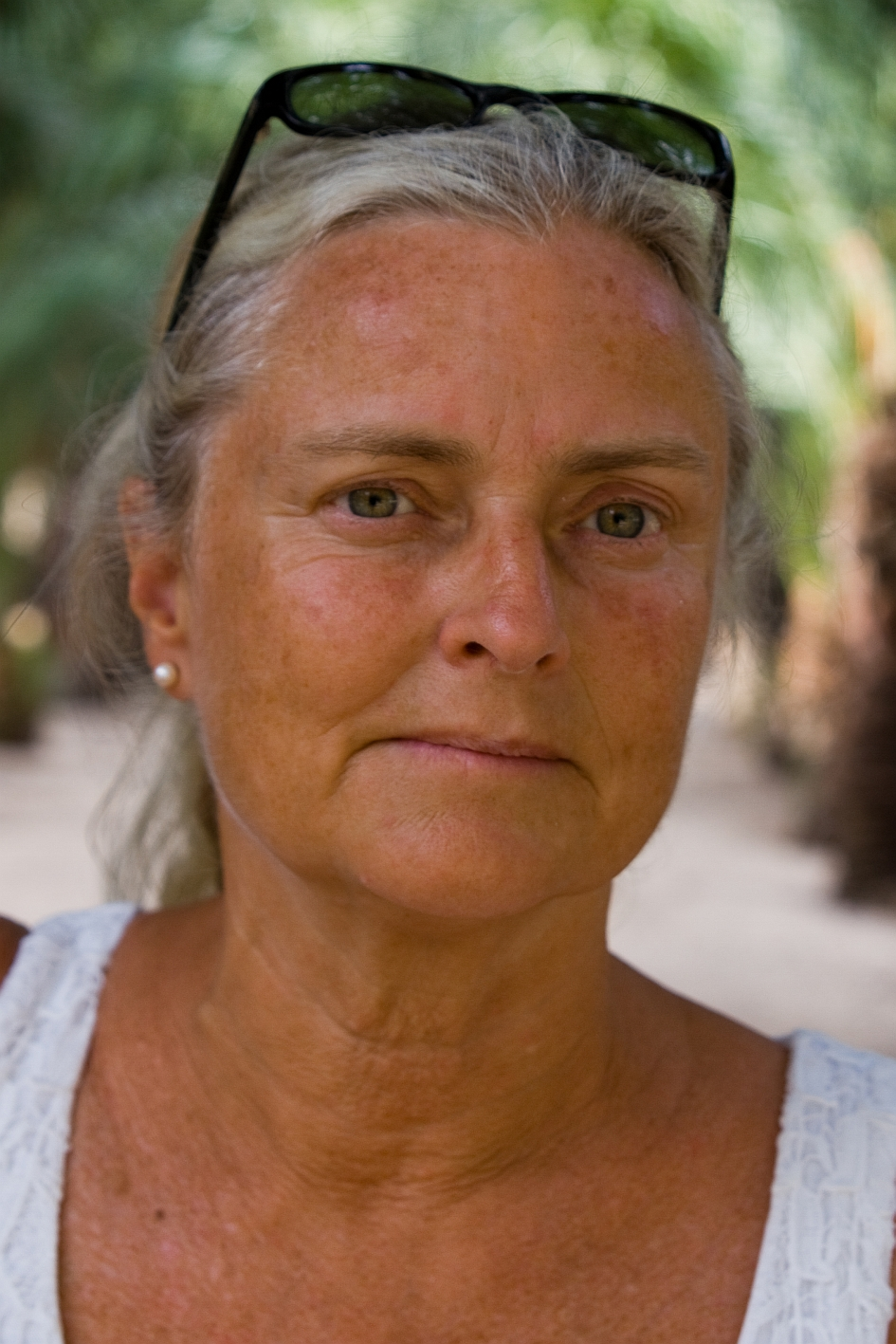
- Occupation: Linguist

Academic background
- Education: Lund University (BA); University of Gothenburg (MA); Lund University (PhD); University of Manchester (visiting PhD)

Carita Paradis (born 1953) is a Swedish linguist, and Professor of English Language and Linguistics at Lund University.

Her research is focused on the dynamics of meaning-making in human communication. Within the framework of Cognitive Semantics, her works highlight the meaningful functioning of language in all its guises and all its uses when people communicate with one another. She is best known for her work on meanings related to degree, opposition and stance-taking in human communication. She has authored/co-authored and edited several books, including Degree Modifiers of Adjectives in Spoken British English, Antonyms in English: Construals, Constructions and Canonicity, The Construal of Spatial Meaning: Windows into Conceptual Space, Representing Wine – Sensory Perceptions, Communication and Cultures, and Advice in Conversation: A Mixed-Methods Approach to Corpus Pragmatics.

Paradis is a Member and former President of the Royal Society of Letters at Lund, and a Member of Academia Europaea. She has served as the Chair of the Scientific Council for the Humanities and Social Sciences, and of Linguistics at The Swedish Research Council and an expert at the European Research Council. She is Editor of Cognitive Linguistics in Practice book series.

== Career ==
Upon receiving her Doctoral degree from Lund University, Paradis started her academic career as a Research fellow at Lund University in 1997. In the following year, she also held an appointment as a Senior lecturer, and served on this position until 2005. She was then appointed Full Professor of English Linguistics at Linnaeus University, before rejoining Lund University in 2010 as Full Professor of English Language and Linguistics, and Manager of Research and Research Education.

Paradis was Chair of Linguistics at the Swedish Research Council from 2010 to 2015, and Chair of the Scientific Council for the Humanities and Social Sciences from 2013 to 2015. She is a Member of the board of the Scandinavian Association of Language and Cognition (SALC) and was appointed as its vice-president from 2006 until 2009, and President from 2011 until 2013.

Paradis has been a visiting professor at various universities including the University of Verona, Shanghai International Studies University, Charles University, University of Castilla–La Mancha, University of Zagreb, University of Málaga and a visiting PhD student University of Manchester.

== Research ==
Paradis’ research focuses on semantics and pragmatics with particular attention to meaning-making in human communication. Her early work explored issues related to expressions of degree and their configuration in different contexts. She explored and explained why speakers feel that it is natural to say "absolutely fantastic" and "very nice", but not "very fantastic" and "absolutely nice". Building on the insights from configurational constraints related to gradability, she then extended her research agenda extensively to define the role of construals of conceptual structure into areas such as opposition, categorization, metonymization and metaphorization. She developed an analytical framework for the analysis of authentic language, Lexical meanings as ontologies and construals. While employing different empirical methods – corpus and computational techniques as well as experimental techniques, she explores what linguistic expressions reveal about human interactive behaviour, perception and cognition, and inversely how they influence and give rise to patterns and structures in natural language use.

Paradis has been engaged in several collaborative projects both within the language sciences and other academic disciplines such as cognitive psychology, cognitive science and computer science. Interdisciplinary projects that she has participated in over the past decades include Antonomy in language, thought and memory, How the human mind makes sense of contraries in everyday life, MoveEinG, Language for sensory perceptions. Between 2013 and 2017, she was one of three research leaders of the StaViCTA framework project, analyzing and visualizing stance in large data sets. She has also served as a member of the steering committee of NetWordS from 2011 to 2015, funded by European Science Foundation, and the Linnaeus Centre Thinking in time: Cognition, Cognition and Learning (CCL) funded by the Swedish Research Council (2008–2018).

By way of creating data sets for open access to the academic community, Paradis has been involved in the compilation of a new corpus of spoken language, namely the London–Lund Corpus 2 (LLC-2), which is a half-a-million-word corpus with accompanying sound files of speech by adult speakers of British English from 2014 to 2019. The corpus is a follow-up on the worlds’ first machine-readable corpus of spoken language, namely the London–Lund Corpus (LLC-1), which was compiled approximately half a century earlier.

== Awards and honors ==
- 1999 – President's Prize for the best post-doc paper, the Linguistic Association of Canada and the United States (LACUS)
- 2003 – Member, The New Society of Letters, Lund (Vetenskapssocieteten)
- 2014 – Member, The Royal Society of Letters, Lund
- 2014 – Member, AcademiaNet - Database of Outstanding Women Scientists in Europe
- 2016 – Member, Academia Europaea
- 2019–2021 – President, The Royal Society of Letters, Lund
- 2021 – Special Prize for prominent research achievements from Einar Hansen's Research Foundation

== Bibliography ==
=== Selected books ===
- Degree Modifiers of Adjectives in Spoken British English (1997) ISBN 9780862384852
- Antonyms in English: Construals, Constructions and Canonicity (2012) ISBN 9780521761796
- The Construal of Spatial Meaning: Windows into Conceptual Space (2013) ISBN 9780191613142
- Representing Wine – Sensory Perceptions, Communication and Cultures (2019) ISBN 9789027261915
- Advice in conversation: Corpus pragmatics meets mixed methods (2022) ISBN 9781009053617

=== Selected articles ===
- Paradis, C. (2001). Adjectives and boundedness. Cognitive Linguistics 12(1), 47-66 doi.org/10.1515/cogl.12.1.47
- Paradis, C. (2004). Where does metonymy stop? Senses, facets and active zones. Metaphor and symbol, 19(4), 245–264. doi.org/10.1207/s15327868ms1904_1
- Paradis, C. (2005). Ontologies and construals in lexical semantics. Axiomathes, 15, 541–573. doi.org/10.1007/s10516-004-7680-7
- Paradis, C. (2008). Configurations, construals and change: expressions of DEGREE . English Language & Linguistics, 12(2), 317–343. doi.org/10.1017/S1360674308002645
- Paradis, C., & Willners, C. (2011). Antonymy: from conventionalization to meaning-making. Review of Cognitive Linguistics, 9(2.), 367–391. doi.org/10.1075/rcl.9.2.02par
- Paradis, C. (2015). Conceptual spaces at work in sensuous cognition: Domains, dimensions and distances In F. Zenker & P. Gärdenfors (Eds.), Applications of conceptual spaces: The case of geometric knowledge representation (pp. 33–55). Dordrecht: Springer Verlag. doi: 10.1007/978-3-319-15021-5_3
- Hartman, J., & Paradis, C. (2023). The language of sound: events and meaning multitasking of words. Cognitive Linguistics, 34(3-4), 445-477. https://doi.org/10.1515/cog-2022-0006
- Caballero, R., & Paradis, C. (2020). Soundscapes in English and Spanish: a corpus investigation of verb constructions. Language and Cognition, 12(4), 705–728. doi:10.1017/langcog.2020.19
- Paradis, C., Johansson, V., Põldvere, N. (2021). Spoken language in time and across time. English Language and Linguistics, 25(3), 449–57. doi:10.1017/S1360674321000174
