= Rasht =

City in Gilan province, Iran

- City

Persian transcription(s)
  - Persian: رشت
  - romanized: Rašt

Gilaki transcription(s)
  - Persian: رٚشت
  - romanized: Rəšt
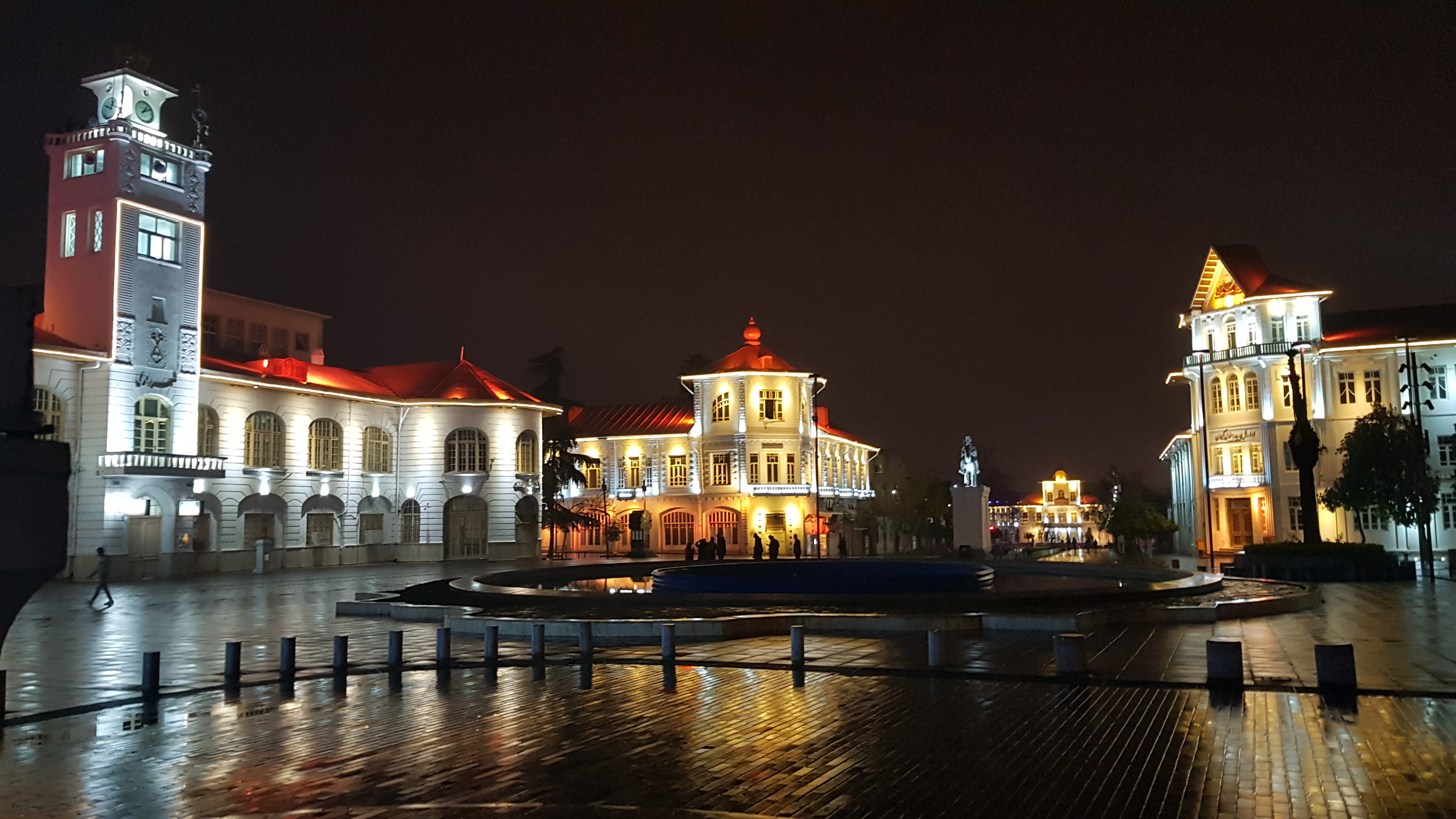
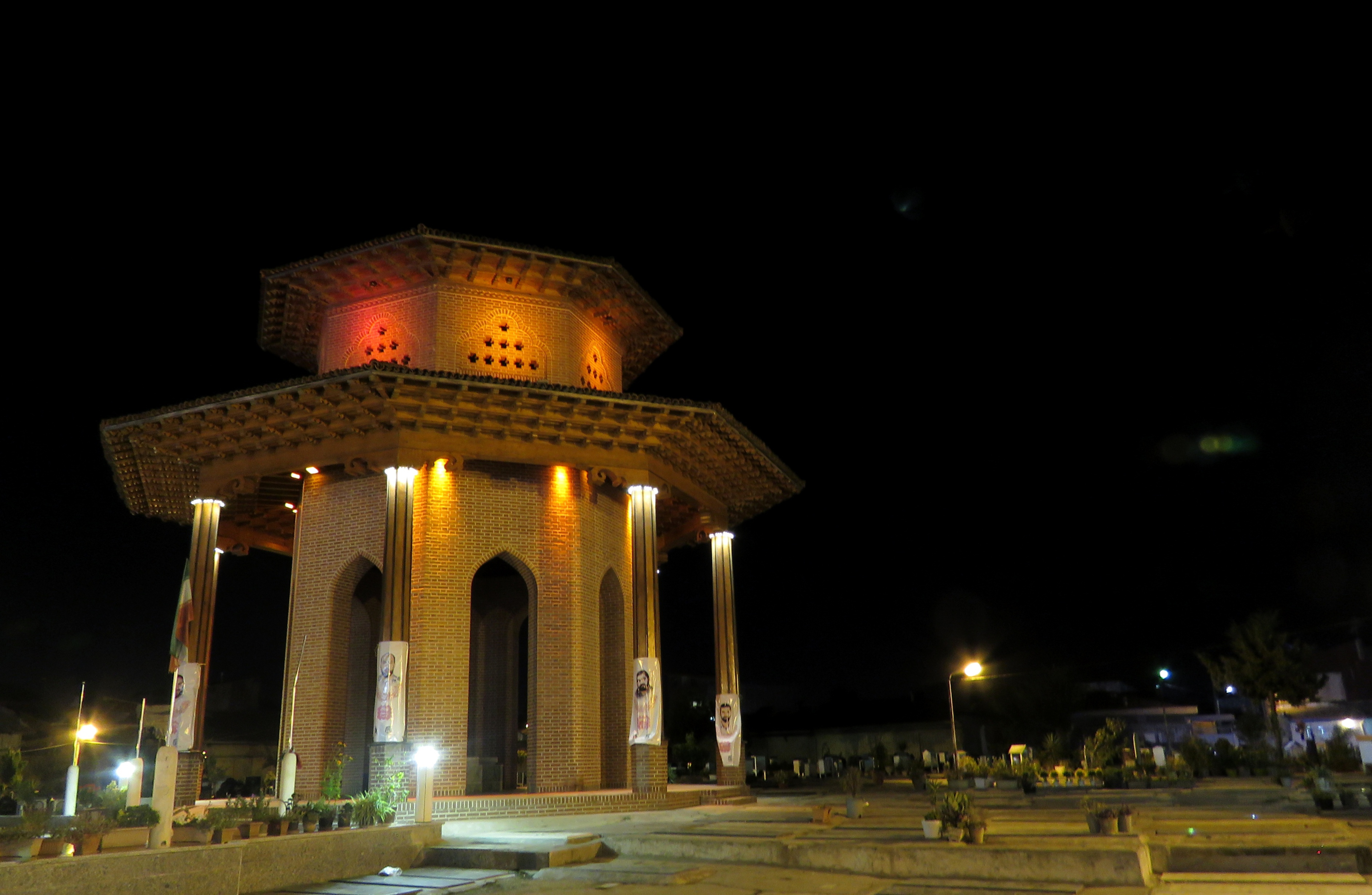
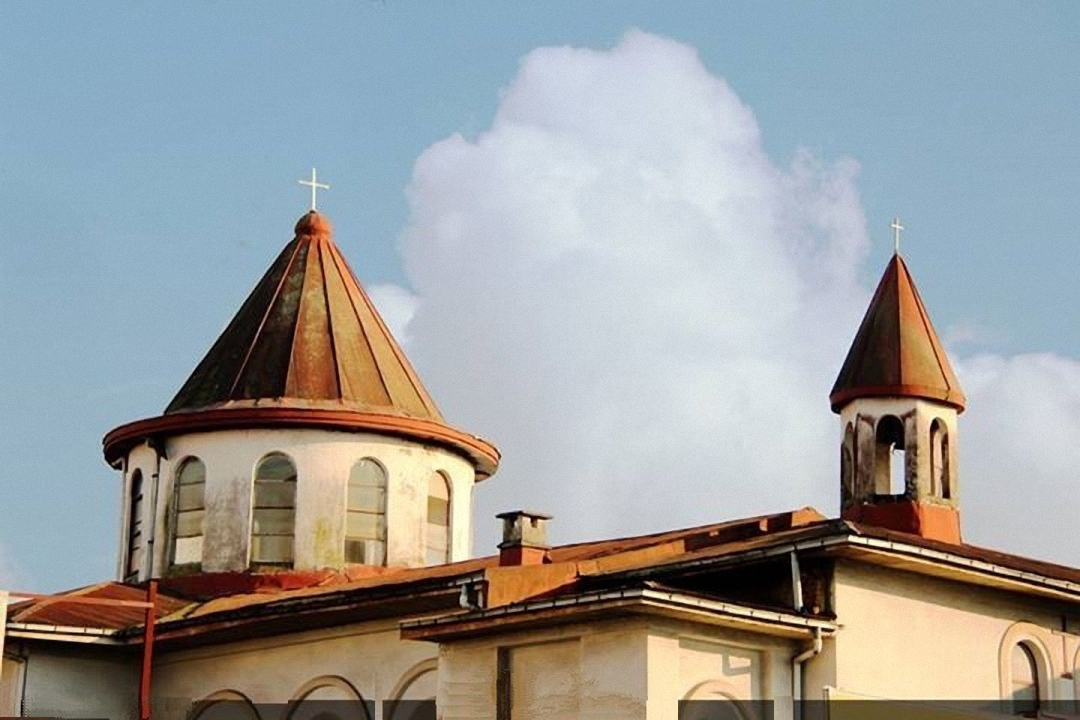
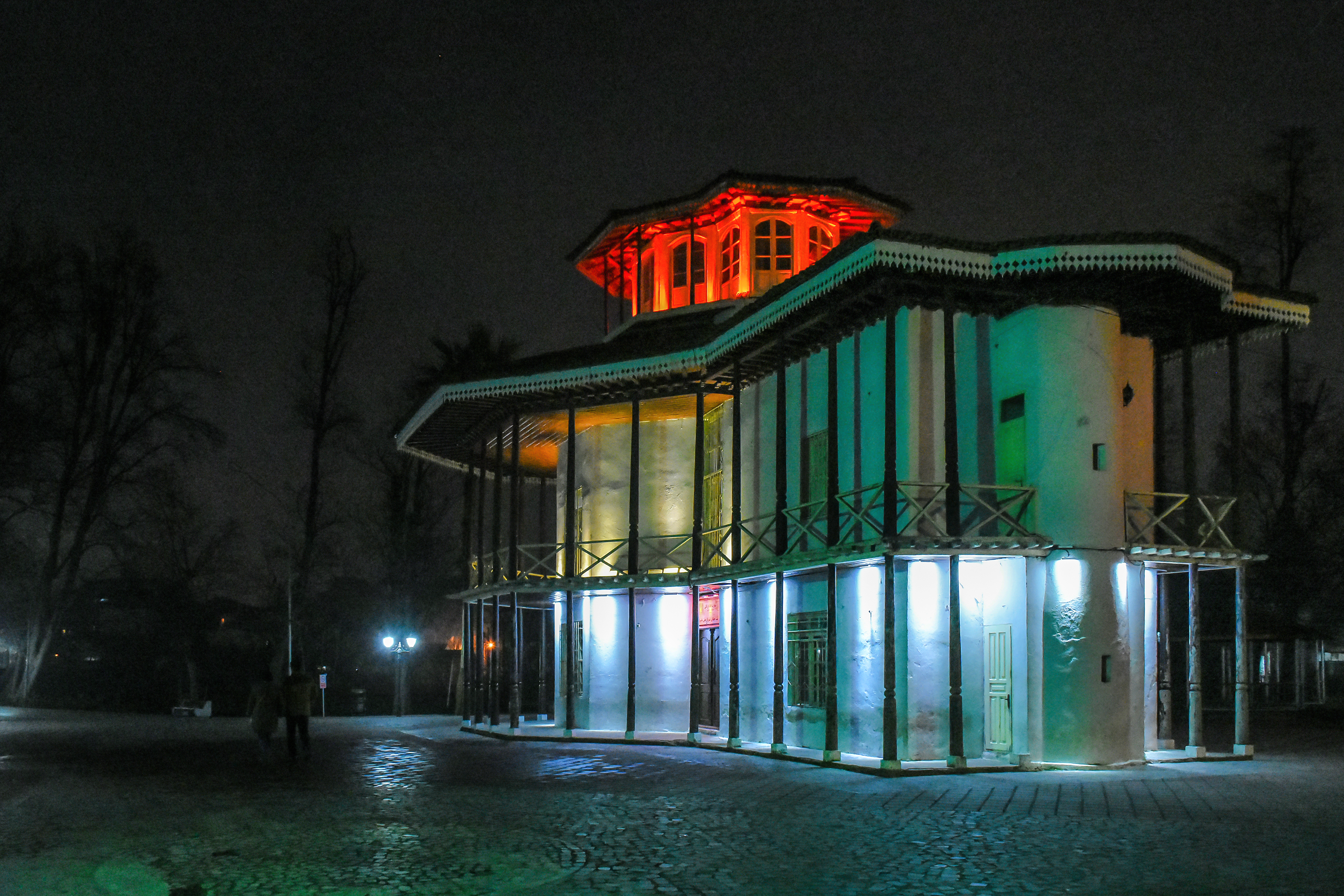
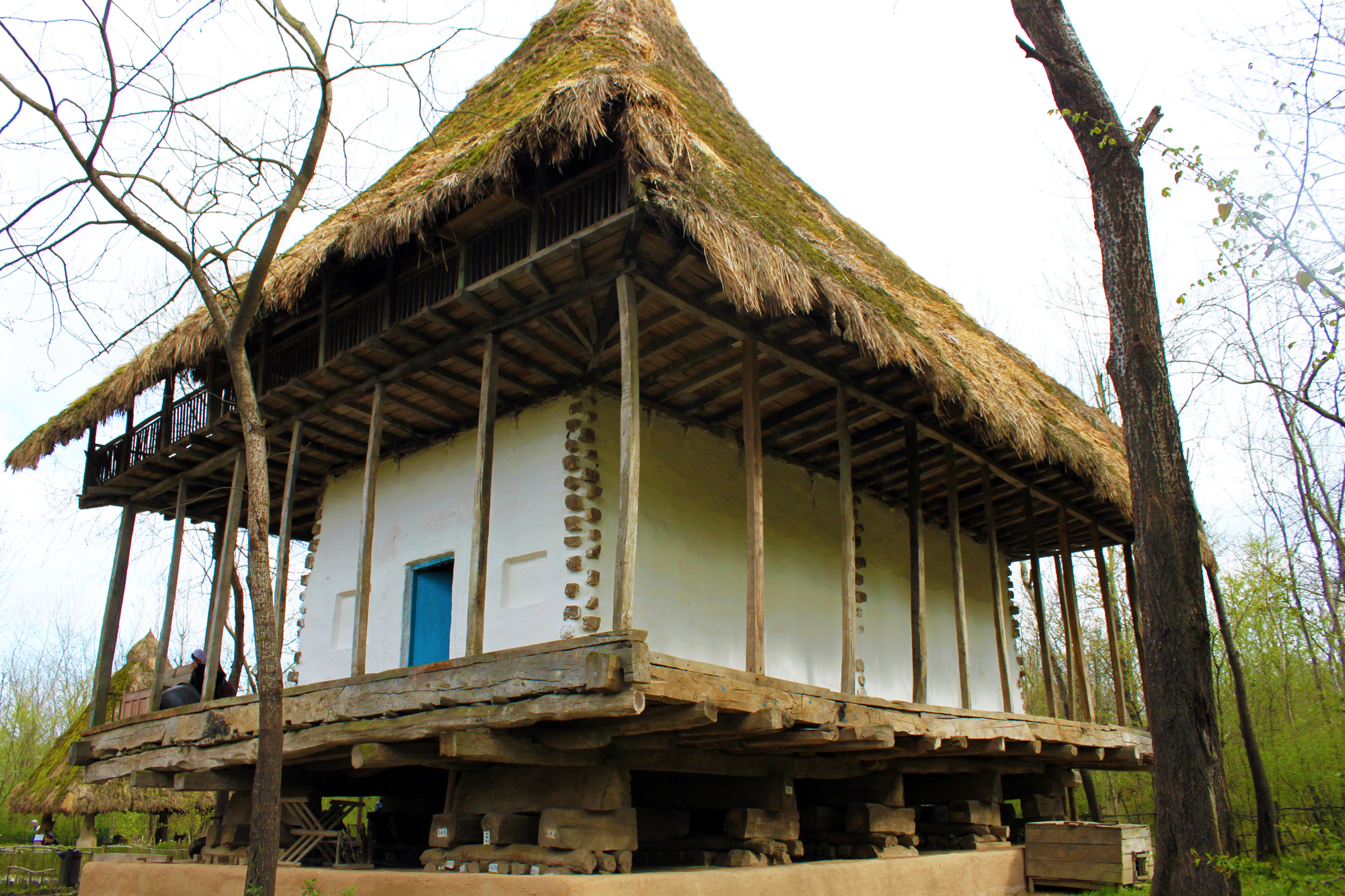
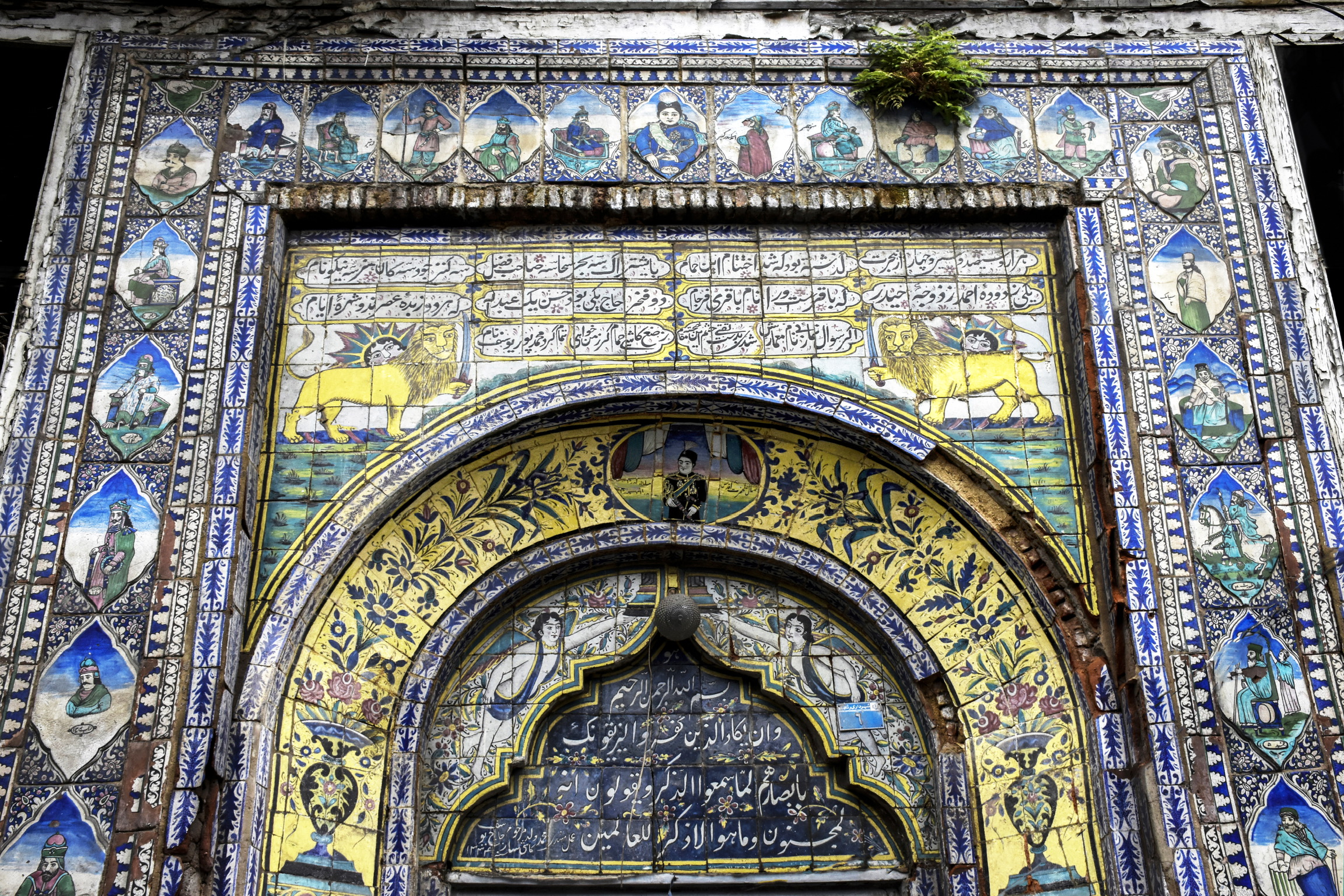
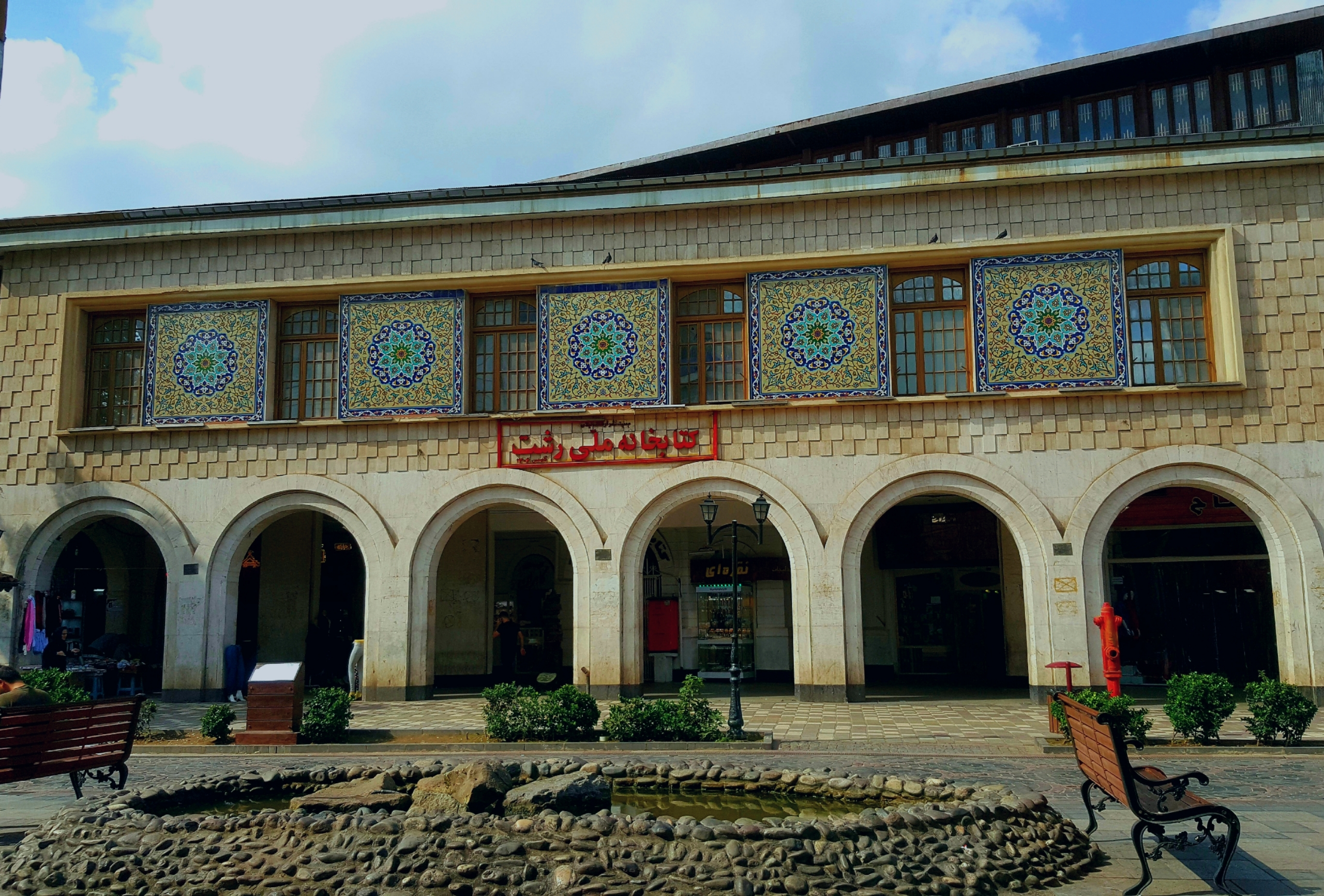
- Municipal hall at night, Mirza Koch tomb, Saint Mesrop Church, Kolah Farangi mansion, Gilan Rural Heritage Museum, Gulzar bath, National library.
- Nicknames: Rain City, Rasht-Heaven, Dar-al-Marz (Borderland)
- Location within Iran
- Coordinates: 37°16′28″N 49°35′20″E
- Country: Iran
- Province: Gilan
- County: Rasht
- District: Central

Government
  - Mayor: Rahim Shoghi
  - City Council Chairman: Mohammad Hossein Vasegh Kargarnia
  - Governor: Hadi Haghshenas

Area
  - Total: 95 km^{2} (37 sq mi)
- Elevation: 0 m (0 ft)

Population (2016)
  - Total: 679,995
  - Density: 7,200/km^{2} (19,000/sq mi)
  - Population Rank in Iran: 11th
- Time zone: UTC+3:30 (IRST)
- Area code: 013
- Climate: Cfa
- Website: rasht.ir

Rasht (Persian: رشت; [ɾæʃt]) (Note: Also romanized as Rast, Rašt, and Resht; also known as Rəšt (Gilaki: رٚشت); and often spelt Recht in French and older German manuscripts) is a city in the Central District of Rasht County, Gilan province, Iran, serving as the capital of the province, the county, and the district. Known as the "City of Silver Rain" (Shahr-e Bārān Ha-ye Noghre i), Rasht has, throughout Iran’s history, served as a border city, earning the historical nickname "Dār al-Marz Rasht" or "Rasht on the Border". With a population of 679,995 in 2016, it is the most populous city in northern Iran.

Rasht is the largest city on Iran's Caspian Sea coast. Due to being between the coast and the mountains, the local environment is rainy with a humid subtropical climate. It also has a temperate rainforest to its south, in contrast to the rest of Iran, which is mostly arid.

It is a major trade center between Caucasia, Russia, and Iran, using the port of Bandar-e Anzali. Rasht is also a major tourist center with the resort of Masouleh in the adjacent mountains and the beaches of Caspian as some of the major attractions.

Historically, Rasht was a major transport and business center which connected Iran to Russia and the rest of Europe, and because of this it was known as the "Gate of Europe". The city has a history that goes back to the 13th century, but its modern history dates back to the Safavid era during which Rasht was a major center of the silk trade with numerous textile workshops. In 2015, this city joined the network of creative cities of the world as a creative gastronomy city under the supervision of UNESCO.

Some of the famous neighbourhoods of Rasht include Golsar, Safsar, Kordmahaleh and Khamiran.

== Etymology ==
There are multiple theories about the origin of the city's name. According to one view, the root of the city's name is the word resh (رش), meaning "very light rain". This is connected with the rainy weather of the area. According to another view, the correct pronunciation of the city's name is Resht, deriving from the root of the verb risidan (ریسیدن) or reshtan (رشتن), both meaning "to spin". This is connected with the importance of silk thread production in the city. The name has also been interpreted as meaning "low, sunken place"; apparently the word originally described a market in the area (rasht bazar) and was later applied to the settlement.

Ali-Akbar Dehkhoda cites a tradition according to which the sum of the numerical values of the letters (per Abjad numerals) corresponds to the date of the founding of the city (900 AH, or 1494/95 AD), although the name is mentioned in the 10th-century geography Hudud al-'Alam (albeit as the name of a district, not of a city). Zana Salehrad notes that the name Rasht could be traced to the ancient Gilaki or Caspian languages, where it may have originally meant "fertile plain" or "verdant land". Surrounded by rivers, forests, and rice paddies, the city has always been defined by its rich natural environment. Over time, the name endured, coming to symbolize not just the geography, but the prosperity and vitality of the people who lived there.

== History ==
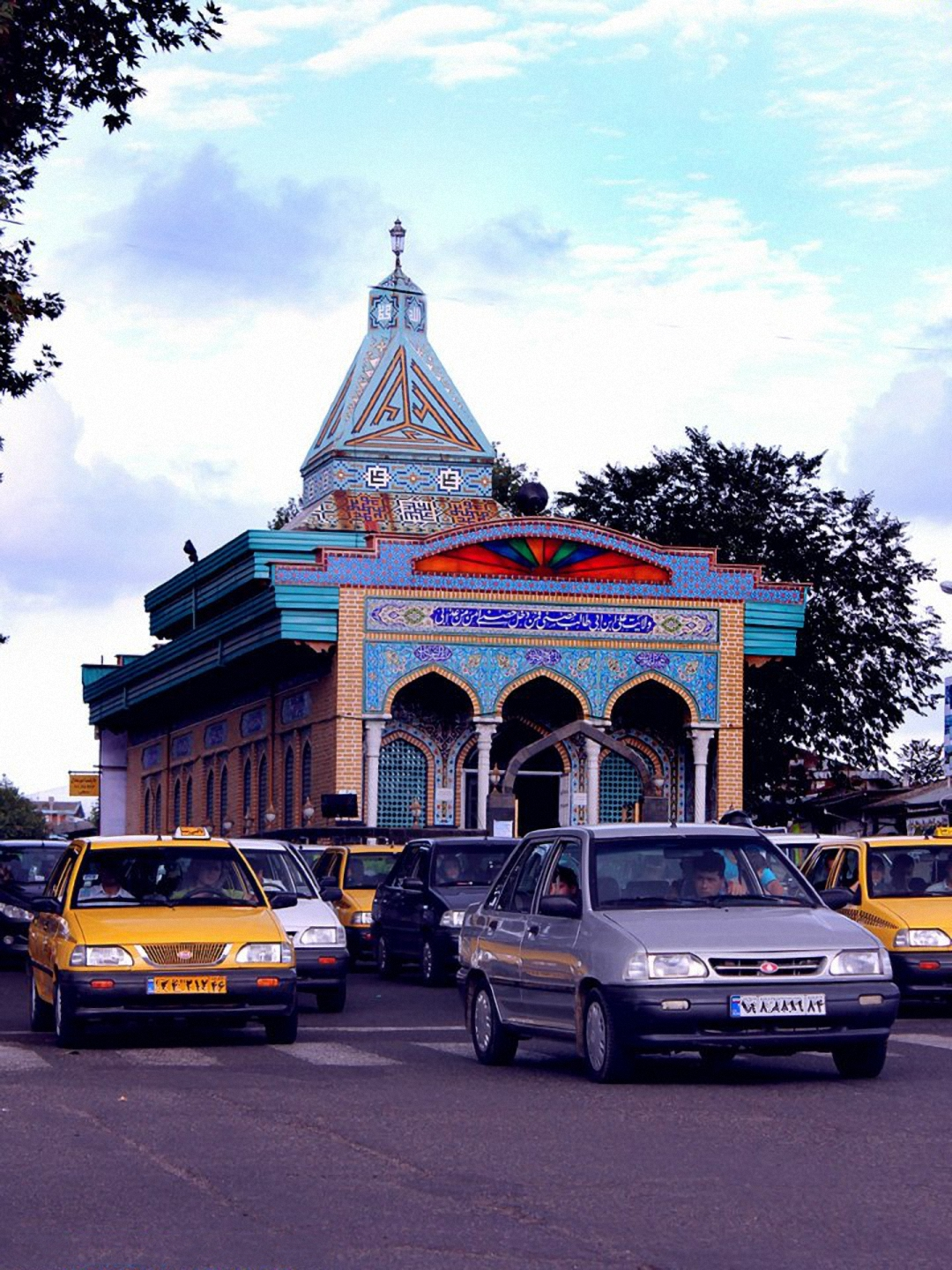
Tomb of Dana-ye Ali, a famous resident of a village in Rasht

=== Timeline ===
- 682: Rasht was first mentioned in Umayyad historical documents.
- 1669: Stenka Razin, a Cossack warlord, plundered the city.
- 1714: Rasht destroyed by earthquake.
- 1722–1732: Occupation by the Russians due to the Russo-Persian War.
- 1901: A major epidemic plague devastates the city.
- 1917–1920: The Russian and British armed forces fight in the port city of Bandar-e Anzali and Rasht. The British retreat and the Russians occupy the area.
- 1920–1921: The short-lived Gilan Soviet Socialist Republic was established with its capital in Rasht.
- 1937: A revolt, sparked by the desire to collect a "road tax" from the Russians, was suppressed.
- 1974: First university established in Rasht.

Rasht was first mentioned in Umayyad historical documents in 682 CE. It has seen the Sassanid era, the Rashidun conquest, the armies of Peter the Great and later Russian rulers, and British colonialism. The people of Rasht also played a major role in the Constitutional Revolution of Iran.

Rasht has, along with regions around Tabriz and Tehran, one of the earliest industry plants during the last quarter of the 19th century, prominently in fields such as fishing, caviar production, the Caspian sea oil pipeline construction and textiles. During the 20th century, until the mid-70s, Gilan and the Rasht region was the third-ranking industrial city in Iran by number of workers and per capita productivity. It lost its cultural and industrial status to a large extent after the 1970s.

The people of Rasht played a prominent role in instigation and radicalization of the Persian Constitutional Revolution (1905–1907). Rasht is the birthplace of Mīrzā Kūchak Khān, one of the leading figures of the Constitutional Revolution. His own movement in Gilan, which went by the name of Jangalis, represented a pro-modern and social democratic program for reformation of Muslim rituals and traditions. Mirza established the short-lived Persian Socialist Soviet Republic in 1920 after the defeat of the constitutional forces and in coalition with Iranian communists.

The republic had the support of the newly established Russian Red Army. The Soviet Government, after a turn of military and political strategy proposed by Trotsky, withdrew its support and the republic itself was tormented by the inner conflicts between the newly established Iranian Communist Party (1919) and the Jangalis and other factions. The republic was finally defeated by the Iranian army under the command of Reza Shah.

The first national library of Iran was established in Rasht under the Qajar dynasty. Nasim-e-Shomal, the first modern newspaper of Iran after the constitutional revolution, has been initially published in Rasht. First Public Library of Iran was built in Rasht City. First Branch of the First Iranian Bank (Sepah Bank) was located in Rasht City. First branch of 24/7 pharmacy (Karoon pharmacy) was built in Rasht City. First school for girls and first fire station in Iran were also built in Rasht City. The city of Rasht was the center of Gilan and the center of the first province of the country.

During the Qajar period, along with economic development between Iran and Russia, Noghan trade and other products expanded. Thus, Rasht became the gateway to Europe in the 19th century. Grigoriy Melgunov, a Russian orientalist and writer who visited Rasht at the end of 1860, wrote in his published notes that the city at that time had 5463 houses, 1021 shops, 22 mosques, 34 schools and 17 bathhouses, and a population of 27,314. At that time, Rasht's political credibility was such that the Russian, British, and Ottoman governments had consulates in Rasht.

=== Modern day ===
Rasht is turning into an industrialized town like most of the Iranian large cities and province capitals. Enjoying the Kadus International Hotel and hundreds of tourist attractions, Rasht receives thousands of foreign tourists annually, mostly from Austria, Germany, Netherlands, France, Australia, Japan and African countries like Senegal and Cameroon as well as countries from Oceania like Micronesia.

Rasht is known for its famous municipal building, located in the Square of Municipality, which was constructed circa 1900, and has been renovated each year. Due to the high amount of humidity in Rasht which damages and destroys the aged buildings, the native, older architectural texture of Rasht is gradually being replaced with modern skyscrapers and apartments.

The culture of consumerism is prevalent among the people of Rasht as a cultural and urban center which is historically engaged in close commercial and political ties with the United Kingdom, Russia and France. Due to this background which makes the inhabitants much familiar with the industrial, cultural and political developments of the west, the finance and credit institutions are more willing to open representative offices and bureaus in Rasht and it has made the city a center of various banks and financial organizations.

There are many commercial centers, malls and financial institutions in Rasht including one branch of the Exports Development Bank of Iran. The directors of national Iranian or non-Iranian banks have invested to construct attractive and modern buildings for their offices in Rasht.

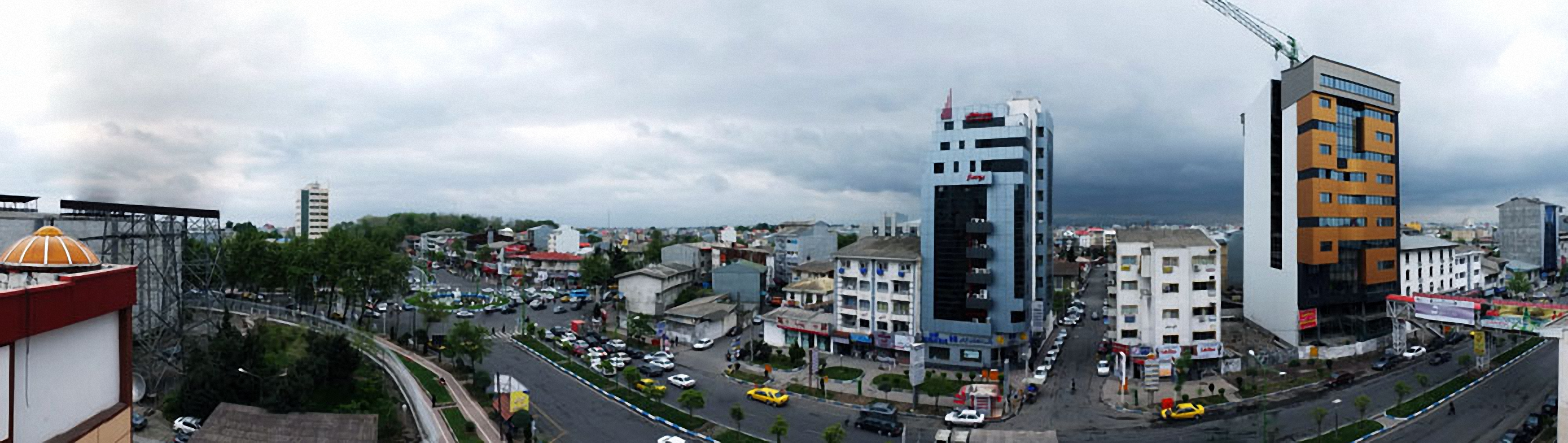
A panoramic photo of Boosar, neighborhood in Rasht

Since the Islamic Revolution of 1979 in Iran, there have always been requests on behalf of Russian, Turkish and Azerbaijani banks to open branches in Rasht and that is why the city is endowed as the "gate of Europe" in Iran. The head consulate of the Russian Federation government is located in Rasht and some of the other Caspian region countries are also keen to establish representative headquarters in Rasht alongside their embassies in Tehran.

Some evidences are the University of Gilan which was constructed jointly by the governments of Iran and West Germany about 40 years ago, the building of IRIB representatives in Rasht which was constructed jointly by the Iranian and Belgian engineers.

On January 8 and 9, 2026, during the 2025–2026 Iranian protests, the Iranian government perpetrated the 2026 Rasht massacre in trying to suppress the anti-government protests. According to the HRANA, at least 392 people have been killed in Rasht.

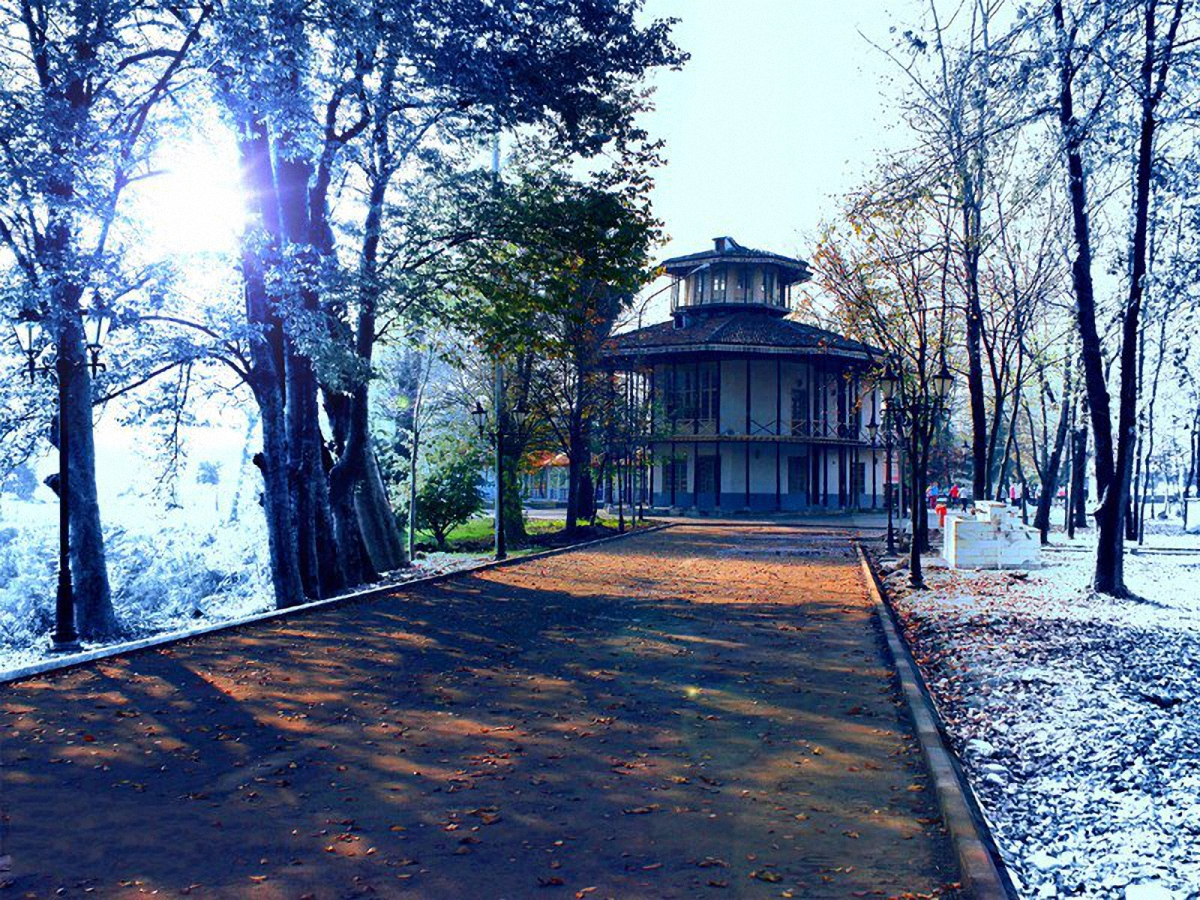
Kolah Farangi Mansion

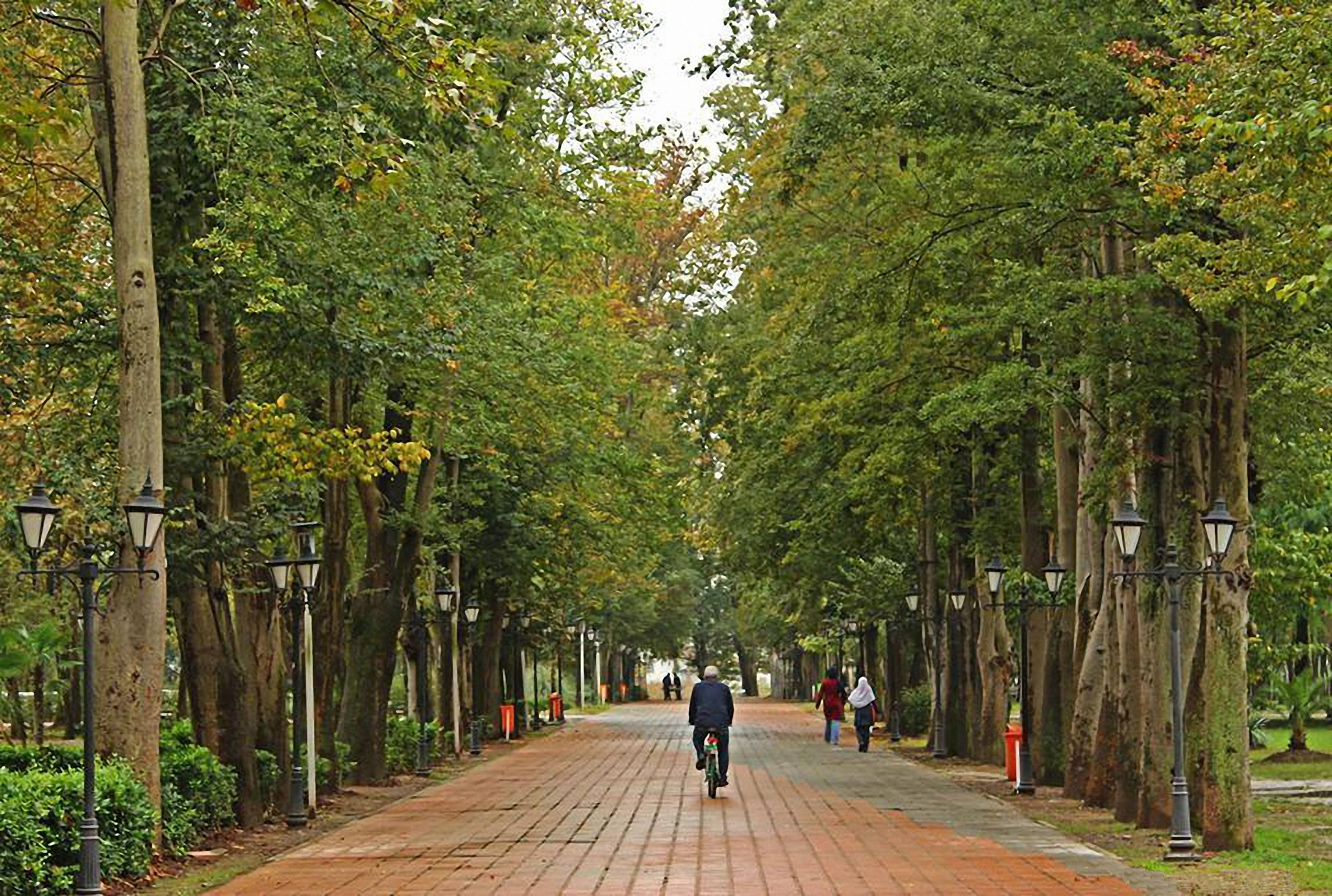
Mohtasham Park in Rasht

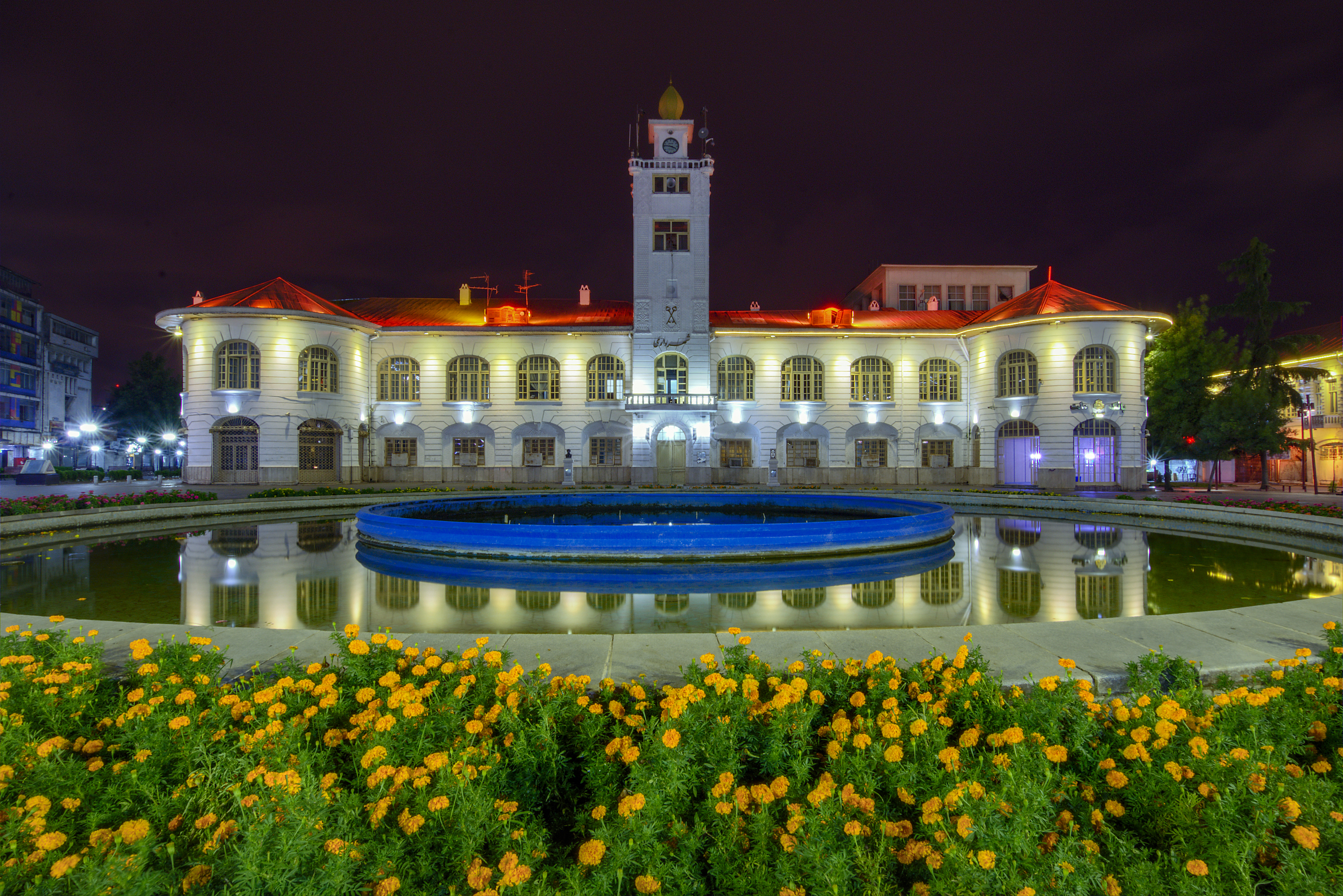
Rasht Municipality

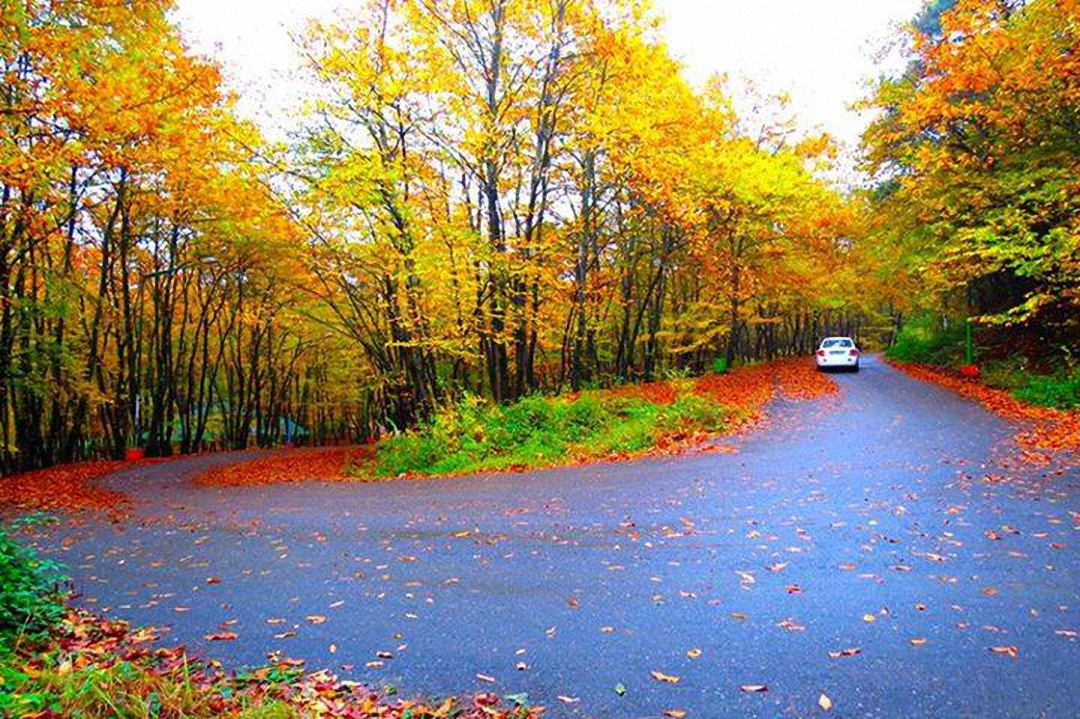
Rasht Saravan Park

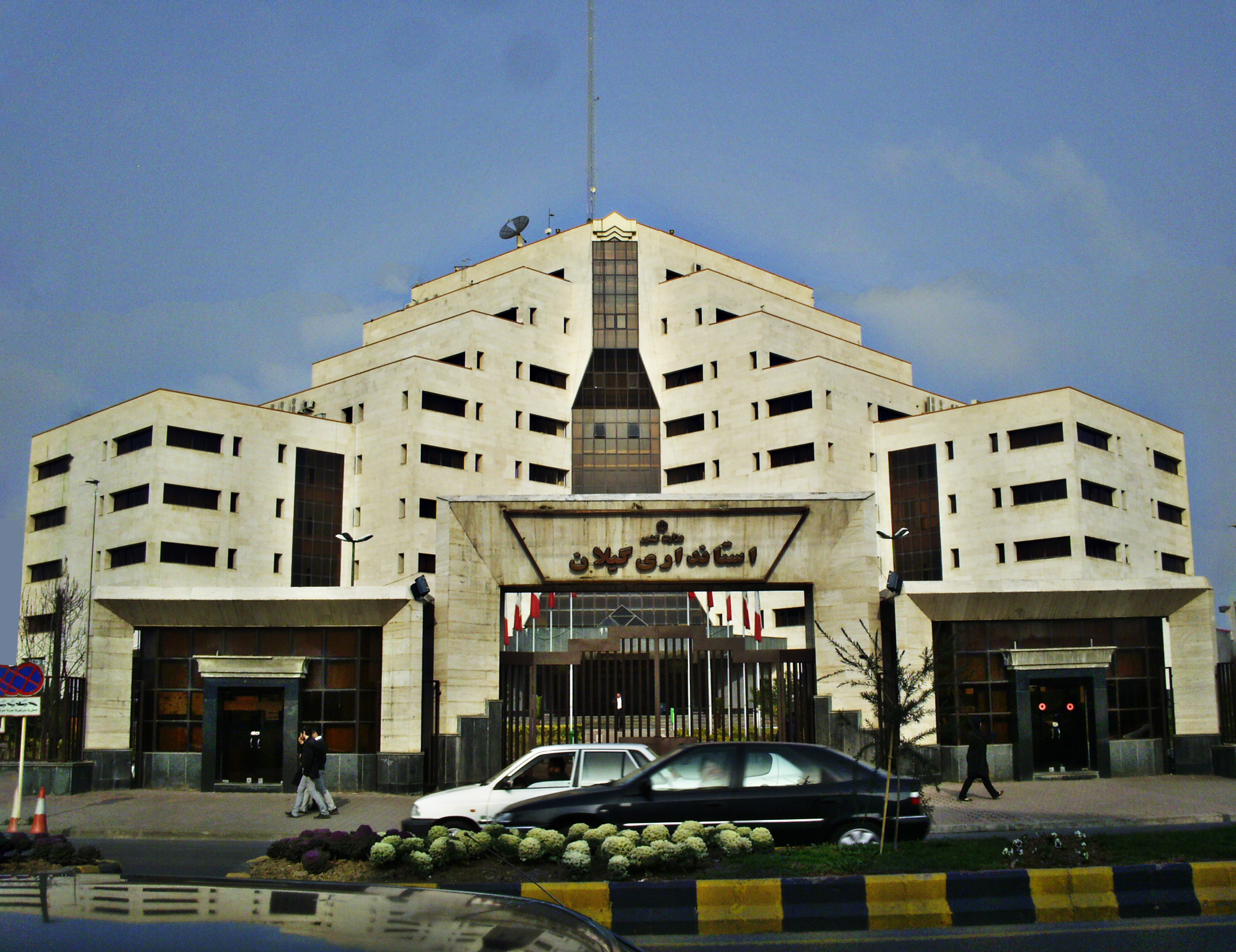
Governor Building of Guilan in Rasht

=== First of Iran ===
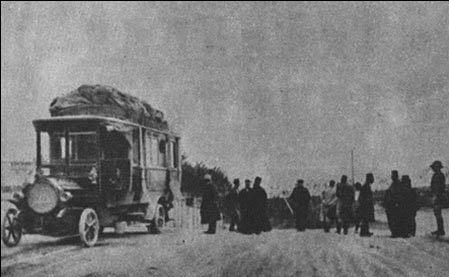
First bus in Iran, in the city of Rasht, imported by a Belgian merchant.

- The first branch of Bank Sepah and first Bank of Iran was established in Rasht in 1925
- The first girls' school in Iran was established in Rasht
- The first day & night pharmacy in Iran was established in Rasht
- The first sanatorium for the elderly and disabled in Iran was established in Rasht
- The first National Library of Iran was established in Rasht in 1920
- The first bus Iran arrived in Rasht
- The first city in which the sewage system was established
- The first city in which the Russian, British, French and Ottoman governments opened their consulates and had political representatives.
- The first silk factory in Iran
- The first national hospital in Iran named Poursina Hospital
- The first classical theater in Iran

=== Streets and boulevards ===
- Golsar Street
- Imam Ali Boulevard
- Shahid Chamran Boulevard
- Ayatollah Taleghani Boulevard
- Resalat Street
- Shohaday-e Gomnam Boulevard
- Ostadsara Street
- Esteghamat Street
- Deylaman Boulevard
- Moallem Boulevard
- Imam Khomeini Boulevard
- Valiasr Street
- Enghelab Street
- Azadi Street
- Azadegan Boulevard
- Shahid Ansari Street
- Farhang Street
- Parastar Boulevard
- Bastani Shoaar Street
- Afakhra Street
- Pasdaran Street
- 22 Bahman Boulevard
- Alamolhoda Street
- Saadi Street
- Tohid Street
- Navab Street
- Gilan Boulevard
- Gholipour Boulevard
- Habibzadeh Boulevard
- Ansari Boulevard
- Suleman Darab Boulevard
- Takhti Street
- Bisotun Street
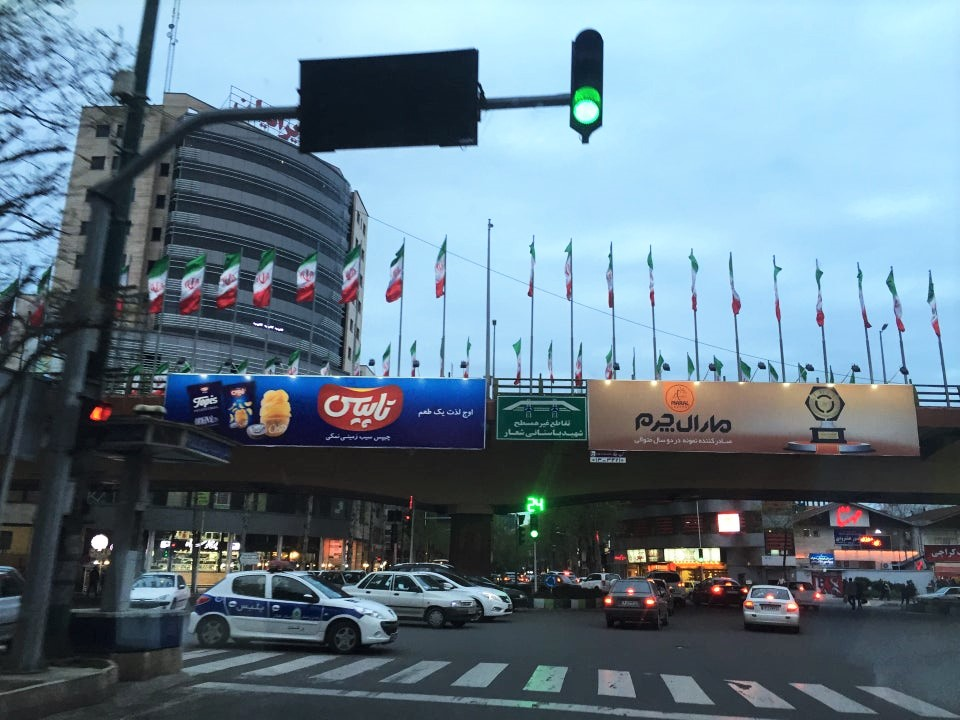
Golsar Street

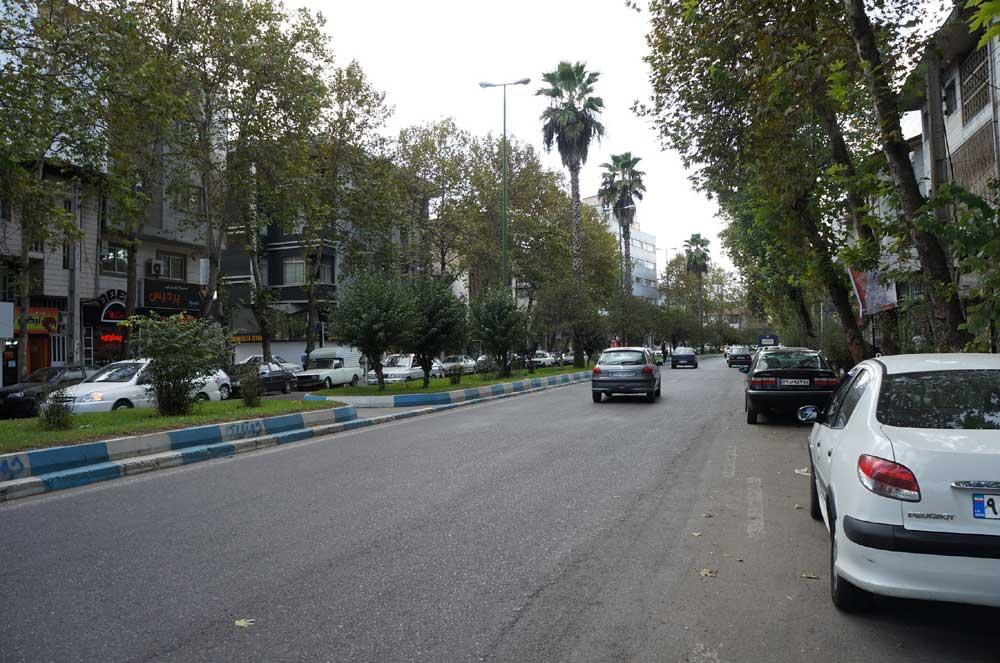
Golsar Street

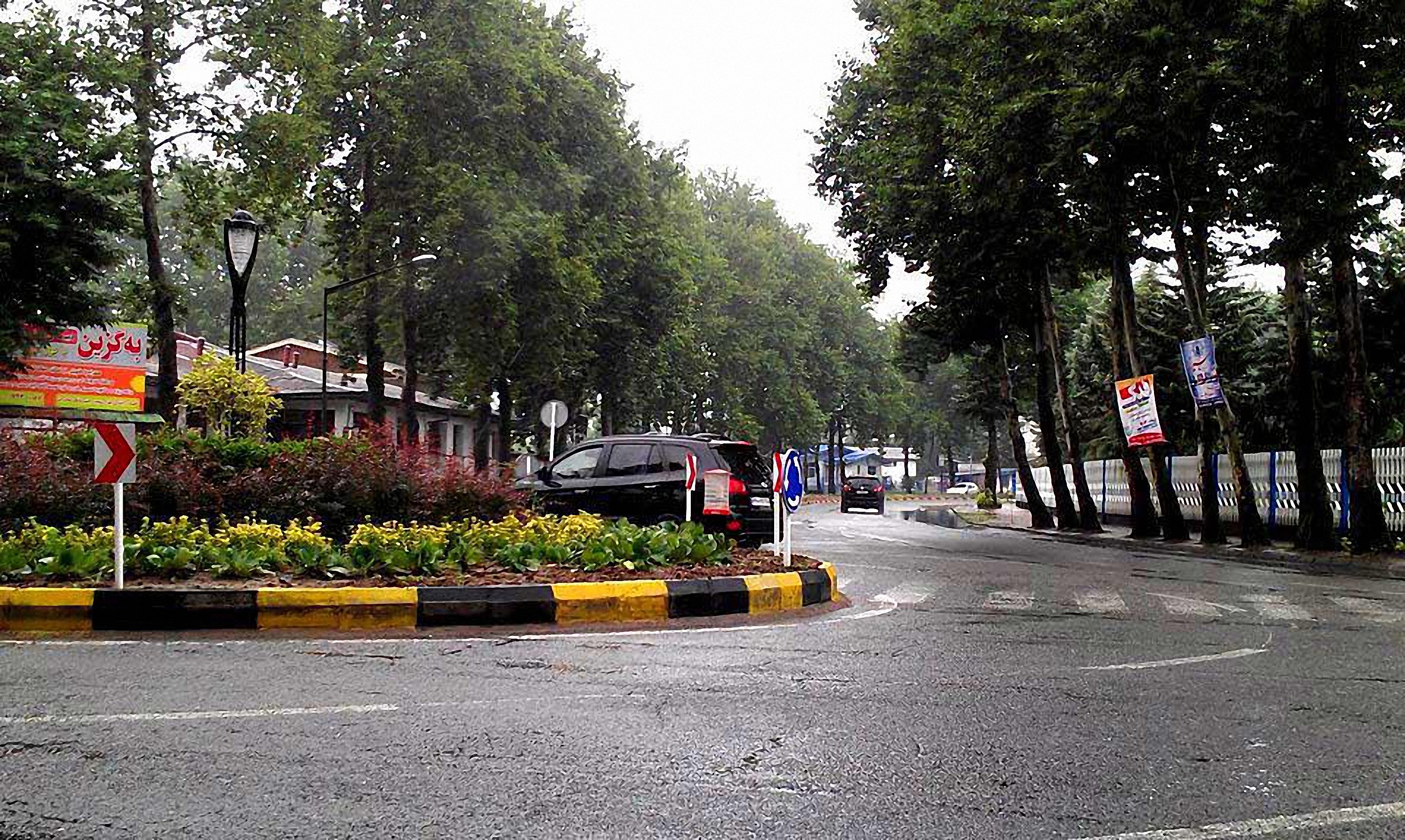
Gilan Street

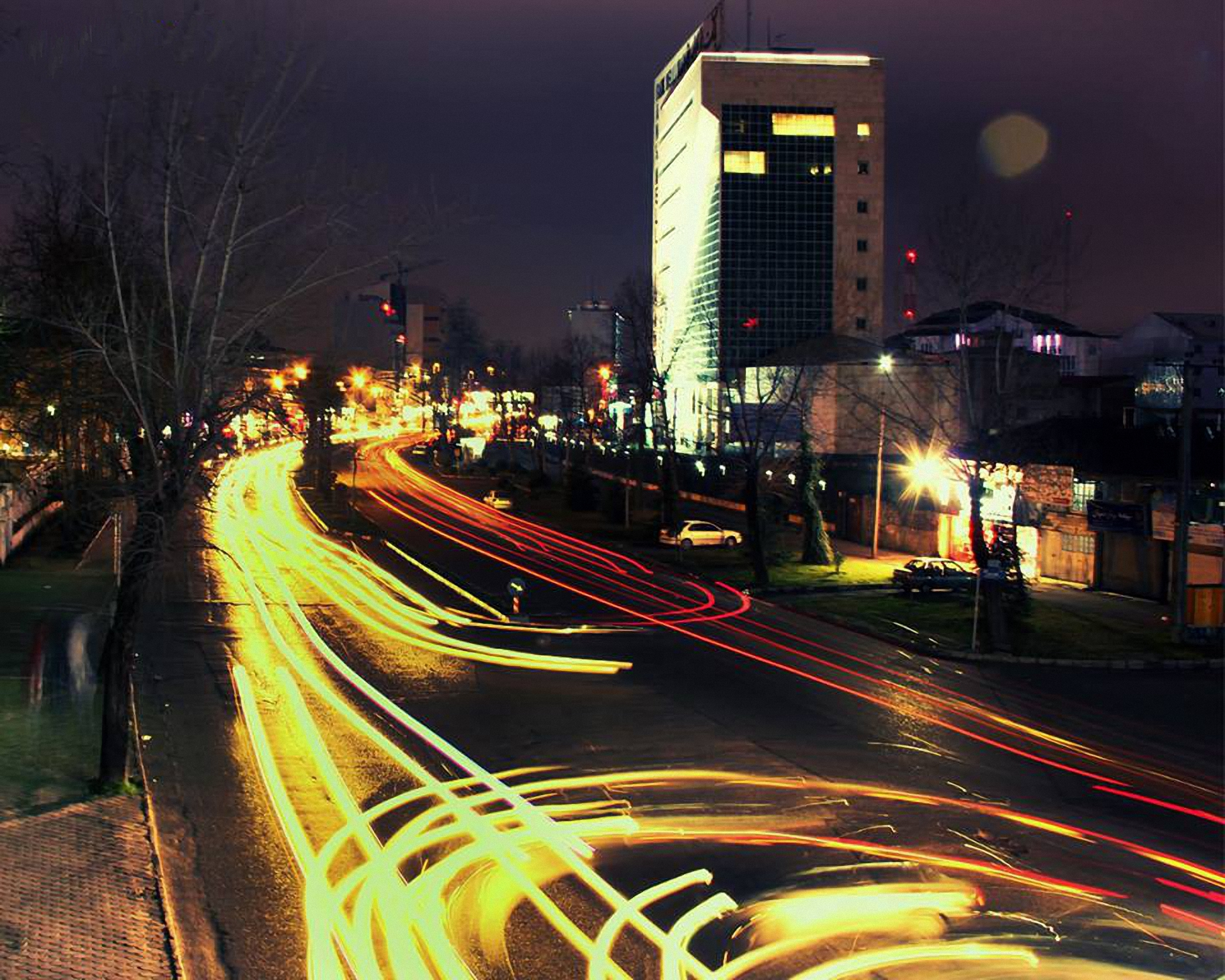
Ansari Street

== Demographics ==
=== Population ===
Historical population
Year	Pop.	±% p.a.
1986	290,897	—
1996	417,748	+3.69%
2006	551,161	+2.81%
2011	639,951	+3.03%
2016	679,995	+1.22%

The city of Rasht is the most populated city in the north of the country and one of the metropolises of Iran. At the time of the 2006 National Census, the city's population was 551,161 in 159,983 households. The following census in 2011 counted 639,951 people in 204,054 households. The 2016 census measured the population of the city as 679,995 people in 228,142 households.

=== Language ===
People of Rasht are mostly Gilaks (98.2%) and they speak Rashti variety of Western Gilaki language.

== Climate ==
Rasht has a humid subtropical climate (Köppen: Cfa, Trewartha: Cf). The climate is one of the wettest in Iran, with warm summers and cool winters, sometimes with snow. The average humidity is above 80%, contrasting heavily with cities in many other parts of Iran. Sunshine hours, averaging roughly 1,700 per year, is lower than in most places in Iran and also compared to most places at this latitude.

Climate data for Rasht, (normals and extremes 1991-2020)
Month	Jan	Feb	Mar	Apr	May	Jun	Jul	Aug	Sep	Oct	Nov	Dec	Year
Record high °C (°F)	27.5 (81.5)	29.8 (85.6)	38.0 (100.4)	37.4 (99.3)	38.6 (101.5)	35.2 (95.4)	36.6 (97.9)	38.4 (101.1)	40.0 (104.0)	37.4 (99.3)	32.3 (90.1)	29.2 (84.6)	40.0 (104.0)
Mean daily maximum °C (°F)	11.6 (52.9)	11.5 (52.7)	14.7 (58.5)	19.1 (66.4)	24.4 (75.9)	28.5 (83.3)	30.5 (86.9)	30.9 (87.6)	27.2 (81.0)	22.8 (73.0)	17.0 (62.6)	13.3 (55.9)	21.0 (69.7)
Daily mean °C (°F)	7.1 (44.8)	7.0 (44.6)	9.7 (49.5)	14.0 (57.2)	19.6 (67.3)	23.8 (74.8)	25.7 (78.3)	25.7 (78.3)	22.3 (72.1)	17.9 (64.2)	12.5 (54.5)	8.9 (48.0)	16.2 (61.1)
Mean daily minimum °C (°F)	3.8 (38.8)	3.9 (39.0)	6.6 (43.9)	10.5 (50.9)	15.9 (60.6)	19.8 (67.6)	21.8 (71.2)	21.7 (71.1)	19.0 (66.2)	14.6 (58.3)	9.3 (48.7)	5.6 (42.1)	12.7 (54.9)
Record low °C (°F)	−11.6 (11.1)	−9.0 (15.8)	−2.1 (28.2)	−0.2 (31.6)	3.8 (38.8)	12.1 (53.8)	14.8 (58.6)	14.8 (58.6)	11.5 (52.7)	7.8 (46.0)	−3.6 (25.5)	−3.5 (25.7)	−11.6 (11.1)
Average precipitation mm (inches)	131.4 (5.17)	131.6 (5.18)	108.3 (4.26)	73.1 (2.88)	41.5 (1.63)	41.7 (1.64)	52.3 (2.06)	71.8 (2.83)	159.3 (6.27)	200.4 (7.89)	218.2 (8.59)	153.2 (6.03)	1,382.8 (54.43)
Average extreme snow depth cm (inches)	6.09 (2.40)	4.46 (1.76)	0.62 (0.24)	0.0 (0.0)	0.0 (0.0)	0.0 (0.0)	0.0 (0.0)	0.0 (0.0)	0.0 (0.0)	0.0 (0.0)	0.53 (0.21)	0.6 (0.2)	6.09 (2.40)
Average precipitation days (≥ 1 mm)	10	10.2	10.1	7.3	6.2	4.1	3.9	5.9	8.7	10.4	11.3	9.9	98
Average relative humidity (%)	85	85	84	82	80	77	77	79	84	87	88	86	83
Average dew point °C (°F)	4.2 (39.6)	4.1 (39.4)	6.7 (44.1)	10.5 (50.9)	15.6 (60.1)	19.2 (66.6)	21.1 (70.0)	21.4 (70.5)	19.4 (66.9)	15.5 (59.9)	10.2 (50.4)	6.2 (43.2)	12.8 (55.1)
Mean monthly sunshine hours	97	91	106	128	190	234	234	210	143	124	98	93	1,748
Source: NOAA IRIMO(snow depth 2004-2023)

Climate data for Rasht (1956-2010, (Note: Afternoon humidity measured at 09:00UTC.(12:30 IRST)) records 1956-2026)
Month	Jan	Feb	Mar	Apr	May	Jun	Jul	Aug	Sep	Oct	Nov	Dec	Year
Record high °C (°F)	30.0 (86.0)	34.4 (93.9)	38.0 (100.4)	37.4 (99.3)	38.6 (101.5)	37.0 (98.6)	37.0 (98.6)	38.4 (101.1)	40.0 (104.0)	37.4 (99.3)	36.0 (96.8)	32.0 (89.6)	40.0 (104.0)
Mean daily maximum °C (°F)	11.0 (51.8)	11.2 (52.2)	13.5 (56.3)	19.0 (66.2)	24.0 (75.2)	28.1 (82.6)	30.3 (86.5)	30.2 (86.4)	26.7 (80.1)	22.1 (71.8)	17.5 (63.5)	13.5 (56.3)	20.6 (69.1)
Daily mean °C (°F)	6.7 (44.1)	7.0 (44.6)	9.4 (48.9)	14.3 (57.7)	19.2 (66.6)	23.2 (73.8)	25.3 (77.5)	25.3 (77.5)	22.2 (72.0)	17.7 (63.9)	12.9 (55.2)	8.9 (48.0)	16.0 (60.8)
Mean daily minimum °C (°F)	2.4 (36.3)	2.7 (36.9)	5.3 (41.5)	9.6 (49.3)	14.4 (57.9)	18.2 (64.8)	20.4 (68.7)	20.3 (68.5)	17.6 (63.7)	13.3 (55.9)	8.3 (46.9)	4.4 (39.9)	11.4 (52.5)
Record low °C (°F)	−19 (−2)	−18 (0)	−6 (21)	−2 (28)	3.6 (38.5)	5 (41)	11 (52)	9 (48)	7 (45)	1 (34)	−4 (25)	−10 (14)	−19 (−2)
Average precipitation mm (inches)	132.4 (5.21)	116.0 (4.57)	112.5 (4.43)	64.8 (2.55)	51.5 (2.03)	43.0 (1.69)	42.3 (1.67)	68.4 (2.69)	152.5 (6.00)	211.5 (8.33)	186.8 (7.35)	155.8 (6.13)	1,337.5 (52.65)
Average precipitation days	13.4	12.9	15.4	12.3	10.9	7.3	6.3	8.6	12.0	13.8	12.8	13.0	138.7
Average snowy days	2.5	2.8	1.3	0.1	0.0	0.0	0.0	0.0	0.0	0.0	0.1	0.9	7.7
Average relative humidity (%)	84	85	84	80	78	74	74	77	82	86	85	85	81
Average afternoon relative humidity (%)	77	77	75	69	66	63	63	65	71	75	76	77	71
Average dew point °C (°F)	3.8 (38.8)	4.0 (39.2)	6.3 (43.3)	10.5 (50.9)	15.3 (59.5)	18.8 (65.8)	20.7 (69.3)	21.0 (69.8)	19.0 (66.2)	15.2 (59.4)	10.4 (50.7)	6.2 (43.2)	12.6 (54.7)
Mean monthly sunshine hours	91.7	86.7	91.2	122.0	174.0	213.2	222.1	187.7	140.2	118.3	100.2	89.6	1,636.9
Source: Shahrekord Meteorology Database, meteomanz (records since 2021)

== Culture ==
The city of Rash organizes annual art exhibitions, music concerts and international book fairs. Also the municipality kicks off sports, cultural or IT-related competitions. One of the most popular competition is the annual blogging competition which awards the top young bloggers each year.

Rasht has played a major role in Iranian history. It was Iran's gateway to Russia and Europe; therefore it was influenced by western architecture. Iran's first public library was built here and it was the first city in Iran where girls were allowed to go to school.

Iranian cities of Isfahan and Rasht were accepted to the UNESCO Creative Cities Network on December 11, 2015. Isfahan is registered because of its creative crafts and folk art; and Rasht because of its unique gastronomy. Rasht embroidery is a handicraft and art specific to the city and Gilan province.

On 4 January 2015, Rasht was selected as the political center of Gilan. The date 4 January was then included in the official calendar of the country as Rasht Day.

=== Cuisine ===
Some of the most popular foods in Rash are ashpal (roe), Mirza Ghassemi, vavishka (a type of haggis), nargesi, baghala ghatogh, and Reshteh khoshkar is a well-known sweet. Zeitoun Parvardeh is a kind of delicacy prepared from olives and pomegranates; it is a popular seasoning in the city.

=== Rose de Rescht ===
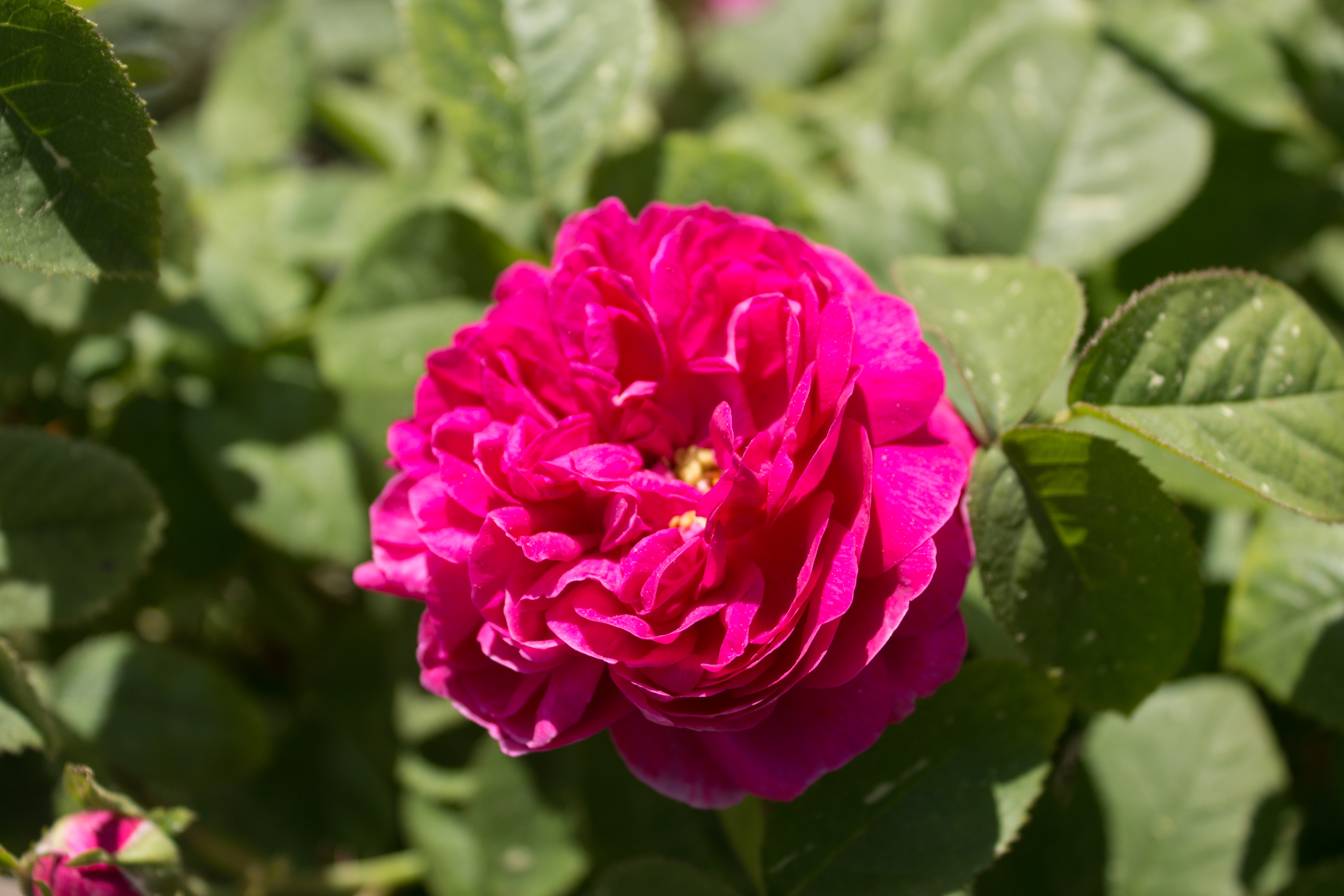
Rosa 'de Rescht'

The Rosa 'de Rescht', presents an interesting historical background story. This rose, originating in Iran, was reported at the end of 19th century in England, but was then forgotten. It was rediscovered near the Iranian provincial capital of Rascht by Miss Nancy Lindsay in 1945, and was brought back to the United Kingdom, where it was re-introduced around 1950. Today it is shown in the Victorian Class, winning many trophies.

=== Sports ===
One of the most popular sports in Rasht is football. The most famous club are the Damash Gilan who play in the Azadegan League or Sepidrood Rasht who play in the Persian Tier 2 and 3 League. Damash Gilan is the newer version of former Pegah football club that belonged to the municipality of Rasht, but was purchased later by the mineral water factory of Damash and changed its name and properties to Damash Gilan.

The home stadium of Damash Gilan is Dr. Azodi Stadium which dates to almost 40 years ago, with a capacity of 11,000 people. Sardar Jangal Stadium is the city's second stadium.

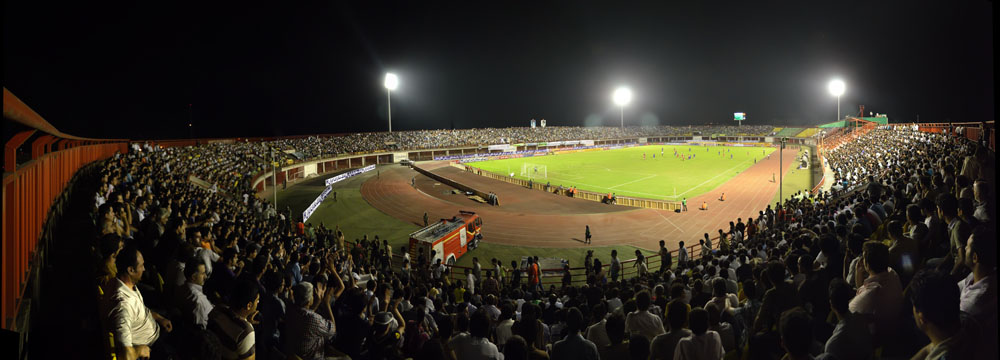
Sardar Jangal Stadium of Rasht

Following football, wrestling, judo and weightlifting are the most popular sports of youth in Rasht, due to the presence of Iranian wrestlers and weightlifters in international competitions like the Olympics. The two-time olympics Gold medal winner Hossein Rezazadeh has inspired the Rasht youth to try Weightlifting as a professional job. Asghar Ebrahimi who was the squad captain of Iranian weightlifting team at the 2008 Olympics is from Rasht and was inspired by Hossein Rezazadeh to start weightlifting.

== Colleges and universities ==
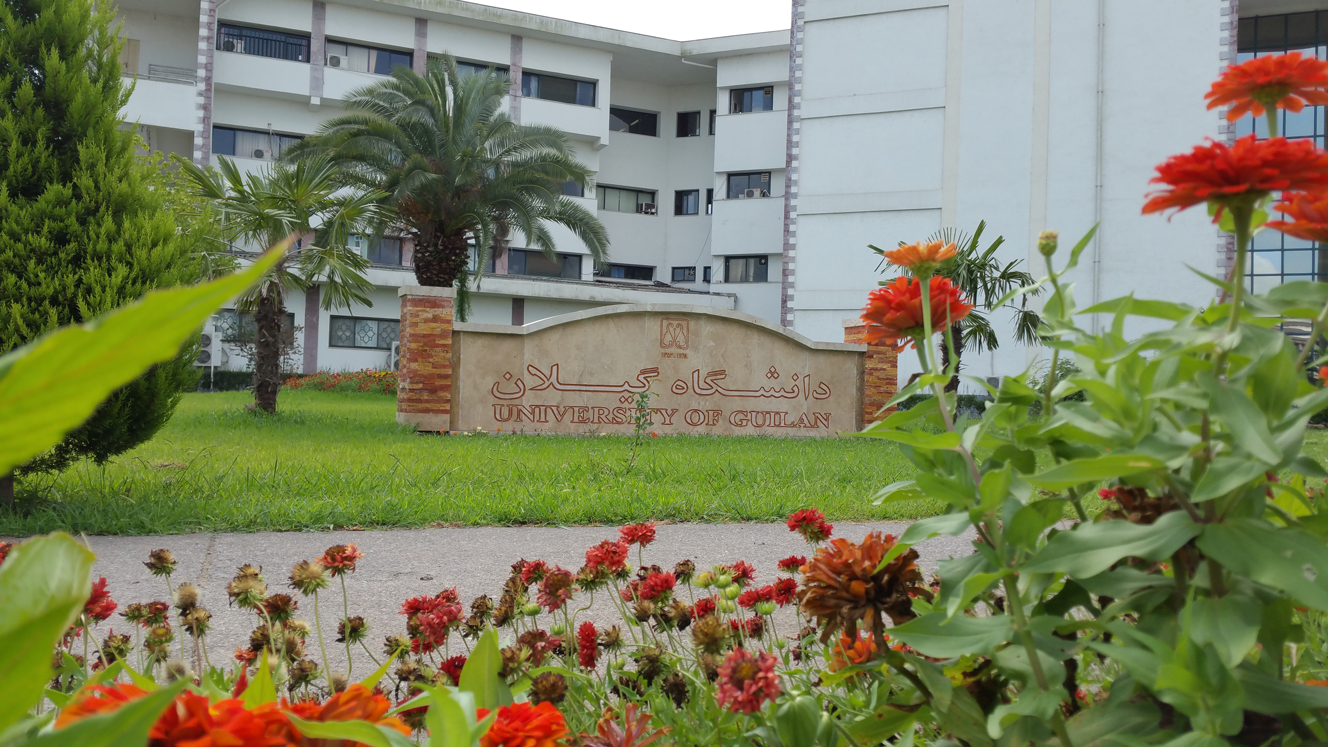
University of Guilan

- University of Gilan
- Gilan university of medical sciences
- Islamic Azad University of Rasht
- Jaber ebn Hayyan Institute of Higher Education
- Payame Noor University
- Institute of Higher Education for Academic Jihad of Rasht
- Guilan Technical & Vocational Training Organization
- Gilan Advanced Skills Training Center
- Rasht Technical and Vocational Institute
- Guilan University of Applied and Scientific Technology

== Economy ==
This city economical relevance is due to its geographical position (being located on the central plain and possessing large, fertile lands and soil, it is also the most important region of Iran in terms of rice cultivation), infrastructural position (being located among the Tehran–Qazvin-Anzali-Astara roads, in one hand, and the main road from Gilan to Mazandaran and the east of Gilan, on the other hand), political–administrative situation (situating as the capital city of Gilan province) and economic development, towns expansion and industrial factories and the following increase in the agricultural-commercial activities and in the number of science and technology centers.

The majority of residents of this city are active in service, trading and industrial jobs and paddy is one of the main activities of the villagers in this region.Rasht has long been one of the most prominent customs cities in Iran. This city used to be the only communication and trade route of Iran to Europe through the Anzali port. From the time of Shah Abbas II until the end of the Qajar rule, the city of Rasht was a large commercial center, and caravans stopped in this city to buy silk and sell their goods from In this way, they were sent to the ports of the Mediterranean Sea.

The presence of the Russian Consulate and then the British Consulate in Rasht caused the economic and social prosperity of this city, there was a representative of the Ministry of Foreign Affairs or a broker, a Russian consul, a French deputy consul, and a British deputy consul in this city, and apart from The ruler of Rasht, the agent of foreign affairs was also stationed in Rasht on behalf of the central government. During this period, Tomanians Russian Borrowing Bank and Trading House were active in Rasht consecutively.

At the same time, Rasht's foreign trade developed and some rashtites became millionaires, which lead to rasht becoming an aristocratic city during the Qajar period. The city is served by Refah Chain Stores Co., Iran Hyper Star, Isfahan City Center, Shahrvand Chain Stores Inc., Ofoq Kourosh chain store.

== Pharmaceutical industry ==
Rasht has a Faculty of Pharmacy under the auspices of Gilan University of Medical Sciences and several drug production centers, one of which is a center for the production of anti-cancer nano-drugs with 24 pens. Sobhan Daroo Co. is one of the successful pharmaceutical companies in Iran. And with more than 100 production licenses, it is currently the second largest producer in the country in terms of production volume. Sobhan Oncology Pharmaceutical Company is one of the modern and advanced production units of anti-cancer and chemotherapy products in the world.

== Health centers and hotels ==
Hotel

- Kadus Grand Hotel
- Shabestan Hotel
- Ordibehesht Hotel
- Ghadir Hotel
- Pamchal Hotel
- Pourya Hotel

Hospital

- Poursina Hospital
- Golsar Hospital
- Arya Hospital
- Pars Rasht Hospital
- Rasoul Akram Hospital
- Velayat Hospital
- Omid Hospital
- Razi University Hospital
- Qaem Hospital
- Al Zahra Hospital
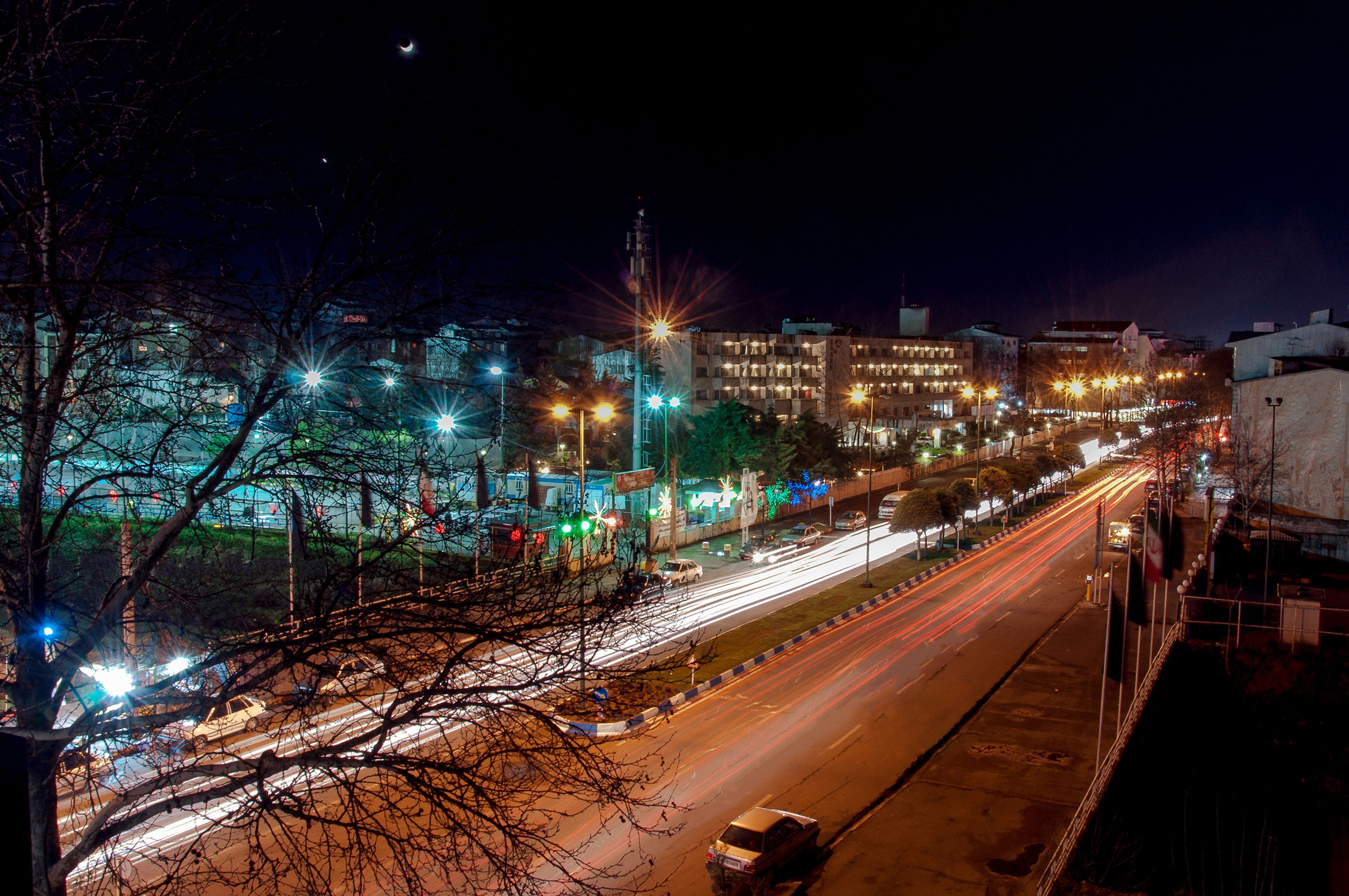
Kadus Grand Hotel

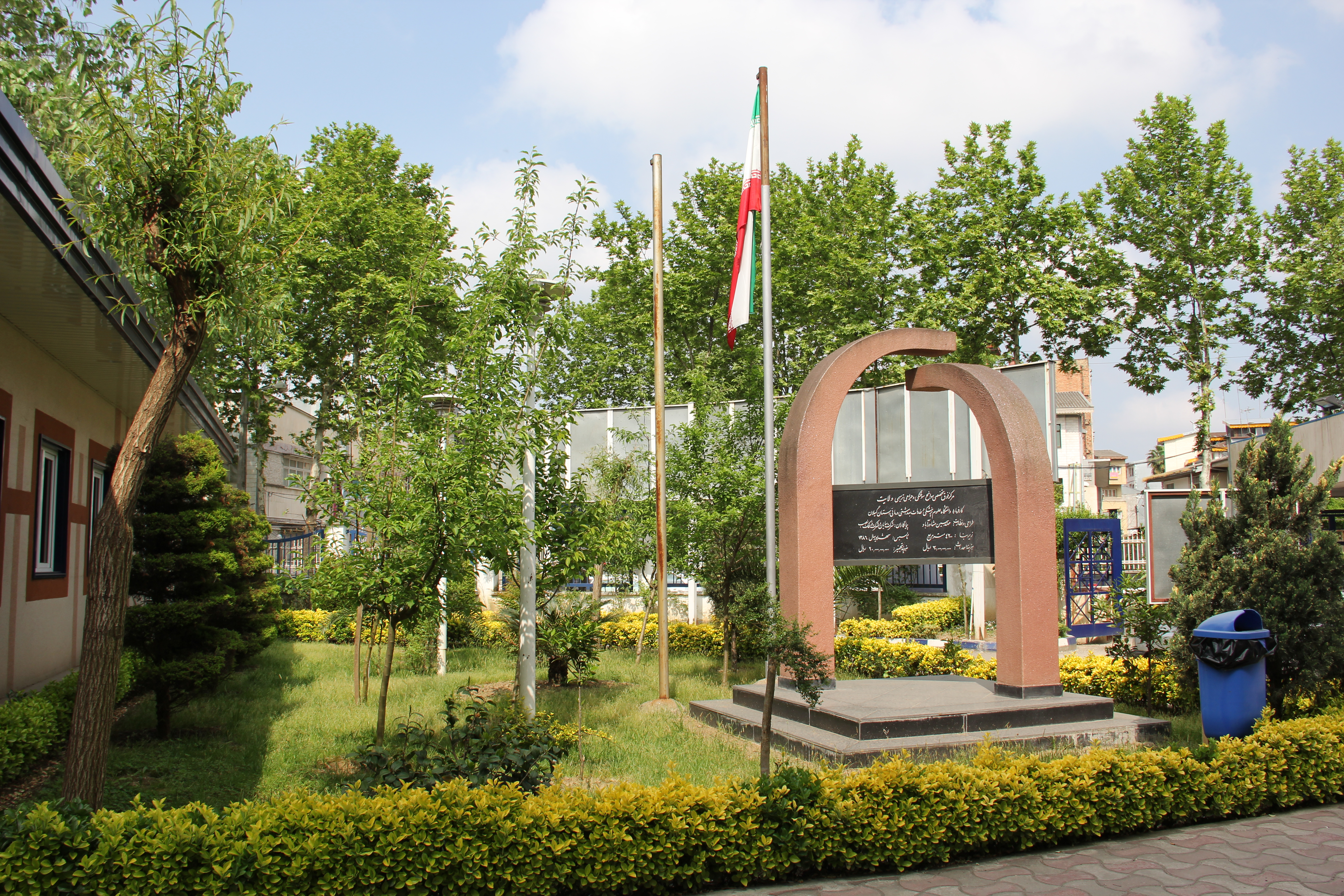
Velayat Hospital

== Transportation ==
=== Taxi ===
In 1947, 50 taxis were purchased from England by the order of Fakhr-ol-dowleh (daughter of Muzaffar al-Din Shah) and imported to Iran. In 1948, the first taxi entered Rasht by crossing the main street of the city due to his interest in Gilan. Rasht Metropolitan Taxi Organization has so far organized more than 9,500 taxis and private cars.

=== Railway ===
Rasht is served by Rasht railway station, which is located south of the city near the road to Jirdeh, Shaft. The railway passes through Alborz mountains and then Sefidrood river valley and is connected to Karaj and Qazvin on its way to Tehran. To the north the railway leads to Anzali free trade zone.

=== International airport ===
The Rasht International airport is the only airport in the province of Gilan and was established in 1969 with an approximate area of 220 hectares. At first, the airport just handled domestic flights to Tehran and Mashhad, but after it was renamed to Sardar Jangal International airport in 2007, additional routes were established.

The airport is in close affiliation with hundreds of flights by national and international airlines, including Mahan Air, Iran Air, Iran Aseman Airlines, Kish Air and receives more than 2000 flights annually.

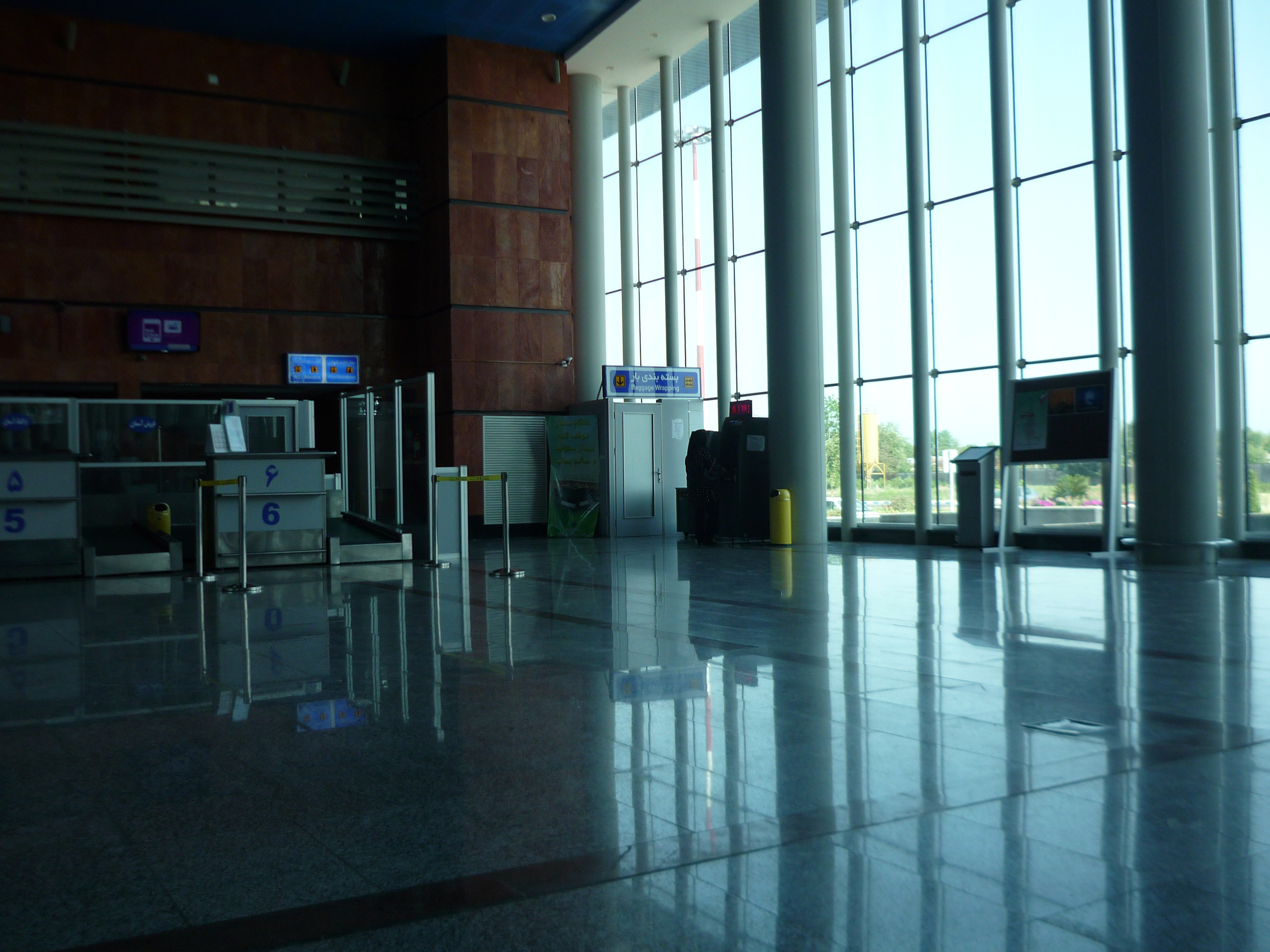
Rasht Airport

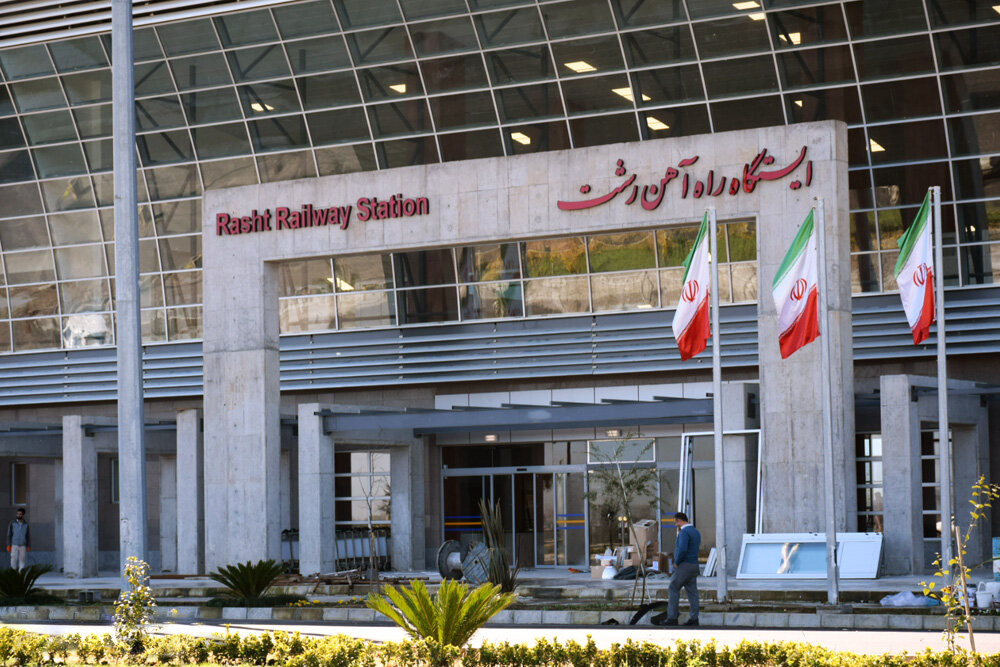
Rasht Railway Station

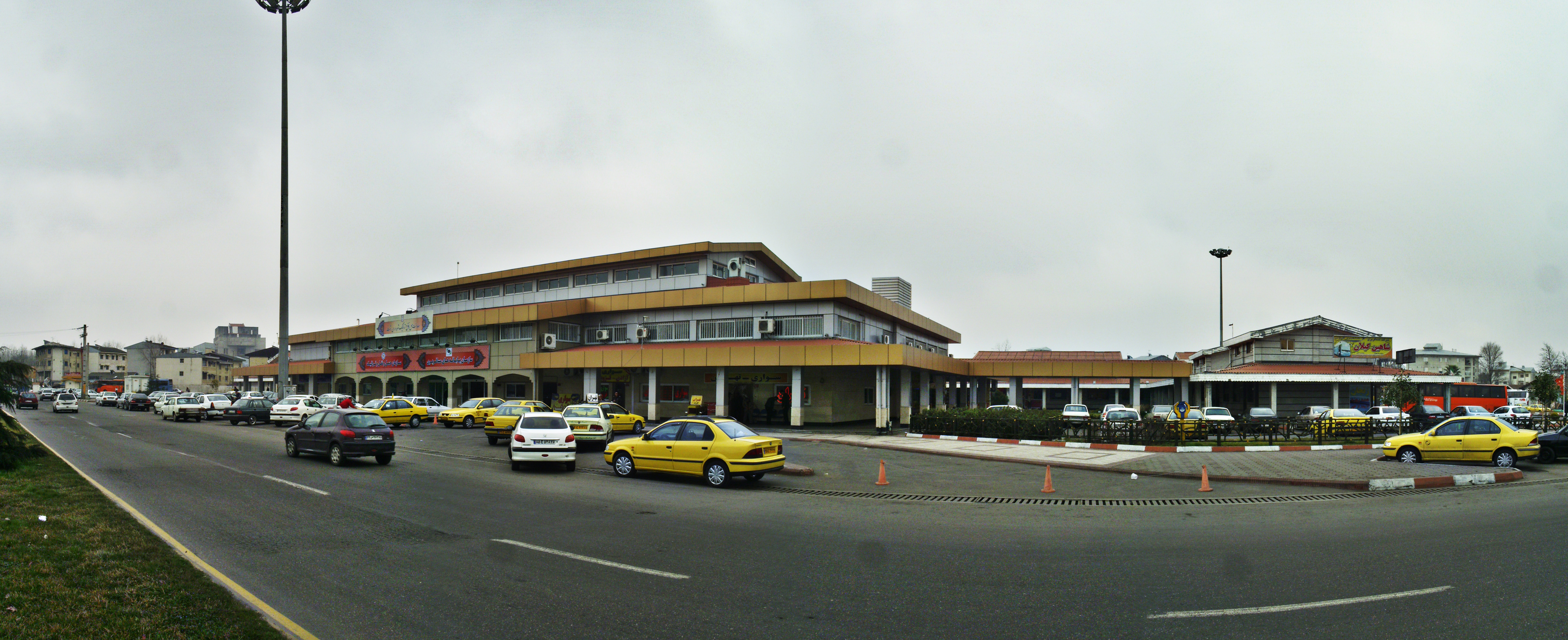
Terminal Rasht

== Historical and natural attractions ==
- Iran Hotel
- National Library
- Saravan Forest Park
- Hajj Samad Khan Mosque
- Haj Samiee Mosque
- Badyollah Mosque
- Emamzadeh Hashem
- Imamzadeh Ismail and Abbas
- Mellat Park
- Keshavarz Park
- Meshkat Park
- Towhid Park
- Golshan Mosque
- Kase Forushan Mosque
- Zargaran Mosque
- Abrishamchi House
- Mohtasham Caravanserai
- Ebrahim Pourdavoud Tomb
- Gurab-e Lishavandan
- Imamzadeh Bibi Zeynab
- Tomb Tower Danaye Ali
- Lat Carvansary
- Shahid Beheshti High School
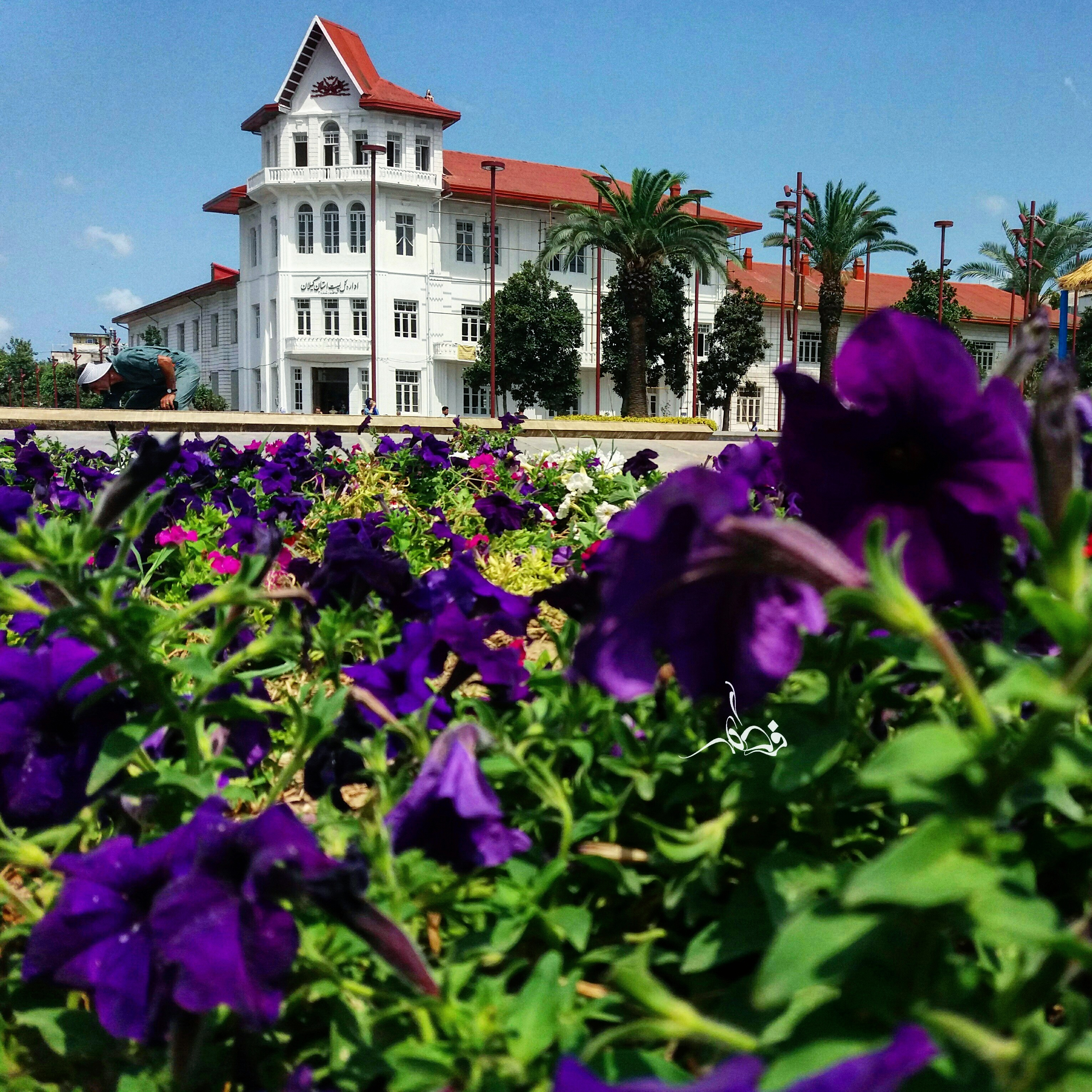
The Historical Building of Post office

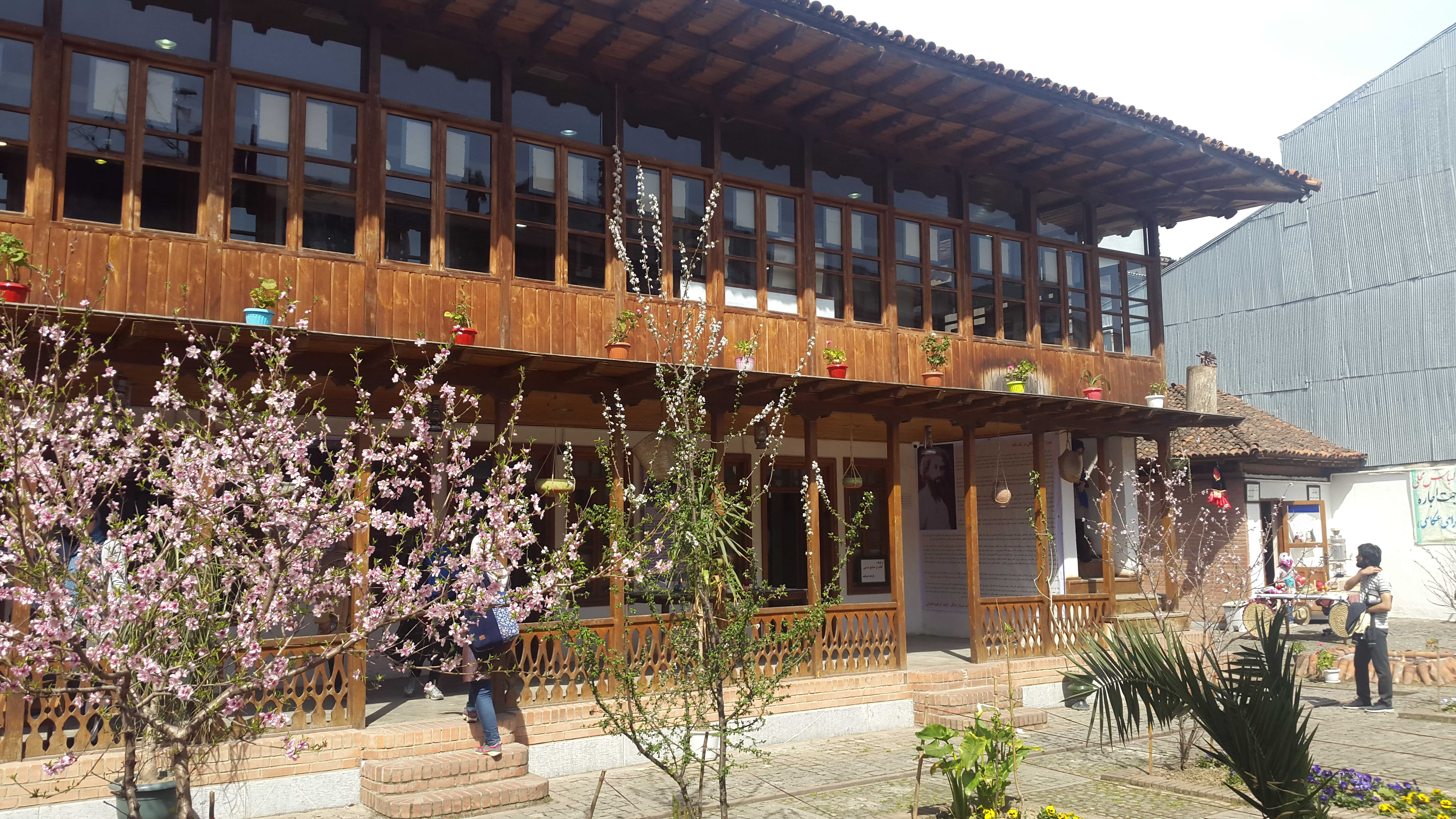
Mirza Kuchik Khan House

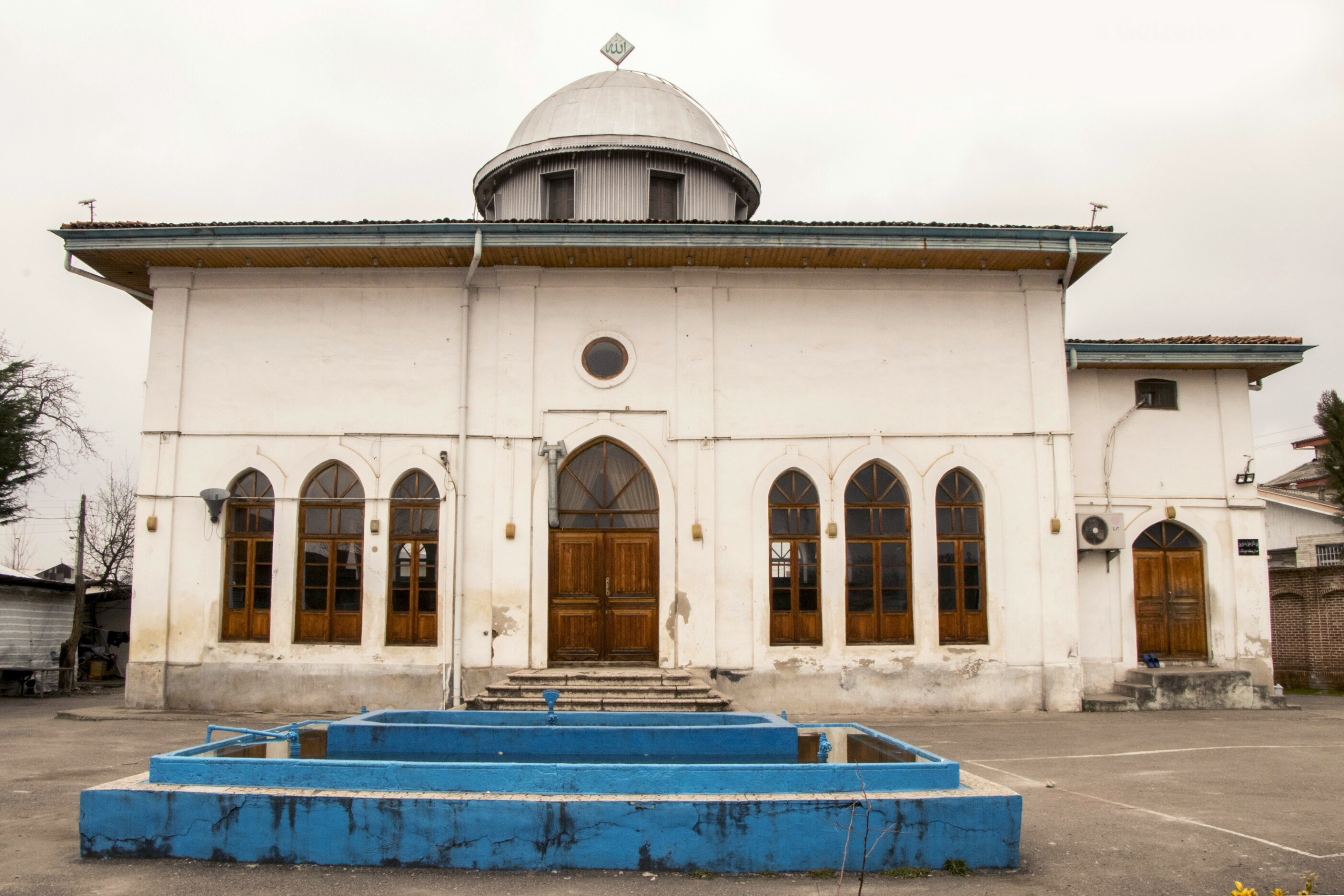
Hajj Samad Khan Mosque

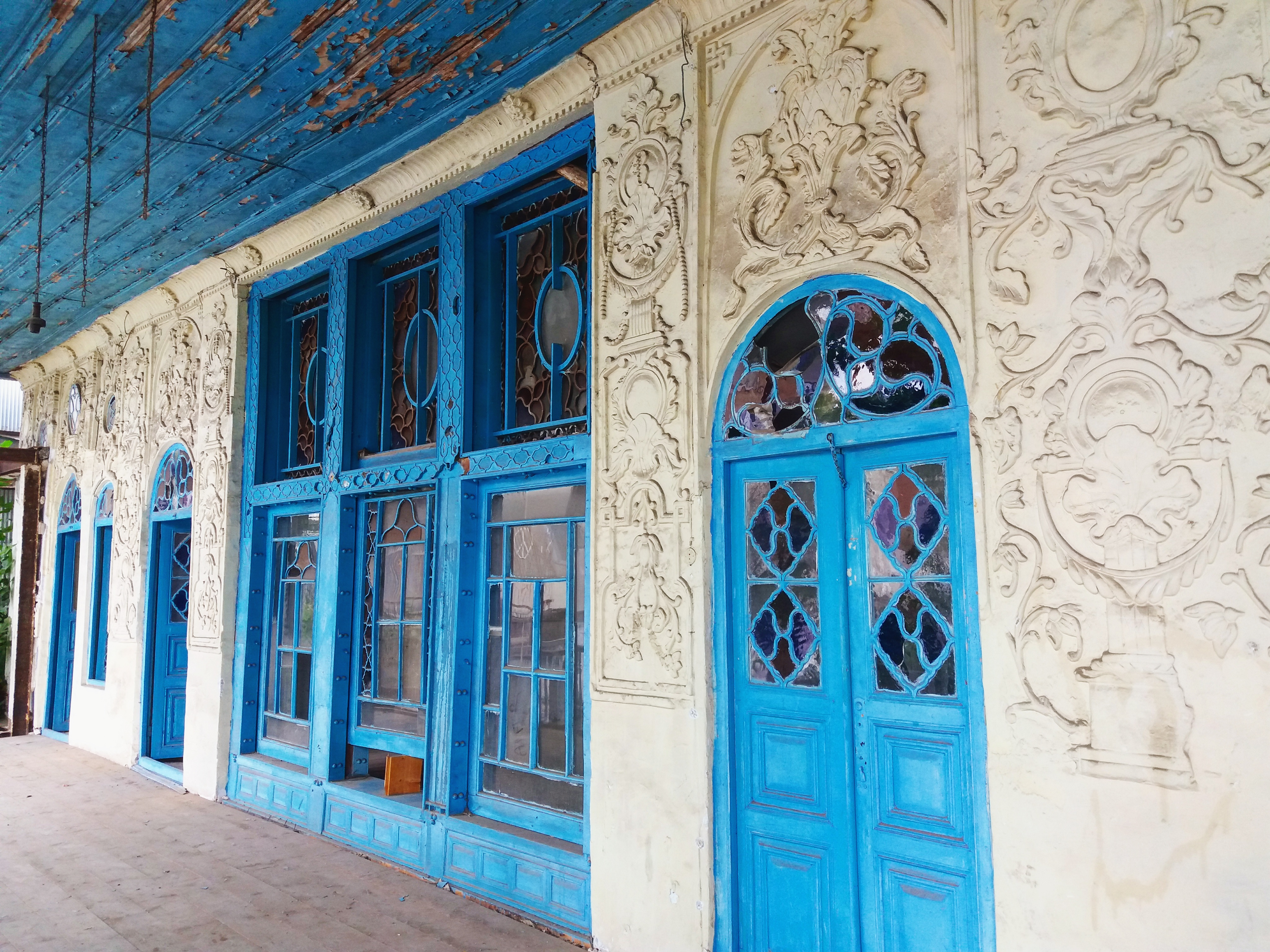
Avanesian House

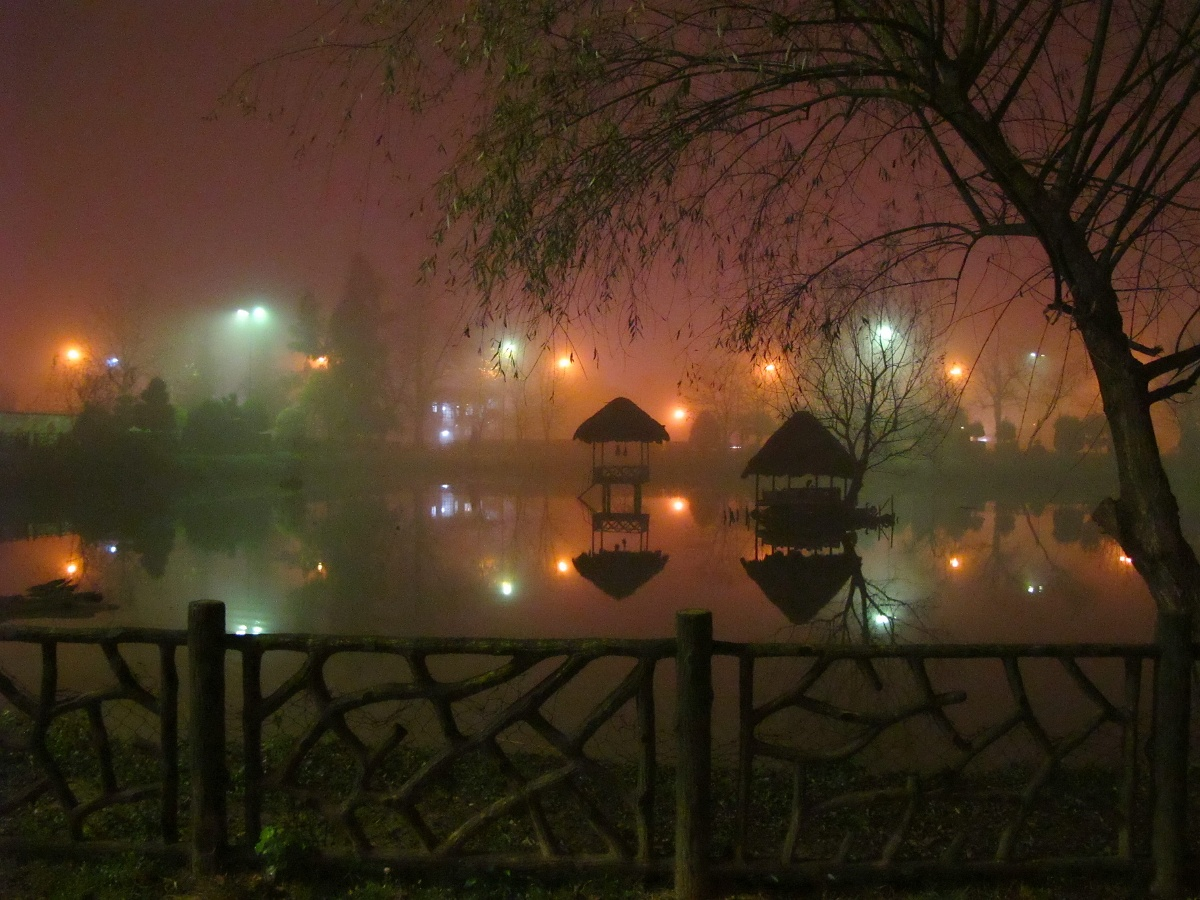
Mellat Park at Night

== Notable people ==
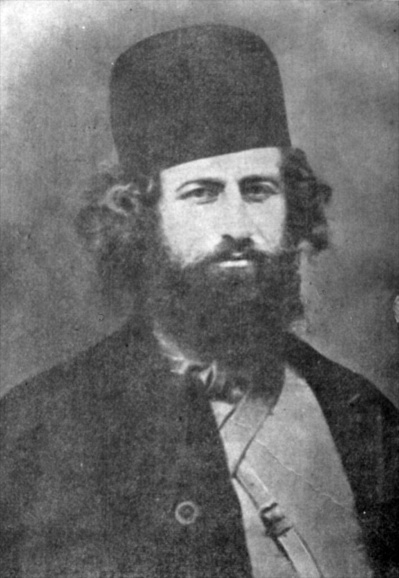
Mirza Kuchik Khan

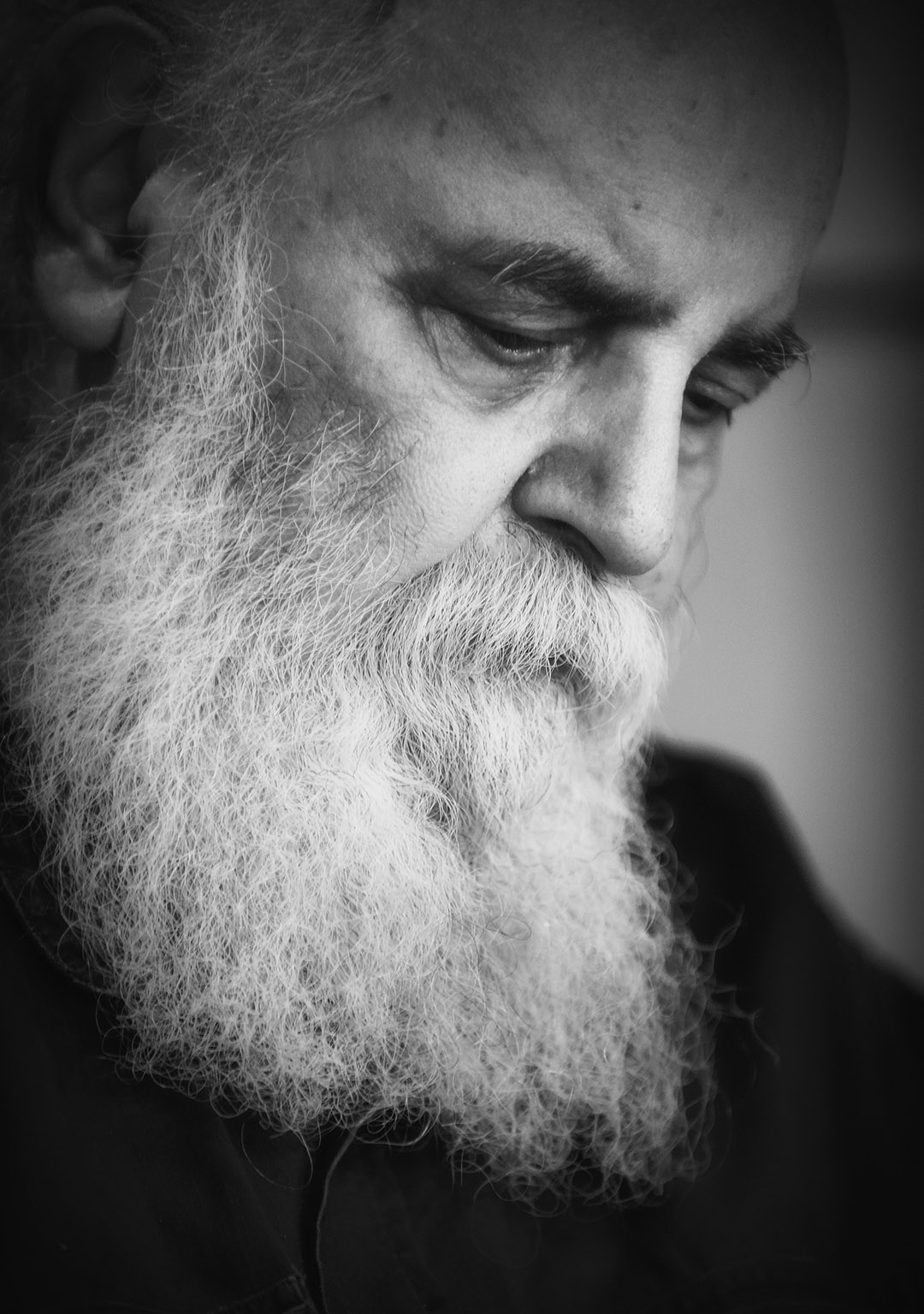
Hushang Ebtehaj

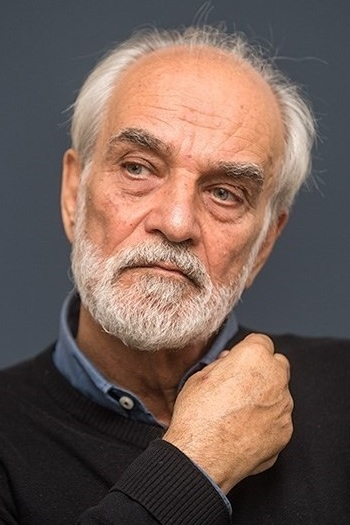
Aydin Aghdashloo

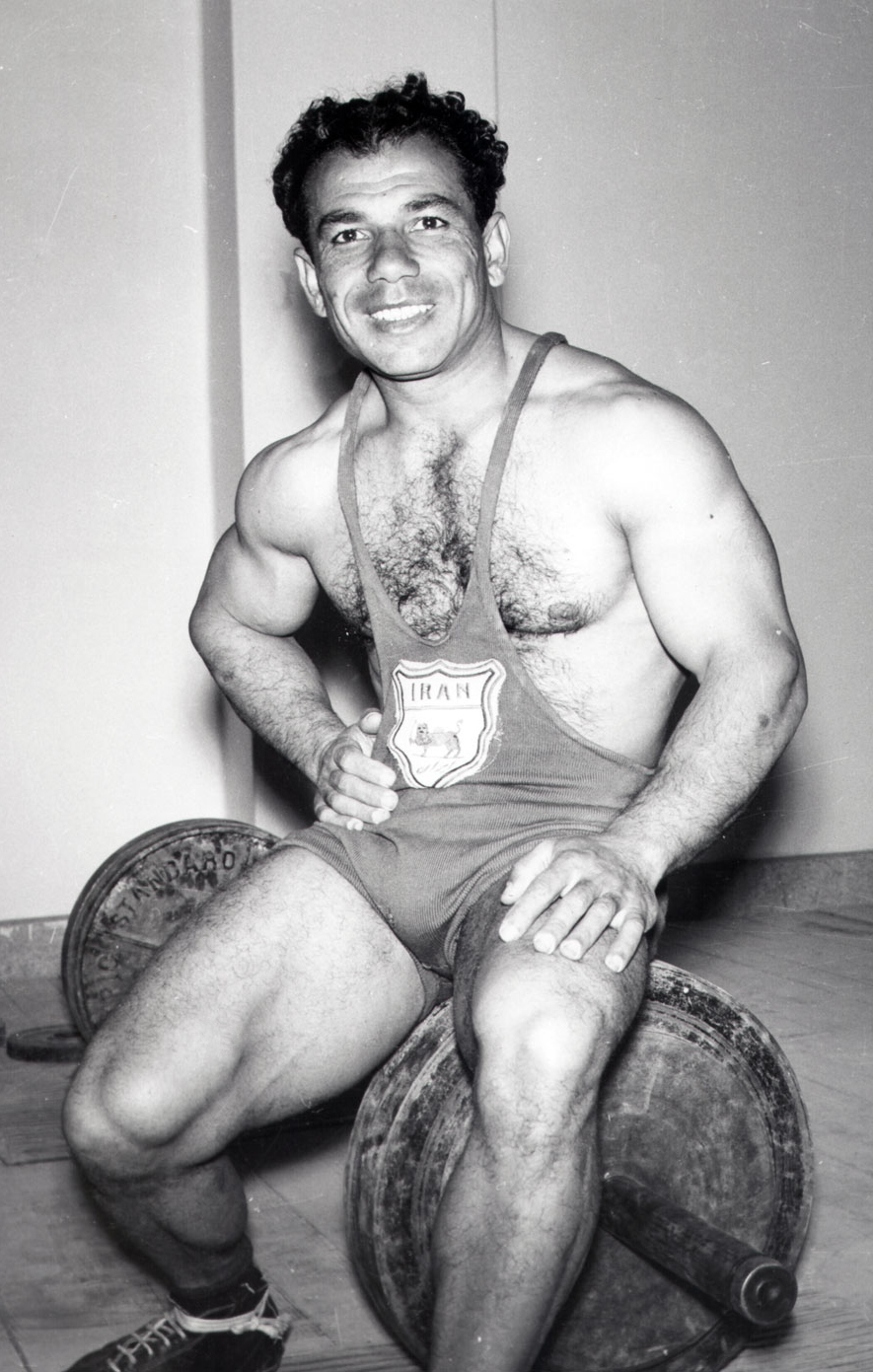
Mahmoud Namjoo

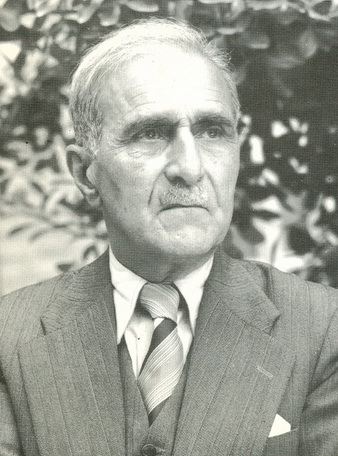
Ebrahim Pourdavoud

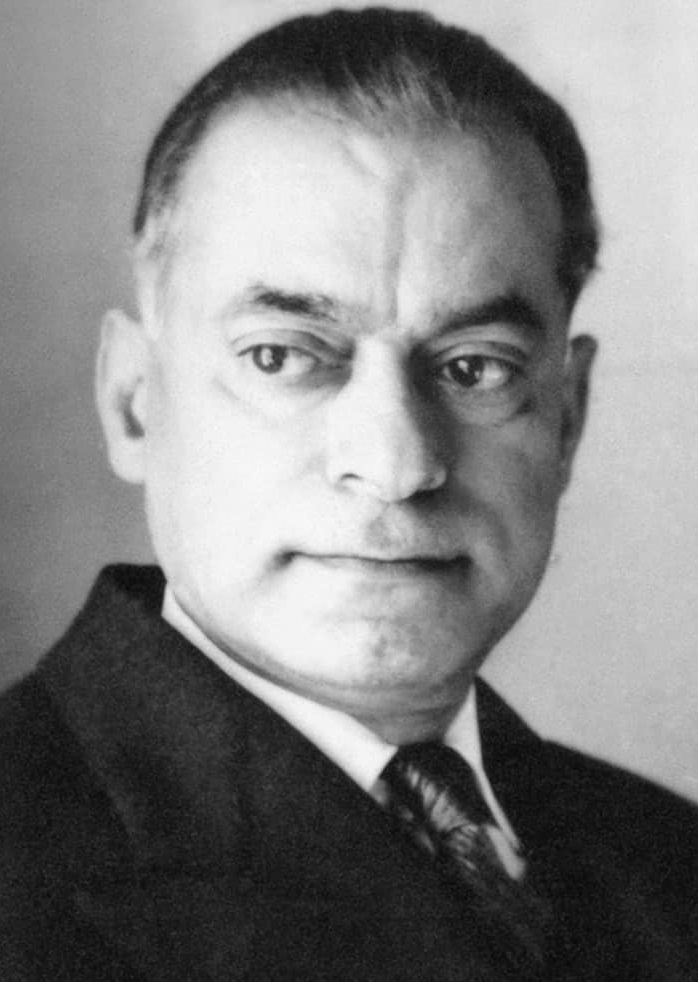
Mohammad Moin

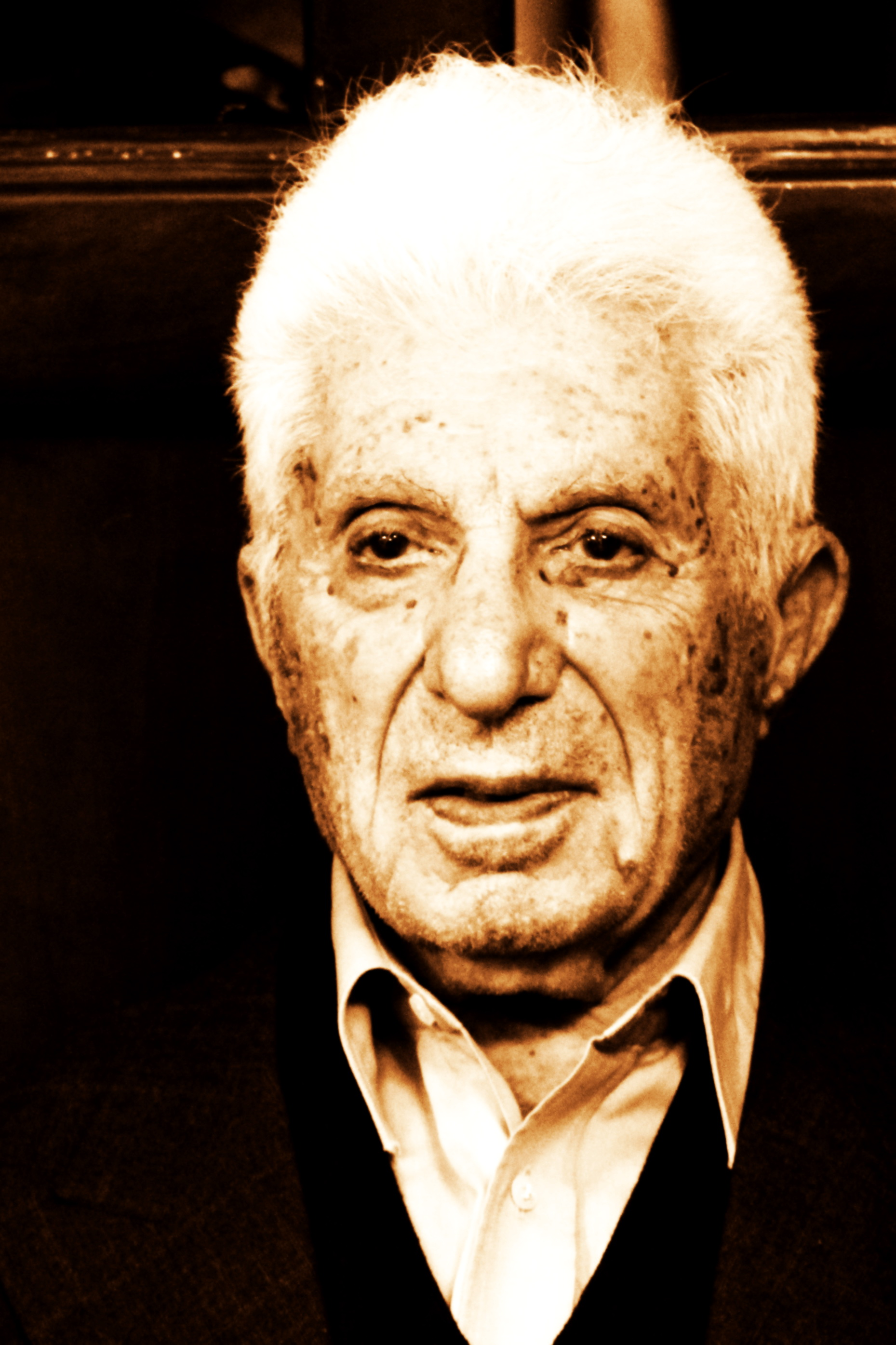
Fazlollah Reza

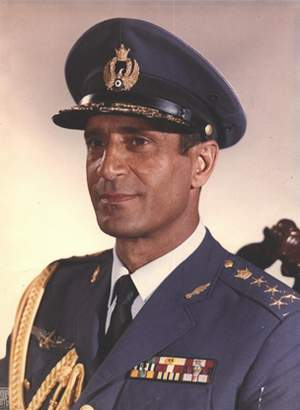
Mohammad Amir Khatami

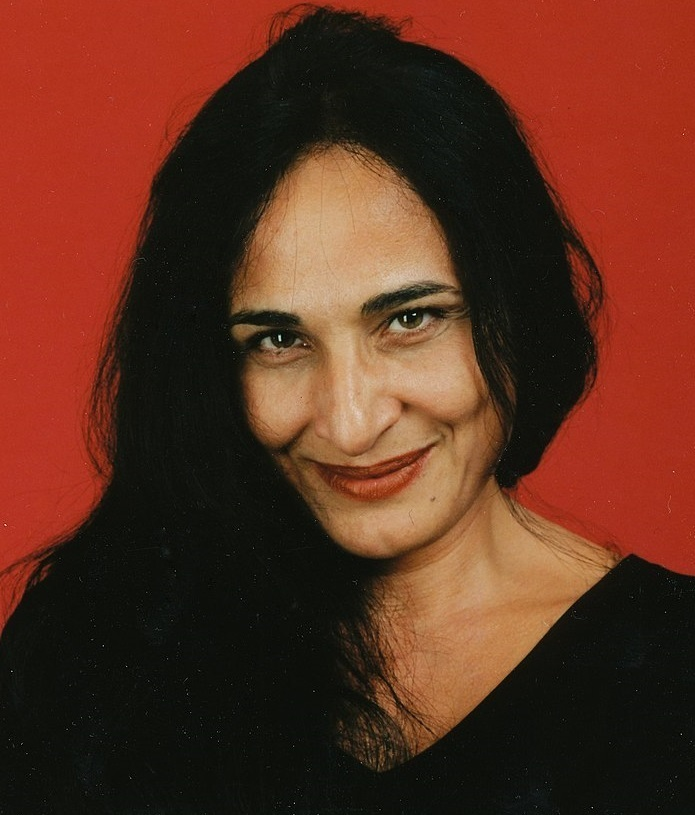
Susan Taslimi

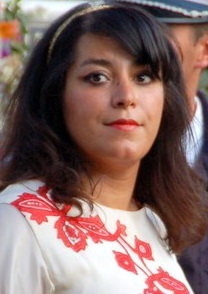
Marjane Satrapi

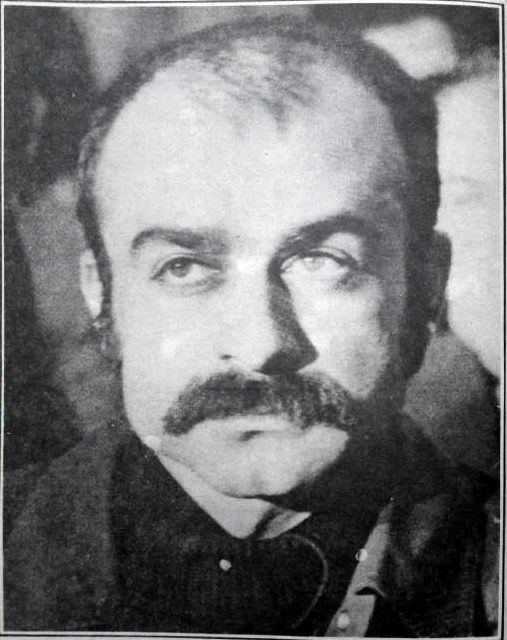
Khosrow Golsorkhi

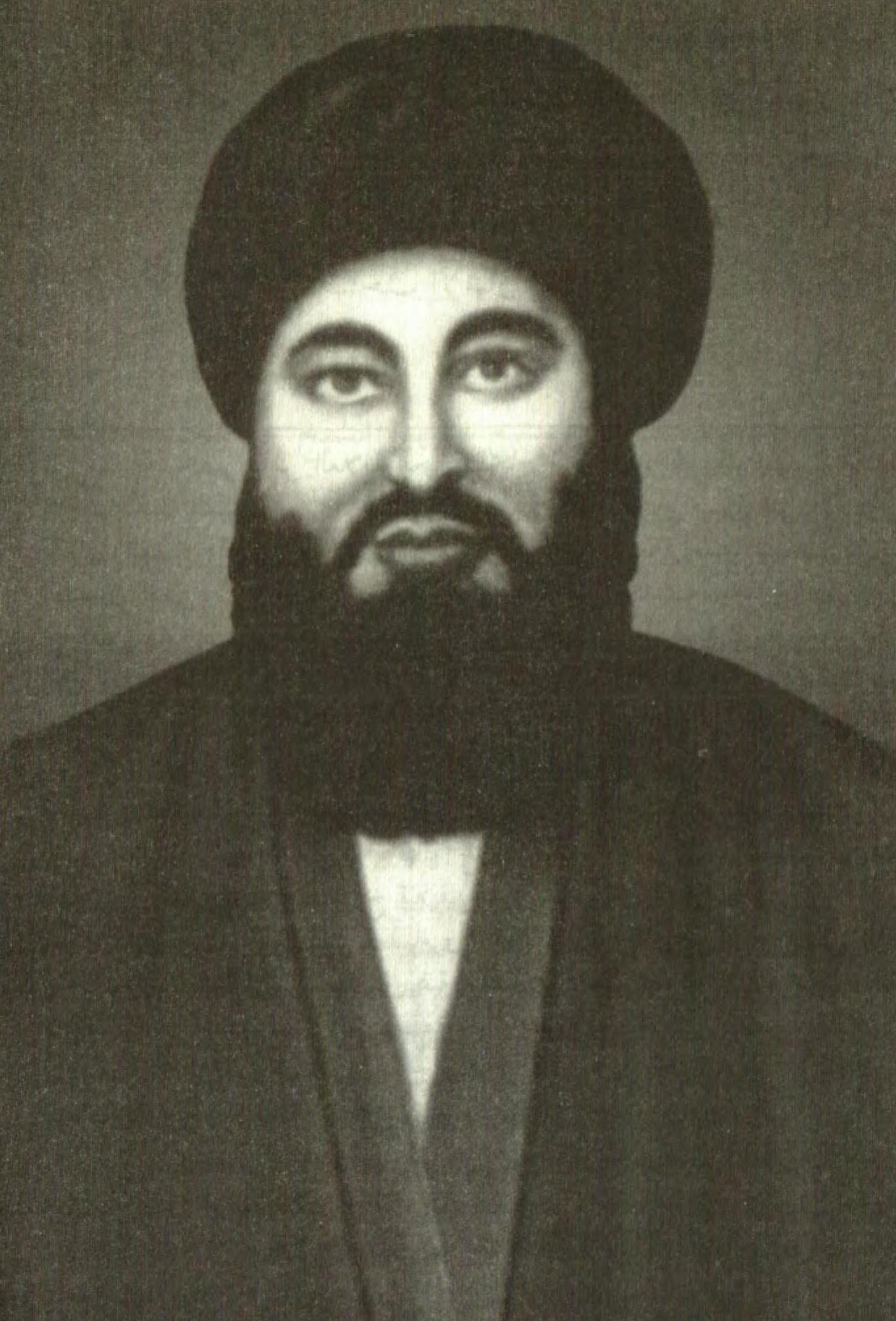
Kazim Rashti

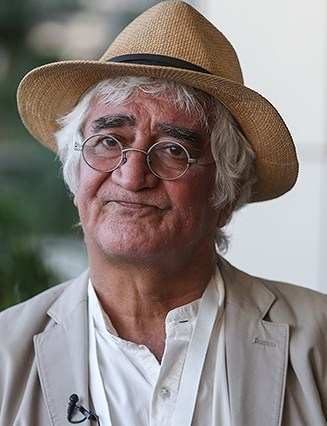
Kambuzia Partovi

- Azar Andami (1926–1984), physician and bacteriologist noted for her development of a cholera vaccine
- Aydin Aghdashloo (born 1940) painter, graphic artist, and art curator
- Fathollah Khan Akbar (1855–1937) Qajar dynasty prime minister
- Reza Baluchi (born 1972) cyclist, athlete
- Shohreh Bayat (born 1987) international chess arbiter for FIDE, awarded an International Women of Courage Award for being a champion for women’s rights, based in England
- Mahmoud Behzad (1913–2007) biologist
- Mir Abdolrez Daryabeigi (1930–2012) painter
- Hushang Ebtehaj (1928–2022) poet
- Mohsen Forouzan (1988) footballer
- Mohammad Bagher Nobakht (born 1950) politician and economist
- Asghar Ebrahimi (born 1982) weightlifter
- Amir Eftekhari (born 1964) footballer
- Esmaeil Elmkhah (1936–1988) weightlifter
- Mahmoud Etemadzadeh (1915–2006) writer
- Reza Ramezani Gilani (born 1963) Muslim cleric
- Shaya Goldoust (born 1986), Iranian-born Canadian journalist, activist
- Khosrow Golsorkhi (1944–1974) journalist, poet, and communist
- Saeid Hassanipour Karateka
- Hadi Jelveh (1919–2011) associate justice of the Iran Supreme Court
- Asghar Kardoust (1986) basketball player
- Alexander Kasimovich Kazembek (1802–1870) Azerbaijani-Russian Orientalist, historian, philologist
- Mirza Kuchik Khan (1880–1921) revolutionary leader
- Mohammad Khatam (1920 – 1975) Iranian air force commander and advisor to the Shah
- Hamideh Kheirabadi (1924–2010) actress
- Farideh Lashai (1944–2013), painter
- Arsen Minasian (1906–1977) Armenian founder of the first modern sanatorium in Iran
- Mohammad Moein (1914–1971) Linguistics and literature researcher
- Ardeshir Mohasses (1938–2008), illustrator, cartoonist
- Bahman Mohasses (1931–2010) painter, sculptor
- Nasrollah Moghtader Mojdehi (1921–2012 professor
- Youcef Nadarkhani (born 1977) Christian pastor sentenced to death for apostasy from Islam
- Habib Nafisi (1908–1984) engineer, educator
- Houchang Nahavandi (1932–2025) professor and politician
- Mahmoud Namjoo (1918–1989) weightlifter
- Amnon Netzer (1934–2008) Rasht-born Israeli historian, researcher, professor of Iranian history and culture as well as Persian and Judeo-Persian languages, and journalist.
- Mohammad Nouri (1929–2010), singer
- Ardeshir Ovanessian, (1905–1990) Communist leader
- Ebrahim Poordavood (1885–1968) academic
- Kazim Rashti, Shaykhi scholar
- Mohammad Rahbari (born 1991) fencer
- Yahya Rahmat-Samii (born 1948), electrical engineer, professor at UCLA
- Dariush Ramezani (born 1976) cartoonist
- Enayatollah Reza (1920–2010) historian
- Fazlollah Reza (1915–2019) Former Iran's ambassador to UNICEF and former manager of Sharif University
- Anoushiravan Rohani (born 1939) Musician
- Massoumeh Seyhoun (1934–2010) painter
- Sadeq Saba Head of BBC Persian Service
- Majid Samiei (born 1937) Neurosurgeon and the Manager of Hanover Brain and Nerves Treatment institute
- Hossein Sami'i (1876–1953) writer, poet, diplomat, and politician
- Marjane Satrapi (1969–2026) graphic novelist, cartoonist, film director
- Houman Seyyedi (born 1980) actor and director
- Zahra Tabari (born 1958), human rights actiist
- Hadi Tabatabaei (born 1973) footballer
- Susan Taslimi (born 1950) actress
- Mohammad Tolouei (born 1979) writer
- Homayoon Toufighi (born 1990) chess grandmaster
- Babak Zarrin (born 1978) composer

== Distance to major cities ==
City	Km distance
Isfahan	640
Tehran	326
Kerman	1250
Mashhad	1063
Tonekabon	137
Amol	295
Shahrekord	739
Ahvaz	956

== Twin towns – sister cities ==
Rasht is twinned with:

- Astrakhan, Russia
- Moscow, Russia
- Multan, Pakistan
- Trabzon, Turkey
