= Anushirvan =

Anushirvan (Middle Persian: Anōšagruwān, Persian: انوشيروان, Anūšīrvān) or Nushirvan may refer to:

== People ==
- Khosrow I (501–579), known as Anushirvan, Sasanian king
- Anushirvan Sharaf al-Ma'ali (1030–1050), Ziyarid king
- Anushirvan ibn Lashkari, Shaddadid ruler (1049)
- Anushirwan, Ilkhan khanate (died 1356)
- Husain Shah Chak (1563–1570), Chak Sultan, was popularly known as Nushirvan of Kashmir
- Darashaw Nosherwan Wadia (1883–1969), Indian geologist
- Jamsetji Nusserwanji Tata (1839–1904), Indian industrialist, founder of the Tata Group and Jamshedpur
- Dara Nusserwanji Khurody (1906–1983), Indian dairy entrepreneur
- Noshirvan Nagarwala (1909–1998), Indian cricket umpire
- Rustomjee Naserwanjee Khory (1839–1904), Indian physician and writer
- Yazdi Naoshriwan Karanjia (born 1937), Indian theatre personality
- Raja Nushirwan (born 1973), Malaysian diplomat and civil servant

== Places in Iran ==
- Anushirvan, Iran, a village in North Khorasan Province, Iran
- Anushirvan, Kermanshah, a village in Kermanshah Province, Iran
- Anushirvan, Sistan and Baluchestan, a village in Sistan and Baluchestan Province, Iran

== See also ==
- Nausherwan-E-Adil, 1957 Indian film
- Nosherwan (disambiguation)
- Nosher (disambiguation)
- Nowshar (disambiguation)
- Anushawan
