= Nosherwan =

Nosherwan may refer to:

- Khosrow I (501–579), known as Nosherwan, Sasanian king
- Nosherwan Khan (born 1994), Pakistani squash player
- Noshirvan Nagarwala (1909–1998), Indian cricket umpire
- Dara Nusserwanji Khurody (1906–1983), Indian dairy entrepreneur
- Darashaw Nosherwan Wadia (1883-1969), Indian geologist
- Jamsetji Nusserwanji Tata (1839–1904), Indian industrialist, founder of the Tata Group and Jamshedpur
- Rustomjee Naserwanjee Khory (1839–1904), Indian physician and writer
- Yazdi Naoshriwan Karanjia (born 1937), Indian theatre personality

== See also ==
- Nausherwan-E-Adil, 1957 Indian film
- Nosher (disambiguation)
- Nowshar (disambiguation)
- Anushirvan (disambiguation)
