= Nowshahr (disambiguation) =

Nowshahr or Now Shahr may refer to the following places in Iran:

- Nowshahr, Mazandaran Province, Iran
  - Nowshahr County
- Now Shahr, Ardabil
- Nowshahr, East Azerbaijan
- Nowshahr-e Kalangi, Hormozgan
- Nowshahr-e Surgi, Hormozgan

== See also ==
- Nowshar (disambiguation)
- Nowshera (disambiguation)
