= Vio =

Vio or VIO may refer to:

== Vio ==
- Vio (American drink), a flavoured milk and carbonated water beverage produced by the Coca-Cola Company
  - Vio (Indian drink), a later version of the above beverage, produced by the Coca-Cola Company in India
- Vio (surname)
- Vio, a 3D photorealistic rendering package for Caddie
- vio, the alias of the leader of dissolved Hacktivist/Cyberterrorist group SiegedSec

== VIO ==
- Venezuela Information Office, a lobbying agency based in the U.S.
- Viohalco, a Greek heavy industry corporation with stock symbol VIO
- Vehicles In Operation
- Virtual I/O (VIO), a facility of IBM's MVS.

== See also ==
- VIOS (disambiguation)
