= Baleskeleh-ye Seyyed Abu ol Qasem =

Baleskeleh-ye Seyyed Abu ol Qasem بلسكله سيدابوالقاسم
- Village
- Location within Iran
- Coordinates: 37°22′54″N 49°46′14″E
- Country: Iran
- Province: Gilan
- County: Rasht
- Bakhsh: Khoshk-e Bijar
- Rural District: Nowsher-e Koshk-e Bijar

Population (2016)
  - Total: 234
- Time zone: UTC+3:30 (IRST)

Baleskeleh-ye Seyyed Abu ol Qasem (Persian: بلسكله سيدابوالقاسم, also Romanized as Baleskeleh-ye Seyyed Ābū ol Qāsem; also known as Balaskaleh and Baleskeleh) is a village in Nowsher-e Koshk-e Bijar Rural District, Khoshk-e Bijar District, Rasht County, Gilan Province, Iran. At the 2016 census, its population was 234, in 87 families. Increased from 110 people in 2006.
