= Rud Posht, Rasht =

Village in Gilan province, Iran

Rud Posht Persian: رودپشت
- Village
- Location within Iran
- Coordinates: 37°22′43″N 49°48′29″E
- Country: Iran
- Province: Gilan
- County: Rasht
- District: Khoshk-e Bijar
- Rural District: Nowsher-e Khoshk-e Bijar

Population (2016)
  - Total: 728
- Time zone: UTC+3:30 (IRST)

Rud Posht (Persian: رودپشت) (Note: Also romanized as Rūd Posht) is a village in Nowsher-e Khoshk-e Bijar Rural District of Khoshk-e Bijar District in Rasht County, Gilan province, Iran.

== Demographics ==
=== Population ===
At the time of the 2006 National Census, the village's population was 822 in 245 households. The following census in 2011 counted 767 people in 252 households. The 2016 census measured the population of the village as 728 people in 259 households.
