= Nosh =

Nosh may refer to:

- NOSH-aspirin, a category of new hybrids of aspirin
- Farah Nosh, Iraqi-Canadian photojournalist
- Nosh A Lody (born 1989), Finnish footballer of Congolese descent
- The Nosh Bar, London salt beef bar

== See also ==
- Nosher (disambiguation)
