= Balaskaleh-ye Emam Jomeh =

Village in Gilan province, Iran

Balaskaleh-ye Emam Jomeh Persian: بلسكله امام جمعه
- Village
- Location within Iran
- Country: Iran
- Province: Gilan
- County: Rasht
- District: Khoshk-e Bijar
- Rural District: Hajji Bekandeh-ye Khoshk-e Bijar

Population (2016)
  - Total: 288
- Time zone: UTC+3:30 (IRST)

Balaskaleh-ye Emam Jomeh (Persian: بلسكله امام جمعه) (Note: Also romanized as Balaskaleh-ye Emām Jom‘eh; also known as Balaskaleh-ye Emām Jom‘eh-ye Bozorg) is a village in Hajji Bekandeh-ye Khoshk-e Bijar Rural District of Khoshk-e Bijar District in Rasht County, Gilan province, Iran.

== Demographics ==
=== Population ===
At the time of the 2006 National Census, the village's population was 311 in 94 households. The following census in 2011 counted 305 people in 109 households. The 2016 census measured the population of the village as 288 people in 109 households.
