= Tamal, Gilan =

Village in Gilan province, Iran

Tamal Persian: تمل
- Village
- Location within Iran
- Coordinates: 37°24′15″N 49°44′07″E
- Country: Iran
- Province: Gilan
- County: Rasht
- District: Khoshk-e Bijar
- Rural District: Nowsher-e Khoshk-e Bijar

Population (2016)
  - Total: 1,508
- Time zone: UTC+3:30 (IRST)

Tamal (Persian: تمل) (Note: Also known as Tamal-e Bālā Maḩalleh) is a village in Nowsher-e Khoshk-e Bijar Rural District of Khoshk-e Bijar District in Rasht County, Gilan province, Iran.

== Demographics ==
=== Population ===
At the time of the 2006 National Census, the village's population was 1,720 in 456 households. The following census in 2011 counted 1,698 people in 551 households. The 2016 census measured the population of the village as 1,508 people in 508 households. It was the most populous village in its rural district.
