= Yusef Mahalleh =

Yusef Mahalleh يوسف محله
- Village
- Location within Iran
- Coordinates: 37°23′28″N 49°46′35″E
- Country: Iran
- Province: Gilan
- County: Rasht
- Bakhsh: Khoshk-e Bijar
- Rural District: Nowsher-e Koshk-e Bijar

Population (2006)
  - Total: 123
- Time zone: UTC+3:30 (IRST)

Yusef Mahalleh (Persian: يوسف محله, also Romanized as Yūsef Maḩalleh, formerly known as Yusef Mahalleh-ye Khoshkebijar) is a village in Nowsher-e Koshk-e Bijar Rural District, Khoshk-e Bijar District, Rasht County, Gilan Province, Iran. At the 2016 census, its population was 69, in 25 families. Decreased from 123 people in 2006.

Yusef Mahalleh Population history
Year	Pop.	±%
1956	391	—
1966	524	+34.0%
1976	278	−46.9%
1986	131	−52.9%
2006	123	−6.1%
2016	69	−43.9%
