= Shahrestan, Khoshk-e Bijar =

Village in Gilan province, Iran

Shahrestan Persian: شهرستان
- Village
- Location within Iran
- Coordinates: 37°25′05″N 49°48′50″E
- Country: Iran
- Province: Gilan
- County: Rasht
- District: Khoshk-e Bijar
- Rural District: Hajji Bekandeh-ye Khoshk-e Bijar

Population (2016)
  - Total: 873
- Time zone: UTC+3:30 (IRST)

Shahrestan (Persian: شهرستان) (Note: Also romanized as Shahrestān; also known as Khoshk-e Bījār, Shagrestan, Shahrestān-e Khoshgh Bijar, and Shahrestān-e Kohdam) is a village in Hajji Bekandeh-ye Khoshk-e Bijar Rural District of Khoshk-e Bijar District in Rasht County, Gilan province, Iran.

== Demographics ==
=== Population ===
At the time of the 2006 National Census, the village's population was 874 in 279 households. The following census in 2011 counted 856 people in 298 households. The 2016 census measured the population of the village as 873 people in 331 households.
