= Amir Bekandeh =

Village in Gilan province, Iran

Amir Bekandeh Persian: اميربكنده
- Village
- Location within Iran
- Coordinates: 37°26′48″N 49°44′53″E
- Country: Iran
- Province: Gilan
- County: Rasht
- District: Khoshk-e Bijar
- Rural District: Hajji Bekandeh-ye Khoshk-e Bijar

Population (2016)
  - Total: 318
- Time zone: UTC+3:30 (IRST)

Amir Bekandeh (Persian: اميربكنده) (Note: Also romanized as Amīr Bekandeh; also known as Amīr Kandeh, Amir-Kende, and Amit Kendeh) is a village in Hajji Bekandeh-ye Khoshk-e Bijar Rural District of Khoshk-e Bijar District in Rasht County, Gilan province, Iran.

== Demographics ==
=== Population ===
At the time of the 2006 National Census, the village's population was 384 in 114 households. The following census in 2011 counted 316 people in 104 households. The 2016 census measured the population of the village as 318 people in 109 households.
