= Yusefabad, Rasht =

Yusefabad يوسف اباد
- Village
- Location within Iran
- Coordinates: 37°21′46″N 49°44′34″E
- Country: Iran
- Province: Gilan
- County: Rasht
- Bakhsh: Khoshk-e Bijar
- Rural District: Nowsher-e Koshk-e Bijar

Population (2006)
  - Total: 326
- Time zone: UTC+3:30 (IRST)

Yusefabad (Persian: يوسف اباد, also Romanized as Yūsefābād, Yūsofābād, and Yoosof Abad; also known as Vīskeh Āqā Yūsof and Yusufabad) is a village in Nowsher-e Koshk-e Bijar Rural District, Khoshk-e Bijar District, Rasht County, Gilan Province, Iran. At the 2016 census, its population was 160, in 54 families. Decreased from 326 people in 2006.
