= Tazehabad, Khoshk-e Bijar =

Village in Gilan province, Iran

Tazehabad Persian: تازه اباد
- Village
- Location within Iran
- Coordinates: 37°23′28″N 49°46′37″E
- Country: Iran
- Province: Gilan
- County: Rasht
- District: Khoshk-e Bijar
- Rural District: Hajji Bekandeh-ye Khoshk-e Bijar

Population (2016)
  - Total: 290
- Time zone: UTC+3:30 (IRST)

Tazehabad (Persian: تازه اباد) (Note: Also romanized as Tāzehābād; also known as Tazeabad and Tāzehābād-e Khoshkbījār) is a village in Hajji Bekandeh-ye Khoshk-e Bijar Rural District of Khoshk-e Bijar District in Rasht County, Gilan province, Iran.

== Demographics ==
=== Population ===
At the time of the 2006 National Census, the village's population was 293 in 92 households. The following census in 2011 counted 266 people in 94 households. The 2016 census measured the population of the village as 290 people in 111 households.
