= Rofuh Chah =

Rofuh Chah رفوه چاه
- Village
- Location within Iran
- Coordinates: 37°21′04″N 49°45′04″E
- Country: Iran
- Province: Gilan
- County: Rasht
- Bakhsh: Khoshk-e Bijar
- Rural District: Nowsher-e Koshk-e Bijar

Population (2016)
  - Total: 422
- Time zone: UTC+3:30 (IRST)

Rofuh Chah (Persian: رفوه چاه, also Romanized as Rofūh Chāh; also known as Rafū Chāh, Rofū Chāh, Roof Chah, Rūbāchāh, Rubachakh, Rūfchā, and Rūfchāh) is a village in Nowsher-e Koshk-e Bijar Rural District, Khoshk-e Bijar District, Rasht County, Gilan Province, Iran. At the 2016 census, its population was 422 in 136 families. Up from 390 in 2006.
