= Jirkuyeh =

Village in Gilan province, Iran

Jirkuyeh Persian: جيركويه
- Village
- Location within Iran
- Coordinates: 37°23′59″N 49°47′06″E
- Country: Iran
- Province: Gilan
- County: Rasht
- District: Khoshk-e Bijar
- Rural District: Hajji Bekandeh-ye Khoshk-e Bijar

Population (2016)
  - Total: 1,103
- Time zone: UTC+3:30 (IRST)

Jirkuyeh (Persian: جيركويه) (Note: Also romanized as Jir Kooyeh and Jīrkūyeh; also known as Dzhirkukh, Jīrkūyeh-ye Khoshkbījār, and Jūrkūyeh) is a village in Hajji Bekandeh-ye Khoshk-e Bijar Rural District of Khoshk-e Bijar District in Rasht County, Gilan province, Iran.

== Demographics ==
=== Population ===
At the time of the 2006 National Census, the village's population was 1,215 in 359 households. The following census in 2011 counted 1,582 people in 514 households. The 2016 census measured the population of the village as 1,103 people in 387 households. It was the most populous village in its rural district.
