= Hajji Bekandeh =

Village in Gilan province, Iran

Hajji Bekandeh Persian: حاجی‌بکنده
- Village
- Location within Iran
- Coordinates: 37°26′43″N 49°47′23″E
- Country: Iran
- Province: Gilan
- County: Rasht
- District: Khoshk-e Bijar
- Rural District: Hajji Bekandeh-ye Khoshk-e Bijar

Population (2016)
  - Total: 711
- Time zone: UTC+3:30 (IRST)

Hajji Bekandeh (Persian: حاجی‌بکنده) (Note: Also romanized as Ḩājjī Bekandeh; also known as Ḩājjī Bekandī) is a village in, and the capital of, Hajji Bekandeh-ye Khoshk-e Bijar Rural District in Khoshk-e Bijar District of Rasht County, Gilan province, Iran.

== Demographics ==
=== Population ===
At the time of the 2006 National Census, the village's population was 838 in 249 households. The following census in 2011 counted 837 people in 269 households. The 2016 census measured the population of the village as 711 people in 268 households.
