= Aminabad, Rasht =

Village in Gilan province, Iran

Aminabad Persian: امین‌آباد
- Village
- Location within Iran
- Coordinates: 37°26′36″N 49°48′28″E
- Country: Iran
- Province: Gilan
- County: Rasht
- District: Khoshk-e Bijar
- Rural District: Hajji Bekandeh-ye Khoshk-e Bijar

Population (2016)
  - Total: 603
- Time zone: UTC+3:30 (IRST)

Aminabad (Persian: امین‌آباد) (Note: Also romanized as Amīnābād) is a village in Hajji Bekandeh-ye Khoshk-e Bijar Rural District of Khoshk-e Bijar District in Rasht County, Gilan province, Iran.

== Demographics ==
=== Population ===
At the time of the 2006 National Census, the village's population was 681 in 195 households. The following census in 2011 counted 679 people in 216 households. The 2016 census measured the population of the village as 603 people in 221 households.
