= Chukadeh =

Village in Gilan province, Iran

Chukadeh Persian: چوكده
- Village
- Location within Iran
- Coordinates: 37°25′32″N 49°45′37″E
- Country: Iran
- Province: Gilan
- County: Rasht
- District: Khoshk-e Bijar
- Rural District: Hajji Bekandeh-ye Khoshk-e Bijar

Population (2016)
  - Total: 258
- Time zone: UTC+3:30 (IRST)

Chukadeh (Persian: چوكده) (Note: Also romanized as Chūkadeh; also known as Chūgdeh and Chūgūdeh) is a village in Hajji Bekandeh-ye Khoshk-e Bijar Rural District of Khoshk-e Bijar District in Rasht County, Gilan province, Iran.

== Demographics ==
=== Population ===
At the time of the 2006 National Census, the village's population was 317 in 98 households. The following census in 2011 counted 287 people in 101 households. The 2016 census measured the population of the village as 258 people in 97 households.
