= Jayakrishna Indraji =

Indian botanist

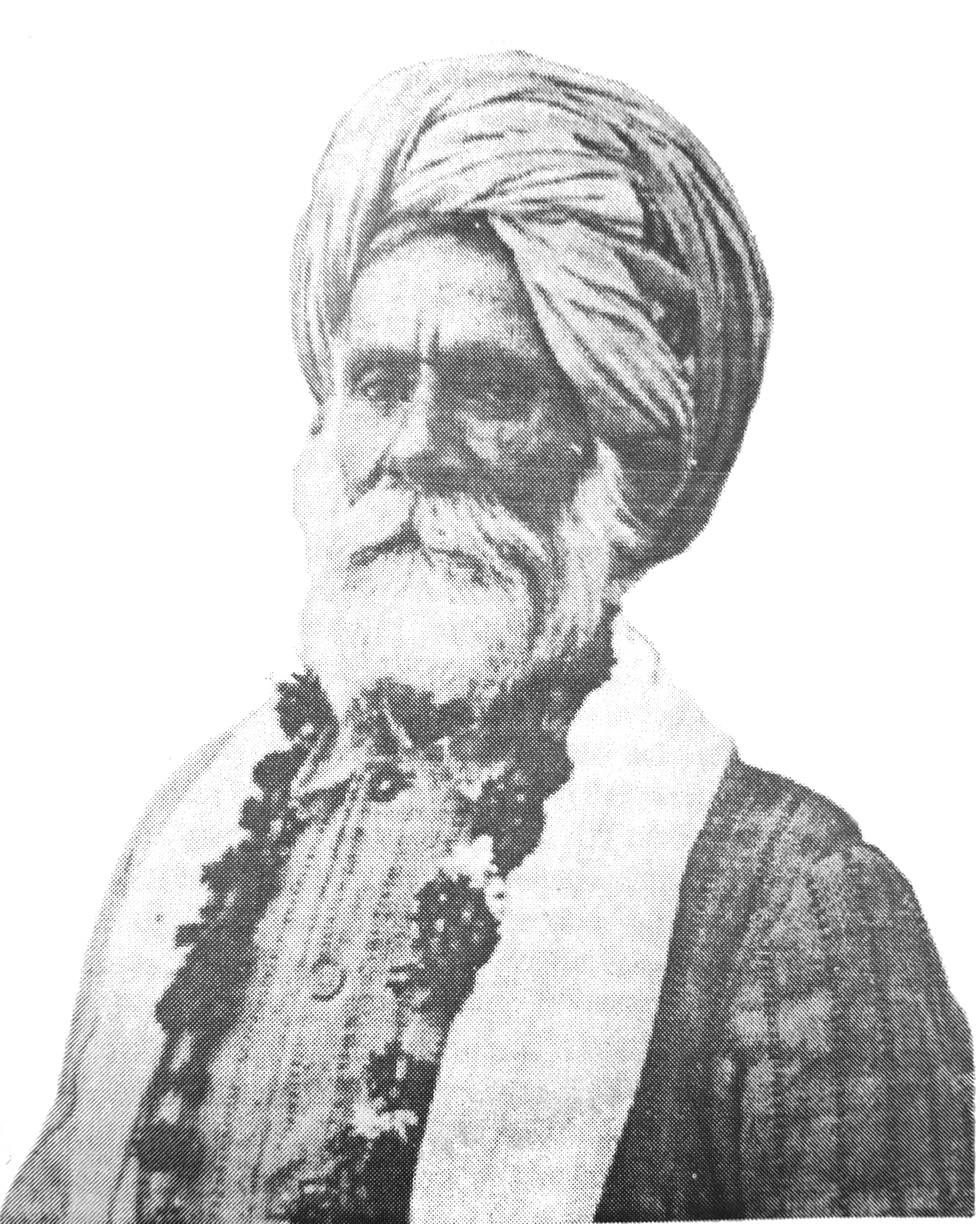
The only known portrait of Jayakrishna Indraji reprinted from Bapalal's 1931 biography in Shah's 1999 translation into English.

Jayakrishna Indraji (sometimes spelled Jaikrishna or referred to as Jayakrishna Indraji Thaker) (1 October 1849 – 3 December 1929) was an Indian botanist and ethnobotanist from the Princely state of Porbander who wrote the first botanical treatise following Hooker's classification in an Indian regional language (Gujarati) - Vanaspati Shastra (1910). He also wrote and illustrated the book Plants of Cutch and their utility (1926) and contributed to the works of Rustomjee Khory where he is not acknowledged and to the works of K.R. Kirtikar, an army doctor and botanist in Bombay. He was employed by the King of Porbander State in Kutch as a Curator of Forests and Gardens from 1886 during which time he was involved in the introduction and planting of many species of plants of economic and medicinal value.

== Early life and work ==
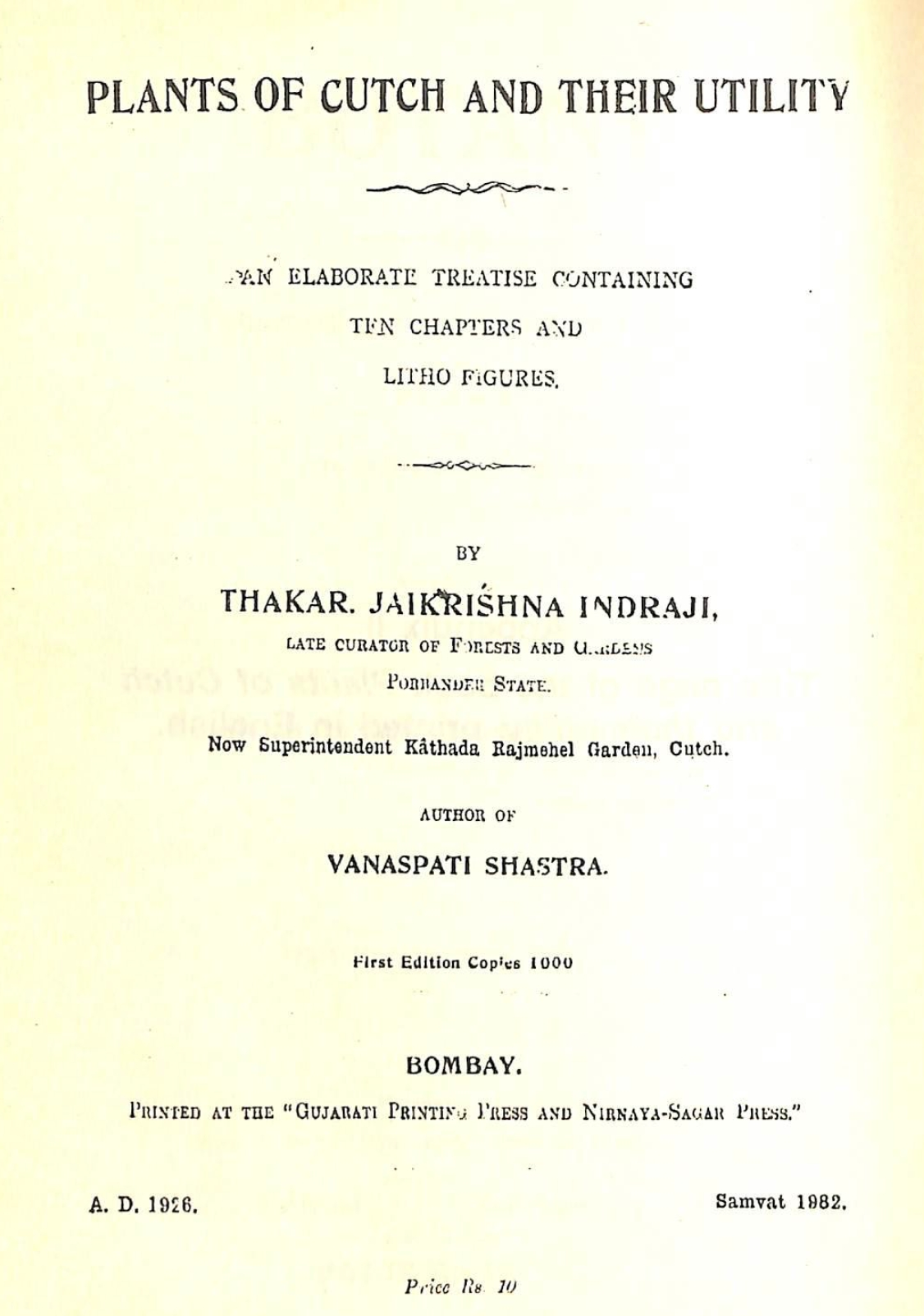
Title page of Plants of Cutch and their utility (1926)

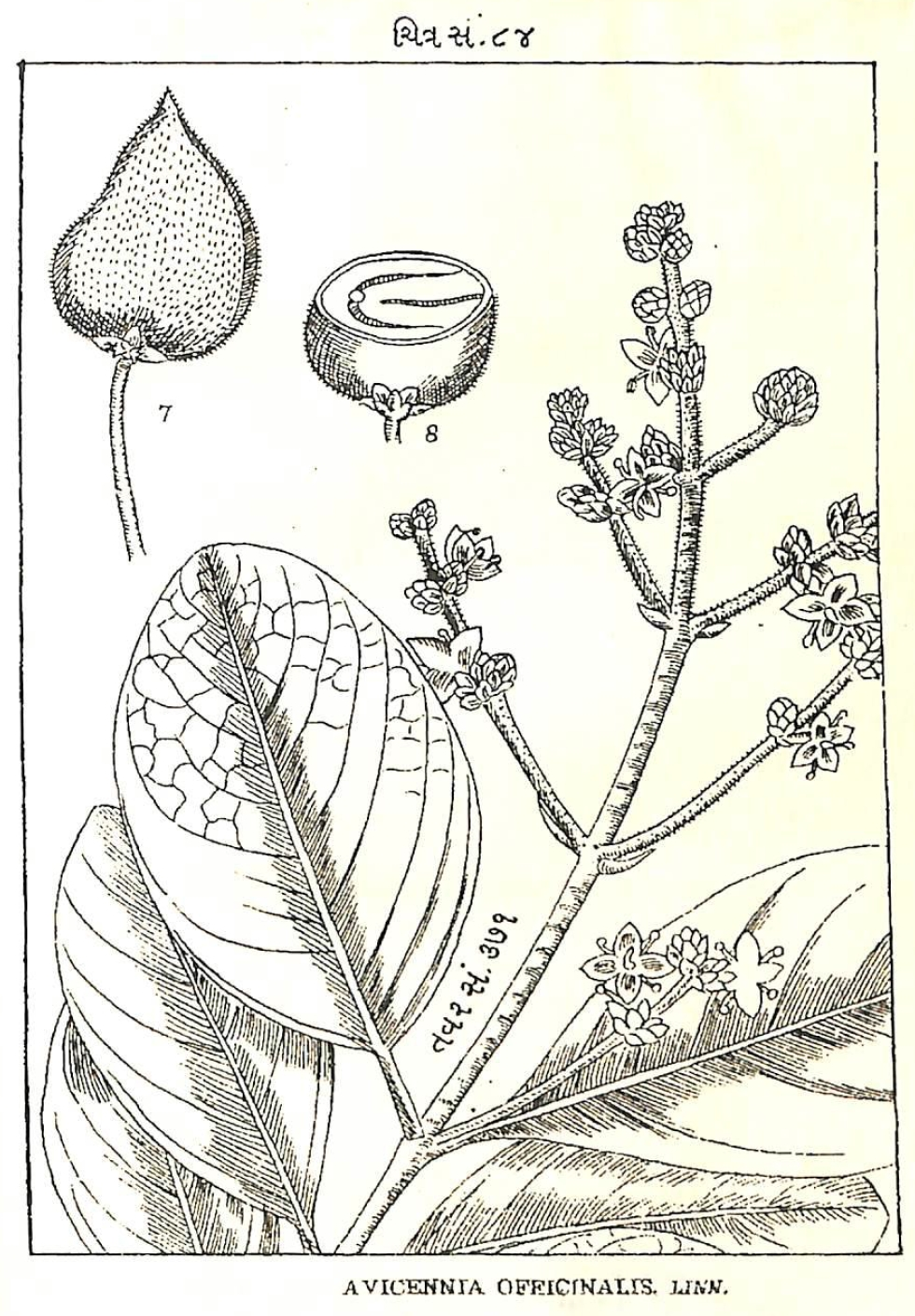
Illustration of Avicennia marina (then called Avicennia officinalis) by Indraji from his 1926 Plants of Cutch and their utility.

Jayakrishna Indraji was born on Vijayadasami day (Samvat 1905) 1849 in Lakhpat village, Kutch. He came from a Girnara Brahmin family of temple priests, his father Indraji Thaker was the "keeper of keys for the village". Indraji worked for a while at Dholka before moving to Lakhpat. Jayakrisha was the fourth of five sons and two daughters. Following the death of his father, he lived with an older brother and worked for some time as a helper cook for a priestess at a temple in Sindh (now in Pakistan). He initially received informal schooling from a local tutor, Mavji Pandeya and took an interest in physical training such as gymnastics, studying under Natha Siddi, a noted acrobat who belonged to the Siddi community of African settlers in Kutch. Jayakrishna was very well built and strong armed, able to walk on his hands. He however had poor hearing. He studied English at Baharamji Parsi School and studied at the Gokaldas Tejpal School and the Robert Mani School for his third and fourth class moving schools due to high fees.

=== Bombay ===
At 14 he moved to Bombay to stay with another brother to study at high school but he could not pay the monthly fee of a rupee and abandoned studies. He briefly moved to Mathura when his brother went there on a pilgrimage. At Mathura his brother helped Indraji establish a book shop. For a while, he sold Hindi and Sanskrit books obtained for him by Pandit Jayashtharam Mukundji of Bombay. Ill health forced his return to Bombay where he received treatment from Bhagwan Lal Indraji a specialist in Ayurveda. While being treated he noticed some old manuscripts that Bhagwan Lal was studying as an archaeologist and he became very interested in the field and expressed his wish to learn more.

When Bhagwan Lal accompanied James Burgess to Nasik for some studies of inscriptions, Jayakrisha accompanied them. This association which lasted for nearly a decade extended from an interest in archaeology to herbal medicines, and plants. He began to study Hooker's First Book of Botany and learned to prepare herbarium specimens. Bhagwan Lal then suggested that Indraji meet Dr Sakharam Arjun, botany professor at Grant Medical College. He began to identify plants and learn botany from Sakharam Arjun and preparing herbarium specimens of plants from around Bombay. He gradually became acquainted with many other naturalists including Herbert Mills Birdwood, Chester MacNaghten, Principal of the Rajkumar College at Rajkot, James Macnabb Campbell and Dr D. MacDonald who succeeded Sakharam Arjun at the Grant Medical College. After the death of Arjun, Indraji was in contact with his adopted daughter Rukhmabai who introduced Indraji to the botanist Dr J.C. Lisboa. When MacNaghten went on holidays he sought the ethno-botanical assistance of Indraji and along with Dr MacDonald, they made visits to Matheran to study the flora. Rustomjee Khory made use of Indraji's assistance paying Rupees 30 a month while producing his Materia Medica but did not acknowledge his help.

== Employment in Porbander ==
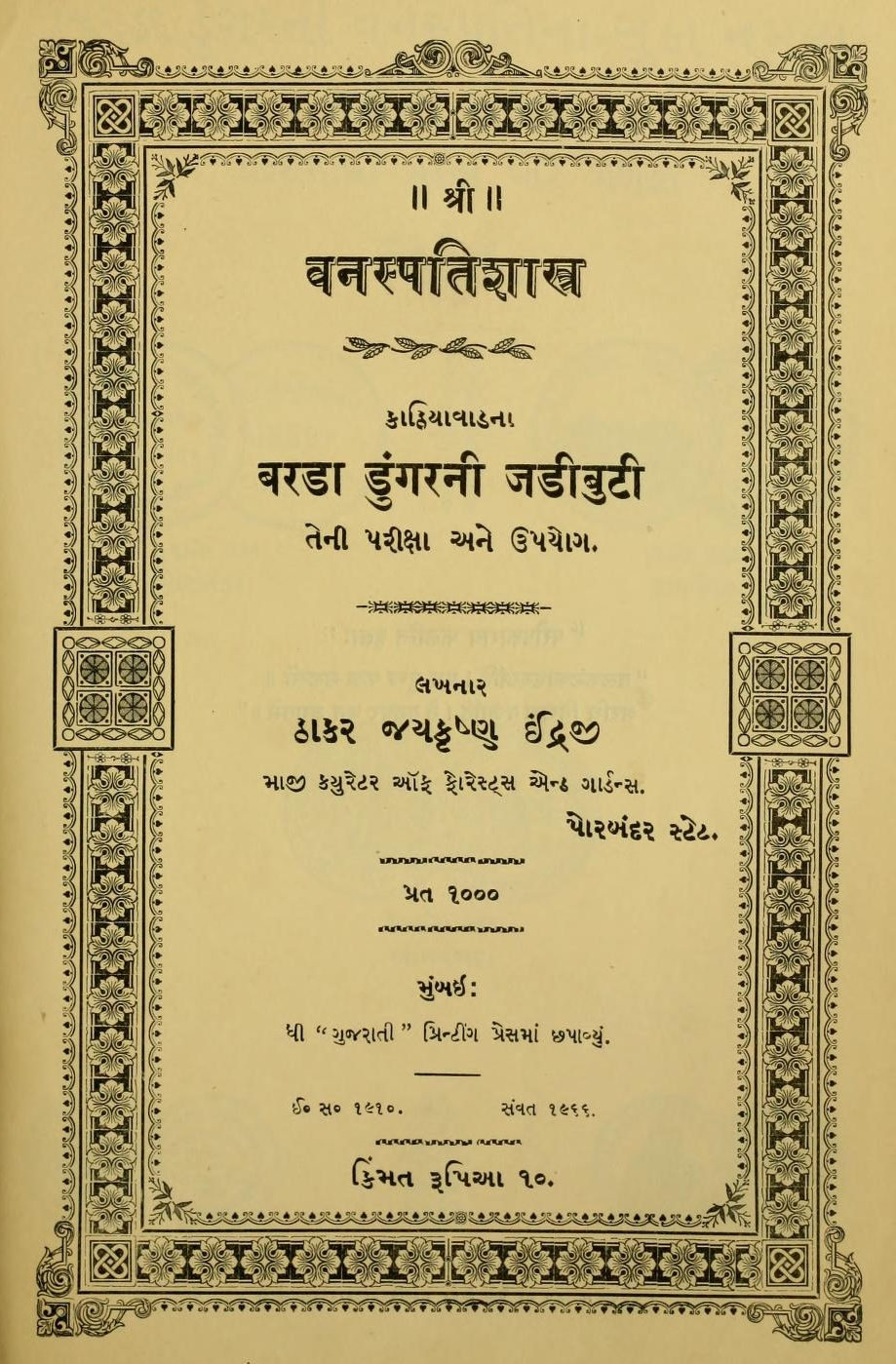
Title page of Indraji's 1910 book on the Flora of Barda Mountain

Herbert Mills Birdwood and MacNaghten attempted to help Indraji obtain a suitable employment but Indraji would not accept working with anyone but Bhagwan Lal. Through MacNaghten, the Maharaja of Porbander offered assistance for Indraji to study the flora of the Barda mountain. Frederick Styles Philpin Lely, the British administrator for Porbander also supported the project and Indraji was appointed as Curator of Forests and Gardens of the state of Porbander on 1 October 1886. Initially Indraji declined the offer as the salary was Rupees 100 a month but on the influence of MacNaghten and Lely this was increased to 200 and he took the offer. Jayakrishna worked with the local shepherd community, the Rabaris, to collect ethnobotanical information. One of his studies was on the lethal effects of Indigofera cordifolia on sheep that grazed them shortly after the rains. He worked for 19 years in the region and produced his magnum opus, on the Flora of Barda Mountain only in 1910. Although he was persuaded to write it in English, he chose to write it in Gujarati and titled it "Vanaspati Śāstra, A Complete and Comprehensive Account of the Flora of Barda Mountain". He wrote: "Europeans placed in their countries know and write about the plants of this country, and my countrymen would not know about the plants in their courtyard and those trampled under their feet. I will write the book in my mother tongue". When the manuscript of the book was ready, the Maharaja of Porbander had died and there was no monetary support for it. Finding a publisher was difficult. He once met Lalshankar Umashankar on a train and the latter offered to print the book through the Gujarat Vernacular Society on the condition that he removed the dedication page to the King of Porbander State. Indraji refused to accept the condition. He finally printed it at his own cost, pawning some of his wife's jewellery, and only a 1000 copies were printed with many left unsold that forced him to halve the price. He retired and moved to Kutch where the Maharaja of Kutch took an interest and made him Superintendent of the Palace and made him in-charge of reforestation and planting. He promoted the use of tree planting to block the expansion of dunes and wrote a book Plants of Kutch and Their Utility (1926) which included 99 line drawings.

== Personal life ==
Indraji married at the age of about 38 shortly after obtaining employment in Porbander State. Bhagwanlal gifted him Rs 200 to cover his wedding expenses. Dr Sakharam Arjun also made a similar contribution. The couple had two sons who died young but a daughter Sundarben survived and also took an interest in plants.

== Death and after ==
Jayakrishna died at Bhuj on 3 December 1929, Mahatma Gandhi wrote an obituary commenting that "...He had a vast collection of plants ... such men with unflinching devotion to their interest are rare. Let all of us emulate his single mindedness and self confidence."

Indraji's herbarium collection is partly preserved at the College of Agriculture, Pune. Indraji passed on his collections of books to Ayurveda scholar Bapalal Garbaddas Shah who wrote a biography of Indraji in Gujarati in 1931. This book was translated into English by Professor J.J. Shah in 1999.

== Cited sources ==
- Shah, J.J. (1999). Botanist Jaykrishnabhai: Life and Contributions. Charutar Vidya Mandal. OCLC 755417306.
