= Kurijan =

Kurijan or Kuri Jan or Koorijan (Persian: كوريجان) may refer to:

- Kuri Jan, Gilan
- Kurijan, Hamadan
