= Chapar Pord-e Zaman =

Village in Gilan province, Iran

Chapar Pord-e Zaman Persian: چپرپردزمان
- Village
- Location within Iran
- Coordinates: 37°26′35″N 49°43′46″E
- Country: Iran
- Province: Gilan
- County: Rasht
- District: Khoshk-e Bijar
- Rural District: Hajji Bekandeh-ye Khoshk-e Bijar

Population (2016)
  - Total: 873
- Time zone: UTC+3:30 (IRST)

Chapar Pord-e Zaman (Persian: چپرپردزمان) (Note: Also romanized as Chapar Pord-e Zamān; also known as Chapar Pūr-e Zamānī) is a village in Hajji Bekandeh-ye Khoshk-e Bijar Rural District of Khoshk-e Bijar District in Rasht County, Gilan province, Iran.

== Demographics ==
=== Population ===
At the time of the 2006 National Census, the village's population was 859 in 235 households. The following census in 2011 counted 919 people in 310 households. The 2016 census measured the population of the village as 873 people in 293 households.
