= Chapar Pord =

Village in Gilan province, Iran

Chapar Pord Persian: چپرپرد
- Village
- Location within Iran
- Coordinates: 37°26′41″N 49°42′42″E
- Country: Iran
- Province: Gilan
- County: Rasht
- District: Khoshk-e Bijar
- Rural District: Hajji Bekandeh-ye Khoshk-e Bijar

Population (2016)
  - Total: 955
- Time zone: UTC+3:30 (IRST)

Chapar Pord (Persian: چپرپرد) (Note: Also known as Chapar Pord-e Pā’īn and Chapar Pūr) is a village in Hajji Bekandeh-ye Khoshk-e Bijar Rural District of Khoshk-e Bijar District in Rasht County, Gilan province, Iran.

== Demographics ==
=== Population ===
At the time of the 2006 National Census, the village's population was 925 in 265 households. The following census in 2011 counted 926 people in 314 households. The 2016 census measured the population of the village as 955 people in 334 households.
