= Forshom =

Village in Gilan province, Iran

Forshom Persian: فرشم
- Village
- Location within Iran
- Coordinates: 37°20′11″N 49°45′39″E
- Country: Iran
- Province: Gilan
- County: Rasht
- District: Khoshk-e Bijar
- Rural District: Nowsher-e Khoshk-e Bijar

Population (2016)
  - Total: 541
  - Density: 1,041/km^{2} (2,700/sq mi)
- Time zone: UTC+3:30 (IRST)

Forshom (Persian: فرشم) is a village in Nowsher-e Khoshk-e Bijar Rural District of Khoshk-e Bijar District in Rasht County, Gilan province, Iran.

== Demographics ==
=== Population ===
At the time of the 2006 National Census, the village's population was 659 in 202 households. The following census in 2011 counted 581 people in 191 households. The 2016 census measured the population of the village as 541 people in 190 households.
