= Gol Bazu =

Gol Bazu گلبازو
- Village
- Location within Iran
- Coordinates: 37°22′49″N 49°49′09″E
- Country: Iran
- Province: Gilan
- County: Rasht
- Bakhsh: Khoshk-e Bijar
- Rural District: Nowsher-e Koshk-e Bijar

Population (2016)
  - Total: 121
- Time zone: UTC+3:30 (IRST)

Gol Bazu (Persian: گلبازو, also Romanized as Gol Bāzū; also known as Gol Bāzo) is a village in Nowsher-e Koshk-e Bijar Rural District, Khoshk-e Bijar District, Rasht County, Gilan Province, Iran. At the 2016 census, its population was 121, in 40 families. Up from 109 in 2006.
