= Jirsar-e Vishka =

Jirsar-e Vishka جيرسرويشكا
- Village
- Location within Iran
- Coordinates: 37°20′09″N 49°43′58″E
- Country: Iran
- Province: Gilan
- County: Rasht
- Bakhsh: Khoshk-e Bijar
- Rural District: Nowsher-e Koshk-e Bijar

Population (2006)
  - Total: 566
- Time zone: UTC+3:30 (IRST)

Jirsar-e Vishka (Persian: جيرسرويشكا, also Romanized as Jīrsar-e Vīshkā; also known as Jīrsar-e Vīshkāh) is a village in Nowsher-e Koshk-e Bijar Rural District, Khoshk-e Bijar District, Rasht County, Gilan Province, Iran. At the 2016 census, its population was 401, in 134 families. This was a decrease from 566 people in 2006. The village has 175 hectares under rice cultivation.
