= Neysa Chah =

Neysa Chah نيساچاه
- Village
- Location within Iran
- Coordinates: 37°24′33″N 49°46′20″E
- Country: Iran
- Province: Gilan
- County: Rasht
- Bakhsh: Khoshk-e Bijar
- Rural District: Nowsher-e Koshk-e Bijar

Population (2006)
  - Total: 106
- Time zone: UTC+3:30 (IRST)

Neysa Chah (Persian: نيساچاه, also Romanized as Neysā Chāh; also known as Nesā Chāh) is a village in Nowsher-e Koshk-e Bijar Rural District, Khoshk-e Bijar District, Rasht County, Gilan Province, Iran. As of the 2016 census, its population was 77 people in 32 households, Down from 106 people in 2006.
