= Vishka =

Village in Gilan province, Iran

Vishka Persian: ويشكا
- Village
- Location within Iran
- Coordinates: 37°20′38″N 49°44′13″E
- Country: Iran
- Province: Gilan
- County: Rasht
- District: Khoshk-e Bijar
- Rural District: Nowsher-e Khoshk-e Bijar

Population (2016)
  - Total: 502
  - Density: 1,041/km^{2} (2,700/sq mi)
- Time zone: UTC+3:30 (IRST)

Vishka (Persian: ويشكا) (Note: Also romanized as Vīshkā; also known as Vīshkāh and Vīshkāh-e Bālā Maḩalleh) is a village in Nowsher-e Khoshk-e Bijar Rural District of Khoshk-e Bijar District in Rasht County, Gilan province, Iran.

== Demographics ==
=== Population ===
At the time of the 2006 National Census, the village's population was 1,157 in 324 households. The following census in 2011 counted 1,132 people in 345 households. The 2016 census measured the population of the village as 1,041 people in 357 households.
