= Shisheh Gurab =

Shisheh Gurab شيشه گوراب
- Village
- Location within Iran
- Coordinates: 37°23′31″N 49°47′38″E
- Country: Iran
- Province: Gilan
- County: Rasht
- Bakhsh: Khoshk-e Bijar
- Rural District: Nowsher-e Koshk-e Bijar

Population (2006)
  - Total: 479
- Time zone: UTC+3:30 (IRST)

Shisheh Gurab (Persian: شيشه گوراب, also Romanized as Shīsheh Gūrāb and Shisheh Goorab; also known as Shishkurab) is a village in Nowsher-e Koshk-e Bijar Rural District, Khoshk-e Bijar District, Rasht County, Gilan Province, Iran. At the 2016 census, its population was 380, in 137 families. Decreased from 479 people in 2006.
