= Basteh Deym =

Village in Gilan province, Iran

Basteh Deym Persian: بسته ديم
- Village
- Location within Iran
- Coordinates: 37°22′46″N 49°44′32″E
- Country: Iran
- Province: Gilan
- County: Rasht
- District: Khoshk-e Bijar
- Rural District: Nowsher-e Khoshk-e Bijar

Population (2016)
  - Total: 502
- Time zone: UTC+3:30 (IRST)

Basteh Deym (Persian: بسته ديم) (Note: Also romanized as Basteh Dīm; also known as Basadim) is a village in Nowsher-e Khoshk-e Bijar Rural District of Khoshk-e Bijar District in Rasht County, Gilan province, Iran.

== Demographics ==
=== Population ===
At the time of the 2006 National Census, the village's population was 397 in 110 households. The following census in 2011 counted 434 people in 137 households. The 2016 census measured the population of the village as 502 people in 169 households.
