= Baghcheh Boneh =

Baghcheh Boneh باغچه بنه
- Village
- Location within Iran
- Coordinates: 37°23′47″N 49°46′11″E
- Country: Iran
- Province: Gilan
- County: Rasht
- Bakhsh: Khoshk-e Bijar
- Rural District: Nowsher-e Koshk-e Bijar

Population (2006)
  - Total: 347
- Time zone: UTC+3:30 (IRST)

Baghcheh Boneh (Persian: باغچه بنه, also Romanized as Bāghcheh Boneh; also known as Bag-Chabane) is a village in Nowsher-e Koshk-e Bijar Rural District, Khoshk-e Bijar District, Rasht County, Gilan Province, Iran. At the 2016 census, its population was 342, in 124 families.
