= Gileva Mahalleh =

Village in Gilan province, Iran

Gileva Mahalleh Persian: گيلوامحله
- Village
- Location within Iran
- Coordinates: 37°25′47″N 49°47′35″E
- Country: Iran
- Province: Gilan
- County: Rasht
- District: Khoshk-e Bijar
- Rural District: Hajji Bekandeh-ye Khoshk-e Bijar

Population (2016)
  - Total: 494
- Time zone: UTC+3:30 (IRST)

Gileva Mahalleh (Persian: گيلوامحله) (Note: Also romanized as Gīlevā Maḩalleh and Gilvā Maḩalleh) is a village in Hajji Bekandeh-ye Khoshk-e Bijar Rural District of Khoshk-e Bijar District in Rasht County, Gilan province, Iran.

== Demographics ==
=== Population ===
At the time of the 2006 National Census, the village's population was 473 in 141 households. The following census in 2011 counted 74 people in 24 households. The 2016 census measured the population of the village as 494 people in 172 households.
