= Moridan, Rasht =

Village in Gilan province, Iran

Moridan Persian: مريدان
- Village
- Location within Iran
- Coordinates: 37°21′24″N 49°46′12″E
- Country: Iran
- Province: Gilan
- County: Rasht
- District: Khoshk-e Bijar
- Rural District: Nowsher-e Khoshk-e Bijar

Population (2016)
  - Total: 502
  - Density: 593/km^{2} (1,540/sq mi)
- Time zone: UTC+3:30 (IRST)

Moridan (Persian: مريدان) (Note: Also romanized as Morīdān) is a village in Nowsher-e Khoshk-e Bijar Rural District of Khoshk-e Bijar District in Rasht County, Gilan province, Iran.

== Demographics ==
=== Population ===
At the time of the 2006 National Census, the village's population was 664 in 181 households. The following census in 2011 counted 632 people in 200 households. The 2016 census measured the population of the village as 593 people in 206 households.
