= Sar Khoshki =

Village in Gilan province, Iran

Sar Khoshki Persian: سرخشکی
- Village
- Location within Iran
- Coordinates: 37°25′34″N 49°42′40″E
- Country: Iran
- Province: Gilan
- County: Rasht
- District: Khoshk-e Bijar
- Rural District: Hajji Bekandeh-ye Khoshk-e Bijar

Population (2016)
  - Total: 793
- Time zone: UTC+3:30 (IRST)

Sar Khoshki (Persian: سرخشکی) (Note: Also romanized as Sar Khoshkī; also known as Khoshk, Khoshkī, Khūshg, and Khushki) is a village in Hajji Bekandeh-ye Khoshk-e Bijar Rural District of Khoshk-e Bijar District in Rasht County, Gilan province, Iran.

== Demographics ==
=== Population ===
At the time of the 2006 National Census, the village's population was 857 in 233 households. The following census in 2011 counted 864 people in 274 households. The 2016 census measured the population of the village as 793 people in 272 households.
