= Jurkuyeh =

Village in Gilan province, Iran

Jurkuyeh Persian: جوركويه
- Village
- Location within Iran
- Coordinates: 37°21′51″N 49°47′30″E
- Country: Iran
- Province: Gilan
- County: Rasht
- District: Khoshk-e Bijar
- Rural District: Nowsher-e Khoshk-e Bijar

Population (2016)
  - Total: 561
- Time zone: UTC+3:30 (IRST)

Jurkuyeh (Persian: جوركويه) (Note: Also romanized as Jūrkūyeh) is a village in Nowsher-e Khoshk-e Bijar Rural District of Khoshk-e Bijar District in Rasht County, Gilan province, Iran.

== Demographics ==
=== Population ===
At the time of the 2006 National Census, the village's population was 744 in 225 households. The following census in 2011 counted 663 people in 235 households. The 2016 census measured the population of the village as 561 people in 204 households.
