= Pir Ali Deh =

Village in Gilan province, Iran

Pir Ali Deh Persian: پيرعلي ده
- Village
- Location within Iran
- Coordinates: 37°25′37″N 49°44′08″E
- Country: Iran
- Province: Gilan
- County: Rasht
- District: Khoshk-e Bijar
- Rural District: Hajji Bekandeh-ye Khoshk-e Bijar

Population (2016)
  - Total: 520
- Time zone: UTC+3:30 (IRST)

Pir Ali Deh (Persian: پيرعلي ده) (Note: Also romanized as Pīr ‘Alī Deh) is a village in Hajji Bekandeh-ye Khoshk-e Bijar Rural District of Khoshk-e Bijar District in Rasht County, Gilan province, Iran.

== Demographics ==
=== Population ===
At the time of the 2006 National Census, the village's population was 604 in 161 households. The following census in 2011 counted 584 people in 178 households. The 2016 census measured the population of the village as 520 people in 178 households.
