= Mashal Alam =

Mashal Alam ماشال اعلم
- Village
- Location within Iran
- Coordinates: 37°22′57″N 49°46′39″E
- Country: Iran
- Province: Gilan
- County: Rasht
- Bakhsh: Khoshk-e Bijar
- Rural District: Nowsher-e Koshk-e Bijar

Population (2006)
  - Total: 202
- Time zone: UTC+3:30 (IRST)

Mashal Alam (Persian: ماشال اعلم, also Romanized as Māshāl A‘lam; also known as Māshal) is a village in Nowsher-e Koshk-e Bijar Rural District, Khoshk-e Bijar District, Rasht County, Gilan Province, Iran. At the 2016 census, its population was 177 within 64 families. Down from 202 people in 2006.
