= Akbar Badshah =

Pakistani cricketer

Personal information
- Full name: Akbar Badshah
- Born: 15 December 1985 (age 40); Nowshera, North-West Frontier Province, Pakistan
- Batting: Right-handed
- Bowling: Right-arm off break
- Role: Batsman

Domestic team information
- Years: Team
- 2001/02–2018/19: Peshawar
- 2010/11–2011/12: Khyber Pakhtunkhwa
- 2007/08–2014/15: Peshawar Panthers
- 2013/14: Pakistan Television

Career statistics
Competition	First-class	List A	Twenty20
Matches	96	47	15
Runs scored	4,391	979	197
Batting average	30.49	30.59	17.90
100s/50s	8/23	1/4	0/0
Top score	143*	102*	39*
Balls bowled	4,203	1,094	234
Wickets	40	23	5
Bowling average	47.97	37.69	54.40
5 wickets in innings	0	0	0
10 wickets in match	0	0	0
Best bowling	3/8	2/11	2/36
Catches/stumpings	41/–	5/–	4/–
- Source: Cricinfo, 14 April 2026

Akbar Badshah (born 15 December 1985) is a Pakistani former cricketer. Badshah was a right-handed batsman who bowled right-arm off break. He was born in Nowshera, North-West Frontier Province.

Badshah made his senior domestic debut in the 2001/02 season and went on to represent Peshawar in first-class cricket for much of his career. He later also played first-class cricket for Khyber Pakhtunkhwa, and in limited-overs cricket he represented Peshawar Panthers and Pakistan Television. He made his Twenty20 debut for Peshawar Panthers against Multan Tigers in the 2010–11 National T20 Cup.

One of Badshah's most notable seasons came in 2011/12. In November 2011, he and Mohammad Rizwan both scored centuries for Peshawar against Karachi Whites in the Quaid-e-Azam Trophy, with Badshah making 122 on the second day before going on to score 143 not out, then the highest first-class score of his career. The following month, captaining Peshawar in the Division Two final, he shared an unbroken century partnership with Jamaluddin to complete a six-wicket victory over Sui Northern Gas Pipelines Limited and secure promotion to Division One.

Badshah remained a regular for Peshawar through the mid-2010s. In November 2015, he scored an unbeaten 106 against United Bank Limited in the 2015–16 Quaid-e-Azam Trophy. In September 2018, he made 114 not out for Peshawar against Khan Research Laboratories in the opening round of the 2018–19 Quaid-e-Azam Trophy. Later that season, as Peshawar captain, he scored 49 against Habib Bank Limited in the Super Eight stage of the same competition.

Badshah played 96 first-class matches. In these, he scored 4,391 runs at a batting average of 30.49, making 23 half-centuries and 8 centuries.
