= Talesh Mahalleh, Rasht =

Village in Gilan province, Iran

Talesh Mahalleh Persian: طالش محله
- Village
- Location within Iran
- Coordinates: 37°26′43″N 49°46′38″E
- Country: Iran
- Province: Gilan
- County: Rasht
- District: Khoshk-e Bijar
- Rural District: Hajji Bekandeh-ye Khoshk-e Bijar

Population (2016)
  - Total: 327
- Time zone: UTC+3:30 (IRST)

Talesh Mahalleh (Persian: طالش محله) (Note: Also romanized as Ţālesh Maḩalleh) is a village in Hajji Bekandeh-ye Khoshk-e Bijar Rural District of Khoshk-e Bijar District in Rasht County, Gilan province, Iran.

== Demographics ==
=== Population ===
At the time of the 2006 National Census, the village's population was 345 in 101 households. The following census in 2011 counted 384 people in 127 households. The 2016 census measured the population of the village as 327 people in 121 households.
