= Siah Estalakh-e Mirza Rabi =

Siah Estalakh-e Mirza Rabi سياه اسطلخ ميرزاربيع
- Village
- Interactive map of Siah Estalakh-e Mirza Rabi
- Coordinates: 37°24′21″N 49°45′31″E
- Country: Iran
- Province: Gilan
- County: Rasht
- Bakhsh: Khoshk-e Bijar
- Rural District: Nowsher-e Koshk-e Bijar

Population (2006)
  - Total: 460
- Time zone: UTC+3:30 (IRST)

Siah Estalakh-e Mirza Rabi (Persian: سياه اسطلخ ميرزاربيع, also Romanized as Sīāh Esţalakh-e Mīrzā Rabīʿ) is a village in Nowsher-e Koshk-e Bijar Rural District, Khoshk-e Bijar District, Rasht County, Gilan Province, Iran. At the 2016 census, its population was 427, in 150 families. Down from 460 in 2006.
