= Bagh-e Amir Bekandeh =

Village in Gilan province, Iran

Bagh-e Amir Bekandeh Persian: باغ اميربكنده
- Village
- Location within Iran
- Coordinates: 37°26′48″N 49°44′53″E
- Country: Iran
- Province: Gilan
- County: Rasht
- District: Khoshk-e Bijar
- Rural District: Hajji Bekandeh-ye Khoshk-e Bijar

Population (2016)
  - Total: 506
- Time zone: UTC+3:30 (IRST)

Bagh-e Amir Bekandeh (Persian: باغ اميربكنده) (Note: Also romanized as Bāgh-e Amīr Bekandeh; also known as Bag and Bāgh) is a village in Hajji Bekandeh-ye Khoshk-e Bijar Rural District of Khoshk-e Bijar District in Rasht County, Gilan province, Iran.

== Demographics ==
=== Population ===
At the time of the 2006 National Census, the village's population was 575 in 187 households. The following census in 2011 counted 538 people in 172 households. The 2016 census measured the population of the village as 506 people in 192 households.
