= Alman, Khoshk-e Bijar =

Alman المان
- Village
- Location within Iran
- Coordinates: 37°23′29″N 49°45′07″E
- Country: Iran
- Province: Gilan
- County: Rasht
- Bakhsh: Khoshk-e Bijar
- Rural District: Nowsher-e Koshk-e Bijar

Population (2016)
  - Total: 395
- Time zone: UTC+3:30 (IRST)

Alman (Persian: المان, also Romanized as Ālmān) is a village in Nowsher-e Koshk-e Bijar Rural District, Khoshk-e Bijar District, Rasht County, Gilan Province, Iran. According to the 2016 census, its population was 395, residing in 128 households. Increased from 262 people in 2006.
