= Siah Estalakh-e Saqad ol Molk =

Village in Gilan province, Iran

Siah Estalakh-e Saqad ol Molk Persian: سیاه‌اسطلخ سقطالملک
- Village
- Location within Iran
- Coordinates: 37°24′40″N 49°44′55″E
- Country: Iran
- Province: Gilan
- County: Rasht
- District: Khoshk-e Bijar
- Rural District: Hajji Bekandeh-ye Khoshk-e Bijar

Population (2016)
  - Total: 370
- Time zone: UTC+3:30 (IRST)

Siah Estalakh-e Saqad ol Molk (Persian: سیاه‌اسطلخ سقطالملک) (Note: Also romanized as Sīāh Esţalakh-e S̄aqad ol Molk; also known as Sīāh Asţalaskh, Sīāh Asţalaskh-e S̄aqad ol Molk, and Sīāh Esţalakh) is a village in Hajji Bekandeh-ye Khoshk-e Bijar Rural District of Khoshk-e Bijar District in Rasht County, Gilan province, Iran.

== Demographics ==
=== Population ===
At the time of the 2006 National Census, the village's population was 422 in 125 households. The following census in 2011 counted 376 people in 123 households. The 2016 census measured the population of the village as 370 people in 135 households.
