= Nowshera =

Nowshera (with alternative spellings Nowshehra and Naushera) may refer to:

== Places ==
=== India ===
- Nowshera, Jammu and Kashmir, a town and tehsil in Rajauri district
  - Nowshera Assembly constituency
  - Naushera Tawi River or Manawar Tawi River
- Nowshera, Srinagar, a notified area in Jammu and Kashmir
- Naushera, Budaun, a village in Uttar Pradesh

=== Iran ===
- Nowshahr, a port city in the province of Mazandaran in northern Iran
- Noshahr County, a county in Mazandaran Province in Iran. The capital of the county is Noshahr

=== Pakistan ===
- Naushera, Punjab, a town and Tehsil of Khushab District in Punjab
- Nowshera Virkan, a town and Tehsil of Gujranwala District in Punjab
- Nowshera District, Khyber Pakhtunkhwa province
  - Nowshera, Khyber Pakhtunkhwa, a city in Nowshera district
  - Nowshera Cantonment, a cantonment adjacent to Nowshera
  - Nowshera Tehsil
- Rahim Yar Khan District, known until 1881 as "Naushehra"

== See also ==
- Nowshar (disambiguation)
- Nowshahr (disambiguation)
- Nosher (disambiguation)
- Nowshera Brigade, an Infantry formation of the Indian Army during World War II
- Battle of Nowshera, a battle was fought in March 1823 between the forces of Pashtun tribesmen against the Army of Maharaja Ranjit Singh
- Naushehra Pannuan, a village in Punjab, India
