= Aarey Forest =

Aarey Forest Aarey Colony
- Neighbourhood
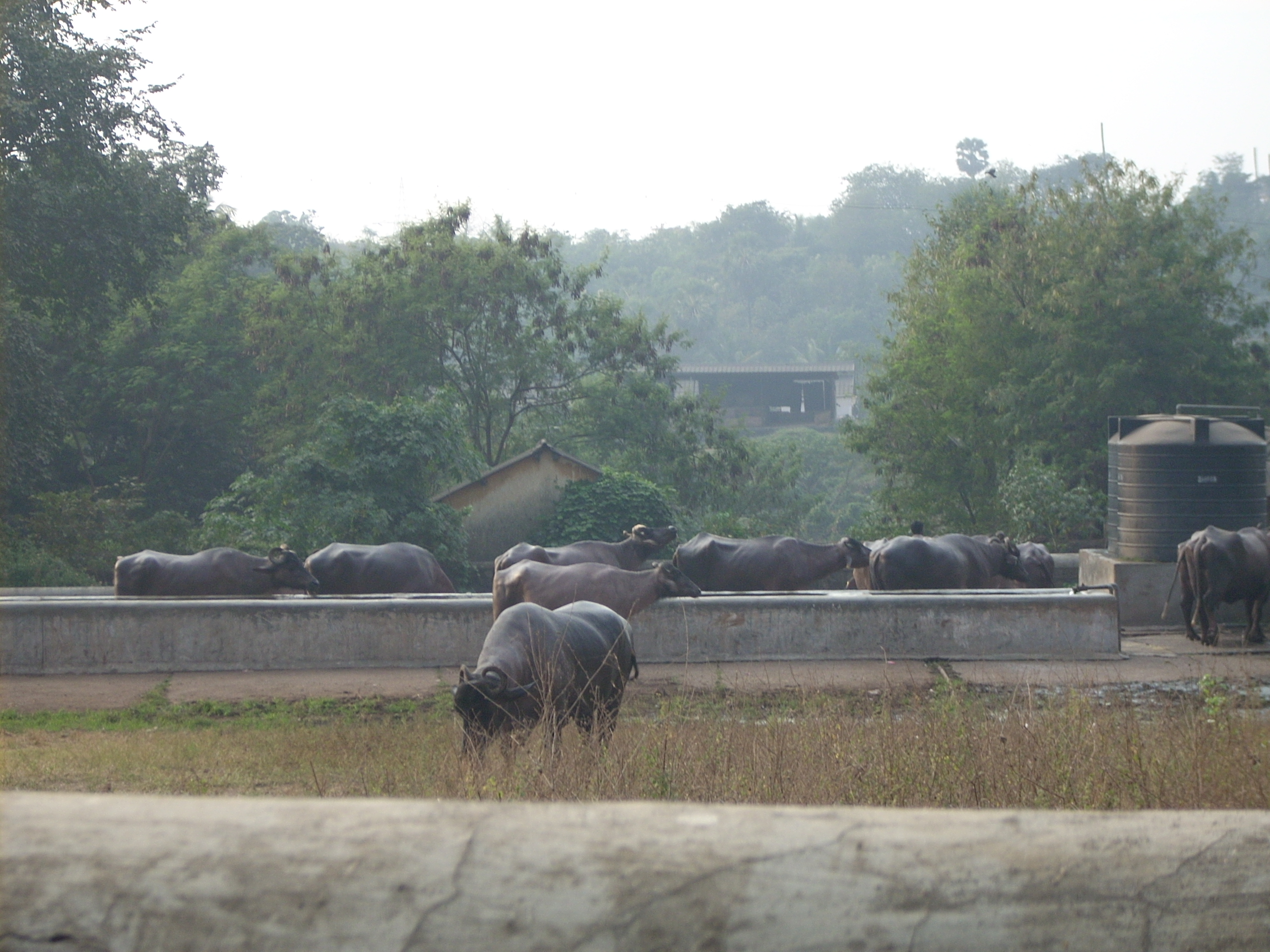
- Buffaloes grazing in a dairy farm at Aarey Colony

- Location within Mumbai
- Coordinates: 19°9′27″N 72°52′28″E
- Country: India
- State: Maharashtra
- Region: Konkan
- City: Mumbai
- District: Mumbai Suburban
- Locality: Goregaon (East)
- Established: 1949
- Founder: Govt. Of India

Government
  - Type: Municipal Corporation
  - Body: Brihanmumbai Municipal Corporation (MCGM)

Area
  - Total: 16 km^{2} (6.2 sq mi)

Languages
  - Official: Marathi
- Time zone: UTC+5:30 (IST)
- PIN: 400 065
- Area code: 022
- Website: Aarey Dairy

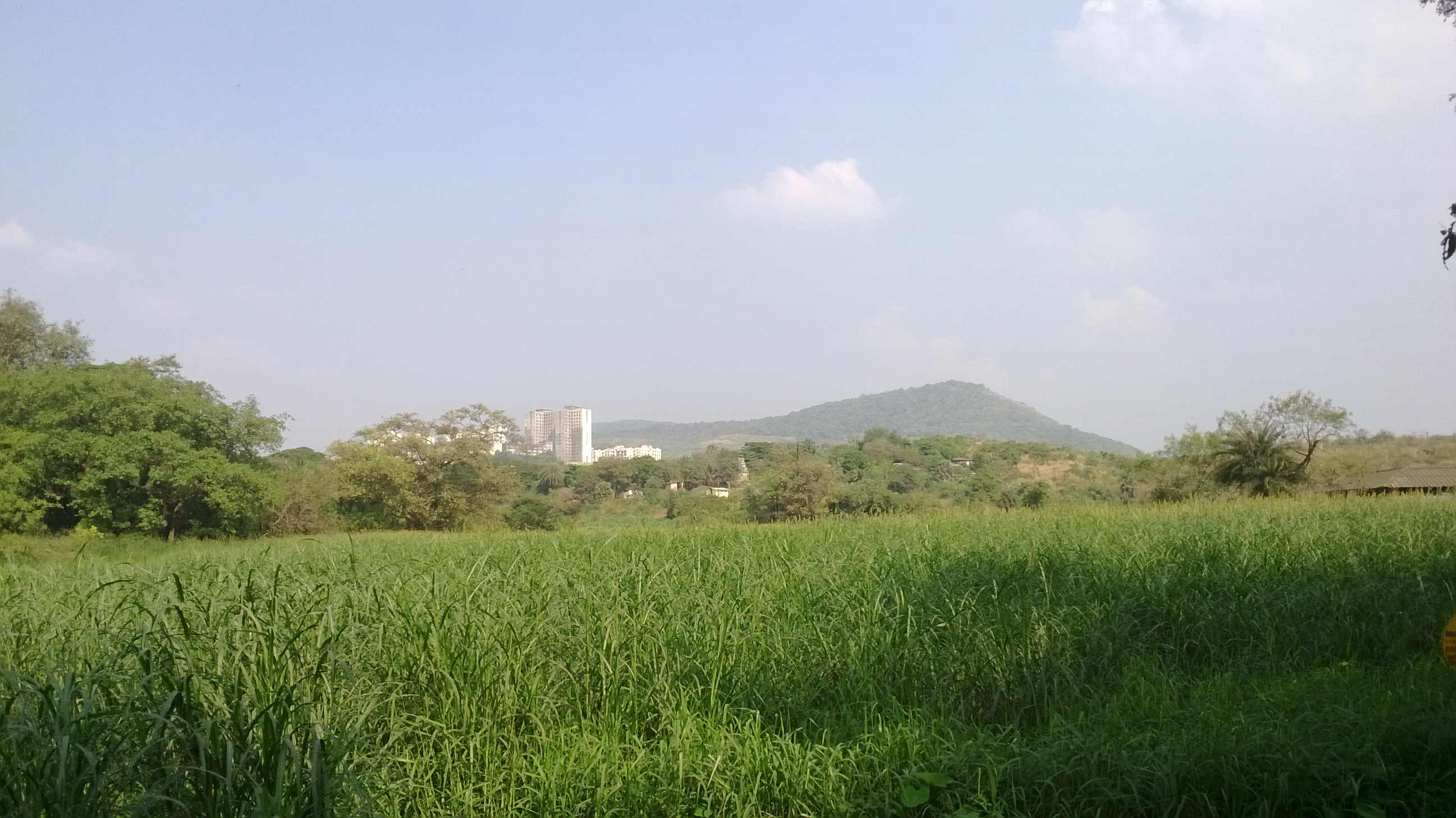
Open grassland in Aarey Colony

Aarey Forest is within Sanjay Gandhi National Park (SGNP). Of which 25.6% (812 acres) are classified as mixed moist deciduous type forest. It acts as a buffer between SGNP and the city, being one of the few green spaces (spread over 2000 acres) left in Mumbai. On 3 September 2020, the Maharashtra government declared one fifth of the Aarey Colony, an area of approximately 600 acres, as a reserved forest.

The Colony is a neighbourhood situated in Goregaon (East), a suburb of the city of Mumbai, India. It was established in 1949 to revolutionize the processing and marketing of dairy products in the city.

The name comes up as ‘Areyn’ in Bombay Government records of 1836, according to which Ardesar Dadaji, a Parsee businessman, had been granted the villages of Malhar, Dysar, Magatney, Tulsi, Areyn, Eksar, Kanari and part of Pahadi in lieu of land in the Fort.

== Flora and fauna ==
Aarey Colony has an array of wild life and several species of insects, butterflies and birds. It has at least 86 species of trees and 22 species of birds. A recent report submitted to the state highlights the rich biodiversity inside Aarey. There are about 290 species of wild life in Aarey Colony including 5 such species of animals which feature in the International Union for Conservation of Nature (IUCN). These vulnerable animals include leopards, Rusty spotted cat, Sambar deer, Alexandrine Parakeet and Red-wattled Lapwing.

=== Leopards of Aarey ===
Aarey is known to have potential to show human-leopard co-existence in an urban setting. There are 4 adult females named Adarsh Nagar (after the locality she used to frequent), Bindu, Chandani ( 3 legged leopard) and Luna. The leopards are monitored by camera traps, first set up in 2015. The Forest Department has joined hands with citizen groups to observe and learn about leopard behavior. An RTI has revealed that from 2016 to 2018, seven leopards have been rescued. While Aarey has been infamous for leopard attacks, research by Centre for Wildlife Studies revealed that leopards are actually afraid of humans and highlighted that poor garbage disposal and newly released leopards in a new environment have caused attacks. Vidya Athreya, an ecologist, pointed out that leopards being around was never a big issue among residents of these areas, it is only a recent demand. She also pointed out that this is an urban dwellers' issue as people in rural areas experience less attacks and no death has occurred in Ahemadnagar, for instance, despite having a higher leopard count. A leopard was allegedly carrying away a 4-year-old boy in Aarey Colony, The boy was rescued after alert locals intervened in the nick of time.

=== Species of Aarey ===
Aarey contributes about 90 species of butterflies (including plain tiger, striped tiger, common crow, chocolate pansy, common Mormon), 8 species of reptiles, 12 amphibian species, 77 different avifauna (birdlife) species, and 6 species of venomous snakes. Caecilian, a rare snake-like amphibian, was also discovered in the interiors of Aarey.

=== Discovery of new species ===
2019: a spider was discovered, Jerzego sunillimay. This is the first ever species of the genus Jerzego whose taxonomic details, mating behaviour, and egg development have been documented. It is the fourth species under this genus in the world and second from India.

2017: two species of jumping spiders, Langelurillus onyx and Langelurillus lacteus, were discovered. Published in a journal Zootaxa, claims significance in terms of biogeography as a first for any African genus spider species discovered in Asia

2016: the first ground-dwelling gecko, Cyrtodactylus varadgirii, discovered from Aarey in the last 130 years from India

2014: a species of tarantula, Heterophrictus aareyensus, discovered spotted near the government guesthouse having similarity to tarantula species from the African continent

2012: a trapdoor spider, Idiops rubrolimbatus, discovered and published in the Journal of Arachnology

2011: a species of scorpion, Lychas aareyensis, discovered and published in the Journal of Threatened Taxa.

** In all there are 90 different types of spiders, including five species of tarantulas and six species of scorpions

== Tribes of Aarey Forest ==
There are around 27 tribal hamlets (known as padas in Marathi) and other smaller hamlets in Aarey. Some of tribes that the original inhabitants belong to are Katkaris, Mahadev Kolis, Malhar Koli and Warlis The tribal in the area farm and cultivate various fruits and vegetables among other which are then sold in markets for a livelihood. They have suffered on account of basic amenities not provided by the government and also the rapid degradation of the forest and drive to displace tribes has impacted their sustainable lifestyle and means of livelihood.

Tribal Padas in Aarey
No.	Name of Padas
1	Keltipada
2	Damupada
3	Chafyachapada
4	Naushachapada
5	Futkyachapada
6	Nimbarpada
7	Prajapurpada
8	Vaanichapada
9	Bhurikhanpada
10	Khambachapada
11	Khadakpada
12	Gaondevipada
13	Habalpada
14	Devipada
15	Saibangodapada
16	Maroshipada
17	Charandevpada
18	Jivachapada
19	Morachapada
20	Ultanpada
21	Navapada
22	Nangarmundipada
23	Navapada 2
24	Dongripada
25	Prajapurpada - Modern Bakery
26	Jitonichapada
27	Kambatpada

== Aarey as an archaeological site ==
The Mumbai-Salsette exploration project, BARC (Bhabha Atomic Research Centre) and CEMS (Centre for Extra-Mural Studies) found relics and artefacts dating back to the Shilahara dynasty / Sheelar Yadav period (765 - 1029 AD) in Aarey. These findings threw new light on Aarey as an archaeological site with significant historical and cultural importance. The team of 6 experts and 40 archeology students found remains of old settlements and a Kuldevi temple site of the Malhar Koli community at Ultan Pada. They also found five Gaodevi statues, a waghoba (lion) statue, a kichka (pillar bracket) worshiped as a Ganesha statue and a further statue yet to be identified. Remains of a Diggar temple were also found from the same period. Only 7 padas were covered in this exploration. Aarey is undoubtedly important in constructing the history of Mumbai. The examined padas include Kelti pada, Marol police quarters, Chhota Kashmir, Marol Toll Naka and Maroshi. In 2017 construction workers found an artefact in the Metro III proposed car shed area. This pillar like structure dates back to 12th - 14th century. Many of the relics found were being used as statues of local deities. These new archaeological findings became another reason to protect the forest. Archaeologists have also found that Aarey and Prajapur used to be important towns as early as 200 BC being part of an important trade route of that time.

== Aarey Milk Colony ==
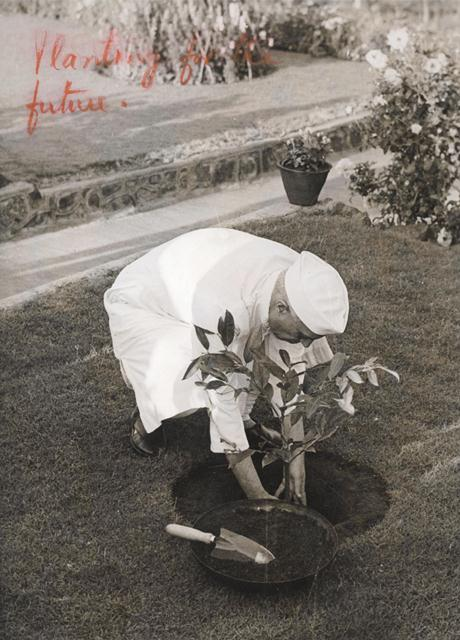
Pandit Jawaharlal Nehru, former PM of India, planting a sapling. Photograph taken during the inauguration of Aarey Colony on 4 March 1951.

Aarey Milk Colony at Goregaon (East) was established in 1949 and in 1951 the dairy at Aarey was inaugurated by the then Prime Minister, Pandit Jawaharlal Nehru.

The colony was the vision of Mr Dara Khurody, a pioneer of dairy sector who shared the '1963 Ramon Magsaysay Award' with Dr Verghese Kurien for revolutionizing the processing and marketing of milk in Mumbai.

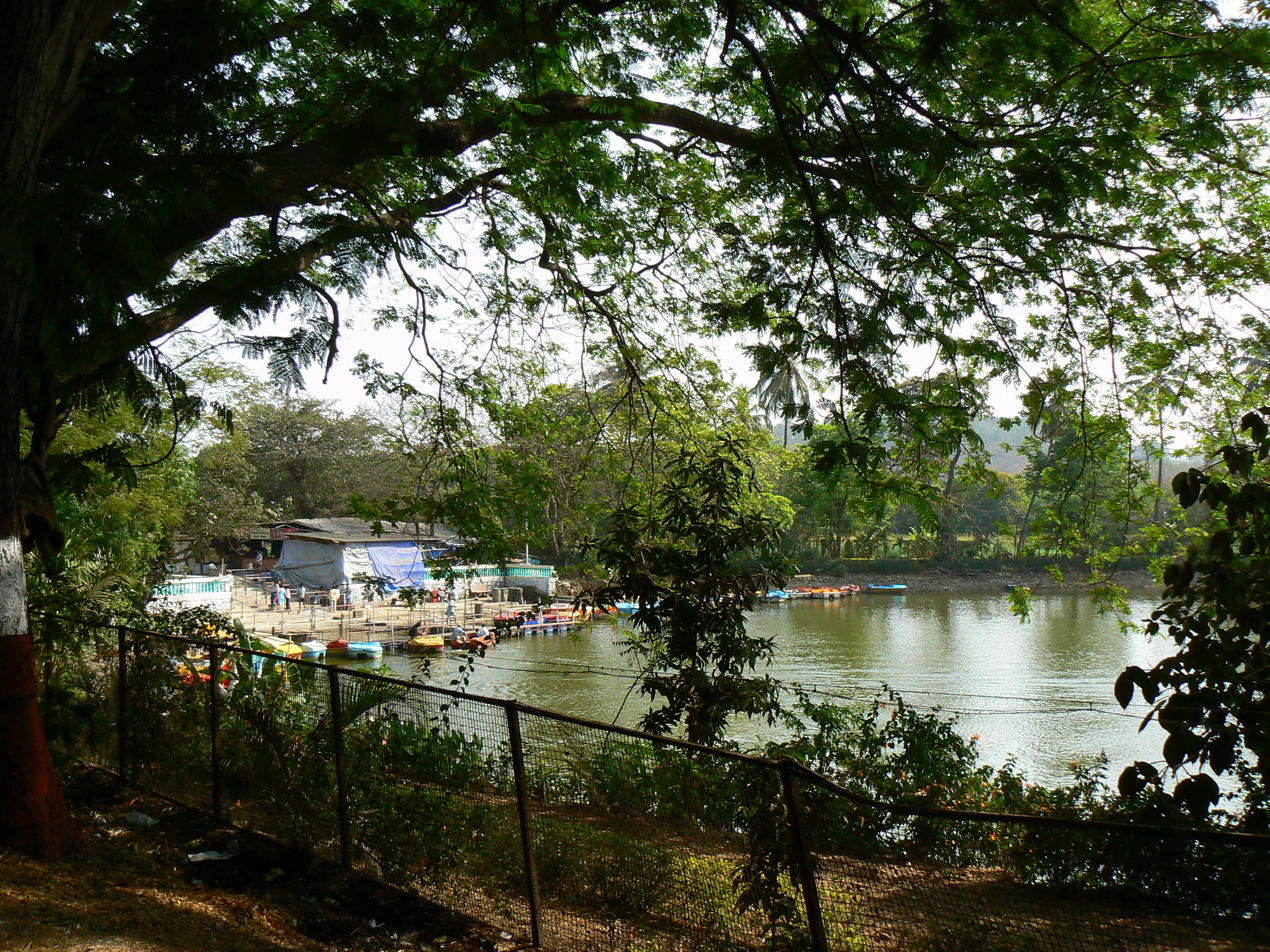
Lake at Chhota Kashmir

Aarey Forest includes 12 villages: Sai, Gundgav, Film City, Royal Palms, Dindoshi (Eksar Pahad), Aarey, Pahadi Goregaon, Vyraval, Kondivita, Maroshi (Marol), Parjapur, and Paspoli. In 1977, around 200 ha (490 acres) of land was carved out from Aarey village to establish Film City. The colony is spread over 16 km^{2} (6 mi^{2}) and is located off the Western Express Highway (WEH). Among the popular attractions in Aarey are Chhota Kashmir with a lake and a picnic spot.

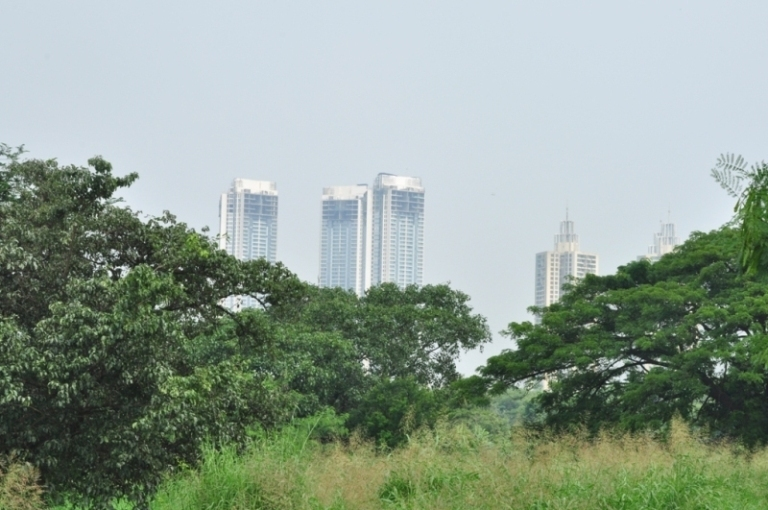
Aarey, a green belt zone (foreground) in contrast with the high-rises of Goregaon suburb (background)

The colony also has gardens, a nursery, lakes, an observation pavilion, picnic facilities, and milk plants. 16,000 cattle are reared on 1,287 ha (3,180 acres) of land, and 32 cattle farms. The management of all these is outsourced to a private firm every two years. Film City is frequently used for movie shoots.

There is a road within the colony built by the Maharashtra Public Works Department that connects the WEH to Powai. The Aarey Colony administration earlier collected toll from the users of the road. In 2014, the MCGM took over the road and ended the collection of the toll. It is also the location of the proposed carshed and depot for Line 3 of the Mumbai Metro.

A plan was mooted in 2010 to extend the existing Byculla Zoo in South Mumbai by building a zoo with no enclosures on land that would be acquired from both the colony as well as the adjacent Sanjay Gandhi National Park.

== Ownership pattern ==
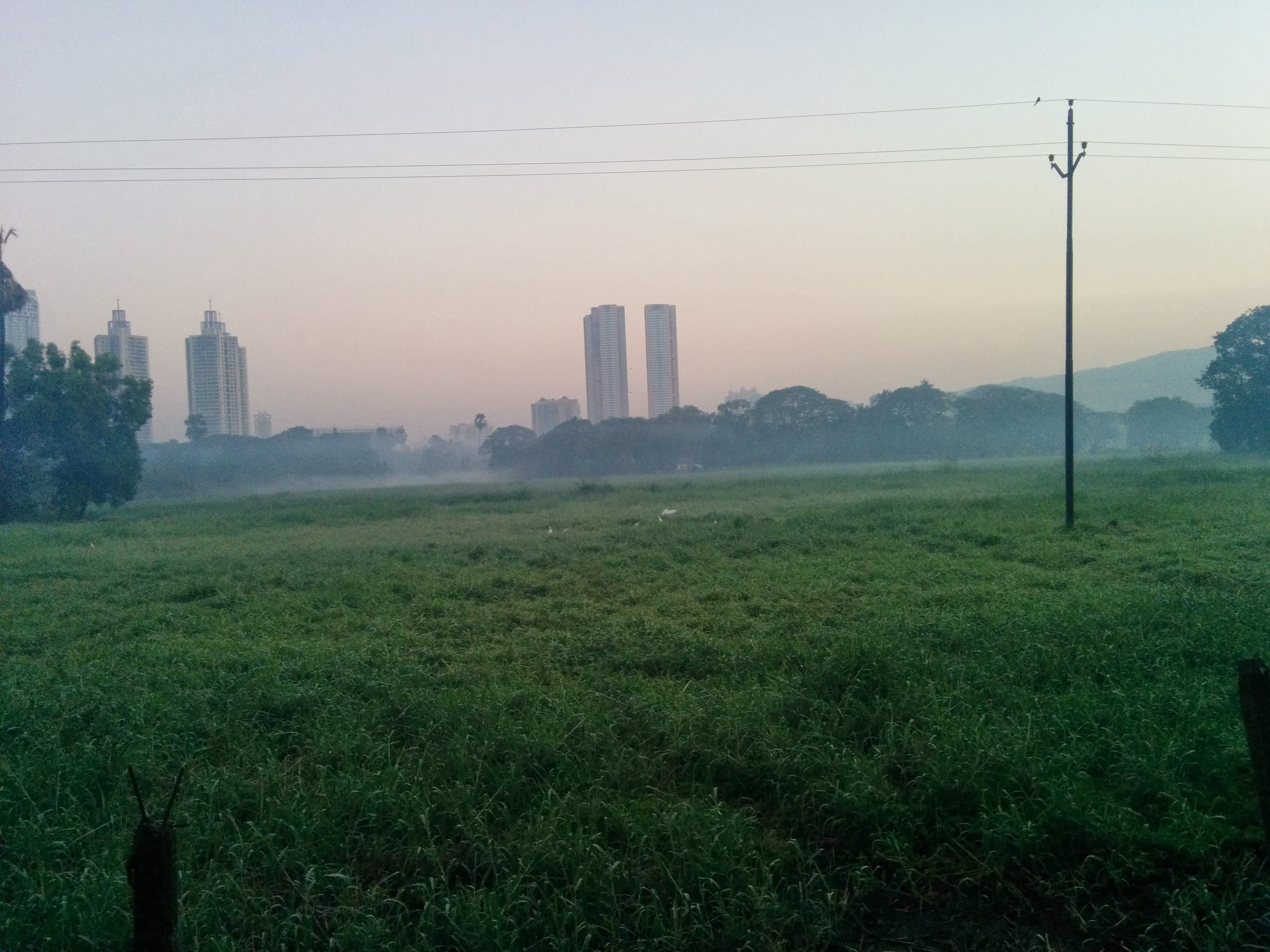
Grasses grown for use as animal feed

The Aarey Milk Colony occupies a total area of 3,166 acres (1,281 ha) of land, out of which the area available for cultivation of quality fodder and grasses is 400 acres (160 ha) only. Land is also leased out to various organizations and institutions of the Maharashtra State Government and Central Government of India. Allocation of land is as follows:

1. Total land given to the Central Government of India Institutions (Central Poultry Farm, Modern Bakery, NDDB, RBI)—229.92
2. Total land given to the Maharashtra State Government Institutions (Mumbai Veterinary College, SRP, MHADA, MCGB, Film City, Fishery)—729.12
3. Area under road and buildings—460.00
4. Area uncultivated and waste land under nullahs, lake, farm bunds, farm roads, river channels—1,020.20
5. Area under lawns and gardens, para grass, and orchards— 537.00
6. Land and the social forestry land, etc.—183.00
7. Total—3,160.00

The main objective to erect such colony:

1. Shifting of cattle/buffalo from the city limits,
2. Supply of better quality milk to the citizens of Mumbai at comparatively cheaper cost, and
3. Maintenance of these animals on scientific and modern animal husbandry practices.

In the colony, 30 stables are constructed having a capacity for housing 500–550 animals in each stables. Each stable has been provided with an ancillary building such as hay gawdown, chaff-cutting sheds, calving lines, and residential accommodation for the cattle owner and their staff. The private cattle owner who are maintaining their herds in the Mumbai city prior to 1949 were shifted and allotted licences to maintain their buffaloes in the colony stables. Presently, Aarey Milk Colony has got the capacity of accommodating 16,079 cattle in 30 units. The licence holders are required to pay the necessary license fee, occupation charges, water and electricity charges and other ancillary services rendered to them.

In addition to the activities of maintaining the large herds of milch animals in Aarey Colony, certain activities like running a primary school for the benefit of children of residents of the Aarey Colony and running a twenty-four bed hospital are also undertaken by Aarey authorities.

Animal Husbandry Scheme, Cow Unit Scheme

Under this scheme, nearly 1,700 indigenous and cross-breed cows are maintained at four Dairy Farms Units. The indigenous herd is utilized for producing large numbers of cross-breed heifers which are supplied to the farmers of dairy co-operatives in Maharashtra state to augment the milk production and the generation of cross-breed herd will be utilized to study the effect of cross-breeding up to a 7.5% and 6.5% exotic blood level. This study will be useful to advise the farmers in the Maharashtra state regarding the breeding policies that can be practiced by them for breeding their cross-bred progeny at the village level. Maintenance of cross-breed herds will be economic while the indigenous herds will be showing some amount of losses, but it will be a good study for future planning.

In order to increase the revenue and decrease the losses incurred, the following activities were initiated from 2001 to 2002.

1. The toll tax collection for the vehicles using the Aarey Forestmain road from Powai, Malad-Borivali, Dindoshi, Goregaon, Andheri, Marol-Maroshi by calling for public tenders.
2. The Aarey tank measuring 3–4 acres is utilized for boating purposes on a fixed rent basis.
3. The unutilized godowns which were earlier used for storing the fodder and concentrated animal feed are rented to various parties by calling for public tenders.
4. Various stalls open spoken were allotted for vendors' stalls, restaurants, general stores on a rental basis.
5. The agricultural produce from the various trees. E.g. Coconuts, mangoes, cashews, and palmyra fruit, etc. were given on a contractual basis.
6. The various resources and by-products. E.g. Water, fodder plot, and cattle are being sold on a contractual basis.

The various activities are carried out by the staff of around 640 personnel under the administrative control of chief executive officer Aarey Colony.

== Issues ==
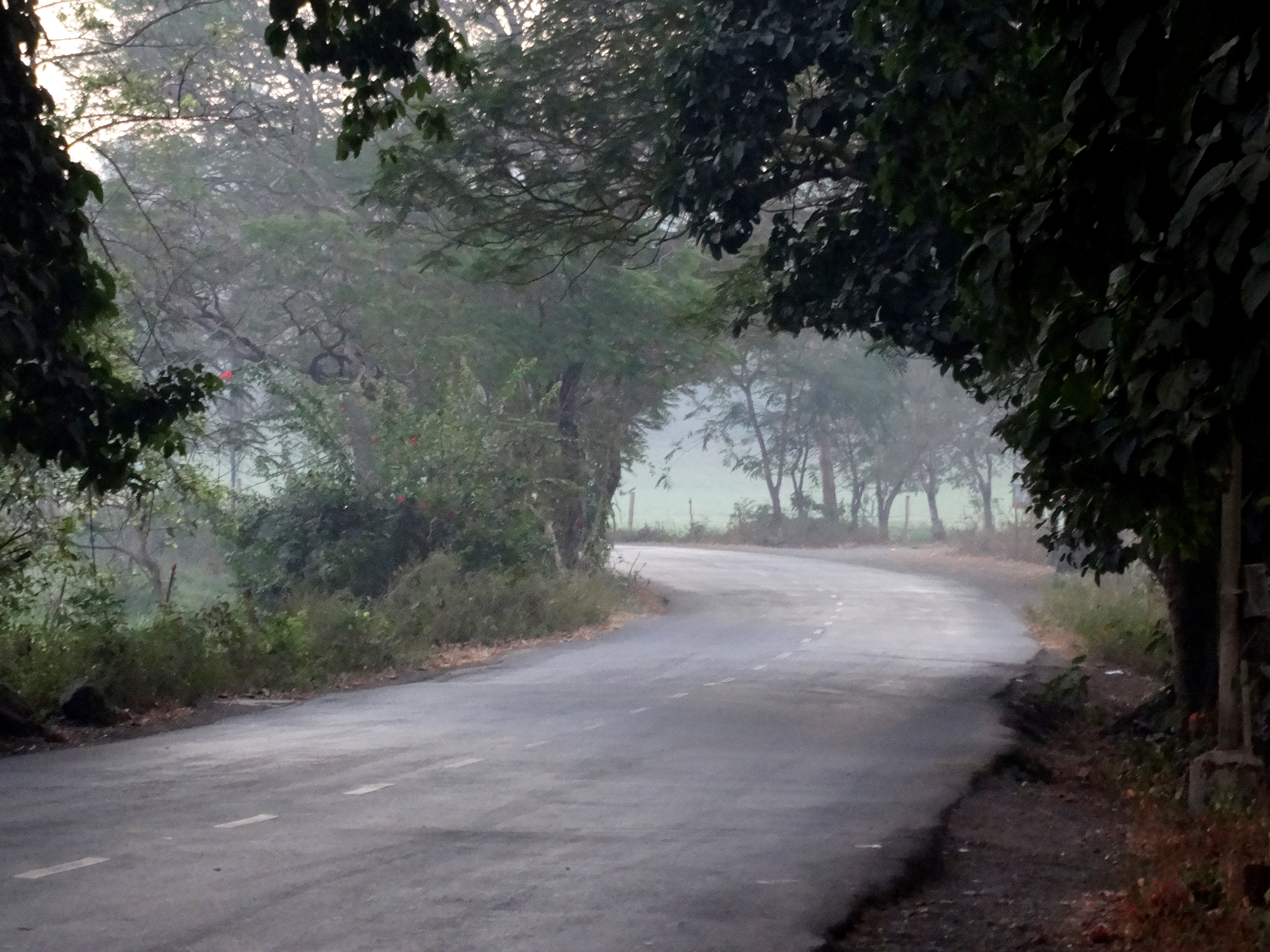
The roads within Aarey are sparsely traveled.

The roads within Aarey are sparsely traveled and late night travel must be avoided between 10 p.m. and 7 a.m. The thick vegetation hides wild animals like leopards, who usually prey upon stray dogs and feral pigs. In recent years, increased human encroachment into leopard territory and shortage of prey density in the neighbouring SGNP have turned some leopards into man-eaters. On 22 December 2016, the headless body of a 22-year-old man, Brandon Gonsalves, was found near Unit 2 of Aarey Colony. The Mumbai Police suspected that it was a case of human sacrifice performed by some tantrik babas. Apart from criminal activities like murders, road robberies, and occult practices, there are apocryphal tales of ghosts trying to hitch rides.

== In popular culture ==
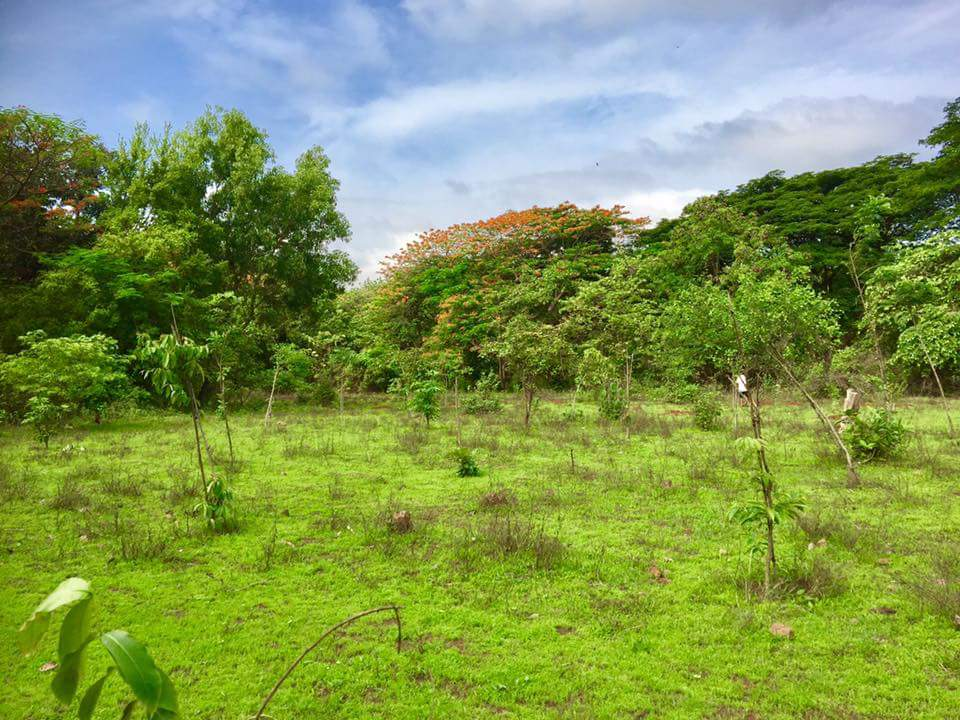
The picturesque beauty of Aarey has made it popular with filmmakers.

A large portion of Bimal Roy's Madhumati (1958) was shot in the area, to match the earlier footage shot in Nainital.

== Controversies ==
=== Construction projects in the forest ===
Mumbai Metro Rail Corporation, a Joint Venture Special Purpose Agency between the Government of India and the Government of Maharashtra for constructing Mumbai Metro Line 3 has proposed some projects which could have potentially caused several trees to be cut. Among which was the Metro Bhavan, a housing project for workers of the metro line within what was allegedly an eco sensitive part of the forest. The 32 story project 32-story residential project intended to house 8,000 people and also included a heliport and parking for 365 cars. This project has since been shifted to Dahisar.

Proponents say the land is needed for projects that are important to local residents, and that the need outweighs environmental concerns raised by people who want to protect the forest. From 2014 onwards a coalition of urban and Indigenous communities has campaigned against any clearing of the area. The car shed project was tried to be moved to Kanjurmarg. But later in July 2022 the project was shifted back to its original place and the construction resumed when the stay order was removed on 21 July. However, the work did not restart until March 2023 as hearing on several different petitions filed against the construction of metro depot in Aarey were still being heard in the Bombay High Court and the Indian Supreme Court. The last of which only concluded in early 2023. It has been said that the carshed issue resulted in delaying the opening of the Metro Line 3 by at least five years and also lead to cost overruns in thousands of crores in rupees.

Those who want to protect Aarey Forest say the loss to the forest of thousands of trees will lead to poorer air quality and will disrupt wildlife habitat, including that of a small population of endangered leopards. They say the housing project, which has a large concrete footprint, will lead to flooding in an urban area already prone to seasonal floods.
