= Hajji Bekandeh-ye Khoshk-e Bijar Rural District =

Rural district in Gilan province, Iran

Hajji Bekandeh-ye Khoshk-e Bijar Rural District Persian: دهستان حاجی‌بکنده خشکبیجار
- Rural District
- Location within Iran
- Coordinates: 37°25′N 49°46′E
- Country: Iran
- Province: Gilan
- County: Rasht
- District: Khoshk-e Bijar
- Established: 1987
- Capital: Hajji Bekandeh

Population (2016)
  - Total: 9,282
- Time zone: UTC+3:30 (IRST)

Hajji Bekandeh-ye Khoshk-e Bijar Rural District (Persian: دهستان حاجی‌بکنده خشکبیجار) is in Khoshk-e Bijar District of Rasht County, Gilan province, Iran. Its capital is the village of Hajji Bekandeh.

== Demographics ==
=== Population ===
At the time of the 2006 National Census, the rural district's population was 9,973 in 2,928 households. There were 9,793 inhabitants in 3,227 households at the following census of 2011. The 2016 census measured the population of the rural district as 9,282 in 3,330 households. The most populous of its 16 villages was Jirkuyeh, with 1,103 people.

=== Other villages in the rural district ===
- Aminabad
- Amir Bekandeh
- Bagh-e Amir Bekandeh
- Balaskaleh-ye Emam Jomeh
- Chapar Pord
- Chapar Pord-e Zaman
- Chukadeh
- Gileva Mahalleh
- Pir Ali Deh
- Sar Khoshki
- Shahrestan
- Siah Estalakh-e Saqad ol Molk
- Talesh Mahalleh
- Tazehabad
