= Vio (surname) =

Vio is a surname. Notable people with the surname include:

- Beatrice Vio (born 1997), Italian fencer
- Betty Vio (c. 1808–1872), Italian–German opera singer
- Romano Vio (1913–1984), Italian sculptor
- Tomás Vio (1921–2001), Argentine basketball player
- Fabio Vio (born 1949), Chilean diplomat

== See also ==
- Vio (disambiguation)
