= Nosher =

Nosher or Noshir may refer to:

- Nosher Powell, English actor and boxer
- Gunner "Nosher" Evans, a character in the It Ain't Half Hot Mum comedy series
- Noshir Contractor, Indian-American computer scientist
- Noshir Gowadia, Indian-American spy
- Noshir H. Antia, Indian plastic surgeon
- Noshir M. Shroff, Indian ophthalmologist
- Noshir Mehta, Indian cricketer

== See also ==
- Nosh (disambiguation)
- Nowshar (disambiguation)
- Nowshera (disambiguation)
- Nosherwan (disambiguation)
- Anushirvan (disambiguation)
