= Nowsher, Rasht =

Village in Gilan province, Iran

Nowsher Persian: نوشر
- Village
- Location within Iran
- Coordinates: 37°21′55″N 49°46′43″E
- Country: Iran
- Province: Gilan
- County: Rasht
- District: Khoshk-e Bijar
- Rural District: Nowsher-e Khoshk-e Bijar

Population (2016)
  - Total: 773
- Time zone: UTC+3:30 (IRST)

Nowsher (Persian: نوشر) (Note: Also known as Nowshahr) is a village in, and the capital of, Nowsher-e Khoshk-e Bijar Rural District in Khoshk-e Bijar District of Rasht County, Gilan province, Iran.

== Demographics ==
=== Population ===
At the time of the 2006 National Census, the village's population was 833 in 249 households. The following census in 2011 counted 858 people in 270 households. The 2016 census measured the population of the village as 773 people in 273 households.
