= Herbert Mills Birdwood =

Anglo-Indian judge and administrator

Herbert Birdwood CSI
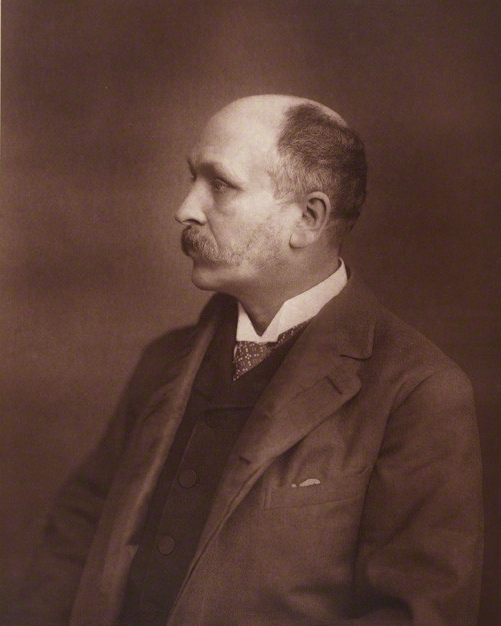
- Born: 29 May 1837; Belgaum, British India
- Died: 21 February 1907 (aged 69); Twickenham, Surrey, England
- Burial place: Twickenham Cemetery
- Education: Mount Radford School
- Alma mater: Peterhouse, Cambridge
- Occupation: British colonial governor

Herbert Mills Birdwood CSI (29 May 1837 – 21 February 1907) was an Anglo-Indian judge and administrator. He was the acting governor of Bombay from 16 February 1895 to 18 February 1895. He was also a naturalist and botanist who documented the flora of the Matheran region and headed the botanical section of the Bombay Natural History Society.

== Early life ==
Birdwood was born on 29 May 1837 in Belgaum, India, the third son of and Lydia (née Taylor) and General Christopher Birdwood (1807–1882) and educated at Mount Radford School, Exeter, the University of Edinburgh (where he distinguished himself in mathematics) and at Peterhouse, Cambridge. He was a Bye-Fellow of Peterhouse, and gained the degree (LLD). He was 23rd wrangler in the mathematical tripos and a second class in the natural science tripos. In October 1901 he was elected an Honorary Fellow of Peterhouse.

== Career ==
Birdwood was eighteenth in the Indian civil service examination in 1858 to enter the Haileybury, the training college for the Indian Civil Service. He completed his MA in 1861, LLM in 1878, LLD in 1889. He reached Bombay on 26 January 1859 and served in the Bombay Presidency as assistant collector. In 1863 he was under-secretary to the Bombay legislative council and in 1866 he went as a political assistant at Kathawar. He was appointed judge at Ratnagiri in 1871 and then moved to Thana and Surat. He established a reputation of independence by questioning the government and the legality of its revenue surveys. In 1881 he became Judicial Commissioner and Judge of the Sadar Court in Sind. He was an acting Judge of the Bombay High Court, in 1885 he was granted a permanent position which he held until being appointed Judicial Member of the Bombay Government in 1892. During his Sind tenure, he also worked on improvements to the Karachi public gardens and helped establish a zoo there.

He served from 1885 to 1892 in Bombay as judge and from 1892 to 1897 as judicial and political member of the Bombay council. During this period he also immersed himself in educational and scientific pursuits. Birdwood became a vice-chancellor of the University of Bombay from 1891 to 1892. He was a member of the Council of the Governor of Bombay, and briefly acted as governor in 1895. From 1894 to 1895 he also served as president of Bombay Branch of the Royal Asiatic Society. Birdwood took an interest in the study of plants and natural history. Birdwood was a president of the botanical department of the Bombay Natural History Society and published a catalogue of the plants of Matheran along with the pioneering Indian botanist Jayakrishna Indraji. He published a book on the Indian Timbers (1910). He was also president of the Agri-Horticultural Society of Western India. His older brother George was an economic botanist. He studied the history of the plague in western India.

Birdwood worked with Justice Wood Renton and E. G. Phillimore to revise of Burge's Commentaries on Colonial and Foreign Laws (1907).

== Personal life ==
Birdwood married Edith Marion Sidonie Impey, the daughter of Sergeant-Major Elijah George Halhed Impey, on 29 January 1861. They had six children, including Halhed Brodrick Birdwood, who eventually held the rank of brigadier general in the British military and William Birdwood, 1st Baron Birdwood, who held the rank of field marshal.

He died at his home Dalkeith House, Twickenham, from pneumonia on 21 February 1907 and is buried at Twickenham cemetery.
