= Nowshar =

Nowshar or Nowsher (Persian: نوشر), also rendered as Noshar, may refer to:

- Nowshar, Astaneh-ye Ashrafiyeh
- Nowshar, Lahijan
- Nowsher, Rasht
- Nowsher-e Koshk-e Bijar Rural District, in Rasht County

== See also ==
- Nosher (disambiguation)
- Nowshahr (disambiguation)
- Naushir Mehta, Indian cricketer
