= Khoshk-e Bijar =

City in Gilan province, Iran

Khoshk-e Bijar Persian: خشکبیجار
- City
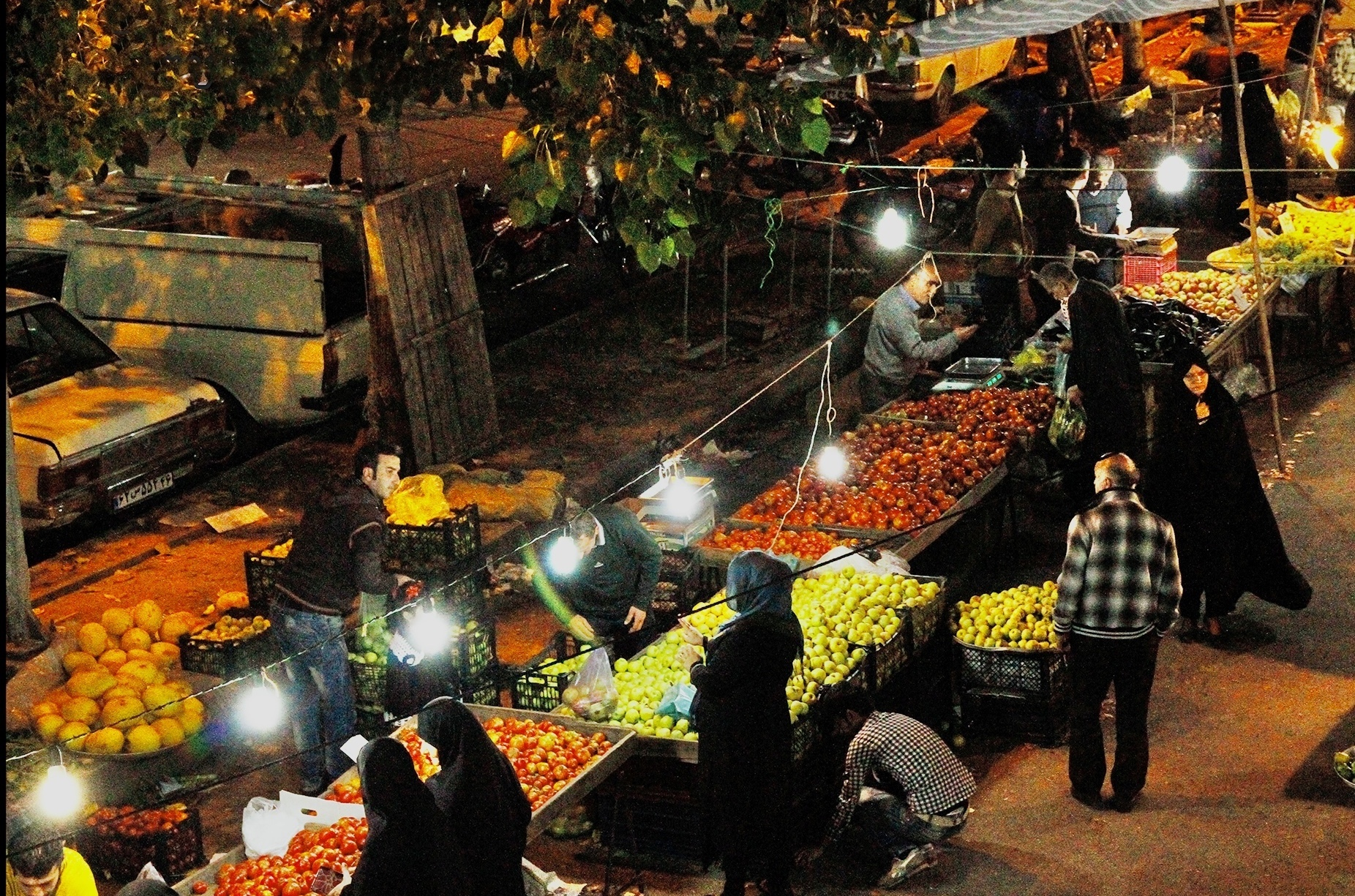
- The bazaar of Khoshk-e Bijar

- Location within Iran
- Coordinates: 37°22′23″N 49°45′28″E
- Country: Iran
- Province: Gilan
- County: Rasht
- District: Khoshk-e Bijar
- Elevation: −14 m (−46 ft)

Population (2016)
  - Total: 7,245
- Time zone: UTC+3:30 (IRST)
- Website: www.khoshkebijar.ir

Khoshk-e Bijar (Persian: خشکبیجار) (Note: Also romanized as Khushk-e Bejār; Gilaki: خۊشكبجار) is a city in, and the capital of, Khoshk-e Bijar District of Rasht County, Gilan province, Iran.

The city is located on a plain and has a temperate and humid climate. It is located 8 km (5.0 mi) west of Lasht-e Nesha and 26 km (16 mi) northeast of Rasht. There are four rivers in the area: Gisheh damardeh, Nureh, Khoshkebijari and Bazari.

== History ==
In 1944, Khoshk-e Bijar Rural District was established, and in 1961 the village was converted to a city. The rural district became the separate Khoshk-e Bijar District in 1995.

== Demographics ==
People of Khoshk-e Bijar speak Gilaki and Persian languages. People are mainly involved in agriculture, gardening, animal husbandry, beekeeping, fish farming, and mat weaving.

=== Population ===
At the time of the 2006 National Census, the city's population was 7,478 in 2,186 households. The following census in 2011 counted 7,133 people in 2,315 households. The 2016 census measured the population of the city as 7,245 people in 2,470 households.
