= Film City, Mumbai =

Film studio complex in Mumbai, India

Coordinates: 19.1611°N 72.887351°E

Dadasaheb Phalke Chitranagari
- Type: Government held company
- Industry: Film industry
- Founded: 1977; 49 years ago
- Headquarters: Goregaon East, Mumbai, Maharashtra, India
- Area served: 520 acres
- Key people: Sudhir Mungantiwar, Chairman of MFSCDC
- Owner: Government of Maharashtra
- Parent: Maharashtra Film, Stage & Cultural Development Corporation (MFSCDC)
- Website: www.filmcitymumbai.org

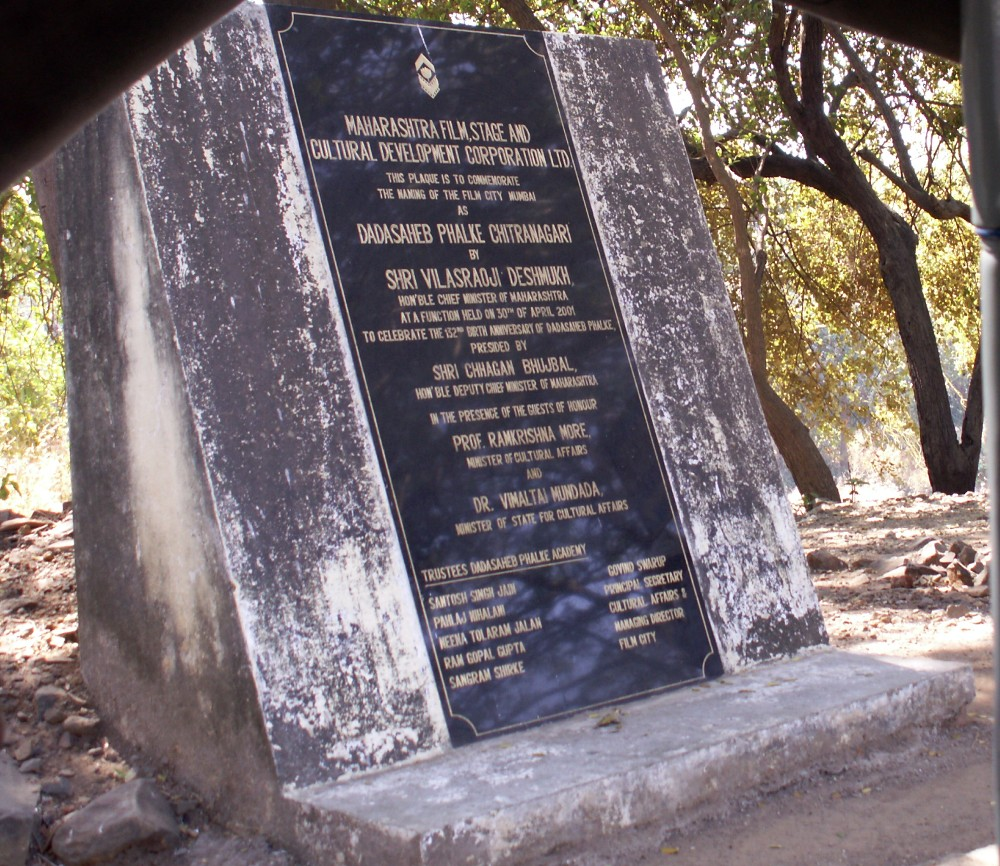
Plaque at Film City entrance

Film City, officially known as Dadasaheb Phalke Chitranagari, is an integrated film studio complex located in Goregaon East, Mumbai. Established in 1977 by the Maharashtra State Government, it was created to provide facilities and concessions to the film industry. The project was planned and executed under the guidance of filmmaker V. Shantaram. In 2001, it was renamed in honour of Dadasaheb Phalke, who is regarded as the father of Indian cinema.

Spanning over 520 acres, Film City includes 42 outdoor shooting locations and 16 sound stages. It features diverse settings, including permanent sets for temples, prisons, courts, villages, gardens, and picnic spots, as well as man-made waterfalls, lakes, and mountains. The facility has been a prominent shooting location for numerous Hindi and Marathi films.

== History ==
Film City was established on September 26, 1977, by the Department of Cultural Affairs, Government of Maharashtra. Its creation was driven by the efforts of V. Shantaram, B. R. Chopra, and Dilip Kumar, who advocated for a dedicated facility to support the film industry.

In 2001, Film City was renamed the Dadasaheb Phalke Chitranagari in honour of Dadasaheb Phalke, regarded as the founder of the Indian film industry.

== Location ==
Film City is located in the Goregaon East neighborhood of Mumbai, adjacent to the Aarey Colony and Sanjay Gandhi National Park. The complex is surrounded by forested areas that are part of the national park, which serves as a habitat for wildlife, including leopards. Leopard sightings are common in the vicinity, and there have been occasional reports of leopard attacks on humans. The boundary between Film City and Sanjay Gandhi National Park is not clearly defined, and there have been allegations of fraudulent land sales involving the Aarey Colony and the national park.

Approximately 800 people work across the studio's eight filming locations on an average day.

== Services ==
In 2014, the Maharashtra Tourism Development Corporation (MTDC) introduced guided tours of the Film City to promote tourism. These tours offer visitors insights into the studio's operations and filming locations, with tickets priced at approximately ₹650.

== See also ==
- Noida Film City
- Ramoji Film City, Hyderabad
- Cinema of India
- Film and Television Institute of India, Pune
- State Institute of Film and Television
