= Kuri Jan, Gilan =

Kuri Jan كوريجان
- Village
- Location within Iran
- Coordinates: 37°20′06″N 49°46′50″E
- Country: Iran
- Province: Gilan
- County: Rasht
- Bakhsh: Khoshk-e Bijar
- Rural District: Nowsher-e Koshk-e Bijar

Population (2006)
  - Total: 124
- Time zone: UTC+3:30 (IRST)

Kuri Jan (Persian: كوريجان, also Romanized as Kūrī Jān) is a village in Nowsher-e Koshk-e Bijar Rural District, Khoshk-e Bijar District, Rasht County, Gilan Province, Iran. At the 2016 census, its population was 123, in 45 families.
