= VIOS =

VIOS may refer to:

- Voice I/O System, Digital Research Access Manager for Concurrent DOS
- ViOS, Visual Internet Operating System
- Toyota Vios, a subcompact automobile

== See also ==
- Vio (disambiguation)
