= Vio (Indian drink) =

Flavoured milk product sold by the Coca-Cola Company in India

VIO (Flavoured Milk)
- Type: Flavoured Milk
- Manufacturer: Coca-Cola India
- Origin: India
- Introduced: 2016
- Ingredients: Toned Milk, Milk Solids, Sugar, Contains Permitted Synthetic Food Colors (102) & Added Saffron and Pistachio Flavours. (Nature-Identical Flavouring Substances)
- Website: www.coca-colacompany.com/stories/coca-cola-india-enters-dairy-market-with-vio-flavored-milk

Vio is a flavoured milk sold in India by Coca-Cola India. There are two variants - VIO Almond Delight and VIO Kesar Treat. The milk is sourced from dairy farmers and blended with flavours.

VIO flavoured milk contains toned milk, milk solids, sugar, blended with saffron, pistachio, and almond flavours in the respective ‘Kesar Treat’ and ‘Almond Delight’ variants. Each pack contains 6.4 g of protein. It has no added preservatives. It is available in 200 ml Aseptic Tetra packaging.

It is currently being manufactured by a co-packer, Schreiber Dynamix Dairies Pvt. Ltd.

== See also ==
- Vio
