= Vio (American drink) =

Drink brand by the Coca-Cola Company

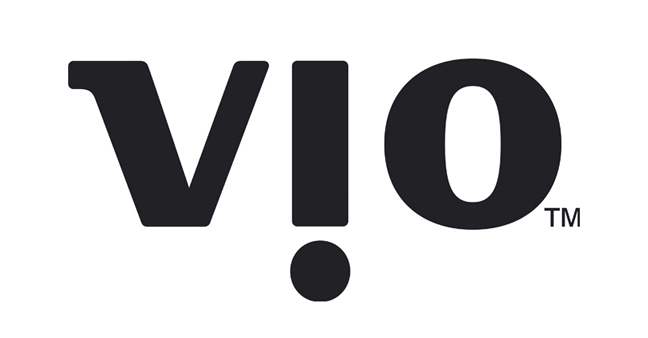
- Type: Milk
- Manufacturer: The Coca-Cola Company
- Origin: United States
- Introduced: 2009
- Colour: White

Vio is a beverage produced by the Coca-Cola Company consisting of milk with flavored carbonated water. The flavors are Citrus Burst, Peach Mango, Very Berry, and Tropical Colada.

The drink was tested on the American market in 2009, however it failed to find broad appeal. It was still being produced in limited quantities up until 2010. In 2016, Coca-Cola India launched a non-carbonated flavored milk product also named Vio. The Coca-Cola Company sells a similar product in Japan called Qoo.

Time magazine included Vio in its 50 Worst Inventions list published in 2010 and in its Top 10 Bad Beverage Ideas list.

== Relaunch ==
In 2020, The Coca-Cola Company launched regional beverage Spiced Buttermilk under its VIO brand in India.
