= Nowsher-e Khoshk-e Bijar Rural District =

Rural district in Gilan province, Iran

Nowsher-e Khoshk-e Bijar Rural District Persian: دهستان نوشر خشکبیجار
- Rural District
- Location within Iran
- Coordinates: 37°22′N 49°46′E
- Country: Iran
- Province: Gilan
- County: Rasht
- District: Khoshk-e Bijar
- Established: 1987
- Capital: Nowsher

Population (2016)
  - Total: 9,575
- Time zone: UTC+3:30 (IRST)

Nowsher-e Khoshk-e Bijar Rural District (Persian: دهستان نوشر خشکبیجار) is in Khoshk-e Bijar District of Rasht County, Gilan province, Iran. Its capital is the village of Nowsher.

== Demographics ==
=== Population ===
At the time of the 2006 National Census, the rural district's population was 10,600 in 3,033 households. There were 10,323 inhabitants in 3,339 households at the following census of 2011. The 2016 census measured the population of the rural district as 9,575 in 3,339 households. The most populous of its 21 villages was Tamal, with 1,508 people.

=== Other villages in the rural district ===
- Alman
- Baghcheh Boneh
- Baleskeleh-ye Seyyed Abu ol Qasem
- Basteh Deym
- Forshom
- Gol Bazu
- Jirsar-e Vishka
- Jurkuyeh
- Kuri Jan
- Mashal Alam
- Moridan
- Neysa Chah
- Rofuh Chah
- Rud Posht
- Shisheh Gurab
- Siah Estalakh-e Mirza Rabi
- Vishka
- Yusef Mahalleh
- Yusefabad
