= Nowshahr-e Kalangi =

Nowshahr-e Kalangi نوشهركلنگي
- Village
- Country: Iran
- Province: Hormozgan
- County: Minab
- Bakhsh: Byaban
- Rural District: Sirik

Population (2006)
  - Total: 333
- Time zone: UTC+3:30 (IRST)
  - Summer (DST): UTC+4:30 (IRDT)

Nowshahr-e Kalangi (Persian: نوشهركلنگي, also Romanized as Nowshahr-e Kalangī) is a village in Sirik Rural District, Byaban District, Minab County, Hormozgan Province, Iran. At the 2006 census, its population was 333, in 50 families.
