= Nowshiravan, Kermanshah =

Nowshiravan نوشيروان
- Village
- Location within Iran
- Coordinates: 34°35′08″N 45°50′19″E
- Country: Iran
- Province: Kermanshah
- County: Sarpol-e Zahab
- Bakhsh: Central
- Rural District: Dasht-e Zahab

Population (2006)
  - Total: 194
- Time zone: UTC+3:30 (IRST)
  - Summer (DST): UTC+4:30 (IRDT)

Nowshiravan (Persian: نوشيروان, also Romanized as Nowshīravān; also known as Anūshīrvān, Tappeh-ye Nowshīravān, and Tepe Naushīrvān) is a village in Dasht-e Zahab Rural District, in the Central District of Sarpol-e Zahab County, Kermanshah Province, Iran. At the 2006 census, its population was 194, in 36 families.
