= Deh-e Anushirvan =

Deh-e Anushirvan ده انوشيروان
- Village
- Location within Iran
- Coordinates: 31°06′18″N 61°46′02″E
- Country: Iran
- Province: Sistan and Baluchestan
- County: Hirmand
- Bakhsh: Central
- Rural District: Dust Mohammad

Population (2006)
  - Total: 243
- Time zone: UTC+3:30 (IRST)
  - Summer (DST): UTC+4:30 (IRDT)

Deh-e Anushirvan (Persian: ده انوشيروان, also Romanized as Deh-e Anūshīrvān; also known as Anūshīrvān) is a village in Dust Mohammad Rural District, in the Central District of Hirmand County, Sistan and Baluchestan Province, Iran. At the 2006 census, its population was 243, in 48 families.
