= Nowshahr-e Surgi =

Nowshahr-e Surgi نوشهر سورگي
- Village
- Country: Iran
- Province: Hormozgan
- County: Minab
- Bakhsh: Byaban
- Rural District: Byaban

Population (2006)
  - Total: 67
- Time zone: UTC+3:30 (IRST)
  - Summer (DST): UTC+4:30 (IRDT)

Nowshahr-e Surgi (Persian: نوشهر سورگي, also Romanized as Nowshahr-e Sūrgī) is a village in Byaban Rural District, Byaban District, Minab County, Hormozgan Province, Iran. According to the 2006 census, its population was 67, with 9 families.
