= Dara Nusserwanji Khurody =

Indian entrepreneur (1906–1983)

- Born: 2 January 1906; Mhow, British India
- Died: 30 March 1983 (aged 77); Madhya Pradesh, India
- Occupation: Civil servant
- Known for: Aarey Forest; Toned milk
- Awards: Ramon Magsaysay Award; Padma Bhushan

Dara Nusserwanji Khurody (2 January 1906 – 1 January 1983) was an Indian entrepreneur known for his contributions to the dairy industry of India. He worked in various private and government organization at the start of his career and also held government official positions later on. He was the Milk Commissioner of Bombay (now Mumbai) from 1946 to 1952. His name was considered "synonymous with dairying" in India in the 1950s. He received the Ramon Magsaysay Award jointly with Verghese Kurien and Tribhuvandas Kishibhai Patel in 1963 and the Padma Bhushan from the Government of India in 1964.

== Biography and works ==
Dara Khurody was born on 2 January 1906 in Mhow town of now Madhya Pradesh state of India. His father and grandfather were both employees in government and his family wished he be one too. His interest in dairy developed in childhood while he assisted his uncle who supplied dairy products to the military establishments in Mhow. Thereupon he took admission in the Imperial Institute of Animal Husbandry at Bangalore (now National Dairy Research Institute) in 1923. He received training at the Government Creamery at Anand, Gujarat and in 1925 received gold medal from the government for proclaiming the first position in the All India Dairy Diploma Examination. For the next ten years he worked as the dairy farm superintendent at Tata Iron & Steel Co. at Jamshedpur. During this tenure he visited Denmark and the Netherlands for various trainings.

On his family's persistence, Khurody joined the Agricultural Marketing Department of the government in 1935. In this newly formed department he worked as the marketing officer for the dairy and animal husbandry products. During this tenure, he was an active member in formalizing the Agmark grading system. He wrote various reports on milk marketing in India and Burma and his 1941 report is considered an important work in the field. This report conceived the preliminary idea of the Aarey Forest of Mumbai. In this report he also proposed the concept of toned milk.

Produced by mixing natural buffalo milk with water and skimmed milk powder, toned milk maintained the nutritious quality while reducing the cost considerably. He proposed that to meet the demand of the Indian market toned milk of 2 percent fat and double toned milk of 1 percent fat and 10 percent solids not-fat should be brought in market and promoted. On 13 February 1946, this theory of toned milk was brought into practice for the first time and introduced in Bombay region. Toned milk brought the buffalo-milk down to 3 percent fat. This fat was comparable with the cow-milk but at the same time was at half price of buffalo-milk making it affordable to general masses. The Bombay Government purchased this toned milk to cater to 40,000 school children. The product saw initial resistance in market but by 1975 market demand had increased above the production plant capacities.

Due to the World War II, demand for ghee in military establishments had increased. Khurody had joined the Government of Bombay State as the Deputy Milk Commissioner to serve the state which was still struggling to cope up with the pressures of subsidized milk supplies during the war period. He implemented a Safe Milk Policy and new laws which stipulated that commercial establishments like hotels should use only skimmed milk, which was imported and supplied by the government at an enhanced price. The Safe Milk Policy would, years later, be promoted by UNICEF in Europe. The profits generated by the sale of imported skimmed milk helped to accumulate a corpus that was put in use to establish a buffalo colony at Aarey, a suburb on the eastern side of Bombay, which came to be known as Aarey Milk Colony. Before that, he had undertaken a study of the Kaira Model where almost 80 percent of the total daily production of 400 MT of milk was being converted into ghee or skimmed milk. He arranged for the procurement of milk from Polson's Dairy in Anand in large quantities for supply in Bombay, under a scheme named as Bombay Milk Scheme. The Aarey Forest was established in 1949 and officially inaugurated by the then Prime Minister Jawaharlal Nehru in 1951. The Colony engaged modern technologies of milk processing, toning, sterilizing, large-scale cheese production and logistics. In 1953, UNICEF coordinated with Khurody, inspired by his Aarey Colony, on various other projects. The Colony at that time had about 15000 buffalos and was also a tourist spot for foreigners. As of 2015, the colony spread over 1,287 hectares (3,180 acres) with numerous cattle sheds where owners could entrust their buffaloes to be accommodated and tended to, at a nominal fee. UNICEF provided for technology and finances to develop the dairy industry in India. It financed US$ 1.5 million towards construction of dairy at Worli in Mumbai. In May 1963, Worli dairy was inaugurated after efforts of Khurody and UNICEF. The dairy was then the world's largest milk processing unit with a daily capacity of 300,000 litres (66,000 imp gal; 79,000 US gal).

== Family and personal life ==
Khurody married Persis and had two children. His son Nawshir Khurody graduated from Trinity College, Cambridge, and was managing director of Voltas and chairman of Tata Infomedia. Nawshir's daughter Khursheed Khurody studied Indology and South Asian Studies and Civilization at Harvard University and also acted in the 2005 Bollywood film Mr Prime Minister.

== Awards ==
In 1963, Khurody, along with Verghese Kurien and Tribhuvandas Kishibhai Patel was presented with the Ramon Magsaysay Award for "Community Leadership". In 1964, the Government of India honoured Khurody and Patel with the Padma Bhushan, the third highest civilian honour of the country.
