= NOSH-aspirin =

Group of aspirin hybrides

Chemical structure of NOSH-Aspirin, with highlighted acetylsalicylic acid (green), sulfide-releasing (yellow), and nitric oxide-releasing (blue) groups.

NOSH-Aspirin is a category of new hybrids of acetylsalicylic acid, bearing both nitric oxide (NO)- and hydrogen sulfide (H_{2}S)- releasing areas. Preliminary studies have found that four NOSH variants, evaluated in eleven different human cancer cell lines, were effective in inhibiting the growth of these cell lines. NOSH-1 was also devoid of any cellular toxicity, and was comparable to aspirin in its anti-inflammatory properties.
