= Nowshar, Lahijan =

Nowshar نوشر
- Village
- Location within Iran
- Coordinates: 37°18′00″N 50°08′00″E
- Country: Iran
- Province: Gilan
- County: Lahijan
- Bakhsh: Rudboneh
- Rural District: Shirju Posht

Population (2006)
  - Total: 552
- Time zone: UTC+3:30 (IRST)
  - Summer (DST): UTC+4:30 (IRDT)

Nowshar (Persian: نوشر) is a village in Shirju Posht Rural District, Rudboneh District, Lahijan County, Gilan Province, Iran. At the 2006 census, its population was 552, in 175 families.
