= Toned milk =

Type of buffalo milk

Toned milk is a method, developed in India, of treating buffalo milk by adding skim milk, powdered skim milk and water to it. This process decreases the fat content, increases the quantity of available milk, and 'tones up' the non-fat solids level to the original amount. The cost of milk is reduced, making it more widely available and not a luxury purchase.

Toned milk is often used in areas where milk production is extremely low or demand is very high compared to the available capacity. In these cases, untreated milk tends to be high in fat, and mechanical removal of the milk-fat would be cost-prohibitive.

Buffalo milk has a fat content of about 7-8%, and contains calcium and a non-fat solids content of 9-10%. By reducing the fat content to 3% through the toning process, the available milk quantity is nearly tripled.

== Double-toned milk ==
Double-toned milk is a similar product, where the fat content of the milk is reduced to 1.5% and the non-fat solids content increased to 9%. This product is produced by UNICEF for free distribution to homeless youth and low-income families in India. Unlike single toned milk, double-toned milk is always pasteurized.

== Standard milk ==
The Food Safety and Standards Authority of India (FSSAI) has also defined standard milk—milk which has a minimum fat percentage of 4.5—higher than cow's milk or toned buffalo milk's 3.5% but lower than full cream buffalo milk (6.5%). This makes the milk balanced in fat/cream content.
