= Yazdi Karanjia =

Indian theatre actor

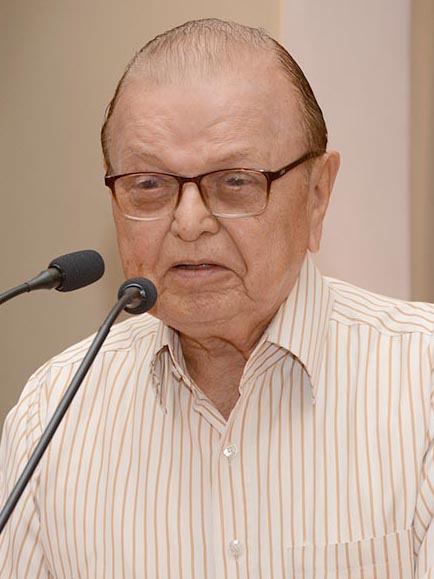
- Karanjia at Gujarati Vishwakosh, September 2018
- Born: 3 March 1932 (age 94); Valsad, Surat, Gujarat
- Occupation: Theatre actor
- Children: 3
- Awards: Padma Shri (2021)

Yazdi Naoshriwan Karanjia (born 3 March 1932, Valsad) is a Gujarati theatre person from India. He is based in Surat and widely noted as one of the doyens of Parsi theatre.

== Career ==
For more than 60 years, his troupe has performed comedy plays. With Chandravadan Mehta, he has created Tapitate Tapidas, a comedy radio series on Akashvani, which ran for more than 400 episodes. Later it was also published as a book. Some of his popular comedy plays include Bicharo Barjor, Dinshajina Dabba Gul and Kutarani Punchhadi Vanki. He rans Cambay Institute of Commerce, a coaching institute.

In January 2020, he was awarded with the Padma Shri, the fourth highest civilian award of India, for his services in the field of the arts.

== Personal life ==
He married Vira in 1961; they have 3 children.
