= Noshirvan Nagarwala =

Indian cricket umpire (1909–1998)

Personal information
- Full name: Noshirvan Dorabji Nagarwala
- Born: 10 October 1909; Ahmednagar, India
- Died: 10 September 1998 (aged 88); Pune, India

Umpiring information
- Tests umpired: 5 (1952–1960)
- Source: ESPNcricinfo, 13 July 2013

Noshirvan Nagarwala (10 October 1909 – 10 September 1998) was an Indian cricket umpire. He stood in five Test matches between 1952 and 1960.

In the 1930s, Nagarwala appeared in 11 first-class matches as a player, with Maharashtra, Parsees and Dr HD Kanga's Parsees XI.

== See also ==
- List of Test cricket umpires
