= Rustomjee Naserwanjee Khory =

Indian physician

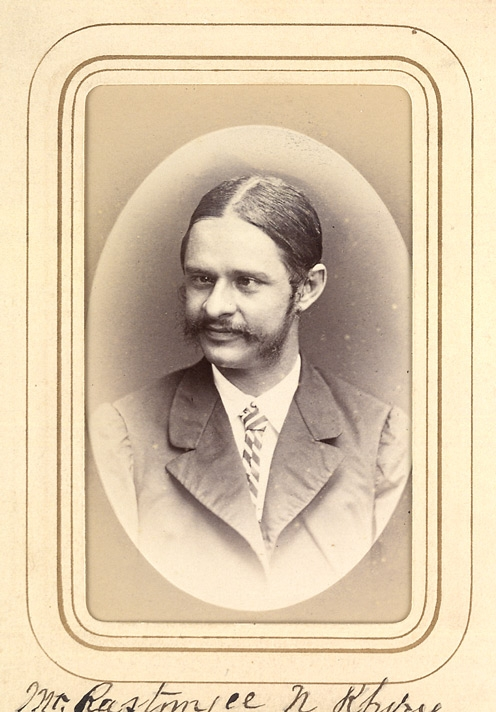
Carte de visite of Dr Khory

Rustomjee Naserwanjee Khory (1839- 29 December 1904) was an Indian physician and writer who practiced in Bombay and later lived in London. He compiled a two volume work on medicine and a compilation on the medicinal plants of western India and traditional treatments.

Khory came from a Parsi family in Bombay and studied medicine at the Grant Medical College, Bombay in 1864 before he obtained a diploma of the LRCP, London in 1870 and graduated MD from Brussels. He studied the medicinal plants of western India and published the Bombay Materia Medica and Therapeutics in 1887. A second edition was produced with N.N. Katrak in 1903. He was an honorary physician at the Jamsetjee Jeejeebhoy Hospital.

He died at his home in Surat House, Loudoun Road, St Johns Wood and was buried at the Parsee cemetery at Brookwood.

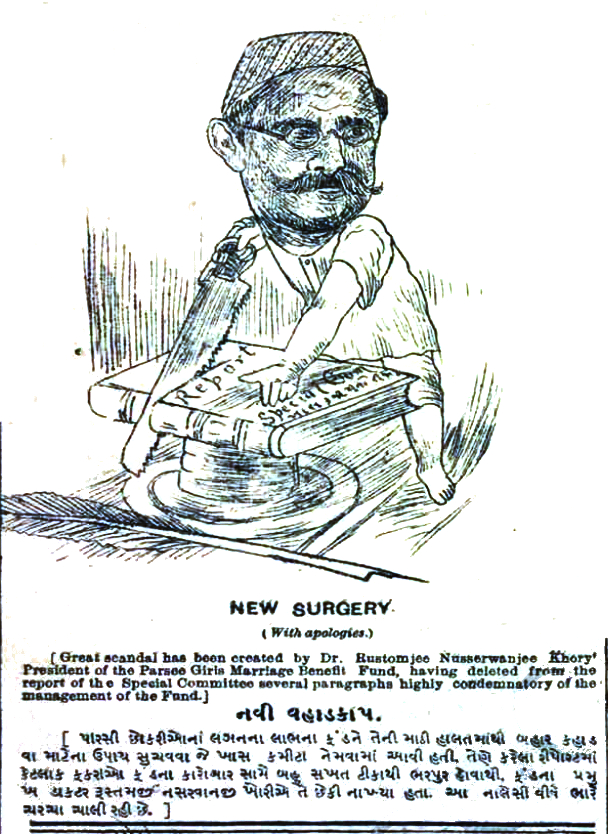

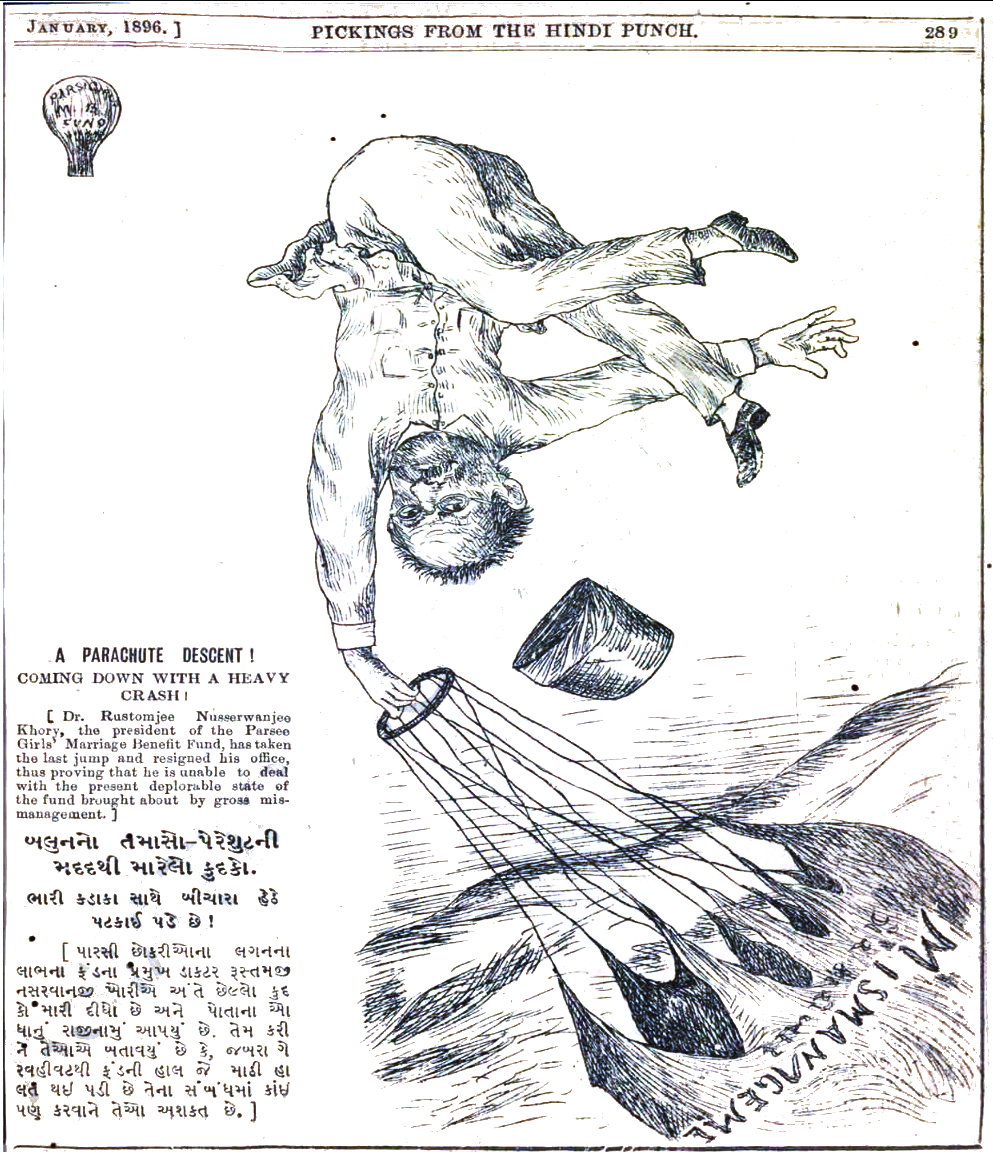
