= Khoshk-e Bijar District =

District in Gilan province, Iran

Khoshk-e Bijar District Persian: بخش خشک بیجار
- District
- Location within Iran
- Coordinates: 37°23′N 49°46′E
- Country: Iran
- Province: Gilan
- County: Rasht
- Established: 1995
- Capital: Khoshk-e Bijar

Population (2016)
  - Total: 26,102
- Time zone: UTC+3:30 (IRST)

Khoshk-e Bijar District (Persian: بخش خشک بیجار) is in Rasht County, Gilan province, Iran. Its capital is the city of Khoshk-e Bijar.

== Demographics ==
=== Population ===
At the time of the 2006 National Census, the district's population was 28,051 in 8,147 households. The following census in 2011 counted 27,249 people in 8,881 households. The 2016 census measured the population of the district as 26,102 inhabitants in 9,122 households.

=== Administrative divisions ===
Khoshk-e Bijar District Population
| Administrative Divisions | 2006 | 2011 | 2016 |
|---|---|---|---|
| Hajji Bekandeh-ye Khoshk-e Bijar RD | 9,973 | 9,793 | 9,282 |
| Nowsher-e Khoshk-e Bijar RD | 10,600 | 10,323 | 9,575 |
| Khoshk-e Bijar (city) | 7,478 | 7,133 | 7,245 |
| Total | 28,051 | 27,249 | 26,102 |
RD = Rural District
