= Kesari =

Kesari may refer to:

== Arts and entertainment ==
=== Films ===
- Kesari (2018 film), a Nigerian Yoruba-language film
- Kesari (2019 film), an Indian Hindi-language film
  - Kesari (soundtrack)
- Kesari (2020 film), an Indian Marathi-language film
- Kesari Chapter 2, a 2025 Indian Hindi-language film
- Kesari Veer, a 2025 Indian Hindi-language film
- Andhra Kesari (film), a 1983 Indian Telugu-language film
- Bhagavanth Kesari, a 2023 Indian Telugu-language film
- Hind Kesari (film), a 1935 Indian Hindi-language film
- Kerala Kesari, a 1951 Indian Malayalam-language film
- Punjab Kesari (film), a 1938 Indian Tamil-language film
- Veera Kesari, a 1963 Indian Kannada-language film

=== Sports ===
- Bharat Kesari, an Indian wrestling championship
- Hind Kesari, an Indian wrestling championship
- Maharashtra Kesari, an Indian wrestling championship

=== Television ===
- Kesari Nandan, a 2019 Indian television show

== Print media ==
=== Newspapers ===
- Kesari (Malayalam newspaper), a defunct Indian Malayalam-language newspaper
- Kesari (Marathi newspaper), an Indian Marathi-language newspaper established by Bal Gangadhar Tilak
- Punjab Kesari, an Indian Hindi-language newspaper

=== Magazines ===
- Kesari (magazine), an Indian Malayalam-language magazine
- Vedanta Kesari, an Indian English-language magazine

== People ==
=== Given name and middle name ===
- Kesari Balakrishna Pillai (1889–1960), Indian writer, critic in Malayalam who wrote under the pseudonym Kesari, and the name of a Malayalam-language newspaper he started
- Kesari Singh (1857–1925), Maharao of Sirohi
- Kesari Singh Barahath (1872–1941), Indian poet and freedom fighter
- Kesari Singh Rajpurohit (1680–1731), military commander and rajguru of the Kingdom of Marwar
- Sri Kesari Warmadewa, first king of Bali
- Kesari (Ramayana), father of Hanuman in Hindu mythology
- Bira Kesari Deo (1927–2012), Indian politician

=== Surname ===
- Pankaj Kesari, Indian actor
- K. N. Kesari (1875–1953), Indian physician, social reformer, philanthropist, author, magazine editor and music patron
- Kamraj Kesari (1922–1985), cricketer
- M. I. Kesari, fourth Bishop of Kanyakumari of the Church of South India
- Narayan Singh Kesari (born 1936), Indian politician
- Santosh Kesari, Indian-American neuro-oncologist and neurologist

=== Epithets and pseudonyms ===
- 'Andhra Kesari', the epithet of Tanguturi Prakasam (1872–1957), Indian jurist, politician, and Gandhian anti-colonial nationalist
- 'Bihar Kesari', a popular name of Shri Krishna Sinha (1887–1961), Indian politician
- Vengayil Kunhiraman Nayanar (1861–1914), Indian writer who also used Kesari as a pseudonym

== Other uses ==
- Kesari bat, a South Indian dessert
- Kesari dynasty, a medieval Indian dynasty (9th–12th centuries)
- Andhra Kesari University, a public university in Ongole, Andhra Pradesh, India
- INS Kesari, ships of the Indian Navy

== See also ==
- Kesar (disambiguation)
- Keshar (disambiguation)
- Arikesari (disambiguation)
- Khesari, a type of grass pea Lathyrus sativus
- Khesari Lal Yadav, Indian actor, singer, comedian and dancer
- Kesaria, town in Bihar, India
  - Kesaria (Vidhan Sabha constituency)
- Kesaria, Bihar, village in Bihar, India
- Kesaria Stupa, Gupta-era stupa in East Champaran district of Bihar, India
- Kesaria Peda, an Indian sweet
- "Kesariya Balam", folk song from Rajasthan, India
  - Kesariya Balam Aavo Hamare Des, Indian TV series, titled after the song
- "Kesariya" (song), song by Pritam and Arijit Singh from the Indian film Brahmāstra
- Kesariyaji, Jain temple in the state of Rajasthan
