= Vishka (disambiguation) =

Vishka is a village in Gilan Province, Iran.

Vishka (Persian: ويشكا) may also refer to:

- Vishka Matir
- Vishka Nanak
- Vishka Suqeh
- Vishka Varzal
- Vishka, Sowme'eh Sara
- Vishka (film)

== See also ==
- Vyshka (disambiguation)
