= Alman, Iran =

Alman (Persian: المان) may refer to:

- Alman-e Qadim, East Azerbaijan Province
- Alman, Rasht, Gilan Province
- Alman, Khoshk-e Bijar, Rasht County, Gilan Province
- Alman, alternate name of Pastak, Rasht County, Gilan Province
