= Aj Bisheh =

Neighborhood in Gilan province, Iran

Aj Bisheh Persian: آج بیشه
- Neighborhood
- Location within Iran
- Coordinates: 37°17′10″N 49°38′35″E
- Country: Iran
- Province: Gilan
- County: Rasht
- District: Central
- City: Rasht

Population (2016)
  - Total: 542
- Time zone: UTC+3:30 (IRST)

Aj Bisheh (Persian: آج بیشه) is a neighborhood in the city of Rasht in the Central District of Rasht County, Gilan province, Iran.

== Demographics ==
=== Population ===
Aj Bisheh did not appear in the 2006 and 2011 National Censuses, when it was a village in Howmeh Rural District of the Central District. The 2016 census measured the population of the village as 542 people in 179 households. After the census, the village was absorbed by the city of Rasht.

== Geography ==
Aj Bisheh is now part of the 3rd municipal district in the Rasht metropolis, and is among the underprivileged neighborhoods of the city. It is connected to the village of Lacheh Gurab to the east and Bijar Boneh to the north, with Rasht's main urban area to the west.
