= Lakan, Iran =

Lakan (Persian: لاكان or لكان) may refer to:

== Gilan Province ==
(لاكان - Lākān)

- Lakan, Gilan
- Lakan Institute, Gilan Province
- Lakan Rural District, in Gilan Province

== Markazi Province ==
(لكان - Lakān)

- Lakan, Markazi
