= Khajan =

Khajan may refer to:

- Khajan-e Chahar Dang, a village in Gilan, Iran
- Khajan-e Do Dang, a village in Gilan, Iran
- Khajan Singh (born 1964), Indian swimmer
- Khajan Dass, Indian politician

== See also ==
- Khazana (disambiguation)
- Kot Khajana, a village in Punjab, India
- Khajani Assembly constituency, Uttar Pradesh Legislative Assembly, India
