= Gerakeh =

Neighborhood in Gilan province, Iran

Gerakeh Persian: گراكه
- Neighborhood
- Location within Iran
- Coordinates: 37°20′39″N 49°32′30″E
- Country: Iran
- Province: Gilan
- County: Rasht
- District: Central
- City: Pir Bazar

Population (2011)
  - Total: 828
- Time zone: UTC+3:30 (IRST)

Gerakeh (Persian: گراكه) (Note: Also romanized as Gerākeh; also known as Gerāgeh) is a neighborhood in the city of Pir Bazar in the Central District of Rasht County, Gilan province, Iran.

== Demographics ==
=== Population ===
At the time of the 2006 National Census, Gerakeh's population was 815 in 228 households, when it was a village in Pir Bazar Rural District. The following census in 2011 counted 828 people in 247 households.

After the census, the village of Pir Bazar merged with the villages of Galesh Gacheh, Gerakeh, Rajakol, Rasteh Kenar, Shams-e Bijar, Siah Rud Kenar, and Sukhteh Luleh. In 2020, Pir Bazar was converted to a city.
