= Jur Deh =

Jur Deh or Jowr Deh (Persian: جورده) may refer to:

- Jur Deh, Rasht
- Jur Deh, Rudsar
- Jur Deh, alternate name of Jir Deh, Rudsar
