= Kuyakh =

Kuyakh (Persian: كويخ) may refer to:

- Bala Kuyakh
- Pain Kuyakh
