= Galesh Gacheh =

Neighborhood in Gilan province, Iran

Galesh Gacheh Persian: گالش گاچه
- Neighborhood
- Location within Iran
- Coordinates: 37°21′11″N 49°32′05″E
- Country: Iran
- Province: Gilan
- County: Rasht
- District: Central
- City: Pir Bazar

Population (2011)
  - Total: 151
- Time zone: UTC+3:30 (IRST)

Galesh Gacheh (Persian: گالش گاچه) (Note: Also romanized as Gālesh Gācheh) is a neighborhood in the city of Pir Bazar in the Central District of Rasht County, Gilan province, Iran.

== Demographics ==
=== Population ===
At the time of the 2006 National Census, Galesh Gacheh's population was 159 in 40 households, when it was a village in Pir Bazar Rural District. The following census in 2011 counted 151 people in 4 households.

After the census, the village of Pir Bazar merged with the villages of Galesh Gacheh, Gerakeh, Rajakol, Rasteh Kenar, Shams-e Bijar, Siah Rud Kenar, and Sukhteh Luleh In 2020, Pir Bazar was converted to a city.
