= Safsar =

Neighborhood in Gilan province, Iran

Safsar Persian: صف سر
- Neighborhood
- Location within Iran
- Coordinates: 37°16′07″N 49°33′19″E
- Country: Iran
- Province: Gilan
- County: Rasht
- District: Central
- City: Rasht

Population (2016)
  - Total: 1,703
- Time zone: UTC+3:30 (IRST)

Safsar (Persian: صف سر) (Note: Also romanized as Şaf-e Sar, Şafsar, and Sefaser; also known as Şafat Sar and Şafḩ Sar) is a neighborhood in the city of Rasht in the Central District of Rasht County, Gilan province, Iran.

== Demographics ==
=== Population ===
At the time of the 2006 National Census, Safsar's population was 835 in 213 households, when it was a village in Pasikhan Rural District of the Central District. The village did not appear in the following census of 2011. The 2016 census measured the population of the village as 1,703 people in 507 households. After the census, the village was annexed by the city of Rasht.
