= Siah Rud Kenar =

Neighborhood in Gilan province, Iran

Siah Rud Kenar Persian: سياهرودكنار
- Neighborhood
- Location within Iran
- Country: Iran
- Province: Gilan
- County: Rasht
- District: Central
- City: Pir Bazar

Population (2011)
  - Total: 123
- Time zone: UTC+3:30 (IRST)

Siah Rud Kenar (Persian: سياهرودكنار) (Note: Also romanized as Sīāh Rūd Kenār) is a neighborhood in the city of Pir Bazar in the Central District of Rasht County, Gilan province, Iran.

== Demographics ==
=== Population ===
At the time of the 2006 National Census, Siah Rud Kenar's population was 121 in 40 households, when it was a village in Pir Bazar Rural District. The following census in 2011 counted 123 people in 37 households.

After the census, the village of Pir Bazar merged with the villages of Galesh Gacheh, Gerakeh, Rajakol, Rasteh Kenar, Shams-e Bijar, Siah Rud Kenar, and Sukhteh Luleh. In 2020, Pir Bazar was converted to a city.
