= Falak Deh =

Village in Gilan province, Iran

Falak Deh Persian: فلكده
- Village
- Location within Iran
- Coordinates: 37°13′01″N 49°33′02″E
- Country: Iran
- Province: Gilan
- County: Rasht
- District: Central
- Rural District: Lakan

Population (2016)
  - Total: 1,379
- Time zone: UTC+3:30 (IRST)

Falak Deh (Persian: فلكده) (Note: Also known as Falak Deh-e Pā’īn Maḩalleh) is a village in Lakan Rural District of the Central District in Rasht County, Gilan province, Iran.

== Demographics ==
People of Falak Deh speak Gilaki and Persian languages. Their agricultural products are rice, tea and silk.

Falak Deh Population history
| Year | Pop. | ±% |
|---|---|---|
| 1950 | 768 | — |
| 1966 | 864 | +12.5% |
| 1976 | 1,219 | +41.1% |
| 1986 | 1,355 | +11.2% |
| 2006 | 1,329 | −1.9% |
| 2011 | 1,411 | +6.2% |
| 2016 | 1,379 | −2.3% |

=== Population ===
At the time of the 1966 census, Falak Deh was in Derazlat Rural District, and had a population of 864 people in 138 households. The village has had elementary school, mosque and a village council, as well as radio connection. The 1976 census measured a population of 1,219 people in 216 households, by which time it was transferred to Howmeh Rural District.

At the time of the 1986 census, Falak Deh reached a population of 1,355 in 218 households, of which 569 were educated. Animal husbandry, Beekeeping and Fish farming were also common. Falak Deh also gained electricity connection by that time.

At the time of the 2006 National Census, the village's population was 1,329 in 357 households. The following census in 2011 counted 1,411 people in 436 households. The 2016 census measured the population of the village as 1,379 people in 435 households.
