= Khazana =

Khazana (lit. 'treasure' in Hindi-Urdu) may refer to:

- Khazana (1951 film), an Indian adventure film
- Khazana (1987 film), an Indian action-adventure film
- Khazana (2014 film), an Indian-American drama thriller film
- Khazana Building Museum, Hyderabad, India
- Khazana Jewellery, Indian jewellery brand
- Khazana (union council), Khyber Pakhtunkhwa, Pakistan
- Khazana Bawdi, a well near Beed, Maharashtra

== See also ==
- Khajan (disambiguation)
- Khazanchi (disambiguation)
- Khaznadar, a surname
- Khazan system, a traditional farming system of India
