= Takhteh Pol =

Takhteh Pol (Persian: تخته پل) may refer to:

- Takhteh Pol, Afghanistan
- Takhteh Pol, Iran
- Takhteh Pol, Gilan, Iran
