= Shams-e Bijar =

Neighborhood in Gilan province, Iran

Shams-e Bijar Persian: شمس بيجار
- Neighborhood
- Location within Iran
- Coordinates: 37°20′49″N 49°33′06″E
- Country: Iran
- Province: Gilan
- County: Rasht
- District: Central
- City: Pir Bazar

Population (2011)
  - Total: 2,587
- Time zone: UTC+3:30 (IRST)

Shams-e Bijar (Persian: شمس بيجار) (Note: Also romanized as Shams-e Bījār) is a neighborhood in the city of Pir Bazar in the Central District of Rasht County, Gilan province, Iran.

== Demographics ==
=== Population ===
At the time of the 2006 National Census, Shams-e Bijar's population was 2,494 in 709 households, when it was a village in Pir Bazar Rural District. The following census in 2011 counted 2,587 people in 816 households.

After the census, the village of Pir Bazar merged with the villages of Galesh Gacheh, Gerakeh, Rajakol, Rasteh Kenar, Shams-e Bijar, Siah Rud Kenar, and Sukhteh Luleh. In 2020, Pir Bazar was converted to a city.
