= Rasteh Kenar, Rasht =

Neighborhood in Gilan province, Iran

Rasteh Kenar Persian: راسته كنار
- Neighborhood
- Location within Iran
- Coordinates: 37°20′06″N 49°33′19″E
- Country: Iran
- Province: Gilan
- County: Rasht
- District: Central
- City: Pir Bazar

Population (2011)
  - Total: 1,059
- Time zone: UTC+3:30 (IRST)

Rasteh Kenar (Persian: راسته كنار) (Note: Also romanized as Rāsteh Kenār) is a neighborhood in the city of Pir Bazar in the Central District of Rasht County, Gilan province, Iran.

== Demographics ==
=== Population ===
At the time of the 2006 National Census, Rasteh Kenar's population was 1,293 in 369 households, when it was a village in Pir Bazar Rural District. The following census in 2011 counted 1,059 people in 310 households.

After the census, the village of Pir Bazar merged with the villages of Galesh Gacheh, Gerakeh, Rajakol, Rasteh Kenar, Shams-e Bijar, Siah Rud Kenar, and Sukhteh Luleh. In 2020, Pir Bazar was converted to a city.
