= Rajakol =

Neighborhood in Gilan province, Iran

Rajakol Persian: رجاكل
- Neighborhood
- Location within Iran
- Coordinates: 37°20′21″N 49°31′44″E
- Country: Iran
- Province: Gilan
- County: Rasht
- District: Central
- City: Pir Bazar

Population (2011)
  - Total: 381
- Time zone: UTC+3:30 (IRST)

Rajakol (Persian: رجاكل) (Note: Also romanized as Rajākol) is a neighborhood in the city of Pir Bazar in the Central District of Rasht County, Gilan province, Iran.

== Demographics ==
=== Population ===
At the time of the 2006 National Census, Rajakol's population was 328 in 88 households, when it was a village in Pir Bazar Rural District. The following census in 2011 counted 381 people in 114 households.

After the census, the village of Pir Bazar merged with the villages of Galesh Gacheh, Gerakeh, Rajakol, Rasteh Kenar, Shams-e Bijar, Siah Rud Kenar, and Sukhteh Luleh. In 2020, Pir Bazar was converted to a city.
