= Sukhteh Luleh =

Neighborhood in Gilan province, Iran

Sukhteh Luleh Persian: سوخته لوله
- Neighborhood
- Location within Iran
- Country: Iran
- Province: Gilan
- County: Rasht
- District: Central
- City: Pir Bazar

Population (2011)
  - Total: 42
- Time zone: UTC+3:30 (IRST)

Sukhteh Luleh (Persian: سوخته لوله) (Note: Also romanized as Sūkhteh Lūleh) is a neighborhood in the city of Pir Bazar in the Central District of Rasht County, Gilan province, Iran.

== Demographics ==
=== Population ===
At the time of the 2006 National Census, Sukhteh Luleh's population was 44 in 11 households, when it was a village in Pir Bazar Rural District. The following census in 2011 counted 42 people in 11 households.

After the census, the village of Pir Bazar merged with the villages of Galesh Gacheh, Gerakeh, Rajakol, Rasteh Kenar, Shams-e Bijar, Siah Rud Kenar, and Sukhteh Luleh. In 2020, Pir Bazar was converted to a city.
