= Fakhab =

Fakhab فخب
- Neighborhood
- Location within Iran
- Coordinates: 37°18′40″N 49°33′50″E
- Country: Iran
- Province: Gilan
- County: Rasht
- Bakhsh: Central
- City: Rasht

Population (2006)
  - Total: 3,851
- Time zone: UTC+3:30 (IRST)

Fakhab (Persian: فخب; also known as Esţakhr Faḩāb, Fagab, and Istakharfihāb) is a suburban neighborhood of Rasht city in Gilan Province, Iran.

Formerly, it was a village in Pir Bazar Rural District, in the Central District of Rasht County. At the 2006 census, its population was 3,851, in 1,039 families. Fakhab is on the banks of Gohar Rud river.

== Suburb of Rasht ==
Fakhab became a neighborhood in the urban area of Rasht. As a suburb of Greater Rasht, Fakhab has faced health problems such as poor garbage management and pollution of Gohar Rud by sewage. People of the area are mostly from the poorer classes of society.
