= Kesar (disambiguation) =

Kesar (saffron) is an Indian Hindi-language TV series from 2004 to 2007.

Kesar may also refer to:

- Kesar, Lakan, Rasht County, Gilan Province
- Kesar, Pasikhan, Rasht County, Gilan Province
- Kesar, Khuzestan

== See also ==
- Kesari (disambiguation)
- Kaiser (disambiguation)
