= Seyqalan-e Varzal =

Seyqalan-e Varzal صيقلان ورزل
- Village
- Location within Iran
- Coordinates: 37°11′24″N 49°32′21″E
- Country: Iran
- Province: Gilan
- County: Rasht
- Bakhsh: Central
- Rural District: Lakan

Population (2006)
  - Total: 523
- Time zone: UTC+3:30 (IRST)

Seyqalan-e Varzal (Persian: صيقلان ورزل, also Romanized as Şeyqalān-e Varzal) is a village in Lakan Rural District, in the Central District of Rasht County, Gilan Province, Iran. At the 2016 census, its population was 393, in 133 families, down from 523 people in 2006.
