= Mobarakabad, Rasht =

Village in Gilan province, Iran

Mobarakabad Persian: مبارک‌آباد
- Village
- Location within Iran
- Coordinates: 37°22′07″N 49°33′34″E
- Country: Iran
- Province: Gilan
- County: Rasht
- District: Central
- Rural District: Pir Bazar

Population (2016)
  - Total: 940
- Time zone: UTC+3:30 (IRST)

Mobarakabad (Persian: مبارک‌آباد) (Note: Also romanized as Mobārakābād; also known as Mobark Abade Hoomeh, Mūbārakābād, and Mubarykabad) is a village in, and the capital of, Pir Bazar Rural District in the Central District of Rasht County, Gilan province, Iran. The previous capital of the rural district was the village of Pir Bazar, now a city.

== Demographics ==
=== Population ===
At the time of the 2006 National Census, the village's population was 964 in 261 households. The following census in 2011 counted 957 people in 298 households. The 2016 census measured the population of the village as 940 people in 326 households.
