= Kazh Deh =

Village in Gilan province, Iran

Kazh Deh Persian: كژده
- Village
- Location within Iran
- Coordinates: 37°17′51″N 49°37′35″E
- Country: Iran
- Province: Gilan
- County: Rasht
- District: Central
- Rural District: Howmeh

Population (2016)
  - Total: 881
- Time zone: UTC+3:30 (IRST)

Kazh Deh (Persian: كژده) is a village in Howmeh Rural District of the Central District in Rasht County, Gilan province, Iran.

== Demographics ==
=== Population ===
At the time of the 2006 National Census, the village's population was 2,623 in 720 households. The following census in 2011 counted 812 people in 242 households. The 2016 census measured the population of the village as 881 people in 279 households.
