= Mangu Deh =

Village in Gilan province, Iran

Mangu Deh Persian: منگوده
- Village
- Location within Iran
- Coordinates: 37°20′17″N 49°34′01″E
- Country: Iran
- Province: Gilan
- County: Rasht
- District: Central
- Rural District: Pir Bazar

Population (2016)
  - Total: 781
- Time zone: UTC+3:30 (IRST)

Mangu Deh (Persian: منگوده) (Note: Also romanized as Mangū Deh; also known as Maskūdeh) is a village in Pir Bazar Rural District of the Central District in Rasht County, Gilan province, Iran.

== Demographics ==
=== Population ===
At the time of the 2006 National Census, the village's population was 1,020 in 280 households. The following census in 2011 counted 942 people in 284 households. The 2016 census measured the population of the village as 781 people in 271 households.
