= Galesh Mahalleh, Gilan =

Galesh Mahalleh گالش محله
- Village
- Location within Iran
- Coordinates: 37°13′29″N 49°31′24″E
- Country: Iran
- Province: Gilan
- County: Rasht
- Bakhsh: Central
- Rural District: Pasikhan

Population (2006)
  - Total: 299
- Time zone: UTC+3:30 (IRST)

Galesh Mahalleh (Persian: گالش محله, also Romanized as Gālesh Maḩalleh) is a village in Pasikhan Rural District, in the Central District of Rasht County, Gilan Province, Iran. At the 2016 census, its population was 256, in 96 families. Down from 299 in 2006.
