= Tekhsem =

Tekhsem تخسم
- Village
- Location within Iran
- Coordinates: 37°10′16″N 49°35′31″E
- Country: Iran
- Province: Gilan
- County: Rasht
- Bakhsh: Central
- Rural District: Lakan

Population (2006)
  - Total: 350
- Time zone: UTC+3:30 (IRST)

Tekhsem (Persian: تخسم, also Romanized as Takhsam; also known as Teksam) is a village in Lakan Rural District, in the Central District of Rasht County, Gilan Province, Iran. At the 2016 census, its population was 231, in 78 families, down from 350 people in 2006.
