= Tash, Iran =

Village in Gilan province, Iran

Tash Persian: طش
- Village
- Location within Iran
- Coordinates: 37°20′39″N 49°35′28″E
- Country: Iran
- Province: Gilan
- County: Rasht
- District: Central
- Rural District: Pir Bazar

Population (2016)
  - Total: 819
- Time zone: UTC+3:30 (IRST)

Tash (Persian: طش) (Note: Also romanized as Ţash and Tesh) is a village in Pir Bazar Rural District of the Central District in Rasht County, Gilan province, Iran.

== Demographics ==
=== Population ===
At the time of the 2006 National Census, the village's population was 964 in 251 households. The following census in 2011 counted 872 people in 281 households. The 2016 census measured the population of the village as 819 people in 297 households.
