= Khana Chah =

Village in Gilan province, Iran

Khana Chah Persian: خناچاه
- Village
- Location within Iran
- Coordinates: 37°16′40″N 49°40′40″E
- Country: Iran
- Province: Gilan
- County: Rasht
- District: Central
- Rural District: Howmeh

Population (2016)
  - Total: 1,683
- Time zone: UTC+3:30 (IRST)

Khana Chah (Persian: خناچاه) (Note: Also romanized as Khanā Chāh) is a village in, and the capital of, Howmeh Rural District in the Central District of Rasht County, Gilan province, Iran.

== Demographics ==
=== Population ===
At the time of the 2006 National Census, the village's population was 1,893 in 561 households. The following census in 2011 counted 1,810 people in 592 households. The 2016 census measured the population of the village as 1,683 people in 562 households.
