= Kafteh Rud =

Village in Gilan province, Iran

Kafteh Rud Persian: كفته رود
- Village
- Location within Iran
- Coordinates: 37°20′22″N 49°31′06″E
- Country: Iran
- Province: Gilan
- County: Rasht
- District: Central
- Rural District: Pir Bazar

Population (2016)
  - Total: 900
- Time zone: UTC+3:30 (IRST)

Kafteh Rud (Persian: كفته رود) (Note: Also romanized as Kafteh Rūd; also known as Kaft Rūd) is a village in Pir Bazar Rural District of the Central District in Rasht County, Gilan province, Iran.

== Demographics ==
=== Population ===
At the time of the 2006 National Census, the village's population was 893 in 247 households. The following census in 2011 counted 934 people in 281 households. The 2016 census measured the population of the village as 900 people in 320 households.
