= Pisheh Var =

Village in Gilan province, Iran

Pisheh Var Persian: پيشه ور
- Village
- Location within Iran
- Coordinates: 37°19′08″N 49°41′22″E
- Country: Iran
- Province: Gilan
- County: Rasht
- District: Central
- Rural District: Howmeh

Population (2016)
  - Total: 714
- Time zone: UTC+3:30 (IRST)

Pisheh Var (Persian: پيشه ور) (Note: Also romanized as Pīsheh Var; also known as Pīseh Var and Pīshevar) is a village in Howmeh Rural District of the Central District in Rasht County, Gilan province, Iran.

== Demographics ==
=== Population ===
At the time of the 2006 National Census, the village's population was 804 in 215 households. The following census in 2011 counted 684 people in 224 households. The 2016 census measured the population of the village as 714 people in 258 households.
