= Bijar Pas =

Village in Gilan province, Iran

Bijar Pas Persian: بيجارپس
- Village
- Location within Iran
- Coordinates: 37°14′27″N 49°37′49″E
- Country: Iran
- Province: Gilan
- County: Rasht
- District: Central
- Rural District: Howmeh

Population (2016)
  - Total: 1,177
- Time zone: UTC+3:30 (IRST)

Bijar Pas (Persian: بيجارپس) (Note: Also romanized as Bījār Pas and Bījār Pas-e Avval) is a village in Howmeh Rural District of the Central District in Rasht County, Gilan province, Iran.

== Demographics ==
=== Population ===
At the time of the 2006 National Census, the village's population was 660 in 184 households. The following census in 2011 counted 756 people in 248 households. The 2016 census measured the population of the village as 1,177 people in 381 households.
