= Mishamandan =

Village in Gilan province, Iran

Mishamandan Persian: ميشامندان
- Village
- Location within Iran
- Coordinates: 37°17′50″N 49°40′42″E
- Country: Iran
- Province: Gilan
- County: Rasht
- District: Central
- Rural District: Howmeh

Population (2016)
  - Total: 936
- Time zone: UTC+3:30 (IRST)

Mishamandan (Persian: ميشامندان) (Note: Also romanized as Mīshāmandān) is a village in Howmeh Rural District of the Central District in Rasht County, Gilan province, Iran.

== Demographics ==
=== Population ===
At the time of the 2006 National Census, the village's population was 1,174 in 313 households. The following census in 2011 counted 1,030 people in 335 households. The 2016 census measured the population of the village as 936 people in 302 households.
