= Gurab Varzal =

Gurab Varzal گوراب ورزل
- Village
- Location within Iran
- Coordinates: 37°11′19″N 49°33′04″E
- Country: Iran
- Province: Gilan
- County: Rasht
- Bakhsh: Central
- Rural District: Lakan

Population (2006)
  - Total: 499
- Time zone: UTC+3:30 (IRST)

Gurab Varzal (Persian: گوراب ورزل, also Romanized as Gūrāb Varzal) is a village in Lakan Rural District, in the Central District of Rasht County, Gilan Province, Iran. At the 2016 census, its population was 405, in 140 families, down from 499 people in 2006.
