= Mohammadabad, Gilan =

Mohammadabad محمداباد
- Village
- Location within Iran
- Coordinates: 37°21′21″N 49°31′42″E
- Country: Iran
- Province: Gilan
- County: Rasht
- Bakhsh: Central
- Rural District: Pir Bazar

Population (2006)
  - Total: 160
- Time zone: UTC+3:30 (IRST)

Mohammadabad (Persian: محمداباد, also Romanized as Moḩammadābād) is a village in Pir Bazar Rural District, in the Central District of Rasht County, Gilan Province, Iran. At the 2016 census, its population was 122, in 43 families. Down from 160 people in 2006.
