= Narenjkol =

Narenjkol نارنج كل
- Village
- Location within Iran
- Coordinates: 37°10′02″N 49°31′56″E
- Country: Iran
- Province: Gilan
- County: Rasht
- Bakhsh: Central
- Rural District: Lakan

Population (2016)
  - Total: 169
- Time zone: UTC+3:30 (IRST)

Narenjkol (Persian: نارنج كل, also Romanized as Nārenjkol; also known as Tārīkh Gal) is a village in Lakan Rural District, in the Central District of Rasht County, Gilan Province, Iran. At the 2016 census, its population was 169, in 30 families, up from 129 people in 2006.
