= Siah Galvandan =

Village in Gilan province, Iran

Siah Galvandan Persian: سياه گلوندان
- Village
- Location within Iran
- Coordinates: 37°11′51″N 49°30′02″E
- Country: Iran
- Province: Gilan
- County: Rasht
- District: Central
- Rural District: Lakan

Population (2016)
  - Total: 563
- Time zone: UTC+3:30 (IRST)

Siah Galvandan (Persian: سياه گلوندان) (Note: Also romanized as Sīāh Galvandān and Sīāh Golvandān; also known as Seklemandan, Sīāh Galūbandān-e Bālā, Sīāh Galūbandān-e Pā’īn, Sīāh Golvandān-e Bālā, and Sīāh Golvandān-e Pā’īn) is a village in Lakan Rural District of the Central District in Rasht County, Gilan province, Iran.

== Demographics ==
=== Population ===
At the time of the 2006 National Census, the village's population was 793 in 199 households. The following census in 2011 counted 608 people in 189 households. The 2016 census measured the population of the village as 563 people in 205 households.
