= Alavian =

Alavian or Alvian (Persian: علويان) may refer to:

- Alavian, East Azerbaijan
- Alvian, Gilan
