= Saqalaksar =

Village in Gilan province, Iran

Saqalaksar Persian: سقالكسار
- Village
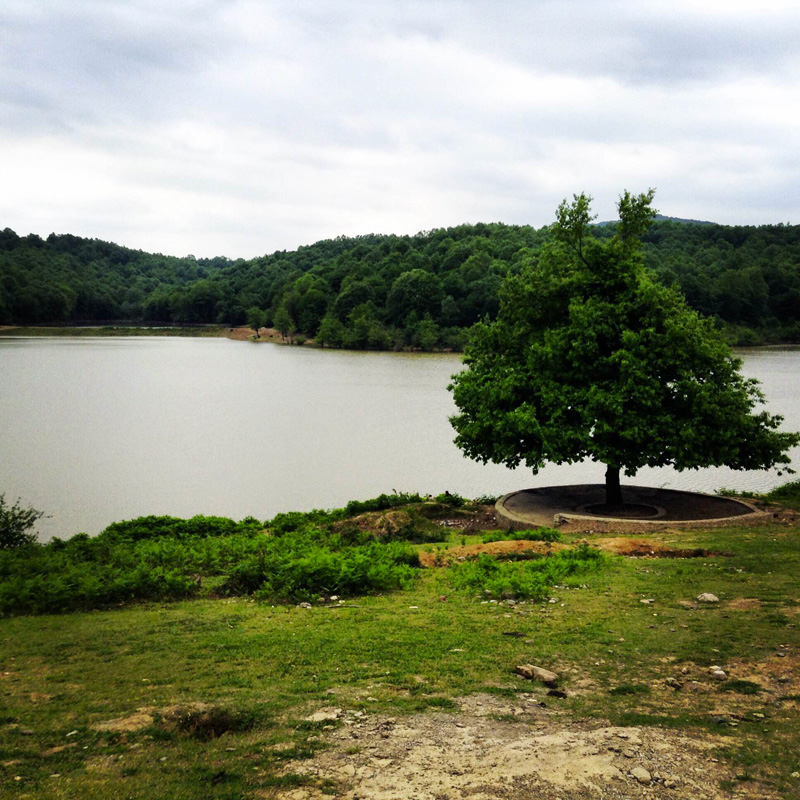
- The village of Saqalaksar

- Location within Iran
- Coordinates: 37°09′41″N 49°31′14″E
- Country: Iran
- Province: Gilan
- County: Rasht
- District: Central
- Rural District: Lakan

Population (2016)
  - Total: 689
- Time zone: UTC+3:30 (IRST)

Saqalaksar (Persian: سقالكسار) (Note: Also romanized as Saqālaksār) is a village in Lakan Rural District of the Central District in Rasht County, Gilan province, Iran.

== Demographics ==
=== Population ===
At the time of the 2006 National Census, the village's population was 584 in 168 households. The following census in 2011 counted 716 people in 229 households. The 2016 census measured the population of the village as 689 people in 230 households.

== See also ==
Media related to Saqalaksar at Wikimedia Commons
