= Rokan Sara =

Rokan Sara ركن سرا
- Village
- Location within Iran
- Coordinates: 37°19′15″N 49°36′29″E
- Country: Iran
- Province: Gilan
- County: Rasht
- Bakhsh: Central
- Rural District: Howmeh

Population (2016)
  - Total: 160
- Time zone: UTC+3:30 (IRST)

Rokan Sara (Persian: ركن سرا, also Romanized as Rokan Sarā) is a village in Howmeh Rural District, in the Central District of Rasht County, Gilan Province, Iran. At the 2016 census, its population was 160, in 56 families.
