= Pach Kenar =

Village in Gilan province, Iran

Pach Kenar Persian: پاچكنار
- Village
- Location within Iran
- Coordinates: 37°16′22″N 49°39′08″E
- Country: Iran
- Province: Gilan
- County: Rasht
- District: Central
- Rural District: Howmeh

Population (2016)
  - Total: 1,883
- Time zone: UTC+3:30 (IRST)

Pach Kenar (Persian: پاچكنار) (Note: Also romanized as Pāch Kenār; also known as Pācheh Kenār) is a village in Howmeh Rural District of the Central District in Rasht County, Gilan province, Iran.

== Demographics ==
=== Population ===
At the time of the 2006 National Census, the village's population was 1,638 in 456 households. The following census in 2011 counted 1,930 people in 560 households. The 2016 census measured the population of the village as 1,883 people in 580 households.
