= Ravajir =

Village in Gilan province, Iran

Ravajir Persian: رواجير
- Village
- Location within Iran
- Coordinates: 37°11′21″N 49°35′19″E
- Country: Iran
- Province: Gilan
- County: Rasht
- District: Central
- Rural District: Lakan

Population (2016)
  - Total: 4,728
- Time zone: UTC+3:30 (IRST)

Ravajir (Persian: رواجير) (Note: Also romanized as Ravājīr) is a village in Lakan Rural District of the Central District in Rasht County, Gilan province, Iran.

== Demographics ==
=== Population ===
At the time of the 2006 National Census, the village's population was 110 in 28 households. The following census in 2011 counted 129 people in 41 households. The 2016 census measured the population of the village as 4,728 people in 30 households. It was the most populous village in its rural district.
