= Do Ab Mardakh =

Do Ab Mardakh دواب مردخ
- Village
- Location within Iran
- Coordinates: 37°20′46″N 49°36′27″E
- Country: Iran
- Province: Gilan
- County: Rasht
- Bakhsh: Central
- Rural District: Howmeh

Population (2006)
  - Total: 270
- Time zone: UTC+3:30 (IRST)

Do Ab Mardakh (Persian: دواب مردخ, also Romanized as Do Āb Mardakh; also known as Deh-e Ābmardakh and Mardakh) is a village in Howmeh Rural District, in the Central District of Rasht County, Gilan Province, Iran. At the 2016 census, its population was 270, in 87 families, up from 250 people in 2006.
