= Tazehabad (37°13′ N 49°30′ E), Pasikhan =

Tazehabad تازه آباد
- Village
- Location within Iran
- Coordinates: 37°12′56″N 49°30′14″E
- Country: Iran
- Province: Gilan
- County: Rasht
- Bakhsh: Central
- Rural District: Pasikhan

Population (2016)
  - Total: 101
- Time zone: UTC+3:30 (IRST)

Tazehabad (Persian: تازه آباد, also Romanized as Tāzehābād) is a village in Pasikhan Rural District, in the Central District of Rasht County, Gilan Province, Iran. At the 2006 census, its population was 128, in 32 families.

At the time of the 2006 National Census, the village's population was 128 in 32 households. The following census in 2011 counted 101 people in 32 households. The 2016 census measured the population of the village as 101 people in 34 households.
