= Pir Deh, Gilan =

Village in Gilan province, Iran

Pir Deh Persian: پيرده
- Village
- Location within Iran
- Coordinates: 37°21′23″N 49°33′02″E
- Country: Iran
- Province: Gilan
- County: Rasht
- District: Central
- Rural District: Pir Bazar

Population (2016)
  - Total: 431
- Time zone: UTC+3:30 (IRST)

Pir Deh (Persian: پيرده) (Note: Also romanized as Pīr Deh; also known as Pirdekh) is a village in Pir Bazar Rural District of the Central District in Rasht County, Gilan province, Iran.

== Demographics ==
=== Population ===
At the time of the 2006 National Census, the village's population was 517 in 131 households. The following census in 2011 counted 437 people in 129 households. The 2016 census measured the population of the village as 431 people in 147 households.
