= Pasvisheh =

Village in Gilan province, Iran

Pasvisheh Persian: پسويشه
- Village
- Location within Iran
- Coordinates: 37°17′51″N 49°29′44″E
- Country: Iran
- Province: Gilan
- County: Rasht
- District: Central
- Rural District: Pasikhan

Population (2016)
  - Total: 576
- Time zone: UTC+3:30 (IRST)

Pasvisheh (Persian: پسويشه) (Note: Also romanized as Pasvīsheh; also known as Paspīsheh, Pasvīshad, and Pūysheh) is a village in Pasikhan Rural District of the Central District in Rasht County, Gilan province, Iran.

== Demographics ==
=== Population ===
At the time of the 2006 National Census, the village's population was 658 in 169 households. The following census in 2011 counted 610 people in 178 households. The 2016 census measured the population of the village as 576 people in 201 households.
