= Aziz Kian =

Aziz Kian عزيزكيان
- Village
- Location within Iran
- Coordinates: 37°08′57″N 49°33′14″E
- Country: Iran
- Province: Gilan
- County: Rasht
- Bakhsh: Central
- Rural District: Lakan

Population (2006)
  - Total: 132
- Time zone: UTC+3:30 (IRST)

Aziz Kian (Persian: عزيزكيان, also Romanized as ‘Azīz Kīān, ‘Aziz Keyān, and Azīz Kīyan) is a village in Lakan Rural District, in the Central District of Rasht County, Gilan Province, Iran. At the 2016 census, its population was 44, in 23 families, down from a population 132 at the time of the 2006 census.
