= Garfam =

Garfam گرفم
- Village
- Location within Iran
- Coordinates: 37°19′59″N 49°37′59″E
- Country: Iran
- Province: Gilan
- County: Rasht
- Bakhsh: Central
- Rural District: Howmeh

Population (2006)
  - Total: 535
- Time zone: UTC+3:30 (IRST)

Garfam (Persian: گرفم, also Romanized as Garfan) is a village in Howmeh Rural District, in the Central District of Rasht County, Gilan Province, Iran. At the 2016 census, its population was 490, in 166 families, down from 535 people in 2006.
