= Taraz Kuh =

Village in Gilan province, Iran

Taraz Kuh Persian: طرازكوه
- Village
- Location within Iran
- Coordinates: 37°18′26″N 49°30′48″E
- Country: Iran
- Province: Gilan
- County: Rasht
- District: Central
- Rural District: Pasikhan

Population (2016)
  - Total: 767
- Time zone: UTC+3:30 (IRST)

Taraz Kuh (Persian: طرازكوه) (Note: Also romanized as Taraz Kooh and Ţarāz Kūh; also known as Tarazku) is a village in Pasikhan Rural District of the Central District in Rasht County, Gilan province, Iran.

== Demographics ==
=== Population ===
At the time of the 2006 National Census, the village's population was 793 in 205 households. The following census in 2011 counted 772 people in 252 households. The 2016 census measured the population of the village as 767 people in 244 households.
