= Pir Kola Chah =

Village in Gilan province, Iran

Pir Kola Chah Persian: پيركلاچاه
- Village
- Location within Iran
- Coordinates: 37°15′47″N 49°37′47″E
- Country: Iran
- Province: Gilan
- County: Rasht
- District: Central
- Rural District: Howmeh

Population (2016)
  - Total: 2,437
- Time zone: UTC+3:30 (IRST)

Pir Kola Chah (Persian: پيركلاچاه) (Note: Also romanized as Pīr Kolā Chāh; also known as Pīr Kelā Chāy, Pīr Kolā Chāy, Pīr Kuleh Chāh, Pīr Kūleh Jāh, Pīrkolāchā, and Pirkulekh-Chakh) is a village in Howmeh Rural District of the Central District in Rasht County, Gilan province, Iran.

== Demographics ==
=== Population ===
At the time of the 2006 National Census, the village's population was 1,427 in 410 households. The following census in 2011 counted 2,048 people in 626 households. The 2016 census measured the population of the village as 2,437 people in 803 households. It was the most populous village in its rural district.
