= Bijar Kenar =

Village in Gilan province, Iran

Bijar Kenar Persian: بيجاركنار
- Village
- Location within Iran
- Coordinates: 37°17′29″N 49°28′39″E
- Country: Iran
- Province: Gilan
- County: Rasht
- District: Central
- Rural District: Pasikhan

Population (2016)
  - Total: 932
- Time zone: UTC+3:30 (IRST)

Bijar Kenar (Persian: بيجاركنار) (Note: Also romanized as Bījār Kenār; also known as Bidzharkinar and Bījār Kinār) is a village in Pasikhan Rural District of the Central District in Rasht County, Gilan province, Iran.

== Demographics ==
=== Population ===
At the time of the 2006 National Census, the village's population was 1,063 in 267 households. The following census in 2011 counted 1,033 people in 297 households. The 2016 census measured the population of the village as 932 people in 298 households.
