= Kolesh Taleshan =

Kolesh Taleshan كلش طالشان
- Village
- Location within Iran
- Coordinates: 37°14′28″N 49°31′06″E
- Country: Iran
- Province: Gilan
- County: Rasht
- Bakhsh: Central
- Rural District: Pasikhan

Population (2006)
  - Total: 192
- Time zone: UTC+3:30 (IRST)

Kolesh Taleshan (Persian: كلش طالشان, also Romanized as Kolesh Ţāleshān; also known as Golshan Ţāleshān) is a village in Pasikhan Rural District, in the Central District of Rasht County, Gilan Province, Iran. At the 2016 census, its population was 145, in 51 families. Down from 192 people in 2006.
