= Soleyman Darab-e Bala =

Village in Gilan province, Iran

Soleyman Darab-e Bala Persian: سليمانداراب بالا
- Village
- Location within Iran
- Coordinates: 37°15′33″N 49°34′15″E
- Country: Iran
- Province: Gilan
- County: Rasht
- District: Central
- Rural District: Lakan

Population (2016)
  - Total: 2,545
- Time zone: UTC+3:30 (IRST)

Soleyman Darab-e Bala (Persian: سليمانداراب بالا) (Note: Also romanized as Soleymān Dārāb-e Bālā; also known as Soleymān Dārāb, Soliman Darab, Sulaimān Darāb, and Sulayman-Darab) is a village in Lakan Rural District of the Central District in Rasht County, Gilan province, Iran.

== Demographics ==
=== Population ===
At the time of the 2006 National Census, the village's population was 222 in 61 households. The following census in 2011 counted 1,356 people in 428 households. The 2016 census measured the population of the village as 2,545 people in 813 households.
