= Askadeh =

Askadeh اسكده
- Village
- Location within Iran
- Coordinates: 37°09′42″N 49°32′54″E
- Country: Iran
- Province: Gilan
- County: Rasht
- Bakhsh: Central
- Rural District: Lakan

Population (2006)
  - Total: 90
- Time zone: UTC+3:30 (IRST)

Askadeh (Persian: اسكده; also known as Askīdeh) is a village in Lakan Rural District, in the Central District of Rasht County, Gilan Province, Iran. At the 2006 census, its population was 90, in 21 families, decreased to a population of 40 in 2016
