= Khesht Masjed, Pasikhan =

Village in Gilan province, Iran

Khesht Masjed Persian: خشت مسجد
- Village
- Location within Iran
- Coordinates: 37°16′15″N 49°29′21″E
- Country: Iran
- Province: Gilan
- County: Rasht
- District: Central
- Rural District: Pasikhan

Population (2016)
  - Total: 1,825
- Time zone: UTC+3:30 (IRST)

Khesht Masjed (Persian: خشت مسجد) (Note: Also romanized as Khashty-Mechet’) is a village in, and the capital of, Pasikhan Rural District in the Central District of Rasht County, Gilan province, Iran.

== Demographics ==
=== Population ===
At the time of the 2006 National Census, the village's population was 2,468 in 644 households. The following census in 2011 counted 2,623 people in 783 households. The 2016 census measured the population of the village as 1,825 people in 607 households. It was the most populous village in its rural district.
