= Kama Kol =

Village in Gilan province, Iran

Kama Kol Persian: كماكل
- Village
- Location within Iran
- Coordinates: 37°18′47″N 49°33′29″E
- Country: Iran
- Province: Gilan
- County: Rasht
- District: Central
- Rural District: Pir Bazar

Population (2016)
  - Total: 992
- Time zone: UTC+3:30 (IRST)

Kama Kol (Persian: كماكل) (Note: Also romanized as Kamā Kol) is a village in Pir Bazar Rural District of the Central District in Rasht County, Gilan province, Iran.

== Demographics ==
=== Population ===
At the time of the 2006 National Census, the village's population was 775 in 211 households. The following census in 2011 counted 847 people in 276 households. The 2016 census measured the population of the village as 992 people in 325 households.
