= Gurab, Rasht =

Gurab گوراب
- Village
- Location within Iran
- Coordinates: 37°19′54″N 49°40′03″E
- Country: Iran
- Province: Gilan
- County: Rasht
- Bakhsh: Central
- Rural District: Howmeh

Population (2006)
  - Total: 413
- Time zone: UTC+3:30 (IRST)

Gurab (Persian: گوراب, also Romanized as Gūrāb and Goorab; also known as Gufan and Gurakh) is a village in Howmeh Rural District, in the Central District of Rasht County, Gilan Province, Iran. At the 2016 census, its population was 339, in 116 families, down from 413 people in 2006.
