= Pileh Darbon =

Village in Gilan province, Iran

Pileh Darbon Persian: پيله داربن
- Village
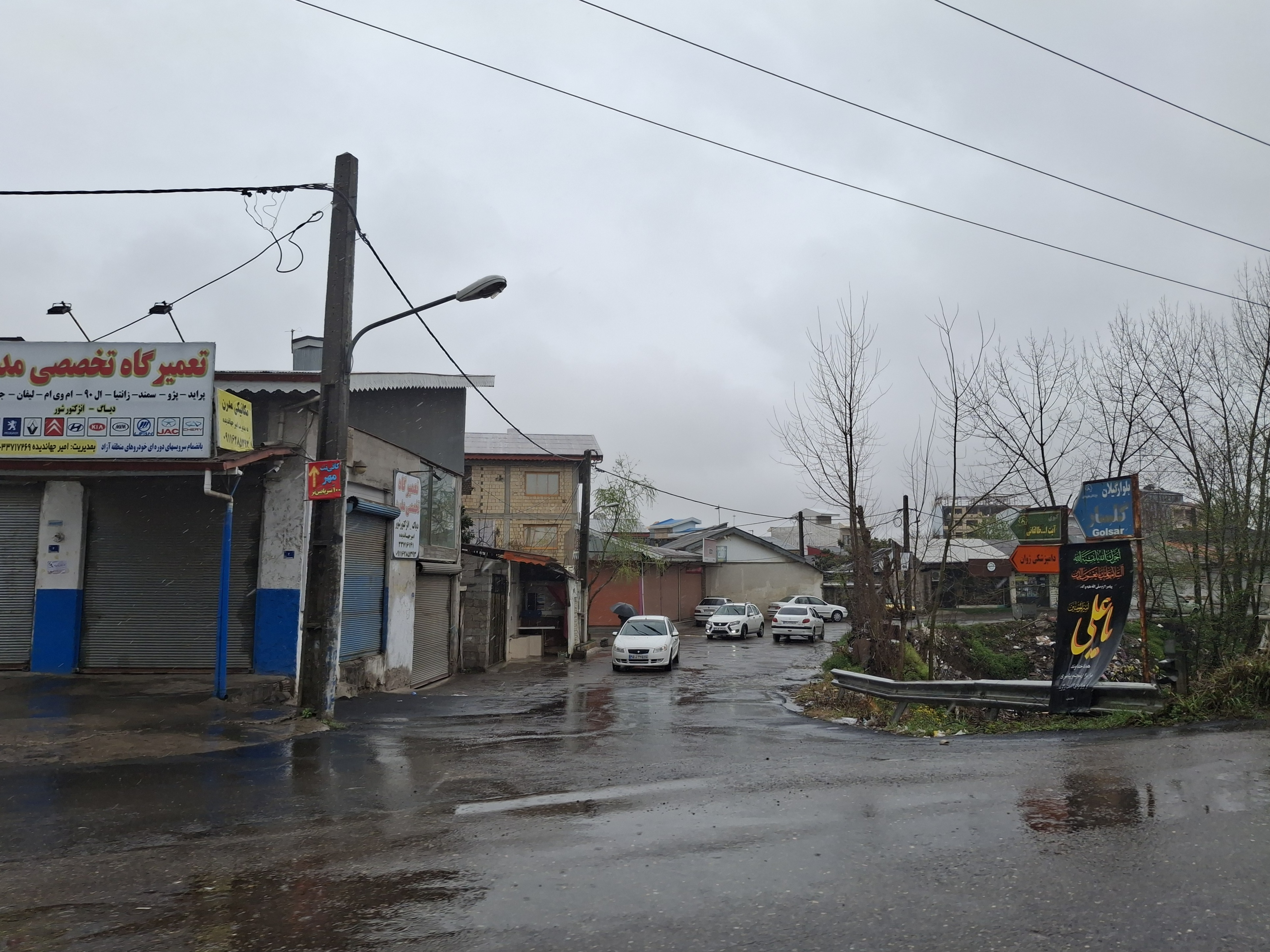
- The village of Pileh Darbon

- Location within Iran
- Coordinates: 37°19′06″N 49°34′10″E
- Country: Iran
- Province: Gilan
- County: Rasht
- District: Central
- Rural District: Pir Bazar

Population (2016)
  - Total: 1,141
- Time zone: UTC+3:30 (IRST)

Pileh Darbon (Persian: پيله داربن) (Note: Also romanized as Pīleh Dārbon; also known as Phileh Darab, Pilderbend, and Takhteh Pol) is a village in Pir Bazar Rural District of the Central District in Rasht County, Gilan province, Iran. Pileh Darbon is located just northwest of Rasht's urban area, on the road connecting the city to Pir Bazar.

== History ==
Pileh Darbon was the site of a battle during the Russo-Persian War on 23 June 1805, fought between Russian forces and the local people of Gilan. It is called "Battle of Pileh Darbon" because of many people getting killed in Pileh Darbon village.

In the early Qajar period, while Iranian military forces under the command of Abbas Mirza were fighting on the western fronts, the Russians entered from Bandar-e Anzali and moved towards Rasht through the historic Pirbazar waterway, hoping that the forces of Gilan lacked military knowledge and were unable to confront the Russians. However, the people's forces and a small number of military forces commanded by Mirza Musa Manjam Bashi, the ruler of Gilan, surprised the Russians at Pirbazar, causing the Russian colonel to flee after many casualties.

== Demographics ==
=== Population ===
At the time of the 2006 National Census, the village's population was 809 in 240 households. The following census in 2011 counted 1,093 people in 323 households. The 2016 census measured the population of the village as 1,141 people in 373 households.
