= Daf Sar =

Village in Gilan province, Iran

Daf Sar Persian: دافسار
- Village
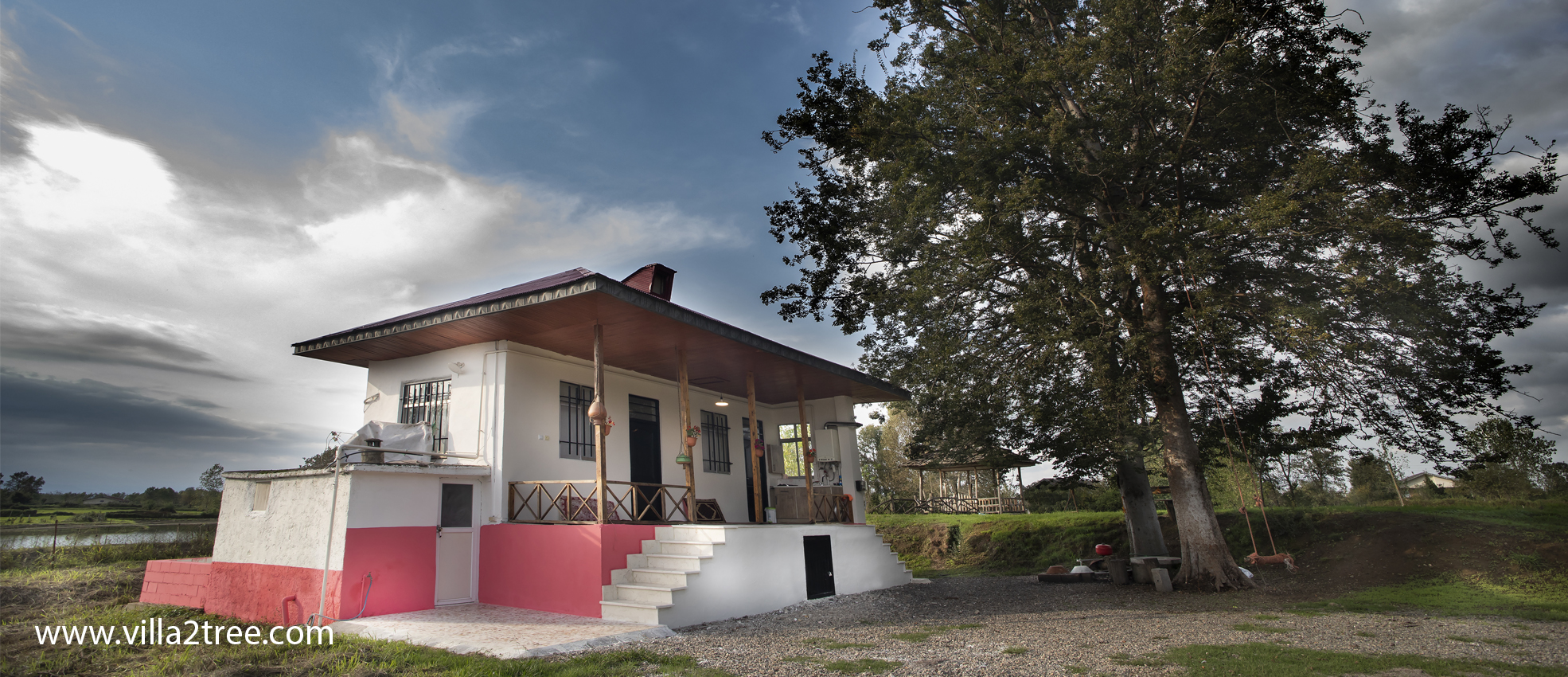
- Villa in Daf Sar

- Location within Iran
- Coordinates: 37°13′52″N 49°28′23″E
- Country: Iran
- Province: Gilan
- County: Rasht
- District: Central
- Rural District: Pasikhan

Population (2016)
  - Total: 415
- Time zone: UTC+3:30 (IRST)

Daf Sar (Persian: دافسار) (Note: Also romanized as Dāf Sār; also known as Davsar) is a village in Pasikhan Rural District of the Central District in Rasht County, Gilan province, Iran.

== Demographics ==
=== Population ===
At the time of the 2006 National Census, the village's population was 527 in 140 households. The following census in 2011 counted 482 people in 148 households. The 2016 census measured the population of the village as 415 people in 148 households.
