= Shalku =

Shalku شالكو
- Village
- Location within Iran
- Coordinates: 37°18′16″N 49°36′24″E
- Country: Iran
- Province: Gilan
- County: Rasht
- Bakhsh: Central
- Rural District: Howmeh

Population (2006)
  - Total: 683
- Time zone: UTC+3:30 (IRST)

Shalku (Persian: شالكو, also Romanized as Shālkū, Shalkoo, and Shālakū; also known as Masjed Shālīkū, Masjid Shālīku, and Shālīkūh) is a village in Howmeh Rural District, in the Central District of Rasht County, Gilan Province, Iran. At the 2016 census, its population was 398, in 130 families, down from 683 people in 2006.
