= Atashgah, Gilan =

Atashgah اتشگاه
- Village
- Location within Iran
- Coordinates: 37°16′32″N 49°30′11″E
- Country: Iran
- Province: Gilan
- County: Rasht
- Bakhsh: Central
- Rural District: Pasikhan

Population (2006)
  - Total: 1,679
- Time zone: UTC+3:30 (IRST)

Atashgah (Persian: آتشگاه, also Romanized as Ātashgāh) is a village in Pasikhan Rural District, in the Central District of Rasht County, Gilan Province, Iran. The village is a western suburb of Rasht city.

== Ppopulation ==
At the 2006 census, its population was 276, in 96 families. Big decrease from 1,679 people in 2006.
