= Bijar Khaleh =

Bijar Khaleh بيجارخاله
- Village
- Location within Iran
- Coordinates: 37°21′45″N 49°32′24″E
- Country: Iran
- Province: Gilan
- County: Rasht
- Bakhsh: Central
- Rural District: Pir Bazar

Population (2006)
  - Total: 280
- Time zone: UTC+3:30 (IRST)

Bijar Khaleh (Persian: بيجارخاله, also romanized as Bījār Khāleh; also known as Bidzhar-Khale) is a village in Pir Bazar Rural District, in the Central District of Rasht County, Gilan Province, Iran. At the 2016 census, its population was 189, in 64 families, down from 280 people in 2006.
