= Salkisar =

Village in Gilan province, Iran

Salkisar Persian: سلكی سر
- Village
- Location within Iran
- Coordinates: 37°09′57″N 49°34′06″E
- Country: Iran
- Province: Gilan
- County: Rasht
- District: Central
- Rural District: Lakan

Population (2016)
  - Total: 693
- Time zone: UTC+3:30 (IRST)

Salkisar (Persian: سلكی سر) (Note: Also romanized as Salkīsar and Selkī Sar; also known as Salkasar and Sil’kasar) is a village in Lakan Rural District of the Central District in Rasht County, Gilan province, Iran.

== Demographics ==
=== Population ===
At the time of the 2006 National Census, the village's population was 711 in 175 households. The following census in 2011 counted 2,297 people in 230 households. The 2016 census measured the population of the village as 693 people in 208 households.
