= Feyzabad, Gilan =

Feyzabad فيض اباد
- Village
- Location within Iran
- Coordinates: 37°20′50″N 49°31′14″E
- Country: Iran
- Province: Gilan
- County: Rasht
- Bakhsh: Central
- Rural District: Pir Bazar

Population (2006)
  - Total: 72
- Time zone: UTC+3:30 (IRST)

Feyzabad (Persian: فيض اباد, also Romanized as Feyẕābād) is a village in Pir Bazar Rural District, in the Central District of Rasht County, Gilan Province, Iran. At the 2016 census, its population was 49, in 18 families, down from 72 people in 2006.
