= Tuchi Payeh Bast =

Tuchi Payeh Bast توچي پايه بست
- Village
- Country: Iran
- Province: Gilan
- County: Rasht
- Bakhsh: Central
- Rural District: Howmeh

Population (2006)
  - Total: 225
- Time zone: UTC+3:30 (IRST)

Tuchi Payeh Bast (Persian: توچي پايه بست, also Romanized as Tūchī Pāyeh Bast) is a village in Howmeh Rural District, in the Central District of Rasht County, Gilan Province, Iran. At the 2016 census, its population was 225, in 66 families, up from 212 people in 2006.
