= Shekar Estalkh =

Village in Gilan province, Iran

Shekar Estalkh Persian: شكاراسطلخ
- Village
- Location within Iran
- Coordinates: 37°19′11″N 49°38′44″E
- Country: Iran
- Province: Gilan
- County: Rasht
- District: Central
- Rural District: Howmeh

Population (2016)
  - Total: 567
- Time zone: UTC+3:30 (IRST)

Shekar Estalkh (Persian: شكاراسطلخ) (Note: Also romanized as Shekār Esţalkh) is a village in Howmeh Rural District of the Central District in Rasht County, Gilan province, Iran.

== Demographics ==
=== Population ===
At the time of the 2006 National Census, the village's population was 430 in 113 households. The following census in 2011 counted 551 people in 173 households. The 2016 census measured the population of the village as 567 people in 184 households.
