= Kisar Varzal =

Kisar Varzal كيسارورزل
- Village
- Location within Iran
- Coordinates: 37°11′51″N 49°33′36″E
- Country: Iran
- Province: Gilan
- County: Rasht
- Bakhsh: Central
- Rural District: Lakan

Population (2006)
  - Total: 419
- Time zone: UTC+3:30 (IRST)

Kisar Varzal (Persian: كيسارورزل, also Romanized as Kīsār Varzal and Keysārvarzal) is a village in Lakan Rural District, in the Central District of Rasht County, Gilan Province, Iran. At the 2016 census, its population was 248, in 83 families, down from 419 people in 2006.
