= Khanaf Cheh =

Khanaf Cheh خنفچه
- Village
- Location within Iran
- Coordinates: 37°20′10″N 49°32′00″E
- Country: Iran
- Province: Gilan
- County: Rasht
- Bakhsh: Central
- Rural District: Pir Bazar

Population (2006)
  - Total: 264
- Time zone: UTC+3:30 (IRST)

Khanaf Cheh (Persian: خنفچه; also known as Khān Afjeh and Khanafjeh) is a village in Pir Bazar Rural District, in the Central District of Rasht County, Gilan Province, Iran. At the 2016 census, its population was 226, in 75 families, down from 264 people in 2006.
