= Galesh Kheyl =

Galesh Kheyl or Galesh Khil (Persian: گالش خيل) may refer to:

- Galesh Kheyl, Rasht
- Galesh Khil, Rezvanshahr
