= Polku =

Village in Gilan province, Iran

Polku Persian: پلكو
- Village
- Location within Iran
- Coordinates: 37°14′56″N 49°41′05″E
- Country: Iran
- Province: Gilan
- County: Rasht
- District: Central
- Rural District: Howmeh

Population (2016)
  - Total: 832
- Time zone: UTC+3:30 (IRST)

Polku (Persian: پلكو) (Note: Also romanized as Palaku, Polekū, and Polkū; also known as Paluka, Palūkūh, and Polūkū) is a village in Howmeh Rural District of the Central District in Rasht County, Gilan province, Iran.

== Demographics ==
=== Population ===
At the time of the 2006 National Census, the village's population was 976 in 285 households. The following census in 2011 counted 993 people in 337 households. The 2016 census measured the population of the village as 832 people in 293 households.
