= Tuysaravandan =

Village in Gilan province, Iran

Tuysaravandan Persian: تويسراوندان
- Village
- Location within Iran
- Coordinates: 37°14′12″N 49°39′48″E
- Country: Iran
- Province: Gilan
- County: Rasht
- District: Central
- Rural District: Howmeh

Population (2016)
  - Total: 849
- Time zone: UTC+3:30 (IRST)

Tuysaravandan (Persian: تويسراوندان) (Note: Also romanized as Tūysarāvandān; also known as Tū Sarāvandān, Tūrān Sarā, Tūsarāvandān, and Tūsarvandān) is a village in Howmeh Rural District of the Central District in Rasht County, Gilan province, Iran.

== Demographics ==
=== Population ===
At the time of the 2006 National Census, the village's population was 1,073 in 299 households. The following census in 2011 counted 947 people in 320 households. The 2016 census measured the population of the village as 849 people in 289 households.
