= Suqeh =

Suqeh or Suqa or Soogheh (Persian: سوقه) may refer to:

- Suqeh, Gilan
- Suqeh, North Khorasan
