= Vyshka =

Vyshka Russian: Вышка, lit. 'hightower' may refer to:

- Colloquial name of the National Research University – Higher School of Economics
- Vyshka, Russia, several rural localities in Russia
- Vyshka, Ukraine, a village in Velykyi Bereznyi Raion, Ukraine
- Vyshka (TV series), a Ukrainian TV series, variant of Celebrity Splash!

== See also ==
- Vishka (disambiguation)
