= Siah Estalakh =

Siah Estalakh or Siah Estalkh or Siyah Estalkh or Siah Astalakh (Persian: سياه اسطلخ) may refer to:

- Siah Estalakh, Rasht
- Siah Estalakh-e Mirza Rabi, Rasht County
- Siah Estalakh-e Saqad ol Molk, Rasht County
- Siah Estalkh, Sowme'eh Sara
