= Korchvandan =

Korchvandan كرچوندان
- Village
- Location within Iran
- Coordinates: 37°15′25″N 49°38′02″E
- Country: Iran
- Province: Gilan
- County: Rasht
- Bakhsh: Central
- Rural District: Howmeh

Population (2006)
  - Total: 112
- Time zone: UTC+3:30 (IRST)

Korchvandan (Persian: كرچوندان, also Romanized as Korchvandān; also known as Korchehvandān) is a village in Howmeh Rural District, in the Central District of Rasht County, Gilan Province, Iran. At the 2016 census, its population was 58, in 23 families, down from 112 people in 2006.
