= Pasikhan =

Village in Gilan province, Iran

Pasikhan Persian: پسيخان
- Village
- Location within Iran
- Coordinates: 37°14′58″N 49°28′33″E
- Country: Iran
- Province: Gilan
- County: Rasht
- District: Central
- Rural District: Pasikhan

Population (2016)
  - Total: 460
- Time zone: UTC+3:30 (IRST)

Pasikhan (Persian: پسيخان) (Note: Also romanized as Pasīkhān) is a village in Pasikhan Rural District of the Central District in Rasht County, Gilan province, Iran. Pasikhan is known in recent years for its iconic Pashikan Dam.

== Demographics ==
=== Population ===
At the time of the 2006 National Census, the village's population was 609 in 137 households. The following census in 2011 counted 488 people in 134 households. The 2016 census measured the population of the village as 460 people in 158 households.

== Notable people ==
Pasikhan is the attested birthplace of cleric and prophet Mahmoud Pasikhani, the founder of the Nuqtavi movement.
