= Katigar =

Village in Gilan province, Iran

Katigar Persian: كتيگر
- Village
- Location within Iran
- Coordinates: 37°10′52″N 49°30′52″E
- Country: Iran
- Province: Gilan
- County: Rasht
- District: Central
- Rural District: Lakan

Population (2016)
  - Total: 2,419
- Time zone: UTC+3:30 (IRST)

Katigar (Persian: كتيگر) (Note: Also romanized as Katīgar; also known as Kangar and Katkar) is a village in Lakan Rural District of the Central District in Rasht County, Gilan province, Iran.

== Demographics ==
=== Population ===
At the time of the 2006 National Census, the village's population was 2,039 in 569 households. The following census in 2011 counted 2,482 people in 788 households. The 2016 census measured the population of the village as 2,419 people in 778 households.
