= Khajan-e Do Dang =

Khajan-e Do Dang خاجان دودانگ
- Village
- Location within Iran
- Coordinates: 37°20′27″N 49°38′56″E
- Country: Iran
- Province: Gilan
- County: Rasht
- Bakhsh: Central
- Rural District: Howmeh

Population (2006)
  - Total: 143
- Time zone: UTC+3:30 (IRST)

Khajan-e Do Dang (Persian: خاجان دودانگ, also Romanized as Khājān-e Do Dāng; also known as Khājān) is a village in Howmeh Rural District, in the Central District of Rasht County, Gilan Province, Iran. At the 2016 census, its population was 110, in 37 families, down from 143 people in 2006.
