= Kesar, Pasikhan =

Village in Gilan province, Iran

Kesar Persian: كسار
- Village
- Location within Iran
- Coordinates: 37°15′49″N 49°28′04″E
- Country: Iran
- Province: Gilan
- County: Rasht
- District: Central
- Rural District: Pasikhan

Population (2016)
  - Total: 1,137
- Time zone: UTC+3:30 (IRST)

Kesar (Persian: كسار) (Note: Also romanized as Kesār; also known as Kāsān) is a village in Pasikhan Rural District of the Central District in Rasht County, Gilan province, Iran.

== Demographics ==
=== Population ===
At the time of the 2006 National Census, the village's population was 557 in 144 households. The following census in 2011 counted 559 people in 168 households. The 2016 census measured the population of the village as 1,137 people in 375 households.
