= Pastak =

Pastak پستک
- Village
- Location within Iran
- Coordinates: 37°18′56″N 49°35′10″E
- Country: Iran
- Province: Gilan
- County: Rasht
- Bakhsh: Central
- Rural District: Pir Bazar

Population (2016)
  - Total: 313
- Time zone: UTC+3:30 (IRST)

Pastak (Persian: پستک; also known as Alamān, ‘Alēmān, ‘Alimān, Ālmān, Ayman, and Pastak Ālmān) is a village in Pir Bazar Rural District, in the Central District of Rasht County, Gilan Province, Iran. At the 2016 census, its population was 313, in 108 families.

Pastak has turned into a neighborhood in Rasht's urban area during the 2000s.
