= Khajan-e Chahar Dang =

Village in Gilan province, Iran

Khajan-e Chahar Dang Persian: خاجان چهاردانگ
- Village
- Location within Iran
- Coordinates: 37°20′27″N 49°38′48″E
- Country: Iran
- Province: Gilan
- County: Rasht
- District: Central
- Rural District: Howmeh

Population (2016)
  - Total: 591
- Time zone: UTC+3:30 (IRST)

Khajan-e Chahar Dang (Persian: خاجان چهاردانگ) (Note: Also romanized as Khājān-e Chahār Dāng) is a village in Howmeh Rural District of the Central District in Rasht County, Gilan province, Iran.

== Demographics ==
=== Population ===
At the time of the 2006 National Census, the village's population was 553 in 143 households. The following census in 2011 counted 570 people in 167 households. The 2016 census measured the population of the village as 591 people in 204 households.
