= Bala Kuyakh =

Bala Kuyakh بالاكويخ
- Village
- Location within Iran
- Coordinates: 37°18′56″N 49°36′27″E
- Country: Iran
- Province: Gilan
- County: Rasht
- Bakhsh: Central
- Rural District: Howmeh

Population (2016)
  - Total: 428
- Time zone: UTC+3:30 (IRST)

Bala Kuyakh (Persian: بالاكويخ, also Romanized as Bālā Kūyakh; also known as Kūyakh-e Bālā) is a village in Howmeh Rural District, in the Central District of Rasht County, Gilan Province, Iran. At the 2016 census, its population was 428, in 135 families, up from 192 people in 2006.
