= Galesh Kheyl, Rasht =

Galesh Kheyl گالش خيل
- Village
- Location within Iran
- Coordinates: 37°22′37″N 49°32′30″E
- Country: Iran
- Province: Gilan
- County: Rasht
- Bakhsh: Central
- Rural District: Pir Bazar

Population (2006)
  - Total: 536
- Time zone: UTC+3:30 (IRST)

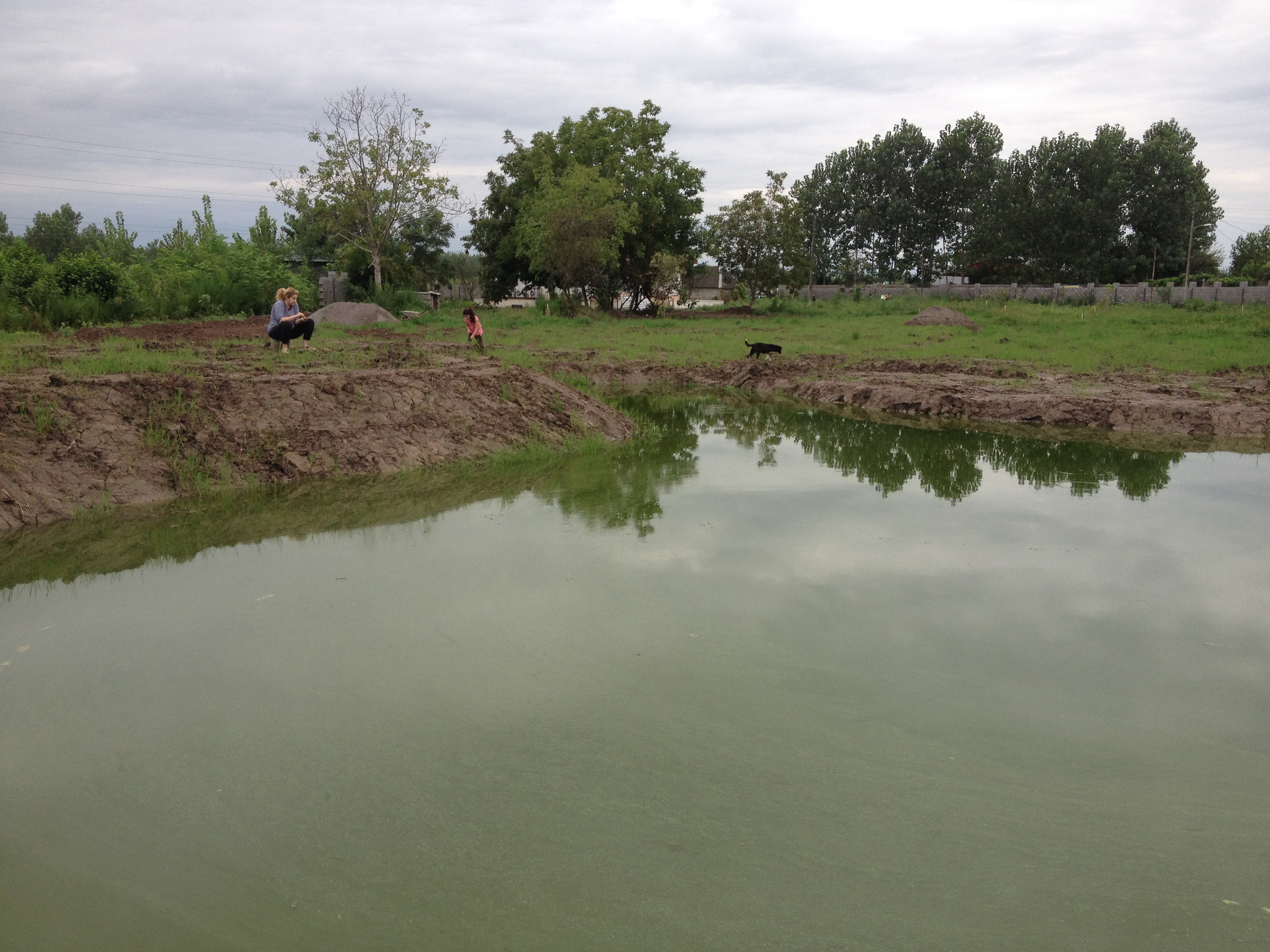
Home and garden in Galesh Kheyl

Galesh Kheyl (Persian: گالش خيل, also Romanized as Gālesh Kheyl and Galesh Khil; also known as Galishkheil and Galish Khel) is a village in Pir Bazar Rural District, in the Central District of Rasht County, Gilan Province, Iran. At the 2016 census, its population was 384, in 131 families. Down from 536 people.
