= Khazanchi =

Khazanchi (lit. 'treasurer' in Hindi-Urdu) may refer to:

- Khazanchi (1941 film), an Indian Hindi-language film
- Khazanchi (1958 film), an Indian Hindi-language film
- Khazanchi, Iran, or Qazanchi, a village in Miyan Darband Rural District, Kermanshah Province

== See also ==
- Khazana (disambiguation)
