= Alvian, Gilan =

Alvian علويان
- Village
- Location within Iran
- Coordinates: 37°18′56″N 49°30′18″E
- Country: Iran
- Province: Gilan
- County: Rasht
- Bakhsh: Central
- Rural District: Pir Bazar

Population (2006)
  - Total: 97
- Time zone: UTC+3:30 (IRST)

Alvian (Persian: علويان, also romanized as Ālvīan) is a village in Pir Bazar Rural District, in the Central District of Rasht County, Gilan Province, Iran. According to the 2016 census, its population was 56, residing in 22 families, down from 97 people in 2006.
