= Lakan Institute =

Lakan Institute انستيتو تكنولوژی لاكان
- Village/institute
- Country: Iran
- Province: Gilan
- County: Rasht
- Bakhsh: Central
- Rural District: Lakan

Population (2006)
  - Total: 52
- Time zone: UTC+3:30 (IRST)

Lakan Institute (Persian: انستيتو تكنولوژی لاكان – Anstītūt Kenūlzhī Lākān) is a village and institute in Lakan Rural District, in the Central District of Rasht County, Gilan Province, Iran. At the 2016 census, its population was 23, in 6 families, down from 52 people in 2006.
