= Jur Deh, Rasht =

Jur Deh جورده
- Village
- Country: Iran
- Province: Gilan
- County: Rasht
- Bakhsh: Central
- Rural District: Pir Bazar

Population (2006)
  - Total: 113
- Time zone: UTC+3:30 (IRST)

Jur Deh (Persian: جورده, also Romanized as Jūr Deh) is a village in Pir Bazar Rural District, in the Central District of Rasht County, Gilan Province, Iran. At the 2016 census, its population was 113, in 37families. Up from 48 people in 2006.
