= Pain Kuyakh =

Pain Kuyakh پايين كويخ
- Village
- Location within Iran
- Coordinates: 37°21′12″N 49°35′50″E
- Country: Iran
- Province: Gilan
- County: Rasht
- Bakhsh: Central
- Rural District: Howmeh

Population (2016)
  - Total: 293
- Time zone: UTC+3:30 (IRST)

Pain Kuyakh (Persian: پايين كويخ, also Romanized as Pā’īn Kūyakh; also known as Kūyakh-e Pā’īn) is a village in Howmeh Rural District, in the Central District of Rasht County, Gilan Province, Iran. At the 2016 census, its population was 293, in 97 families, up from 272 people in 2006.
