= Lacheh Gurab =

Village in Gilan province, Iran

Lacheh Gurab Persian: لچه گوراب
- Village
- Location within Iran
- Coordinates: 37°16′52″N 49°39′29″E
- Country: Iran
- Province: Gilan
- County: Rasht
- District: Central
- Rural District: Howmeh

Population (2016)
  - Total: 2,251
- Time zone: UTC+3:30 (IRST)

Lacheh Gurab (Persian: لچه گوراب) (Note: Also romanized as Lacheh Goorab, Lacheh Gūrāb, and Lecheh Gūrāb; also known as Lajeh Gūrāb, Lūch Gūrāb, Luchurab, and Lūj Gurāb) is a village in Howmeh Rural District of the Central District in Rasht County, Gilan province, Iran.

== Demographics ==
=== Population ===
At the time of the 2006 National Census, the village's population was 2,013 in 557 households. The following census in 2011 counted 3,102 people in 978 households. The 2016 census measured the population of the village as 2,251 people in 767 households.
