= Vishka Matir =

Vishka Matir ويشكاماتير
- Village
- Country: Iran
- Province: Gilan
- County: Rasht
- Bakhsh: Central
- Rural District: Lakan

Population (2006)
  - Total: 204
- Time zone: UTC+3:30 (IRST)

Vishka Matir (Persian: ويشكاماتير, also Romanized as Vīshkā Mātīr) is a village in Lakan Rural District, in the Central District of Rasht County, Gilan Province, Iran. At the 2016 census, its population was 172, in 62 families, down from 204 people in 2006.
