= Lakan, Gilan =

Village in Gilan province, Iran

Lakan Persian: لاكان
- Village
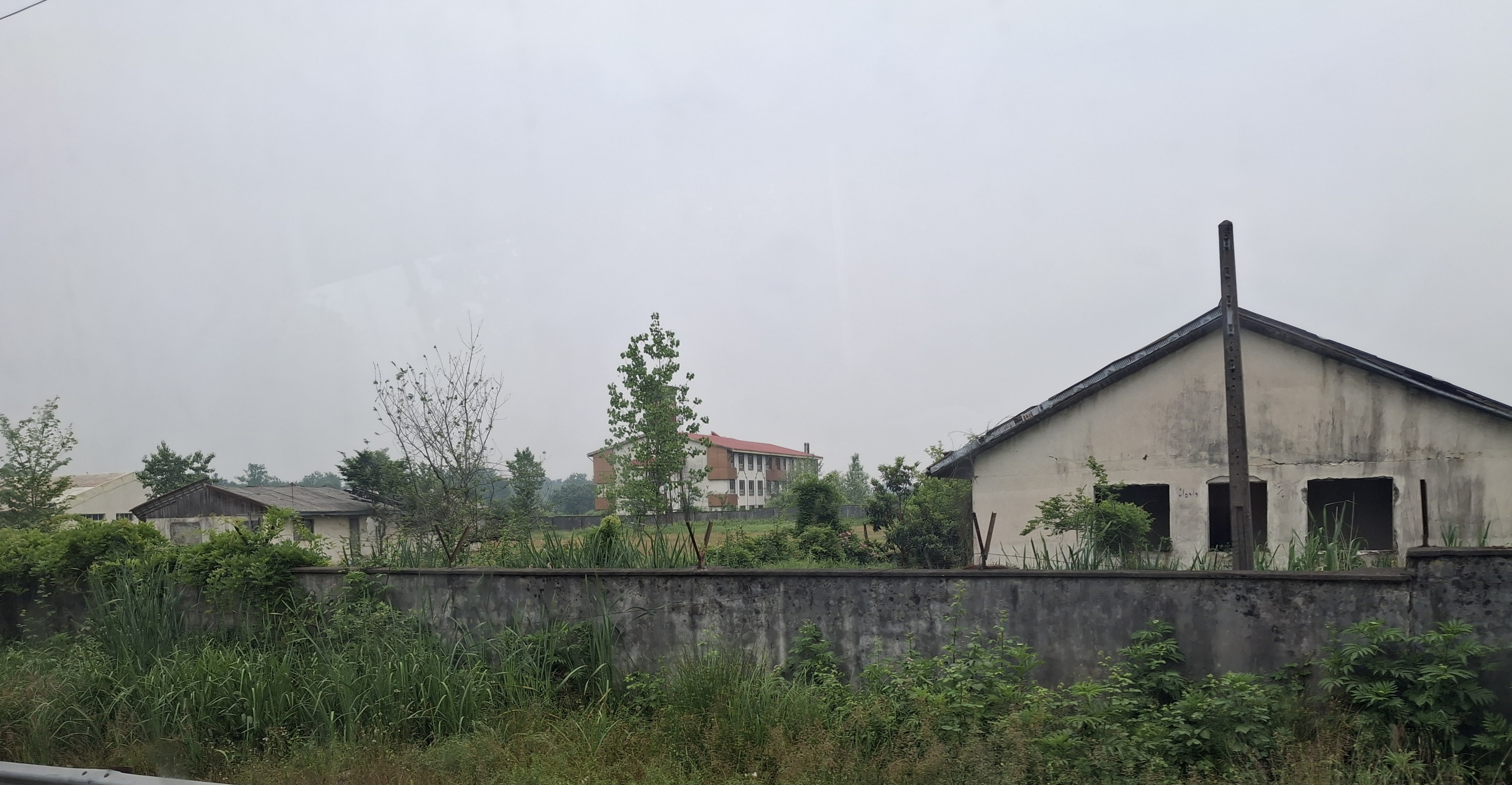
- Lakan in 2025

- Location within Iran
- Coordinates: 37°12′33″N 49°35′38″E
- Country: Iran
- Province: Gilan
- County: Rasht
- District: Central
- Rural District: Lakan

Population (2016)
  - Total: 284
- Time zone: UTC+3:30 (IRST)

Lakan (Persian: لاكان) (Note: Also romanized as Lākān; also known as Sīmbar-e Lākān) is a village in, and the capital of, Lakan Rural District in the Central District of Rasht County, Gilan province, Iran.

== History ==
At the time of the 1976 census, Lakan had power but not tap water. It also had mosque, medical clinic, shop, bakery, and elementary school. In 1986, the village also had a middle school and its road connection was asphalt.

== Demographics ==
=== Population ===
At the time of the 2006 National Census, the village's population was 5,314 in 1,463 households. The following census in 2011 counted 302 people in 89 households as parts of the village was incorporated to Rasht city municipality. The 2016 census measured the population of the village as 284 people in 107 households.

Lakan Population History
Year	Pop.	±%
1956	1,040	—
1966	1,495	+43.8%
1976	1,560	+4.3%
1986	2,551	+63.5%
2006	5,314	+108.3%
2011	302	−94.3%
2016	284	−6.0%
