= Bijar Boneh, Rasht =

Village in Gilan province, Iran

Bijar Boneh Persian: بيجاربنه
- Village
- Location within Iran
- Coordinates: 37°17′44″N 49°39′00″E
- Country: Iran
- Province: Gilan
- County: Rasht
- District: Central
- Rural District: Howmeh

Population (2016)
  - Total: 1,440
- Time zone: UTC+3:30 (IRST)

Bijar Boneh (Persian: بيجاربنه) (Note: Also romanized as Bījār Boneh) is a village in Howmeh Rural District of the Central District in Rasht County, Gilan province, Iran.

== Demographics ==
=== Population ===
At the time of the 2006 National Census, the village's population was 1,359 in 402 households. The following census in 2011 counted 1,547 people in 477 households. The 2016 census measured the population of the village as 1,440 people in 475 households.
