= Vishka Suqeh =

Village in Gilan province, Iran

Vishka Suqeh Persian: ويشكاسوقه
- Village
- Location within Iran
- Coordinates: 37°18′34″N 49°40′22″E
- Country: Iran
- Province: Gilan
- County: Rasht
- District: Central
- Rural District: Howmeh

Population (2016)
  - Total: 518
- Time zone: UTC+3:30 (IRST)

Vishka Suqeh (Persian: ويشكاسوقه) (Note: Also romanized as Vīshkā Sūqeh; also known as Vīshgāh, Vishka Shoogheh, Vīshkā Sūqeh, Vīshkāh Sūqeh, and Vishke) is a village in Howmeh Rural District of the Central District in Rasht County, Gilan province, Iran.

== Demographics ==
=== Population ===
At the time of the 2006 National Census, the village's population was 723 in 207 households. The following census in 2011 counted 615 people in 203 households. The 2016 census measured the population of the village as 518 people in 193 households.
