= Arikesari =

Arikesari may refer to any of the following Indian kings:

- Arikesari Maravarman or Arikesari Parankusa, 7th century Pandyan king
- Arikesari I, 8th century king from the Vemulavada Chalukya dynasty
- Arikesari II, 10th century king from the Vemulavada Chalukya dynasty
- Arikesarin, 11th century Shilahara king

== See also ==
- Ari (disambiguation)
- Kesari (disambiguation)
