= Suqeh, Gilan =

Suqeh سوقه
- Village
- Location within Iran
- Coordinates: 37°20′29″N 49°37′42″E
- Country: Iran
- Province: Gilan
- County: Rasht
- Bakhsh: Central
- Rural District: Howmeh

Population (2006)
  - Total: 431
- Time zone: UTC+3:30 (IRST)

Suqeh (Persian: سوقه, also Romanized as Sūqeh) is a village in Howmeh Rural District, in the Central District of Rasht County, Gilan Province, Iran. At the 2016 census, its population was 377, in 126 families, down from 431 people in 2006.
