= Kesar, Lakan =

Kesar كسار
- Village
- Location within Iran
- Coordinates: 37°13′54″N 49°34′50″E
- Country: Iran
- Province: Gilan
- County: Rasht
- Bakhsh: Central
- Rural District: Lakan

Population (2006)
  - Total: 56
- Time zone: UTC+3:30 (IRST)

Kesar (Persian: كسار, also Romanized as Kesār; also known as Kesār Varzal, Kīsār, and Kvisar) is a village in Lakan Rural District, in the Central District of Rasht County, Gilan Province, Iran. At the 2016 census, its population was 23, in 7 families, down from 56 people in 2006.
