= Siah Estalakh, Rasht =

Village in Gilan province, Iran

Siah Estalakh Persian: سياه اسطلخ
- Village
- Location within Iran
- Coordinates: 37°17′56″N 49°33′11″E
- Country: Iran
- Province: Gilan
- County: Rasht
- District: Central
- Rural District: Pir Bazar

Population (2016)
  - Total: 3,336
- Time zone: UTC+3:30 (IRST)

Siah Estalakh (Persian: سياه اسطلخ) (Note: Also romanized as Sīāh Esţalakh, Sīāh Esţalkh, and Sīyāh Estalkh; also known as Siāh Sal, Siasal’, and Siyah Estelakh Hoomeh) is a village in Pir Bazar Rural District of the Central District in Rasht County, Gilan province, Iran.

== Demographics ==
=== Population ===
At the time of the 2006 National Census, the village's population was 4,415 in 1,194 households. The following census in 2011 counted 3,406 people in 1,021 households. The 2016 census measured the population of the village as 3,336 people in 1,085 households.
