= Vishka Varzal =

Vishka Varzal ويشكاورزل
- Village
- Location within Iran
- Coordinates: 37°13′35″N 49°33′34″E
- Country: Iran
- Province: Gilan
- County: Rasht
- Bakhsh: Central
- Rural District: Lakan

Population (2006)
  - Total: 174
- Time zone: UTC+3:30 (IRST)

Vishka Varzal (Persian: ويشكاورزل, also Romanized as Vīshkā Varzal; also known as Vīshgāh, Vīshkā, Vyshika, and Wīshgāh) is a village in Lakan Rural District, in the Central District of Rasht County, Gilan Province, Iran. At the 2016 census, its population was 161, in 54 families, down from 174 people in 2006.
