= Alman, Rasht =

Neighborhood in Gilan province, Iran

Alman Persian: آلمان
- Neighborhood
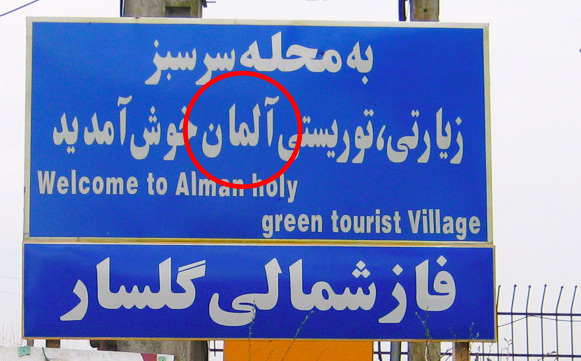

- Location within Iran
- Coordinates: 37°19′47″N 49°35′12″E
- Country: Iran
- Province: Gilan
- County: Rasht
- District: Central
- City: Rasht

Population (2016)
  - Total: 444
- Time zone: UTC+3:30 (IRST)

Alman (Persian: آلمان) (Note: Also romanized as Ālmān) is a neighborhood in the city of Rasht in the Central District of Rasht County, Gilan province, Iran.

== Demographics ==
=== Population ===
At the time of the 2006 National Census, Alman's population was 323 in 85 households, when it was a village in Pir Bazar Rural District of the Central District. The following census in 2011 counted 349 people in 102 households. The 2016 census measured the population of the village as 444 people in 141 households. After the census, the village was annexed by the city of Rasht.
