= Keshar =

Kesar means "saffron flower" in Sanskrit,

Kesar may refer to: The Saffron (Autumn) Crocus. It is a flower which mainly grows in northern India. It is used in decorating desserts and sweet dishes it is of red colour and gives the dish yellow colour and its taste.

== Places ==
- Keshar, Iran (disambiguation), places in Iran

== People ==
- Keshar Jung Rayamajhi, Nepalese politician
- Keshar Man Rokka, Nepalese politician

== See also ==
- Kesari (disambiguation)
