= Vyshka, Russia =

Vyshka (Russian: Вышка) is the name of several rural localities in Russia:

- Vyshka, Astrakhan Oblast, a selo in Rynkovsky Selsoviet of Limansky District in Astrakhan Oblast; 45°36′N 47°38′E
- Vyshka, Kirov Oblast, a village in Biserovsky Rural Okrug of Afanasyevsky District in Kirov Oblast; 59°10′N 53°12′E
- Vyshka, Nizhny Novgorod Oblast, a village in Nizhegorodsky Selsoviet of Dalnekonstantinovsky District in Nizhny Novgorod Oblast; 55°57′N 43°57′E
- Vyshka, Tver Oblast, a village in Zarechenskoye Rural Settlement of Maksatikhinsky District in Tver Oblast
- Vyshka (settlement), Yaroslavl Oblast, a settlement in Pokrovo-Sitsky Rural Okrug of Breytovsky District in Yaroslavl Oblast
- Vyshka (village), Yaroslavl Oblast, a village in Pokrovo-Sitsky Rural Okrug of Breytovsky District in Yaroslavl Oblast
