= Kesari (Malayalam newspaper) =

Indian weekly newspaper

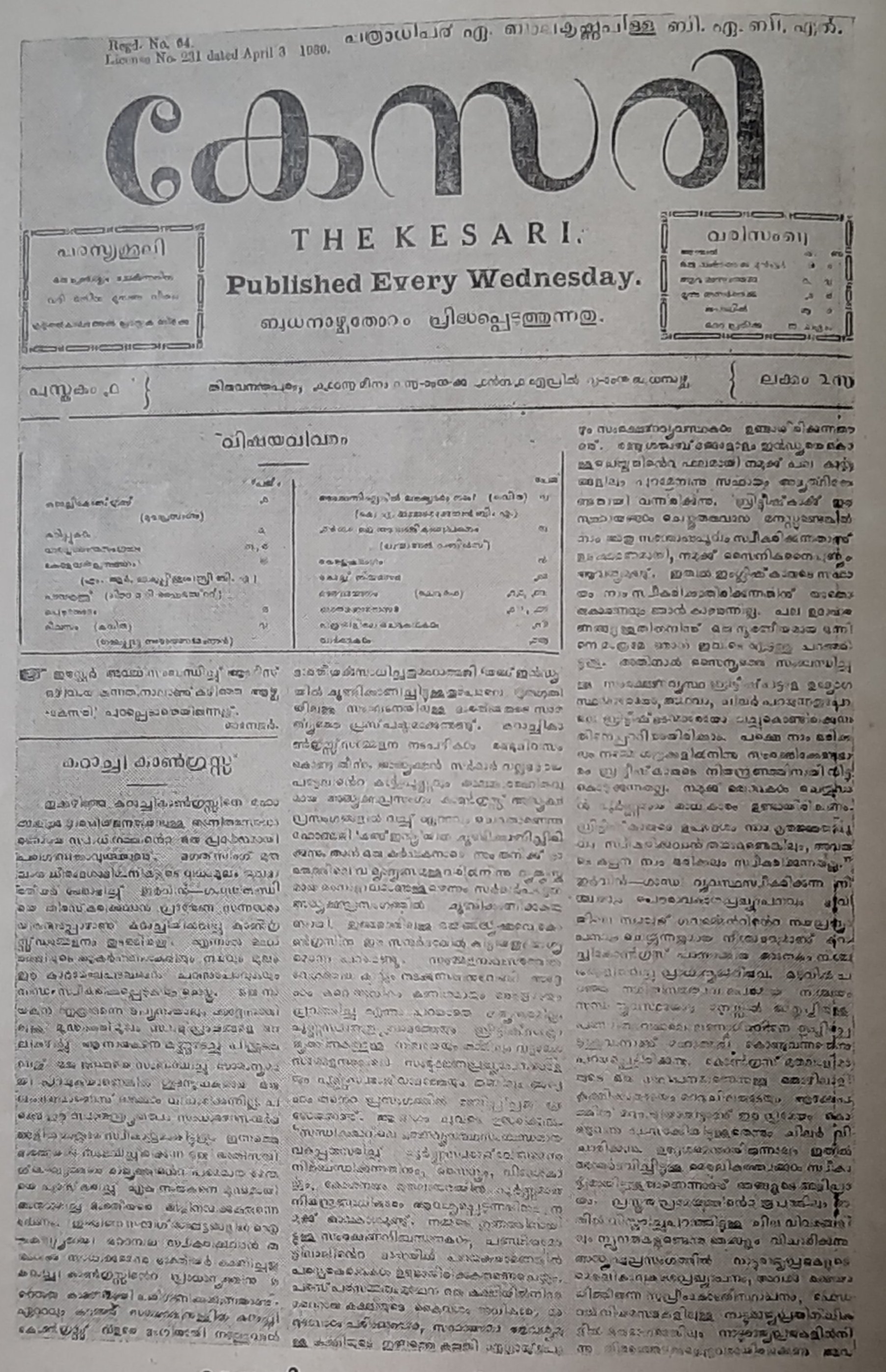

Kesari was an Indian weekly newspaper in Malayalam, published from Trivandrum under the editorship and ownership of A. Balakrishna Pillai, who later came to be known by the name Kesari Balakrishna Pillai. Pillai started the newspaper in 1930, a week after the license of his independent weekly Prabodhakan was revoked by the government per the Travancore Newspaper Regulations Act of 1926. Pillai was imposed a fine of Rs. 200 for contempt of court. Pillai obtained a new newspaper licence from Narayana Pillai who was running a weekly named Kesari at the time. Kesari effectively replaced Prabhodhakan and Pillai continued his fight against the government and corruption in the system through Kesari. It was printed at Sharada Press which Pillai had established in 1926. Pillai continued the publication of Kesari till 1935 when the Newspaper Act was modified and the transfer of press licenses was prohibited. According to the new law, the license fee was increased to Rs. 1,000. Pillai travelled to places like Malaysia and Singapore to collect funds but collecting money was seen as unethical so he did not go ahead with it. The newspaper was discontinued due to mounting debts in April 1935; Pillai had to sell Sharada Press to pay off the debts. Balakrishna Pillai's editorials for Kesari were popular. He strongly criticised the government through his editorials and also dealt with literary subjects. His articles in Kesari have been compiled and published as a book.
