= Santosh Kesari =

Indian American neurologist and neuro-oncologist

- Education: University of Pennsylvania - School of Arts and Sciences (1992); University of University of Pennsylvania - PhD degree in molecular biology (1996); University of Pennsylvania - MD (1999)
- Scientific career
- Fields: Neurology and neuro-oncology
- Thesis: Viral therapy for central nervous system neoplasms: Studies using an ICP34.5 deficient herpes simplex virus in murine models [dissertation]. Philadelphia (PA): University of Pennsylvania; 1996.

Santosh Kesari is an Indian-American neuro-oncologist and neurologist who currently serves as the chair and Professor of the Department of Translational Neurosciences and Neurotherapeutics at the Saint John's Cancer Institute.

== Early life and career ==
Kesari graduated from the University of Pennsylvania, School of Arts and Sciences in 1992. He received a PhD degree in molecular biology in 1996 and an MD from the University of Pennsylvania, School of Medicine in 1999.

Kesari is the Director of Neuro-oncology at Pacific Neuroscience Institute, Providence Saint John's Health Center and Providence Little Company of Mary Medical Center Torrance. He also leads the Pacific Neuroscience Research Center at Pacific Neuroscience Institute.

Kesari is a Fellow of the American Academy of Neurology (FAAN) and of the American Neurological Association (FANA).

== Scientific work ==
Kesari is the author of over 250 scientific publications, reviews, or books whose focus lies in the study of cancer stem cells and their role in the formation of brain tumors and resistance to treatment. His h-index is 73.
