= Kesaria village =

Kesaria
- Village
- Location within Bihar
- Coordinates: 27.108°N 84.464°E
- Country: India
- State: Bihar
- District: West Champaran district

Government
  - Type: Panchayati raj (India)
  - Body: Gram panchayat

Languages
  - Official: Hindi
- Time zone: UTC+5:30 (IST)
- ISO 3166 code: IN-BR

Kesaria is a village in West Champaran district in the Indian state of Bihar.

== Demographics ==
As of the 2011 census of India, Kesaria had a population of 5880 in 1001 households. Males constitute 51.78% of the population and females 48.21%. Kesaria has an average literacy rate of 40.49%, lower than the national average of 74%: male literacy is 63.5%, and female literacy is 36.4%. In Kesaria, 22.43% of the population is under 6 years of age.
