= Kot Khajana =

- Village
- Country: India
- State: Punjab
- District: Gurdaspur
- Tehsil: Batala
- Region: Majha

Government
  - Type: Panchayat raj
  - Body: Gram panchayat

Area
  - Total: 63 ha (160 acres)

Population (2011)
  - Total: 973; 498/475 ♂/♀
  - Scheduled Castes: 393; 198/195 ♂/♀
  - Total Households: 199

Languages
  - Official: Punjabi
- Time zone: UTC+5:30 (IST)
- Telephone: 01871
- ISO 3166 code: IN-PB
- Vehicle registration: PB-18
- Website: gurdaspur.nic.in

Kot Khajana is a village in Batala in Gurdaspur district of Punjab State, India. It is located 21 kilometres (13 mi) from sub district headquarter, 50 kilometres (31 mi) from district headquarter and 14 kilometres (8.7 mi) from Sri Hargobindpur. The village is administrated by Kanta turtur an elected representative of the village.

== Demography ==
As of 2011, the village has a total number of 199 houses and a population of 973 of which 498 are males while 475 are females. According to the report published by Census India in 2011, out of the total population of the village 393 people are from Schedule Caste and the village does not have any Schedule Tribe population so far.

== See also ==
- List of villages in India
