= Khazana Jewellery =

Jewellery house

- Type: Private
- Industry: Jewellery
- Founder: Kishore Kumar Jain
- Headquarters: Chennai
- Area served: India
- Key people: Kishore Kumar Jain
- Website: www.khazanajewellery.com

Khazana Jewellery is an organised jewellery retail house in South India.

== History ==
It was founded by Kishore Kumar Jain, and opened its first professionally managed retail showroom in Cathedral Road, Chennai, in 1993. It has since expanded to over 40+ showrooms across India. Khazana Jewellery has contributed ₹10 crore towards fighting the COVID-19 pandemic, this comprises ₹4 crore for Andhra Pradesh and ₹3 crore each for Tamil Nadu and Telangana

== Brand ambassadors ==
Former brand ambassadors for Khazana include Rashmika Mandanna, Tamannaah Bhatia, Samantha, Jacqueline Fernandez, Hema Malini and Khushbu. Presently Tamannaah bhatia is the brand ambassador.
