= Kesaria Peda =

Indian sweet dish

Kesaria peda is a sweet made for festivals and celebrations with milk solids, sugar and safforn (kesar). It was first prepared by Badhu Sao, during his imprisonment at kala pani when Queen Victoria, Empress of India, was going to visit kala pani, a jain in Andaman and Nicobar islands. The ingredients include Mawa (cream of the milk), sugar, cardamon powder, saffron, and almonds to garnish.
