= Alman-e Qadim =

Alman-e Qadim ال مان قديم
- Village
- Location within Iran
- Coordinates: 38°24′27″N 47°10′20″E
- Country: Iran
- Province: East Azerbaijan
- County: Ahar
- Bakhsh: Central
- Rural District: Bozkosh

Population (2006)
  - Total: 289
- Time zone: UTC+3:30 (IRST)
  - Summer (DST): UTC+4:30 (IRDT)

Alman-e Qadim (Persian: ال مان قديم, also Romanized as Ālmān-e Qadīm) is a village in Bozkosh Rural District, in the Central District of Ahar County, East Azerbaijan Province, Iran. At the 2006 census, its population was 289, in 67 families.
