= Lakan Rural District =

Rural district in Gilan province, Iran

Lakan Rural District Persian: دهستان لاكان
- Rural District
- Location within Iran
- Coordinates: 37°08′N 49°34′E
- Country: Iran
- Province: Gilan
- County: Rasht
- District: Central
- Established: 1987
- Capital: Lakan

Population (2016)
  - Total: 15,209
- Time zone: UTC+3:30 (IRST)

Lakan Rural District (Persian: دهستان لاكان) is in the Central District of Rasht County, Gilan province, Iran. Its capital is the village of Lakan.

== Demographics ==
=== Population ===
At the time of the 2006 National Census, the rural district's population was 21,251 in 5,923 households. There were 11,480 inhabitants in 3,067 households at the following census of 2011. The 2016 census measured the population of the rural district as 15,209 in 3,428 households. The most populous of its 22 villages was Ravajir, with 4,728 people.

=== Other villages in the rural district ===
- Askadeh
- Aziz Kian
- Falak Deh
- Gurab Varzal
- Katigar
- Kesar
- Kisar Varzal
- Lakan Institute
- Narenjkol
- Salkisar
- Saqalaksar
- Seyqalan-e Varzal
- Siah Galvandan
- Soleyman Darab-e Bala
- Tekhsem
- Vishka Matir
- Vishka Varzal
