= Pasikhan Rural District =

Rural district in Gilan province, Iran

Pasikhan Rural District Persian: دهستان پسيخان
- Rural District
- Location within Iran
- Coordinates: 37°16′N 49°30′E
- Country: Iran
- Province: Gilan
- County: Rasht
- District: Central
- Established: 1987
- Capital: Khesht Masjed

Population (2016)
  - Total: 8,723
- Time zone: UTC+3:30 (IRST)

Pasikhan Rural District (Persian: دهستان پسيخان) is in the Central District of Rasht County, Gilan province, Iran. Its capital is the village of Khesht Masjed.

== Demographics ==
=== Population ===
At the time of the 2006 National Census, the rural district's population was 10,018 in 2,602 households. There were 7,523 inhabitants in 2,267 households at the following census of 2011. The 2016 census measured the population of the rural district as 8,723 in 2,859 households. The most populous of its 13 villages was Khesht Masjed, with 1,825 people.

=== Other villages in the rural district ===
- Ateshgah
- Bijar Kenar
- Daf Sar
- Galesh Mahalleh
- Kesar
- Kolesh Taleshan
- Pasikhan
- Pasvisheh
- Taraz Kuh
- Tazehabad
