= K. N. Kesari =

Indian writer and philanthropist

- Born: Kota Narasimham; 26 April 1875; Inamanamelloor, Ongole district, Andhra Pradesh
- Died: 8 June 1953 (aged 78)
- Occupation: Physician
- Known for: Kesari Kuteeram
- Notable work: Chinnanati Muchhatlu (memoirs)

Dr K. N. Kesari (b: 26 April 1875 – d: 8 June 1953) was an Indian physician, social reformer, philanthropist, author, magazine editor and patron of music. His Kesari Kuteeram Ayurveda Oushadasala, an ayurvedic medicine manufacturing unit which also featured a music academy, was a landmark in Madras (now Chennai).

== Early life ==
He was born in Inamanamelloor in Ongole District of Andhra Pradesh as Kota Narasimham. His father died when he was five years old. His mother faced severe hardships during his childhood. At the age of 11, he went to Madras city. The story of his childhood was published in his memoir, Na Chinnanati Muchchatlu (Memories of my Childhood). Kesari succeeded in getting a scholarship to the Hindu Theological School and studied there. His mother joined him in 1889. She died after falling ill for a few days.

== Work ==
In 1928, Kesari founded and became editor of the Telugu magazine Gruhalakshmi, which encouraged women to engage in society and politics, fostered writing talent in women and sponsored the Gruhalakshmi Swarnakankanam award for women writers.

In 1943 Kesari took over the management of Mylapore Telugu Elementary School in Madras and provided an endowment which enabled it to be elevated to high school status. His educational philanthropy expanded in 1951 when he founded the Kesari Education Society, a charitable trust which now runs several schools.

The Carnatic vocalist and playback singer, P. Unnikrishnan, is Kesari's great-grandson.
