= Howmeh Rural District (Rasht County) =

Rural district in Gilan province, Iran

Howmeh Rural District Persian: دهستان حومه
- Rural District
- Location within Iran
- Coordinates: 37°17′N 49°39′E
- Country: Iran
- Province: Gilan
- County: Rasht
- District: Central
- Established: 1987
- Capital: Khana Chah

Population (2016)
  - Total: 20,449
- Time zone: UTC+3:30 (IRST)

Howmeh Rural District (Persian: دهستان حومه) is in the Central District of Rasht County, Gilan province, Iran. Its capital is the village of Khana Chah.

== Demographics ==
=== Population ===
At the time of the 2006 National Census, the rural district's population was 20,703 in 5,832 households. There were 20,664 inhabitants in 6,506 households at the following census of 2011. The 2016 census measured the population of the rural district as 20,449 in 6,788 households. The most populous of its 26 villages was Pir Kola Chah, with 2,437 people.

=== Other villages in the rural district ===
- Aj Bisheh
- Bala Kuyakh
- Bijar Boneh
- Bijar Pes
- Do Ab Mardakh
- Garfam
- Gurab
- Kazh Deh
- Khajan-e Chahar Dang
- Khajan-e Do Dang
- Korchvandan
- Lecheh Gurab
- Mishamandan
- Pach Kenar
- Pain Kuyakh
- Pisheh Var
- Polku
- Rokan Sara
- Shalku
- Shekar Estalkh
- Suqeh
- Tuchi Payeh Bast
- Tuysaravandan
- Vishka Suqeh
