= Kesari Balakrishna Pillai =

Indian writer (1889–1960)

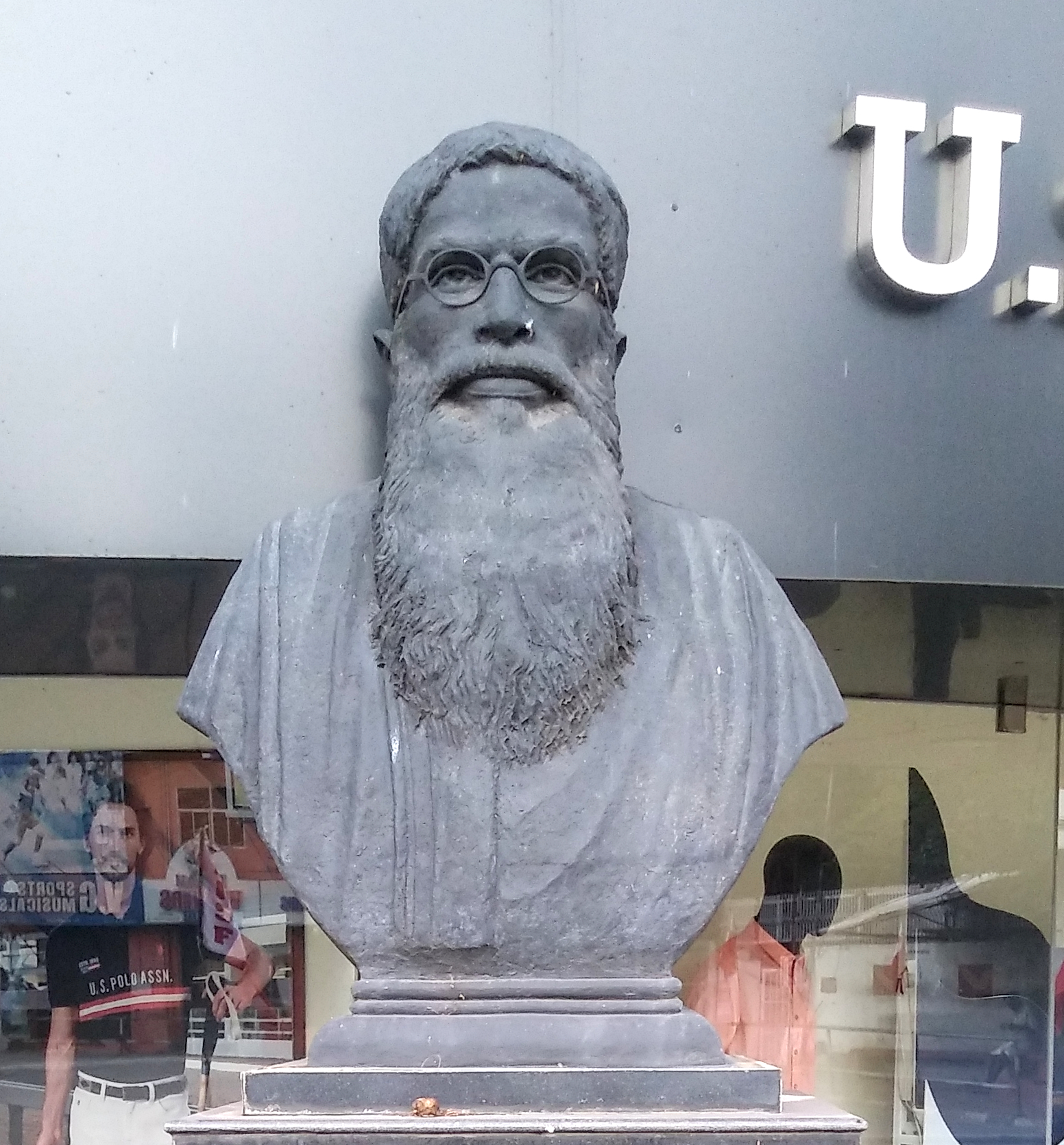
- Statue of Balakrishna Pillai at Pulimoodu junction, Thiruvananthapuram
- Born: 23 April 1889; Thampanoor, Thiruvananthapuram, Kerala, India
- Died: 18 December 1960 (aged 71)
- Occupations: Writer, literary critic, journalist
- Spouse: Madavanapparambil Gauri Amma
- Relatives: Akathoot Damodaran Kartha (father); Parvathy Amma (mother)
- Writing career
- Notable works: Kesariyude Lokangal; Navalokam; Outlines of the Proto-Historic Chronology of Western Asia; Sankethika Nirupanangal Sahitya Nirupanangal; Rupamanjari

Akathoot Balakrishna Pillai (1889–1960), better known as Kesari Balakrishna Pillai, was a Malayalam writer, art and literary critic and journalist, considered by many as one of the most influential thinkers of modern Kerala. He was the eponymous founder of the newspaper, Kesari and was one of the three major figures in modern Malayalam literary criticism, along with Joseph Mundassery and M. P. Paul. Besides works such as Kesariyude Lokangal, Navalokam, Sankethika Nirupanangal Sahitya Nirupanangal, Rupamanjari, he also wrote a text in English under the title, Outlines of the Proto-Historic Chronology of Western Asia.

== Biography ==
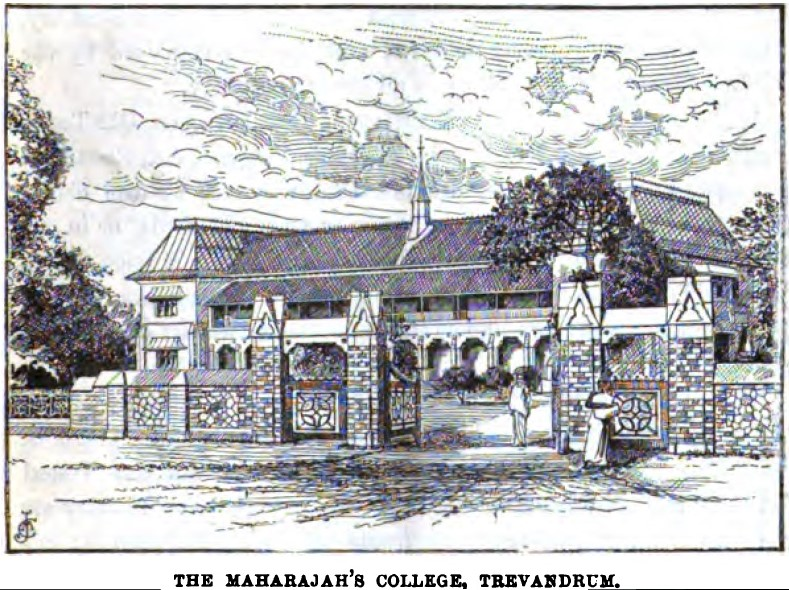
The Maharajah's College, Trivandrum (Thiruvananthapuram) - Kesari's alma mater

A. Balakrishna Pillai was born on 13 April 1889 to Akathoot Damodaran Kartha of Pulickal Mele Veedu family of Thampanoor, Thiruvananthapuram and Parvathy Amma, in the south Indian state of Kerala. His early schooling was in Thiruvananthapuram and the neighbouring district of Kollam as his father, a scholar, divorced his mother. After matriculating from Maharaja's High School, Thiruvananthapuram in 1904, he graduated in History in 1908 from the Maharaja's College, Thiruvananthapuram (the present-day University College Thiruvananthapuram) and started his career as a tutor at the Government College for Women, Thiruvananthapuram, then known as Maharaja's Women's College. Later, he also worked as a tutor at his alma mater, Maharaja's College. While working, he continued studies in law and graduated with first class in 1913 to pursue a legal career which, however, was short lived as he was not successful as a lawyer.

Balakrishna Pillai, by this time, had already started writing, primarily at the behest of a few publishers and this gave him the opportunity to get acquainted with Kalakkunnath Raman Menon, who ran a weekly, Samadharshi. On Menon's invitation, he assumed the editorship of the weekly, which had a weekly circulation of 300,000, on 14 May 1922. However, his stay at the weekly did not last long as Pillai's editorials were too strong-worded for the ownership of the weekly and he resigned the post on 19 June 1926. Subsequently, he started a press, Sharada Press, out of donations from the public and founded a newspaper, Prabhodhakan, which had to be shut down after three months of operation as the authorities revoked the licence of the newspaper; Pillai was imposed a fine of ₹ 200 as fine for contempt of court.

After a week of the closure of Prabhodhakan, Pillai started Kesari as a weekly. (Note: Vengayil Kunhiraman Nayanar also wrote under the pseudonym, Kesari) He ran the publication for four years until it was discontinued due to mounting debts in April 1935; he had to sell Sharada Press to pay off the debts. The next seven years were spent in Thiruvananthapuram, pursuing a literary career and in 1942, he moved to North Paravur in Ernakulam, the native place of his wife. Later, he moved to Kottayam in 1957 when he started having physical illnesses.

Balakrishna Pillai was married to Madavanapparambil Gauri Amma, whom he married in 1917. He died on 18 December 1960, at the age of 71.

== Legacy ==
=== Contribution to literature, studies of art ===
Pillai, termed by K. Balakrishnan as the Socrates of Kerala, was one of the most influential thinkers from Kerala and was credited with mentoring several writers of his time. He contributed to Malayalam literary criticism through his innovative, interdisciplinary approach, and his writings on art, particularly painting, are regarded as masterpieces. He was one of the first Malayalam literary critics to introduce some of the great works of world literature to Malayalam literature and was a source of inspiration for writers such as Thakazhi Sivasankara Pillai, S. K. Pottekkatt, Vaikom Muhammed Bashir, Kesava Dev and others. He wrote extensively on movements in contemporary European literature and advocated the use of other disciplines like sociology and psychology in literary criticism. He also translated the works of Guy de Maupassant, Balzac, Sigmund Freud, and Charles Darwin, among others. The editorials wrote by Pillai was later compiled as a book and published in 2010 under the title, Kesariyude Lokangal (The Editorials of Kesari).

=== Progressive Arts and Letters Movement ===
By the 1930s the "Jeevat Sahitya Prasthanam" was inaugurated in Malayalam literature by a group of Marxist ideologists and some progressive writers including Pillai, Joseph Mundassery and M. P. Paul. Progressive writers tried to give new direction to Malayalam literature. In an era of Western literary and cultural paradigms, they emphasized the importance of prose fiction in Malayalam and also advocated for realism in literature. Jeevat Sahitya Prasthanam was later known as "Purogamana Sahitya Prasthanam". (Progressive Association for Arts and Letters).

=== Alternative methods of history ===
Pillai helped to solve many puzzles of ancient history. Though many of his theories were rejected during his times by academic intellectuals, his findings about the connection between the present day inhabitants of India with that of Western Asia are acknowledged by the modern history. Though the first Harappan excavations were done during the 1920s, only by the later part of the century did convincing evidence about Aryans migrating to India from Iran and nearby places emerge. However, with his penetrating analyzes, Kesari was able to present this theory decades earlier.

Notable personalities like E. M. S. Namboodiripad and Thakazhi Sivasankara Pillai admitted later that they failed to fully understand Kesari's writing on history when he was alive and acknowledged that they could understand it only decades later. Many other notable personalities thought Kesari was "eccentric" partly because it was too incomprehensible for them to take, and also because he used unconventional methods for understanding history. P. Govinda Pillai commented that Kesari, who otherwise traversed through the blistering spheres of modern thoughts, often aberrated into frivolous anarchism and childishly immature illusions. Academic scholars often failed to take note that, when he actually tried to explore the pre-historical times, there were not enough archaeological evidences unearthed as it is the case today, which could help to throw light on the subject. Some of the modern historians points out today that, though one has to be careful while taking clues from myths, historians can not totally ignore the indications given by the myths and legends.

Pillai emphasized the importance of using alternative methods to understand pre-historic times and pointed out that comparable legends and myths obtaining in the regions concerned are more useful than archaeological, epigraphical, and literary sources.

Pillai said that 'Yudhishtira' in Hindu mythology was the same as the Sumerian 'Udultur' and identified the 'Prachinabarhis' of the Puranas with 'Erystheus' of the Greek legend; he was convinced that 'Cakshusha Manu' was the same as the Greek Danaus of Argos and the Utnapishtim of Babylon. For him, the "protohistoric Olympiad era can be identified with the Kali or Agasthya era" and "Hercules was the Narasimha incarnation of Vishnu." If the chronology of all civilisations in the Old World had the same basis, their historical geography, too, rested on the same foundations. So also, in speaking about the "protohistoric" states, the author believes that the ancestors of "the Greeks and the Romans, of the Indians and Persians, of the Chinese and Tibetans, and of the Malays and Polynesians" were the same. Dvaraka was the same as Athens, Kosala was Kish, Mithila was Corinth, and Magadha was Nineveh.

=== Journalism ===
Pillai first worked as an editor of Samadarshi and later started his own journal, Prabodhakan, by collecting funds from within and outside of India. When Prabodhakan was banned, he founded and published Kesari, an important weekly discussing politics and literature. Through the columns of Kesari, he fought against the formidable autocracy of the Dewan of the erstwhile princely state of Travancore. Kesari was also banned by the government because of its unrelenting criticisms against the misdeeds of Government.

== E.M.S Namboodiripad and Kesari Balakrishna Pillai ==
Kesari was considered to be one of the visionaries of the Progressive Movement of Arts and Letters of Kerala. However, later serious differences of opinion emerged between full-time Communist Party activists and other personalities, namely Kesari and Joseph Mundassery. In this context, E. M. S. Namboodiripad called Kesari a "Petit-Bourgeois intellectual", which later he corrected. It was T. P. Sukumaran who wrote letter to Namboodiripad requesting that he re-consider his views about Kesari and his intellectual positions. Namboodiripad replied back saying he had to once again read old writings before stating anything on that subject. Later Namboodiripad publicly acknowledged the failure of Communist Party leadership in Kerala in rightly understanding the greatness of Kesari. Namboodiripad also acknowledged some of the earlier misconceptions of the Communist Party with respect to the Progressive Literature and Arts movement.

== Honours ==
The Government of Kerala commissioned a statue of Pillai in Thiruvananthapuram in connection with the 50th death anniversary of his death in 2010. Two public halls, Kesari Memorial Municipal Town Hall in North Paravur and Kesari Memorial Hall at Pulimoodu in Thiruvananthapuram have been named after him. A museum has also been set up at his residence in North Paravur, named Kesari Balakrishna Pillai Memorial Museum. The 50th death anniversary function was marked by a seminar held at Kesari Memorial Hall, Pulimood when two books on Pillai, Kesari A Balakrishna Pillai - Karmaveeryathinte Sooryasobha, and a collection of his writings, compiled by M. N. Vijayan. were published. Another seminar, entitled Kesariyude Lokam, was organised by the Kerala Lalithakala Akademi in Thrissur. The life of Pillai was the subject of two documentaries, the first by Rajiv Vijay Raghavan and the other, titled Kesari, by K. R. Manoj; the latter work is being exhibited on a permanent loop at Kesari Balakrishna Pillai Memorial Museum.

== Bibliography ==
=== Essays and criticism ===
- Navalokam (The New World)
- Pillai, Kesari Balakrishna (2009). Outlines of the proto-historic chronology of Western Asia : with some historic chronology of ancient India appended to it. Thiruvananthapuram: Dept. of Publications, University of Kerala. ISBN 978-8186397961. OCLC 553376729.
- Sankethika Nirupanangal Sahitya Nirupanangal
- Rupamanjari
- Novel Prasthanangal
- Vijayan, M. N., ed. (2010). Kesariyude Mukhaprasangangal. DC Books. p. 236. Archived from the original on 24 February 2019.
- Kesari Balakrishna Pillai (1984). Charitrathinte Adiverukal. Kerala Sahitya Akademi. ISBN 9788176902496.
- Kesari A. Balakrishnapilla (1992). Charithra Padanangal (in Malayalam) (0 ed.). Bamsuri Books.
- Kesari A. Balakrishnapilla (1986). Kesariyude Sahityavimarshanangal (in Malayalam) (0 ed.). Sahithya Pravathaka Sahakarana.
- Kesari A. Balakrishnapilla (1985). Charithrathinte Adiverukal (in Malayalam) (0 ed.). Kerala Sahithya Accademi.
- Kesariyude Lokangal - Edited by M. N. Vijayan

=== Translations ===
- Love by Guy de Maupassant
- Ghosts by Henrik Ibsen

=== Works on Kesari ===
- K. M. George (1989). Kesari Balakrishna Pillai. Sahitya Akademi.
- K. Balakrishnan (2014). Kesari Balakrishna Pillai: Keralathile Socrates. Green Books. Archived from the original on 24 February 2019.
- Multiple Authors (2010). Kesari Balakrishna Pillai: Karmaveeryathinte Sooryasobha. Government of Kerala. Archived from the original on 24 February 2019.
- M. N. Vijayan (2010). Kesariyude Charithra Gaveshanangal (3 volumes) (in Malayalam) (1 ed.). State Institute of Languages, Kerala.
- Kesari A Balakrishnapilla (1982). Nava Kerala Shilpikal: Kesari. A. Balakrishna Pillai - BIOGRAPHICAL STUDIES (in Malayalam). Kerala History Association.
