= Pir Bazar =

City in Gilan province, Iran

Pir Bazar Persian: پیربازار
- City
- Location within Iran
- Coordinates: 37°20′36″N 49°32′54″E
- Country: Iran
- Province: Gilan
- County: Rasht
- District: Central
- Established as a city: 2020

Population (2016)
  - Total: 5,373
- Time zone: UTC+3:30 (IRST)

Pir Bazar (Persian: پیربازار) is a city in the Central District of Rasht County, Gilan province, Iran. As a village, it was the capital of Pir Bazar Rural District until its capital was transferred to the village of Mobarakabad.

== Demographics ==
=== Population ===
At the 2006 census, Pir Bazar's population was below the reporting threshold. The following census in 2011 counted 405 people in 119 households.

After the census, the following villages merged with Pir Bazar: Galesh Gacheh, Gerakeh, Rajakol, Rasteh Kenar, Shams-e Bijar, Siah Rud Kenar, and Sukhteh Luleh.

The 2016 census measured the population of the village as 5,373 people in 1,761 households. It was the most populous village in its rural district.

Pir Bazar was converted to a city in 2020.
