= Takhteh Pol, Iran =

Takhteh Pol تخته پل
- Village
- Location within Iran
- Coordinates: 31°11′58″N 61°44′19″E
- Country: Iran
- Province: Sistan and Baluchestan
- County: Hirmand
- Bakhsh: Qorqori
- Rural District: Qorqori

Population (2006)
  - Total: 163
- Time zone: UTC+3:30 (IRST)
  - Summer (DST): UTC+4:30 (IRDT)

Takhteh Pol (Persian: تخته پل; also known as Takht-e Pol, Takht Pol, and Takht Pūr) is a village in Qorqori Rural District, Qorqori District, Hirmand County, Sistan and Baluchestan Province, Iran. At the 2006 census, its population was 163, in 33 families.
