= Pir Bazar Rural District =

Rural district in Gilan province, Iran

Pir Bazar Rural District Persian: دهستان پيربازار
- Rural District
- Location within Iran
- Coordinates: 37°20′N 49°33′E
- Country: Iran
- Province: Gilan
- County: Rasht
- District: Central
- Established: 1987
- Capital: Mobarakabad

Population (2016)
  - Total: 16,609
- Time zone: UTC+3:30 (IRST)

Pir Bazar Rural District (Persian: دهستان پيربازار) is in the Central District of Rasht County, Gilan province, Iran. Its capital is the village of Mobarakabad. The previous capital of the rural district was the village of Pir Bazar, now a city.

== Demographics ==
=== Population ===
At the time of the 2006 census, the rural district's population was 21,374 in 5,845 households. There were 16,958 inhabitants in 5,163 households at the following census of 2011. The 2016 census measured the population of the rural district as 16,609 in 5,542 households. The most populous of its 18 villages was Pir Bazar (now a city), with 5,373 people.

=== Villages in the rural district ===
- Alman
- Alvian
- Bijar Khaleh
- Feyzabad
- Galesh Kheyl
- Jur Deh
- Kafteh Rud
- Kama Kol
- Khanaf Cheh
- Mangu Deh
- Mobarakabad
- Mohammadabad
- Pastak
- Pileh Darbon
- Pir Deh
- Siah Estalakh
- Tash
