= Central District (Rasht County) =

District in Gilan province, Iran

Central District (Rasht County) Persian: بخش مرکزی شهرستان رشت
- District
- Location within Iran
- Coordinates: 37°12′N 49°35′E
- Country: Iran
- Province: Gilan
- County: Rasht
- Capital: Rasht

Population (2016)
  - Total: 740,985
- Time zone: UTC+3:30 (IRST)

The Central District of Rasht County (Persian: بخش مرکزی شهرستان رشت) is in Gilan province, Iran. Its capital is the city of Rasht.

== History ==
The village of Pir Bazar was converted to a city in 2020.

== Demographics ==
=== Population ===
At the time of the 2006 National Census, the district's population was 624,507 in 180,185 households. The following census in 2011 counted 696,576 people in 221,057 households. The 2016 census measured the population of the district as 740,985 inhabitants in 246,759 households.

=== Administrative divisions ===
Central District (Rasht County) Population
Administrative Divisions	2006	2011	2016
Howmeh RD	20,703	20,664	20,449
Lakan RD	21,251	11,480	15,209
Pasikhan RD	10,018	7,523	8,723
Pir Bazar RD	21,374	16,958	16,609
Pir Bazar (city) (Note: Became a city after the 2016 census)			
Rasht (city)	551,161	639,951	679,995
Total	624,507	696,576	740,985
RD = Rural District
