= Rashtabad, Gilan =

Neighborhood in Gilan province, Iran

Rashtabad Persian: رشت آباد
- Neighborhood
- Location within Iran
- Coordinates: 37°15′06″N 49°50′15″E
- Country: Iran
- Province: Gilan
- County: Rasht
- District: Kuchesfahan
- City: Luleman

Population (2011)
  - Total: 1,628
- Time zone: UTC+3:30 (IRST)

Rashtabad (Persian: رشت آباد) (Note: Also romanized as Rashtābād and Reshtabad) is a neighborhood in the city of Luleman in Kuchesfahan District of Rasht County, Gilan province, Iran.

== Demographics ==
=== Population ===
At the time of the 2006 National Census, Rashtabad's population was 1,728 in 538 households, when it was a village in Luleman Rural District. The following census in 2011 counted 1,628 people in 614 households.

In 2009, the villages of Chelak, Karbasdeh, Mobarakabad, Rashtabad, and Rudbaraki merged with the city of Luleman.
