= Deh Boneh =

Deh Boneh (Persian: ده بنه) may refer to:

- Deh Boneh, Rasht, Gilan Province
- Deh Boneh, Siahkal, Gilan Province
- Deh Boneh, Kermanshah
- Deh Boneh, Kurdistan

== See also ==
- Deh Baneh (disambiguation)
