= Rudbaraki =

Neighborhood in Gilan province, Iran

Rudbaraki Persian: رودبارکی
- Neighborhood
- Location within Iran
- Coordinates: 37°15′43″N 49°48′26″E
- Country: Iran
- Province: Gilan
- County: Rasht
- District: Kuchesfahan
- City: Luleman

Population (2011)
  - Total: 899
- Time zone: UTC+3:30 (IRST)

Rudbaraki (Persian: رودبارکی) (Note: Also Romanized as Rūdbār Key and Rūdbārakī) is a neighborhood in the city of Luleman in Kuchesfahan District of Rasht County, Gilan province, Iran.

== Demographics ==
=== Population ===
At the time of the 2006 National Census, Rudbaraki's population was 1,095 in 335 households, when it was a village in Luleman Rural District. The following census in 2011 counted 899 people in 292 households.

In 2009, the villages of Chelak, Karbasdeh, Mobarakabad, Rashtabad, and Rudbaraki merged with the city of Luleman.
