= Chelak, Rasht =

Neighborhood in Gilan province, Iran

Chelak Persian: چلک
- Neighborhood
- Location within Iran
- Coordinates: 37°16′18″N 49°49′26″E
- Country: Iran
- Province: Gilan
- County: Rasht
- District: Kuchesfahan
- City: Luleman

Population (2011)
  - Total: 256
- Time zone: UTC+3:30 (IRST)

Chelak (Persian: چلک) is a neighborhood in the city of Luleman in Kuchesfahan District of Rasht County, Gilan province, Iran.

== Demographics ==
=== Population ===
At the time of the 2006 National Census, Chelak's population was 304 in 91 households, when it was a village in Luleman Rural District. The following census in 2011 counted 256 people in 85 households.

In 2009, the villages of Chelak, Karbasdeh, Mobarakabad, Rashtabad, and Rudbaraki merged with the city of Luleman.
