= Karbasdeh =

Neighborhood in Gilan province, Iran

Karbasdeh Persian: كرباسده
- Neighborhood
- Location within Iran
- Coordinates: 37°16′07″N 49°47′50″E
- Country: Iran
- Province: Gilan
- County: Rasht
- District: Kuchesfahan
- City: Luleman

Population (2011)
  - Total: 1,186
- Time zone: UTC+3:30 (IRST)

Karbasdeh (Persian: كرباسده) (Note: Also romanized as Karbāsdeh; also known as Garbāsdeh and Garbazde) is a neighborhood in the city of Luleman in Kuchesfahan District of Rasht County, Gilan province, Iran.

== Demographics ==
=== Population ===
At the time of the 2006 National Census, Karbasdeh's population was 1,203 in 328 households, when it was a village in Luleman Rural District. The following census in 2011 counted 1,186 people in 404 households.

In 2009, the villages of Chelak, Karbasdeh, Mobarakabad, Rashtabad, and Rudbaraki merged with the city of Luleman.
