= Mobarakabad, Kuchesfahan =

Neighborhood in Gilan province, Iran

Mobarakabad Persian: مبارک‌آباد
- Neighborhood
- Location within Iran
- Coordinates: 37°16′15″N 49°49′48″E
- Country: Iran
- Province: Gilan
- County: Rasht
- District: Kuchesfahan
- City: Luleman

Population (2011)
  - Total: 288
- Time zone: UTC+3:30 (IRST)

Mobarakabad (Persian: مبارک‌آباد) (Note: Also romanized as Mobārakābād; also known as Mobark Abade Koochesfehan) is a neighborhood in the city of Luleman in Kuchesfahan District of Rasht County, Gilan province, Iran.

== Demographics ==
=== Population ===
At the time of the 2006 National Census, Mobarakabad's population was 358 in 110 households, when it was a village in Luleman Rural District. The following census in 2011 counted 288 people in 102 households.

In 2009, the villages of Chelak, Karbasdeh, Mobarakabad, Rashtabad, and Rudbaraki merged with the city of Luleman.
