= Geraku =

Geraku, Garaku (Persian: گراكو, Japanese: 雅楽 or 画楽) may refer to:

- Geraku, Fuman, Gilan Province
- Garaku, Rasht, Gilan Province
- Geraku, Mazandaran
- Garaku Toshusai, a pen name of Takashi Nagasaki
- Garaku Utagawa, a fictional character in Ayakashi Triangle
