= Su Kacha =

Village in Gilan province, Iran

Su Kacha Persian: سوكاچا
- Village
- Location within Iran
- Coordinates: 37°09′17″N 49°41′20″E
- Country: Iran
- Province: Gilan
- County: Rasht
- District: Sangar
- Rural District: Eslamabad

Population (2016)
  - Total: 668
- Time zone: UTC+3:30 (IRST)

Su Kacha (Persian: سوكاچا) (Note: Also romanized as Sū Kāchā; also known as Sekāchel) is a village in Eslamabad Rural District of Sangar District in Rasht County, Gilan province, Iran.

== Demographics ==
=== Population ===
At the time of the 2006 National Census, the village's population was 401 in 112 households. The following census in 2011 counted 377 people in 124 households. The 2016 census measured the population of the village as 668 people in 221 households.
