= Rudkol =

Village in Gilan province, Iran

Rudkol Persian: رودكل
- Village
- Location within Iran
- Coordinates: 37°16′01″N 49°45′53″E
- Country: Iran
- Province: Gilan
- County: Rasht
- District: Kuchesfahan
- Rural District: Kenar Sar

Population (2016)
  - Total: 115
- Time zone: UTC+3:30 (IRST)

Rudkol (Persian: رودكل) (Note: Also romanized as Rood Kal and Rūdkol; also known as Rud-Gul and Rūd Kad) is a village in Kenar Sar Rural District of Kuchesfahan District in Rasht County, Gilan province, Iran.

== Demographics ==
=== Population ===
At the time of the 2006 National Census, the village's population was 139 in 41 households. The following census in 2011 counted 117 people in 34 households. The 2016 census measured the population of the village as 115 people in 39 households.
