= Sarvandan, Gilan =

Village in Gilan province, Iran

Sarvandan Persian: سروندان
- Village
- Location within Iran
- Coordinates: 37°11′56″N 49°42′48″E
- Country: Iran
- Province: Gilan
- County: Rasht
- District: Sangar
- Rural District: Sangar

Population (2016)
  - Total: 1,772
- Time zone: UTC+3:30 (IRST)

Sarvandan (Persian: سروندان) (Note: Also romanized as Sarvandān and Sorvandān; also known as Surbandan) is a village in Sangar Rural District of Sangar District in Rasht County, Gilan province, Iran.

== Demographics ==
=== Population ===
At the time of the 2006 National Census, the village's population was 1,898 in 516 households. The following census in 2011 counted 1,797 people in 562 households. The 2016 census measured the population of the village as 1,772 people in 621 households.
