= Katik Lahijan =

Village in Gilan province, Iran

Katik Lahijan Persian: کتیک لاهيجان
- Village
- Location within Iran
- Coordinates: 37°15′13″N 49°47′02″E
- Country: Iran
- Province: Gilan
- County: Rasht
- District: Kuchesfahan
- Rural District: Luleman

Population (2016)
  - Total: 512
- Time zone: UTC+3:30 (IRST)

Katik Lahijan (Persian: کتیک لاهیجان) (Note: Also romanized as Katīk Lāhījān and Katīk-e Lāhījān; also known as Katak) is a village in Luleman Rural District of Kuchesfahan District in Rasht County, Gilan province, Iran.

== Demographics ==
=== Population ===
At the time of the 2006 National Census, the village's population was 807 in 234 households. The following census in 2011 counted 791 people in 271 households. The 2016 census measured the population of the village as 512 people in 181 households.
