= Varazgah =

Village in Gilan province, Iran

Varazgah Persian: ورازگاه
- Village
- Location within Iran
- Coordinates: 37°12′42″N 49°40′10″E
- Country: Iran
- Province: Gilan
- County: Rasht
- District: Sangar
- Rural District: Sangar

Population (2016)
  - Total: 560
- Time zone: UTC+3:30 (IRST)

Varazgah (Persian: ورازگاه) (Note: Also romanized as Varāzgāh) is a village in Sangar Rural District of Sangar District in Rasht County, Gilan province, Iran.

== Demographics ==
=== Population ===
At the time of the 2006 National Census, the village's population was 559 in 156 households. The following census in 2011 counted 601 people in 190 households. The 2016 census measured the population of the village as 560 people in 176 households.
