= Talem Seh Shanbeh =

Village in Gilan province, Iran

Talem Seh Shanbeh Persian: طالم سه‌شنبه
- Village
- Location within Iran
- Coordinates: 37°09′40″N 49°40′55″E
- Country: Iran
- Province: Gilan
- County: Rasht
- District: Sangar
- Rural District: Eslamabad

Population (2016)
  - Total: 2,687
- Time zone: UTC+3:30 (IRST)

Talem Seh Shanbeh (Persian: طالم سه‌شنبه) (Note: Also romanized as Tālem Seh Shanbeh; also known as Seh Shanbeh, Sishambeh, and Sishkhambekh) is a village in Eslamabad Rural District of Sangar District in Rasht County, Gilan province, Iran.

== Demographics ==
=== Population ===
At the time of the 2006 National Census, the village's population was 3,007 in 880 households. The following census in 2011 counted 2,654 people in 850 households. The 2016 census measured the population of the village as 2,687 people in 909 households. It was the most populous village in its rural district.
