= Aynehvar =

Village in Gilan province, Iran

Aynehvar Persian: اينه ور
- Village
- Location within Iran
- Coordinates: 37°08′35″N 49°43′59″E
- Country: Iran
- Province: Gilan
- County: Rasht
- District: Sangar
- Rural District: Eslamabad

Population (2016)
  - Total: 410
- Time zone: UTC+3:30 (IRST)

Aynehvar (Persian: اينه ور) (Note: Also romanized as Āynehvar; also known as ‘Aynevar and Eynaver) is a village in Eslamabad Rural District of Sangar District in Rasht County, Gilan province, Iran.

== Demographics ==
=== Population ===
At the time of the 2006 National Census, the village's population was 465 in 131 households. The following census in 2011 counted 423 people in 138 households. The 2016 census measured the population of the village as 410 people in 147 households.
