= Ahmad Sara =

Ahmad Sara or Ahmadsara (Persian: احمدسرا) may refer to:

- Ahmad Sara, Gilan
- Ahmad Sara, Shaft, Gilan Province
- Ahmad Sara, Mazandaran
