= Vishka Nanak =

Village in Gilan province, Iran

Vishka Nanak Persian: ويشكا ننك
- Village
- Location within Iran
- Coordinates: 37°14′14″N 49°43′32″E
- Country: Iran
- Province: Gilan
- County: Rasht
- District: Sangar
- Rural District: Sangar

Population (2016)
  - Total: 1,965
- Time zone: UTC+3:30 (IRST)

Vishka Nanak (Persian: ويشكاننك) (Note: Also romanized as Vīshkā Nanak; also known as Veshekha and Vīshkā) is a village in, and the capital of, Sangar Rural District in Sangar District of Rasht County, Gilan province, Iran.

== Demographics ==
=== Population ===
At the time of the 2006 National Census, the village's population was 1,973 in 551 households. The following census in 2011 counted 1,960 people in 654 households. The 2016 census measured the population of the village as 1,965 people in 650 households. It was the most populous village in its rural district.
