= Khalaki =

Village in Gilan province, Iran

Khalaki Persian: خالکی
- Village
- Location within Iran
- Coordinates: 37°17′56″N 49°49′42″E
- Country: Iran
- Province: Gilan
- County: Rasht
- District: Kuchesfahan
- Rural District: Luleman

Population (2016)
  - Total: 204
- Time zone: UTC+3:30 (IRST)

Khalaki (Persian: خالکی) (Note: Also romanized as Khālakī; also known as Khālak and Khel’ki) is a village in Luleman Rural District of Kuchesfahan District in Rasht County, Gilan province, Iran.

== Demographics ==
=== Population ===
At the time of the 2006 National Census, the village's population was 268 in 95 households. The following census in 2011 counted 178 people in 66 households. The 2016 census measured the population of the village as 204 people in 80 households.
