= Kadu Sara =

Village in Gilan province, Iran

Kadu Sara Persian: كدوسرا
- Village
- Location within Iran
- Coordinates: 37°13′20″N 49°45′39″E
- Country: Iran
- Province: Gilan
- County: Rasht
- District: Sangar
- Rural District: Sangar

Population (2016)
  - Total: 930
- Time zone: UTC+3:30 (IRST)

Kadu Sara (Persian: كدوسرا) (Note: Also romanized as Kadoo Sara, Kadū Sarā, and Kedu-Sara; also known as Khājeh Sarā) is a village in Sangar Rural District of Sangar District in Rasht County, Gilan province, Iran.

== Demographics ==
=== Population ===
At the time of the 2006 National Census, the village's population was 1,241 in 369 households. The following census in 2011 counted 1,139 people in 393 households. The 2016 census measured the population of the village as 930 people in 304 households.
