= Mamudan =

Village in Gilan province, Iran

Mamudan Persian: مامودان
- Village
- Location within Iran
- Coordinates: 37°19′08″N 49°49′36″E
- Country: Iran
- Province: Gilan
- County: Rasht
- District: Kuchesfahan
- Rural District: Kenar Sar

Population (2016)
  - Total: 329
- Time zone: UTC+3:30 (IRST)

Mamudan (Persian: مامودان) (Note: Also romanized as Māmūdān) is a village in Kenar Sar Rural District of Kuchesfahan District in Rasht County, Gilan province, Iran.

== Demographics ==
=== Population ===
At the time of the 2006 National Census, the village's population was 403 in 122 households. The following census in 2011 counted 336 people in 121 households. The 2016 census measured the population of the village as 329 people in 124 households.
