= Nasrollahabad, Rasht =

Village in Gilan province, Iran

Nasrollahabad Persian: نصراله اباد
- Village
- Location within Iran
- Coordinates: 37°11′06″N 49°46′53″E
- Country: Iran
- Province: Gilan
- County: Rasht
- District: Sangar
- Rural District: Eslamabad

Population (2016)
  - Total: 288
- Time zone: UTC+3:30 (IRST)

Nasrollahabad (Persian: نصراله اباد) (Note: Also romanized as Naşrollāhābād; also known as Naşrābād) is a village in Eslamabad Rural District of Sangar District in Rasht County, Gilan province, Iran.

== Demographics ==
=== Population ===
At the time of the 2006 National Census, the village's population was 353 in 113 households. The following census in 2011 counted 300 people in 106 households. The 2016 census measured the population of the village as 288 people in 103 households.
