= Jurbijarkol =

Village in Gilan province, Iran

Jurbijarkol Persian: جوربيجاركل
- Village
- Location within Iran
- Coordinates: 37°17′07″N 49°47′03″E
- Country: Iran
- Province: Gilan
- County: Rasht
- District: Kuchesfahan
- Rural District: Kenar Sar

Population (2016)
  - Total: 367
- Time zone: UTC+3:30 (IRST)

Jurbijarkol (Persian: جوربيجاركل) (Note: Also known as Dzhodzherkul, Jojarkul, Jowbejārkol, Jowbījārkol, Jowjarkūl, Jūbījārkol, and Jūbjārkol) is a village in Kenar Sar Rural District of Kuchesfahan District in Rasht County, Gilan province, Iran.

== Demographics ==
=== Population ===
At the time of the 2006 National Census, the village's population was 357 in 108 households. The following census in 2011 counted 376 people in 127 households. The 2016 census measured the population of the village as 367 people in 131 households.
