= Hashkova =

Village in Gilan province, Iran

Hashkova Persian: حشكوا
- Village
- Location within Iran
- Coordinates: 37°13′33″N 49°45′09″E
- Country: Iran
- Province: Gilan
- County: Rasht
- District: Kuchesfahan
- Rural District: Balasbaneh

Population (2016)
  - Total: 881
- Time zone: UTC+3:30 (IRST)

Hashkova (Persian: حشكوا) (Note: Also romanized as Hashkava and Ḩashkovā; also known as Ḩashgevā and Khashkava) is a village in Balasbaneh Rural District of Kuchesfahan District in Rasht County, Gilan province, Iran.

== Demographics ==
=== Population ===
At the time of the 2006 National Census, the village's population was 1,078 in 316 households. The following census in 2011 counted 1,044 people in 345 households. The 2016 census measured the population of the village as 881 people in 315 households.
