= Ebrahim Sara =

Village in Gilan province, Iran

Ebrahim Sara Persian: ابراهيم سرا
- Village
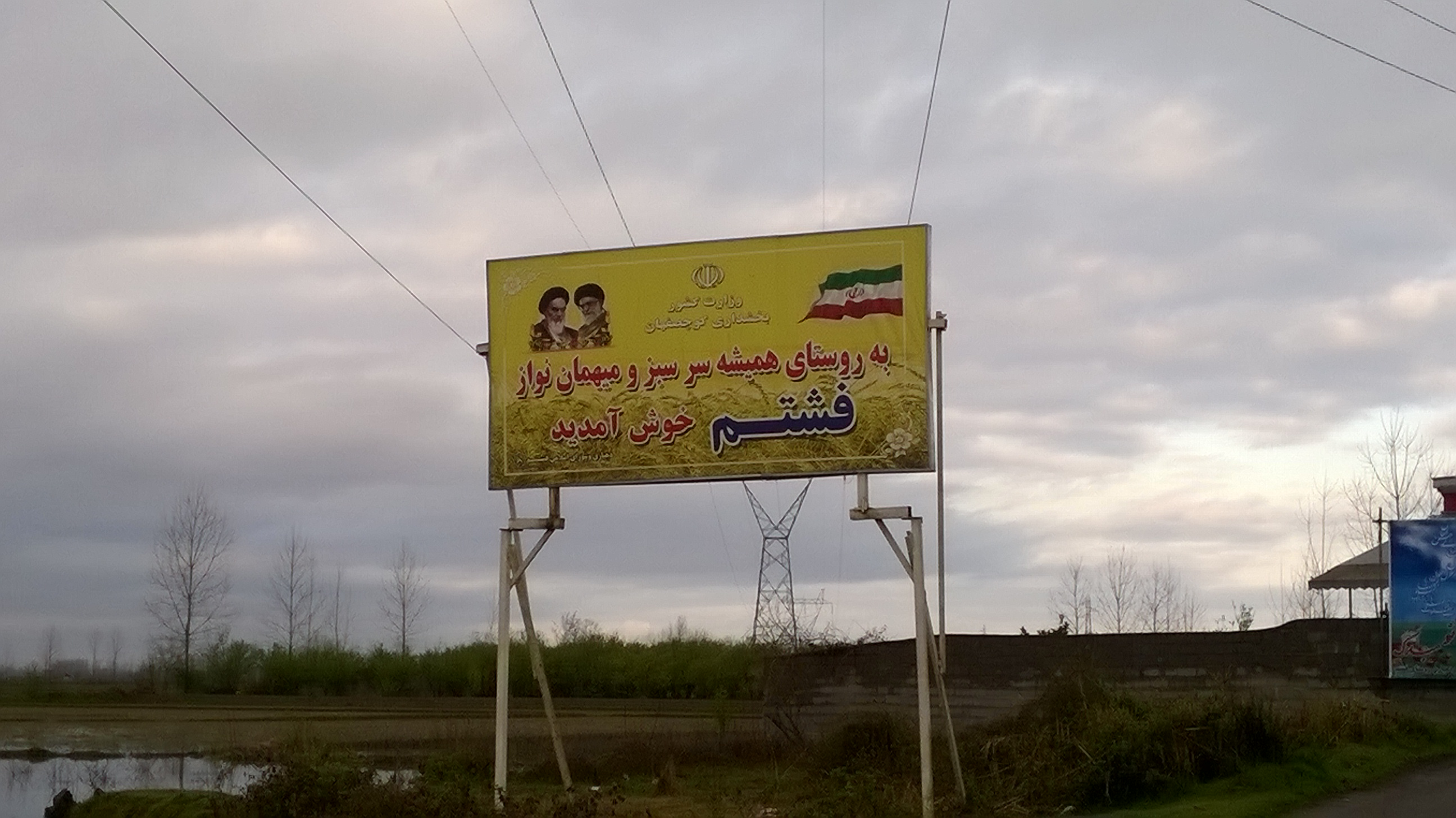
- Entrance to the village of Foshtom

- Location within Iran
- Coordinates: 37°15′42″N 49°53′13″E
- Country: Iran
- Province: Gilan
- County: Rasht
- District: Kuchesfahan
- Rural District: Luleman

Population (2016)
  - Total: 932
- Time zone: UTC+3:30 (IRST)

Ebrahim Sara (Persian: ابراهيم سرا) (Note: Also romanized as Ebrāhīm Sarā and Ibrahimsara; also known as Ebrāhīmābād and Ibragimsara) is a village in Luleman Rural District of Kuchesfahan District in Rasht County, Gilan province, Iran.

== Demographics ==
=== Population ===
At the time of the 2006 National Census, the village's population was 1,121 in 322 households. The following census in 2011 counted 929 people in 317 households. The 2016 census measured the population of the village as 932 people in 339 households.
