= Kenar Sar =

Village in Gilan province, Iran

Kenar Sar Persian: كنارسر
- Village
- Location within Iran
- Coordinates: 37°18′35″N 49°47′44″E
- Country: Iran
- Province: Gilan
- County: Rasht
- District: Kuchesfahan
- Rural District: Kenar Sar

Population (2016)
  - Total: 1,369
- Time zone: UTC+3:30 (IRST)

Kenar Sar (Persian: كنارسر) (Note: Also romanized as Kenār Sar; also known as Kenar Sare Kooch Esfahan, Kenār Sīr, Kenārehsar, Kinārehsar, and Kinerser) is a village in, and the capital of, Kenar Sar Rural District in Kuchesfahan District of Rasht County, Gilan province, Iran.

== Demographics ==
=== Population ===
At the time of the 2006 National Census, the village's population was 1,578 in 469 households. The following census in 2011 counted 1,453 people in 504 households. The 2016 census measured the population of the village as 1,369 people in 497 households.
