= Baz Qaleh =

Baz Qaleh (Persian: بازقلعه) may refer to:

- Baz Qaleh-ye Akbar
- Baz Qaleh-ye Malek
