= Feshkecheh =

Village in Gilan province, Iran

Feshkecheh Persian: فشكچه
- Village
- Location within Iran
- Coordinates: 37°17′23″N 49°43′26″E
- Country: Iran
- Province: Gilan
- County: Rasht
- District: Kuchesfahan
- Rural District: Balasbaneh

Population (2016)
  - Total: 477
- Time zone: UTC+3:30 (IRST)

Feshkecheh (Persian: فشكچه) (Note: Also romanized as Fashkacheh and Feshkacheh; also known as Fashkeh and Feshke) is a village in Balasbaneh Rural District of Kuchesfahan District in Rasht County, Gilan province, Iran.

== Demographics ==
=== Population ===
At the time of the 2006 National Census, the village's population was 524 in 122 households. The following census in 2011 counted 499 people in 155 households. The 2016 census measured the population of the village as 477 people in 159 households.
