= Darreh Posht =

Village in Gilan province, Iran

Darreh Posht Persian: دره پشت
- Village
- Location within Iran
- Coordinates: 37°08′44″N 49°40′06″E
- Country: Iran
- Province: Gilan
- County: Rasht
- District: Sangar
- Rural District: Eslamabad

Population (2016)
  - Total: 398
- Time zone: UTC+3:30 (IRST)

Darreh Posht (Persian: دره پشت) is a village in Eslamabad Rural District of Sangar District in Rasht County, Gilan province, Iran.

== Demographics ==
=== Population ===
At the time of the 2006 National Census, the village's population was 632 in 178 households. The following census in 2011 counted 584 people in 176 households. The 2016 census measured the population of the village as 398 people in 134 households.
