= Foshtom =

Village in Gilan province, Iran

Foshtom Persian: فشتم
- Village
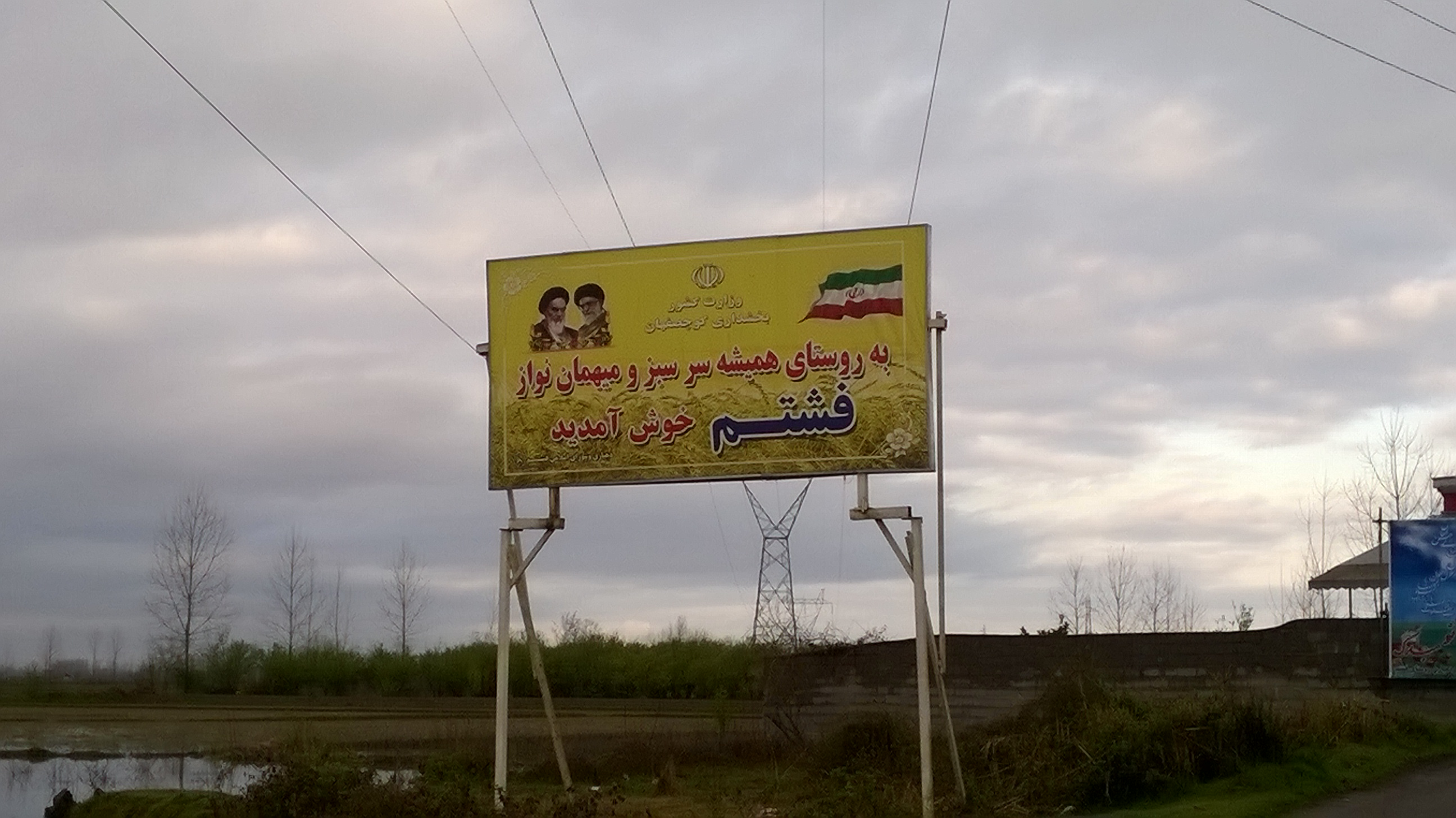
- Entrance to the village of Foshtom

- Location within Iran
- Coordinates: 37°16′43″N 49°51′47″E
- Country: Iran
- Province: Gilan
- County: Rasht
- District: Kuchesfahan
- Rural District: Luleman

Population (2016)
  - Total: 1,636
- Time zone: UTC+3:30 (IRST)

Foshtom (Persian: فشتم) (Note: Also romanized as Fashtam and Feshtam; also known as Fasham and Foshtām) is a village in Luleman Rural District of Kuchesfahan District in Rasht County, Gilan province, Iran.

== Demographics ==
=== Population ===
At the time of the 2006 National Census, the village's population was 2,076 in 629 households. The following census in 2011 counted 1,854 people in 656 households. The 2016 census measured the population of the village as 1,636 people in 602 households. It was the most populous village in its rural district.
