= Pir Musa, Gilan =

Village in Gilan province, Iran

Pir Musa Persian: پيرموسي
- Village
- Location within Iran
- Coordinates: 37°16′23″N 49°46′41″E
- Country: Iran
- Province: Gilan
- County: Rasht
- District: Kuchesfahan
- Rural District: Kenar Sar

Population (2016)
  - Total: 361
- Time zone: UTC+3:30 (IRST)

Pir Musa (Persian: پيرموسي) (Note: Also romanized as Pir Moosa and Pīr Mūsá) is a village in Kenar Sar Rural District of Kuchesfahan District in Rasht County, Gilan province, Iran.

== Demographics ==
=== Population ===
At the time of the 2006 National Census, the village's population was 426 in 129 households. The following census in 2011 counted 327 people in 115 households. The 2016 census measured the population of the village as 361 people in 131 households.
