= Kalmarz =

Village in Gilan province, Iran

Kalmarz Persian: كالمرز
- Village
- Location within Iran
- Coordinates: 37°19′09″N 49°45′41″E
- Country: Iran
- Province: Gilan
- County: Rasht
- District: Kuchesfahan
- Rural District: Balasbaneh

Population (2016)
  - Total: 290
- Time zone: UTC+3:30 (IRST)

Kalmarz (Persian: كالمرز) (Note: Also romanized as Kālmarz; also known as Kalmare and Kālmūz) is a village in Balasbaneh Rural District of Kuchesfahan District in Rasht County, Gilan province, Iran.

== Demographics ==
=== Population ===
At the time of the 2006 National Census, the village's population was 348 in 100 households. The following census in 2011 counted 322 people in 98 households. The 2016 census measured the population of the village as 290 people in 93 households.
