= Gurab Sar =

Village in Gilan province, Iran

Gurab Sar Persian: گورابسر
- Village
- Location within Iran
- Coordinates: 37°16′38″N 49°41′42″E
- Country: Iran
- Province: Gilan
- County: Rasht
- District: Kuchesfahan
- Rural District: Balasbaneh

Population (2016)
  - Total: 769
- Time zone: UTC+3:30 (IRST)

Gurab Sar (Persian: گورابسر) (Note: Also romanized as Goorab Sar and Gūrāb Sar; also known as Bāzār-e Gūrābsar) is a village in Balasbaneh Rural District of Kuchesfahan District in Rasht County, Gilan province, Iran.

== Demographics ==
=== Population ===
At the time of the 2006 National Census, the village's population was 1,058 in 291 households. The following census in 2011 counted 1,000 people in 323 households. The 2016 census measured the population of the village as 769 people in 252 households.
