= Tarom Sar =

Village in Gilan province, Iran

Tarom Sar Persian: طارم سر
- Village
- Location within Iran
- Coordinates: 37°17′12″N 49°50′06″E
- Country: Iran
- Province: Gilan
- County: Rasht
- District: Kuchesfahan
- Rural District: Luleman

Population (2016)
  - Total: 965
- Time zone: UTC+3:30 (IRST)

Tarom Sar (Persian: طارم سر) (Note: Also romanized as Ţārom Sar) is a village in Luleman Rural District of Kuchesfahan District in Rasht County, Gilan province, Iran.

== Demographics ==
=== Population ===
At the time of the 2006 National Census, the village's population was 1,260 in 354 households. The following census in 2011 counted 1,095 people in 370 households. The 2016 census measured the population of the village as 965 people in 346 households.
