= Feshtam =

Village in Gilan province, Iran

Feshtam Persian: فشتام
- Village
- Location within Iran
- Country: Iran
- Province: Gilan
- County: Rasht
- District: Sangar
- Rural District: Eslamabad

Population (2016)
  - Total: 267
- Time zone: UTC+3:30 (IRST)

Feshtam (Persian: فشتام) (Note: Also romanized as Feshtām; also known as Feshtām-e Bālā Maḩalleh) is a village in Eslamabad Rural District of Sangar District in Rasht County, Gilan province, Iran.

== Demographics ==
=== Population ===
At the time of the 2006 National Census, the village's population was 387 in 104 households. The following census in 2011 counted 331 people in 104 households. The 2016 census measured the population of the village as 267 people in 85 households.
