= Gilavandan =

Village in Gilan province, Iran

Gilavandan Persian: گيلاوندان
- Village
- Location within Iran
- Coordinates: 37°12′49″N 49°44′01″E
- Country: Iran
- Province: Gilan
- County: Rasht
- District: Sangar
- Rural District: Sangar

Population (2016)
  - Total: 611
- Time zone: UTC+3:30 (IRST)

Gilavandan (Persian: گيلاوندان) (Note: Also romanized as Gīlāvandān; also known as Kīlāvandān) is a village in Sangar Rural District of Sangar District in Rasht County, Gilan province, Iran.

== Demographics ==
=== Population ===
At the time of the 2006 National Census, the village's population was 792 in 214 households. The following census in 2011 counted 640 people in 212 households. The 2016 census measured the population of the village as 611 people in 197 households.
