= Jukul Bandan =

Village in Gilan province, Iran

Jukul Bandan Persian: جوكول بندان
- Village
- Location within Iran
- Coordinates: 37°07′01″N 49°39′38″E
- Country: Iran
- Province: Gilan
- County: Rasht
- District: Sangar
- Rural District: Saravan

Population (2016)
  - Total: 69
- Time zone: UTC+3:30 (IRST)

Jukul Bandan (Persian: جوكول بندان) (Note: Also romanized as Jūkūl Bandān; also known as Jokleh Bandān, Jokol Bandān, Jokolmandān, and Jowkol Bandān) is a village in Saravan Rural District of Sangar District in Rasht County, Gilan province, Iran.

== Demographics ==
=== Population ===
At the time of the 2006 National Census, the village's population was 114 in 29 households. The following census in 2011 counted 95 people in 36 households. The 2016 census measured the population of the village as 69 people in 26 households.
