= Imanabad, Gilan =

Village in Gilan province, Iran

Imanabad Persian: ايمن اباد
- Village
- Location within Iran
- Coordinates: 37°15′15″N 49°44′23″E
- Country: Iran
- Province: Gilan
- County: Rasht
- District: Kuchesfahan
- Rural District: Balasbaneh

Population (2016)
  - Total: 540
- Time zone: UTC+3:30 (IRST)

Imanabad (Persian: ايمن اباد) (Note: Also romanized as Eimanabad, Eymanābād, Īmanābād, and Īmenābād) is a village in Balasbaneh Rural District of Kuchesfahan District in Rasht County, Gilan province, Iran.

== Demographics ==
=== Population ===
At the time of the 2006 National Census, the village's population was 741 in 188 households. The following census in 2011 counted 632 people in 194 households. The 2016 census measured the population of the village as 540 people in 176 households.
