= Jubaneh =

Village in Gilan province, Iran

Jubaneh Persian: جوبنه
- Village
- Location within Iran
- Coordinates: 37°10′01″N 49°43′09″E
- Country: Iran
- Province: Gilan
- County: Rasht
- District: Sangar
- Rural District: Eslamabad

Population (2016)
  - Total: 1,217
- Time zone: UTC+3:30 (IRST)

Jubaneh (Persian: جوبنه) (Note: Also romanized as Joobeneh, Jūbaneh, and Jūboneh; also known as Dzhubane and Jubnaeh) is a village in Eslamabad Rural District of Sangar District in Rasht County, Gilan province, Iran.

== Demographics ==
=== Population ===
At the time of the 2006 National Census, the village's population was 1,407 in 388 households. The following census in 2011 counted 1,386 people in 428 households. The 2016 census measured the population of the village as 1,217 people in 402 households.
