= Deh Baneh =

Deh Baneh (Persian: دهبنه) may refer to:

- Deh Baneh, Lahijan
- Deh Baneh, Rasht
- Deh Baneh, Siahkal

== See also ==
- Deh Boneh (disambiguation)
