= Balasbaneh =

Village in Gilan province, Iran

Balasbaneh Persian: بلسبنه
- Village
- Location within Iran
- Coordinates: 37°16′34″N 49°44′24″E
- Country: Iran
- Province: Gilan
- County: Rasht
- District: Kuchesfahan
- Rural District: Balasbaneh

Population (2016)
  - Total: 1,420
- Time zone: UTC+3:30 (IRST)

Balasbaneh (Persian: بلسبنه) (Note: Also romanized as Balasbanah, Balasboneh, and Belesbeneh; also known as Bālselboneh and Bilisi-Bene) is a village in, and the capital of, Balasbaneh Rural District in Kuchesfahan District of Rasht County, Gilan province, Iran.

== Demographics ==
=== Population ===
At the time of the 2006 National Census, the village's population was 1,526 in 427 households. The following census in 2011 counted 1,500 people in 464 households. The 2016 census measured the population of the village as 1,420 people in 492 households.
