= Janakbar =

Village in Gilan province, Iran

Janakbar Persian: جانكبر
- Village
- Location within Iran
- Coordinates: 37°16′30″N 49°47′33″E
- Country: Iran
- Province: Gilan
- County: Rasht
- District: Kuchesfahan
- Rural District: Kenar Sar

Population (2016)
  - Total: 335
- Time zone: UTC+3:30 (IRST)

Janakbar (Persian: جانكبر) (Note: Also romanized as Jānakbar) is a village in Kenar Sar Rural District of Kuchesfahan District in Rasht County, Gilan province, Iran.

== Demographics ==
=== Population ===
At the time of the 2006 National Census, the village's population was 268 in 74 households. The following census in 2011 counted 215 people in 64 households. The 2016 census measured the population of the village as 335 people in 121 households.
