= Sheykh Ali Bast =

Village in Gilan province, Iran

Sheykh Ali Bast Persian: شيخ علي بست
- Village
- Location within Iran
- Coordinates: 37°11′45″N 49°47′10″E
- Country: Iran
- Province: Gilan
- County: Rasht
- District: Sangar
- Rural District: Eslamabad

Population (2016)
  - Total: 593
- Time zone: UTC+3:30 (IRST)

Sheykh Ali Bast (Persian: شيخ علي بست) (Note: Also romanized as Shaikh-Ali-Bast, Sheikh Ali Bast, and Sheykh ‘Alī Bast) is a village in Eslamabad Rural District of Sangar District in Rasht County, Gilan province, Iran.

== Demographics ==
=== Population ===
At the time of the 2006 National Census, the village's population was 696 in 221 households. The following census in 2011 counted 677 people in 248 households. The 2016 census measured the population of the village as 593 people in 218 households.
