= Pashkeh =

Village in Gilan province, Iran

Pashkeh Persian: پشكه
- Village
- Location within Iran
- Coordinates: 37°18′11″N 49°45′22″E
- Country: Iran
- Province: Gilan
- County: Rasht
- District: Kuchesfahan
- Rural District: Balasbaneh

Population (2016)
  - Total: 554
- Time zone: UTC+3:30 (IRST)

Pashkeh (Persian: پشكه) (Note: Also known as Pashgeh) is a village in Balasbaneh Rural District of Kuchesfahan District in Rasht County, Gilan province, Iran.

== Demographics ==
=== Population ===
At the time of the 2006 National Census, the village's population was 654 in 199 households. The following census in 2011 counted 637 people in 226 households. The 2016 census measured the population of the village as 554 people in 207 households.
