= Molla Sara, Rasht =

Village in Gilan province, Iran

Molla Sara Persian: ملاسرا
- Village
- Location within Iran
- Coordinates: 37°15′42″N 49°41′38″E
- Country: Iran
- Province: Gilan
- County: Rasht
- District: Kuchesfahan
- Rural District: Balasbaneh

Population (2016)
  - Total: 919
- Time zone: UTC+3:30 (IRST)

Molla Sara (Persian: ملاسرا) (Note: Also romanized as Mollā Sarā) is a village in Balasbaneh Rural District of Kuchesfahan District in Rasht County, Gilan province, Iran.

== Demographics ==
=== Population ===
At the time of the 2006 National Census, the village's population was 929 in 266 households. The following census in 2011 counted 933 people in 290 households. The 2016 census measured the population of the village as 919 people in 308 households.
