= Gil-e Pord-e Sar =

Village in Gilan province, Iran

Gil-e Pord-e Sar Persian: گيل پرده سر
- Village
- Location within Iran
- Coordinates: 37°12′55″N 49°39′45″E
- Country: Iran
- Province: Gilan
- County: Rasht
- District: Sangar
- Rural District: Sangar

Population (2016)
  - Total: 1,922
- Time zone: UTC+3:30 (IRST)

Gil Pordeh Sar (Persian: گيل پرده سر) (Note: Also romanized as Gīl Pordeh Sar; also known as Gīl-e Pardesar, Gīleh Pordesar, Gol Pardehsar, Gol Pardsar, Gul-Pardasar, and Gulpardsar; Gilaki: گيل ٚ پۊرد ٚ سر) is a village in Sangar Rural District of Sangar District in Rasht County, Gilan province, Iran.

== Demographics ==
=== Population ===
At the time of the 2006 National Census, the village's population was 1,865 in 512 households. The following census in 2011 counted 2,018 people in 634 households. The 2016 census measured the population of the village as 1,922 people in 636 households.
