= Keshel Varzal =

Village in Gilan province, Iran

Keshel Varzal Persian: كشل ورزل
- Village
- Location within Iran
- Coordinates: 37°11′05″N 49°37′04″E
- Country: Iran
- Province: Gilan
- County: Rasht
- District: Sangar
- Rural District: Eslamabad

Population (2016)
  - Total: 341
- Time zone: UTC+3:30 (IRST)

Keshel Varzal (Persian: كشل ورزل) (Note: Also known as Keshel) is a village in Eslamabad Rural District of Sangar District in Rasht County, Gilan province, Iran.

== Demographics ==
=== Population ===
At the time of the 2006 National Census, the village's population was 402 in 105 households. The following census in 2011 counted 363 people in 112 households. The 2016 census measured the population of the village as 341 people in 109 households.
