= Kisavandan =

Village in Gilan province, Iran

Kisavandan Persian: كيساوندان
- Village
- Location within Iran
- Coordinates: 37°14′36″N 49°43′27″E
- Country: Iran
- Province: Gilan
- County: Rasht
- District: Sangar
- Rural District: Sangar

Population (2016)
  - Total: 394
- Time zone: UTC+3:30 (IRST)

Kisavandan (Persian: كيساوندان) (Note: Also romanized as Kīsāvandān) is a village in Sangar Rural District of Sangar District in Rasht County, Gilan province, Iran.

== Demographics ==
=== Population ===
At the time of the 2006 National Census, the village's population was 397 in 119 households. The following census in 2011 counted 402 people in 137 households. The 2016 census measured the population of the village as 394 people in 137 households.
