= Omesheh =

Village in Gilan province, Iran

Omesheh Persian: امشه
- Village
- Location within Iran
- Coordinates: 37°13′19″N 49°42′24″E
- Country: Iran
- Province: Gilan
- County: Rasht
- District: Sangar
- Rural District: Sangar

Population (2016)
  - Total: 869
- Time zone: UTC+3:30 (IRST)

Omesheh (Persian: امشه) (Note: Also romanized as Omm-e Shah and Ommsheh; also known as Omshāsehveh and Umushe) is a village in Sangar Rural District of Sangar District in Rasht County, Gilan province, Iran.

== Demographics ==
=== Population ===
At the time of the 2006 National Census, the village's population was 795 in 227 households. The following census in 2011 counted 1,015 people in 297 households. The 2016 census measured the population of the village as 869 people in 297 households.
