= Pish Kenar =

Village in Gilan province, Iran

Pish Kenar Persian: پيش كنار
- Village
- Location within Iran
- Coordinates: 37°08′49″N 49°43′24″E
- Country: Iran
- Province: Gilan
- County: Rasht
- District: Sangar
- Rural District: Eslamabad

Population (2016)
  - Total: 931
- Time zone: UTC+3:30 (IRST)

Pish Kenar (Persian: پيش كنار) (Note: Also romanized as Pīsh Kenār and Pishkanar) is a village in Eslamabad Rural District of Sangar District in Rasht County, Gilan province, Iran.

== Demographics ==
=== Population ===
At the time of the 2006 National Census, the village's population was 1,088 in 297 households. The following census in 2011 counted 1,027 people in 309 households. The 2016 census measured the population of the village as 931 people in 308 households.
