= Chanajeh =

Village in Gilan province, Iran

Chanajeh Persian: چنجه
- Village
- Location within Iran
- Coordinates: 37°13′59″N 49°42′04″E
- Country: Iran
- Province: Gilan
- County: Rasht
- District: Sangar
- Rural District: Sangar

Population (2016)
  - Total: 452
- Time zone: UTC+3:30 (IRST)

Chanajeh (Persian: چنجه) (Note: Also known as Chanacheh) is a village in Sangar Rural District of Sangar District in Rasht County, Gilan province, Iran.

== Demographics ==
=== Population ===
At the time of the 2006 National Census, the village's population was 433 in 133 households. The following census in 2011 counted 465 people in 150 households. The 2016 census measured the population of the village as 452 people in 158 households.
