= Miandeh, Rasht =

Village in Gilan province, Iran

Miandeh Persian: ميانده
- Village
- Location within Iran
- Coordinates: 37°12′20″N 49°43′41″E
- Country: Iran
- Province: Gilan
- County: Rasht
- District: Sangar
- Rural District: Sangar

Population (2016)
  - Total: 433
- Time zone: UTC+3:30 (IRST)

Miandeh (Persian: ميانده) (Note: Also romanized as Mīāndeh) is a village in Sangar Rural District of Sangar District in Rasht County, Gilan province, Iran.

== Demographics ==
=== Population ===
At the time of the 2006 National Census, the village's population was 602 in 158 households. The following census in 2011 counted 522 people in 162 households. The 2016 census measured the population of the village as 433 people in 142 households.
