= Qaziyan =

Village in Gilan province, Iran

Qaziyan Persian: قاضيان
- Village
- Location within Iran
- Coordinates: 37°06′57″N 49°42′05″E
- Country: Iran
- Province: Gilan
- County: Rasht
- District: Sangar
- Rural District: Saravan

Population (2016)
  - Total: 2,836
- Time zone: UTC+3:30 (IRST)

Qaziyan (Persian: قاضيان) (Note: Also romanized as Qāzeyān, Qāzīān, and Qāzīyān; also known as Ghāzeyān and Ghāzīān) is a village in Saravan Rural District of Sangar District in Rasht County, Gilan province, Iran.

== Demographics ==
=== Population ===
At the time of the 2006 National Census, the village's population was 3,196 in 899 households. The following census in 2011 counted 3,056 people in 966 households. The 2016 census measured the population of the village as 2,836 people in 993 households.
