= Gileva Dashtan =

Village in Gilan province, Iran

Gileva Dashtan Persian: گيلوا دشتان
- Village
- Location within Iran
- Coordinates: 37°18′33″N 49°48′26″E
- Country: Iran
- Province: Gilan
- County: Rasht
- District: Kuchesfahan
- Rural District: Kenar Sar

Population (2016)
  - Total: 1,706
- Time zone: UTC+3:30 (IRST)

Gileva Dashtan (Persian: گيلوادشتان) (Note: Also romanized as Gilova Dashtan, Gīlovā Dashtān, Gilva Dashtan, and Gīlvā Dashtān; also known as Gīlovā and Gīlvā) is a village in Kenar Sar Rural District of Kuchesfahan District in Rasht County, Gilan province, Iran.

== Demographics ==
=== Population ===
At the time of the 2006 National Census, the village's population was 1,990 in 600 households. The following census in 2011 counted 1,929 people in 702 households. The 2016 census measured the population of the village as 1,706 people in 638 households. It was the most populous village in its rural district.
