= Siah Sufian =

Village in Gilan province, Iran

Siah Sufian Persian: سياه صوفيان
- Village
- Location within Iran
- Coordinates: 37°19′11″N 49°42′33″E
- Country: Iran
- Province: Gilan
- County: Rasht
- District: Kuchesfahan
- Rural District: Balasbaneh

Population (2016)
  - Total: 482
- Time zone: UTC+3:30 (IRST)

Siah Sufian (Persian: سياه صوفيان) (Note: Also romanized as Sīāh Şūfīān) is a village in Balasbaneh Rural District of Kuchesfahan District in Rasht County, Gilan province, Iran.

== Demographics ==
=== Population ===
At the time of the 2006 National Census, the village's population was 534 in 149 households. The following census in 2011 counted 517 people in 160 households. The 2016 census measured the population of the village as 482 people in 156 households.
