= Kacha, Iran =

Village in Gilan province, Iran

Kacha Persian: كچا
- Village
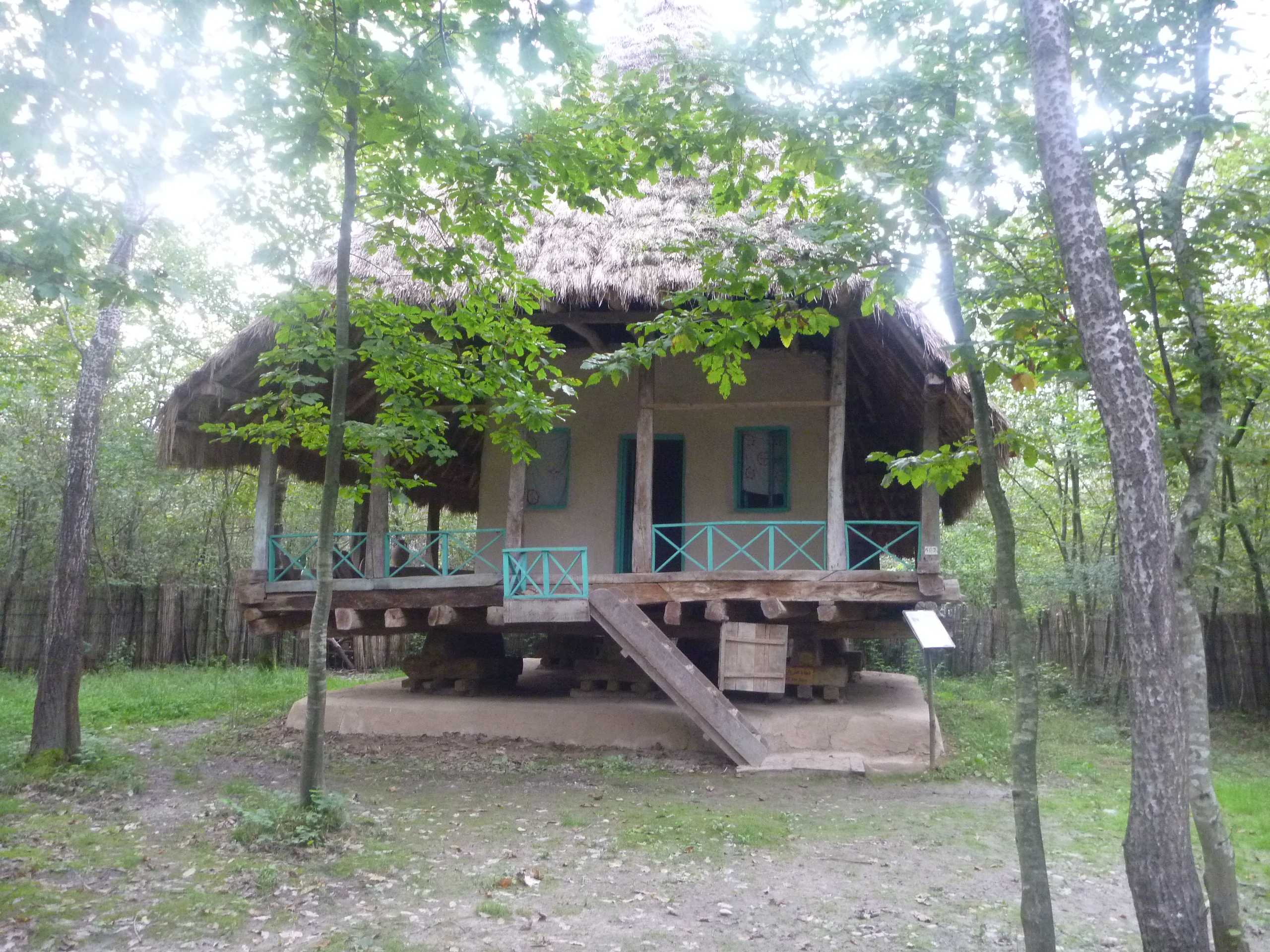
- Old house in the village of Kacha

- Location within Iran
- Coordinates: 37°05′27″N 49°36′55″E
- Country: Iran
- Province: Gilan
- County: Rasht
- District: Sangar
- Rural District: Saravan

Population (2016)
  - Total: 292
- Time zone: UTC+3:30 (IRST)

Kacha (Persian: كچا) (Note: Also romanized as Kāchā and Kachā; also known as Kachā Pā’īn Maḩalleh, Kacheh, and Kechakh) is a village in Saravan Rural District of Sangar District in Rasht County, Gilan province, Iran.

== Demographics ==
=== Population ===
At the time of the 2006 National Census, the village's population was 486 in 134 households. The following census in 2011 counted 391 people in 114 households. The 2016 census measured the population of the village as 292 people in 104 households.
