= Hasanabad, Rasht =

Village in Gilan province, Iran

Hasanabad Persian: حسن اباد
- Village
- Location within Iran
- Coordinates: 37°16′35″N 49°43′42″E
- Country: Iran
- Province: Gilan
- County: Rasht
- District: Kuchesfahan
- Rural District: Balasbaneh

Population (2016)
  - Total: 247
- Time zone: UTC+3:30 (IRST)

Hasanabad (Persian: حسن اباد) (Note: Also romanized as Ḩasanābād; also known as Khasanabad) is a village in Balasbaneh Rural District of Kuchesfahan District in Rasht County, Gilan province, Iran.

== Demographics ==
=== Population ===
At the time of the 2006 National Census, the village's population was 314 in 76 households. The following census in 2011 counted 298 people in 95 households. The 2016 census measured the population of the village as 247 people in 91 households.
