= Shekar Sara =

Village in Gilan province, Iran

Shekar Sara Persian: شكارسرا
- Village
- Location within Iran
- Coordinates: 37°18′18″N 49°42′34″E
- Country: Iran
- Province: Gilan
- County: Rasht
- District: Kuchesfahan
- Rural District: Balasbaneh

Population (2016)
  - Total: 509
- Time zone: UTC+3:30 (IRST)

Shekar Sara (Persian: شكارسرا) (Note: Also romanized as Shekār Sarā) is a village in Balasbaneh Rural District of Kuchesfahan District in Rasht County, Gilan province, Iran.

== Demographics ==
=== Population ===
At the time of the 2006 National Census, the village's population was 608 in 157 households. The following census in 2011 counted 572 people in 183 households. The 2016 census measured the population of the village as 509 people in 169 households.
