= Ali Nowdeh =

Village in Gilan province, Iran

Ali Nowdeh Persian: علي نوده
- Village
- Location within Iran
- Coordinates: 37°18′43″N 49°45′34″E
- Country: Iran
- Province: Gilan
- County: Rasht
- District: Kuchesfahan
- Rural District: Balasbaneh

Population (2016)
  - Total: 366
- Time zone: UTC+3:30 (IRST)

Ali Nowdeh (Persian: علي نوده) (Note: Also romanized as ‘Alī Now Deh and ‘Alī Nowdeh) is a village in Balasbaneh Rural District of Kuchesfahan District in Rasht County, Gilan province, Iran.

== Demographics ==
=== Population ===
At the time of the 2006 National Census, the village's population was 524 in 155 households. The following census in 2011 counted 472 people in 150 households. The 2016 census measured the population of the village as 366 people in 130 households.
