= Jafarabad, Gilan =

Village in Gilan province, Iran

Jafarabad Persian: جعفرآباد
- Village
- Location within Iran
- Coordinates: 37°17′27″N 49°42′31″E
- Country: Iran
- Province: Gilan
- County: Rasht
- District: Kuchesfahan
- Rural District: Balasbaneh

Population (2016)
  - Total: 1,093
- Time zone: UTC+3:30 (IRST)

Jafarabad (Persian: جعفرآباد) (Note: Also romanized as Dzhaffarabad and Ja‘farābād) is a village in Balasbaneh Rural District of Kuchesfahan District in Rasht County, Gilan province, Iran.

== Demographics ==
=== Population ===
At the time of the 2006 National Census, the village's population was 948 in 264 households. The following census in 2011 counted 957 people in 303 households. The 2016 census measured the population of the village as 1,093 people in 369 households.
