= Laleh Dasht =

Village in Gilan province, Iran

Laleh Dasht Persian: لاله دشت
- Village
- Location within Iran
- Coordinates: 37°17′02″N 49°45′37″E
- Country: Iran
- Province: Gilan
- County: Rasht
- District: Kuchesfahan
- Rural District: Balasbaneh

Population (2016)
  - Total: 639
- Time zone: UTC+3:30 (IRST)

Laleh Dasht (Persian: لاله دشت) (Note: Also romanized as Lāleh Dasht; also known as Laldash) is a village in Balasbaneh Rural District of Kuchesfahan District in Rasht County, Gilan province, Iran.

== Demographics ==
=== Population ===
At the time of the 2006 National Census, the village's population was 738 in 209 households. The following census in 2011 counted 727 people in 251 households. The 2016 census measured the population of the village as 639 people in 220 households.
