= Bonakdeh =

Village in Gilan province, Iran

Bonakdeh Persian: بنكده
- Village
- Location within Iran
- Coordinates: 37°10′04″N 49°43′39″E
- Country: Iran
- Province: Gilan
- County: Rasht
- District: Sangar
- Rural District: Eslamabad

Population (2016)
  - Total: 1,182
- Time zone: UTC+3:30 (IRST)

Bonakdeh (Persian: بنكده) (Note: Also known as Benekde) is a village in Eslamabad Rural District of Sangar District in Rasht County, Gilan province, Iran.

== Demographics ==
=== Population ===
At the time of the 2006 National Census, the village's population was 1,285 in 336 households. The following census in 2011 counted 1,271 people in 389 households. The 2016 census measured the population of the village as 1,182 people in 401 households.
