= Ali Sara, Rasht =

Village in Gilan province, Iran

Ali Sara Persian: علي سرا
- Village
- Location within Iran
- Coordinates: 37°18′47″N 49°42′07″E
- Country: Iran
- Province: Gilan
- County: Rasht
- District: Kuchesfahan
- Rural District: Balasbaneh

Population (2016)
  - Total: 167
- Time zone: UTC+3:30 (IRST)

Ali Sara (Persian: علي سرا) (Note: Also romanized as ‘Ālī Sarā) is a village in Balasbaneh Rural District of Kuchesfahan District in Rasht County, Gilan province, Iran.

== Demographics ==
=== Population ===
At the time of the 2006 National Census, the village's population was 173 in 47 households. The following census in 2011 counted 181 people in 54 households. The 2016 census measured the population of the village as 167 people in 53 households.
