= Turan Sara =

Village in Gilan province, Iran

Turan Sara Persian: تورانسرا
- Village
- Location within Iran
- Coordinates: 37°14′30″N 49°41′42″E
- Country: Iran
- Province: Gilan
- County: Rasht
- District: Sangar
- Rural District: Sangar

Population (2016)
  - Total: 538
- Time zone: UTC+3:30 (IRST)

Turan Sara (Persian: تورانسرا) (Note: Also romanized as Tūrān Sarā and Tūrānsarā) is a village in Sangar Rural District of Sangar District in Rasht County, Gilan province, Iran.

== Demographics ==
=== Population ===
At the time of the 2006 National Census, the village's population was 526 in 143 households. The following census in 2011 counted 543 people in 174 households. The 2016 census measured the population of the village as 538 people in 179 households.
