= Gol Sarak =

Village in Gilan province, Iran

Gol Sarak Persian: گلسرک
- Village
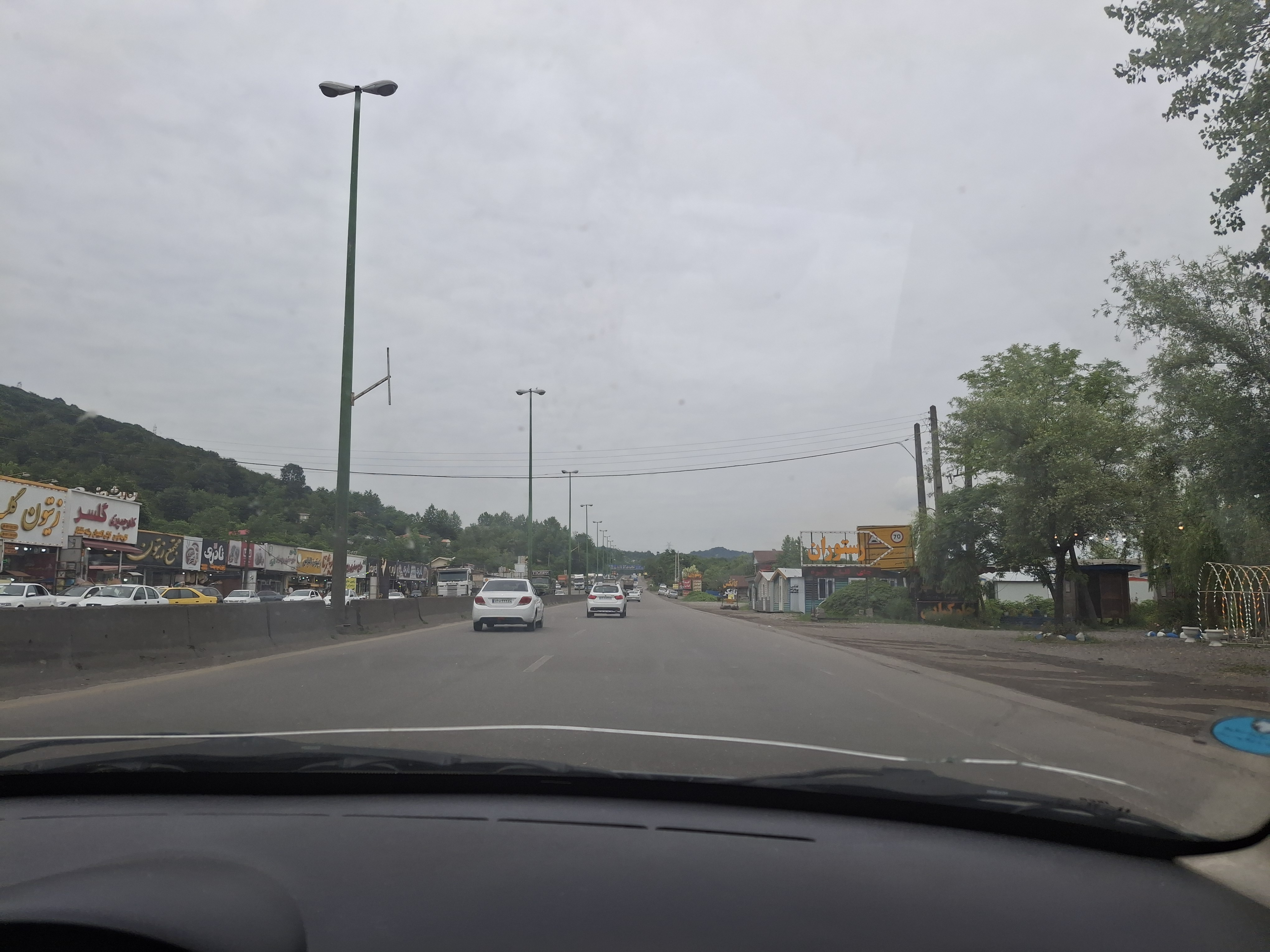
- The village of Gol Sarak from the Rasht–Qazvin Road

- Location within Iran
- Coordinates: 37°02′38″N 49°37′44″E
- Country: Iran
- Province: Gilan
- County: Rasht
- District: Sangar
- Rural District: Saravan

Population (2016)
  - Total: 1,283
- Time zone: UTC+3:30 (IRST)

Gol Sarak (Persian: گلسرک) (Note: Also known as Gol Sarak-e Sarāvān) is a village in Saravan Rural District of Sangar District in Rasht County, Gilan province, Iran.

== Demographics ==
=== Population ===
At the time of the 2006 National Census, the village's population was 1,782 in 469 households. The following census in 2011 counted 1,692 people in 509 households. The 2016 census measured the population of the village as 1,283 people in 437 households.
