= Saravan, Gilan =

Village in Gilan province, Iran

Saravan Persian: سراوان
- Village
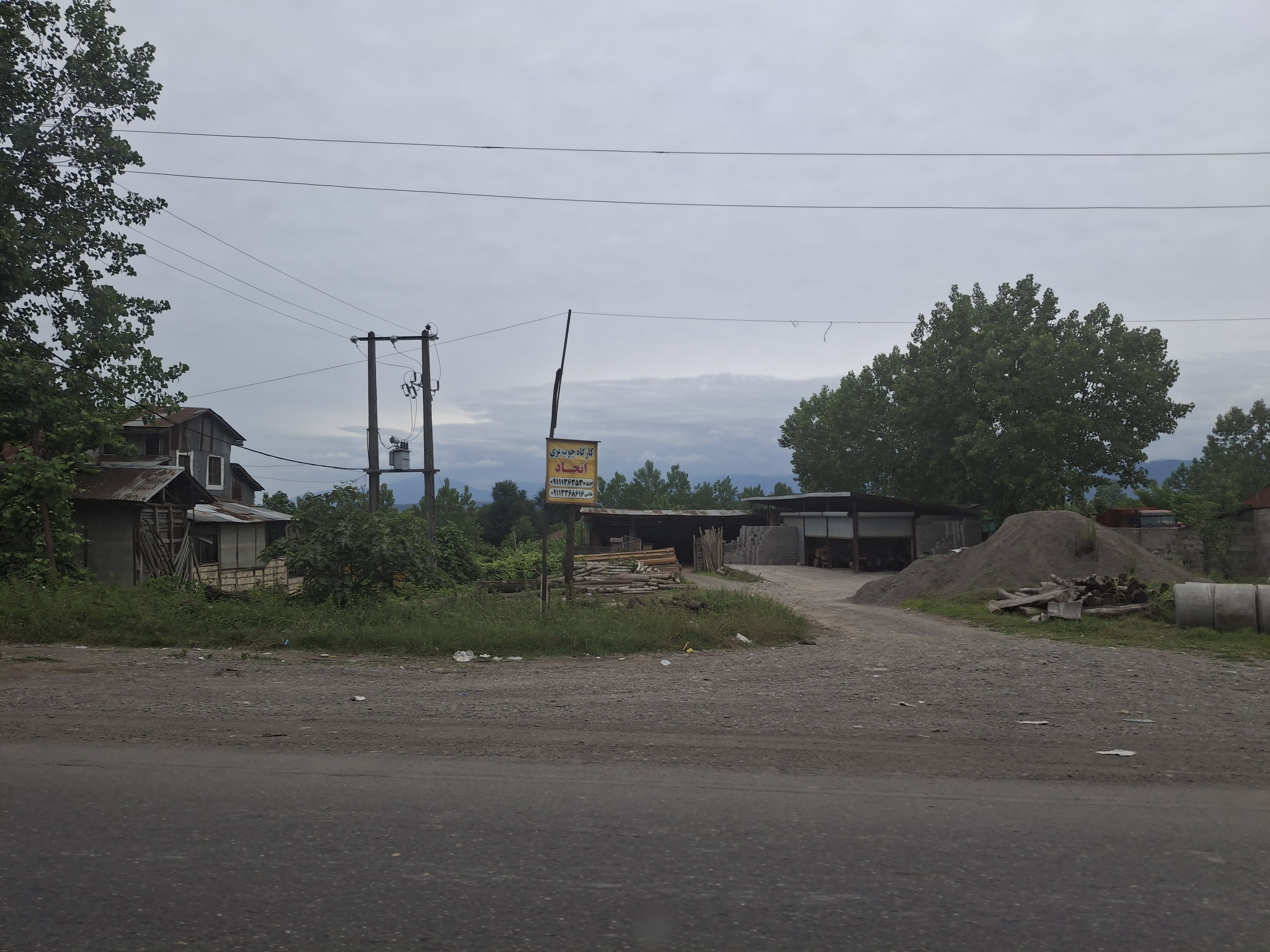
- The village of Saravan

- Location within Iran
- Coordinates: 37°04′57″N 49°39′14″E
- Country: Iran
- Province: Gilan
- County: Rasht
- District: Sangar
- Rural District: Saravan

Population (2016)
  - Total: 5,542
- Time zone: UTC+3:30 (IRST)

Saravan (Persian: سراوان) (Note: Also romanized as Sarāvān, Sarawān, and Seravan) is a village in, and the capital of, Saravan Rural District in Sangar District of Rasht County, Gilan province, Iran.

== Demographics ==
=== Population ===
At the time of the 2006 National Census, the village's population was 5,740 in 1,511 households. The following census in 2011 counted 6,073 people in 1,837 households. The 2016 census measured the population of the village as 5,542 people in 1,837 households. It was the most populous village in its rural district.
