= Now Estalakh =

Village in Gilan province, Iran

Now Estalakh Persian: نواسطلخ
- Village
- Location within Iran
- Coordinates: 37°20′21″N 49°44′50″E
- Country: Iran
- Province: Gilan
- County: Rasht
- District: Kuchesfahan
- Rural District: Balasbaneh

Population (2016)
  - Total: 296
- Time zone: UTC+3:30 (IRST)

Now Estalakh (Persian: نواسطلخ) (Note: Also romanized as Novāsţalkh, Now Asţalakh, and Now Esţalakh) is a village in Balasbaneh Rural District of Kuchesfahan District in Rasht County, Gilan province, Iran.

== Demographics ==
=== Population ===
At the time of the 2006 National Census, the village's population was 371 in 106 households. The following census in 2011 counted 337 people in 106 households. The 2016 census measured the population of the village as 296 people in 93 households.
