= Kia Sara, Rasht =

Village in Gilan province, Iran

Kia Sara Persian: كياسرا
- Village
- Location within Iran
- Coordinates: 37°12′12″N 49°45′13″E
- Country: Iran
- Province: Gilan
- County: Rasht
- District: Sangar
- Rural District: Sangar

Population (2016)
  - Total: 664
- Time zone: UTC+3:30 (IRST)

Kia Sara (Persian: كياسرا) (Note: Also romanized as Keyā Sarā, Kīā Sarā, and Kiya Sara) is a village in Sangar Rural District of Sangar District in Rasht County, Gilan province, Iran.

== Demographics ==
=== Population ===
At the time of the 2006 National Census, the village's population was 636 in 205 households. The following census in 2011 counted 819 people in 282 households. The 2016 census measured the population of the village as 664 people in 225 households.
