= Shahrestan, Sangar =

Village in Gilan province, Iran

Shahrestan Persian: شهرستان
- Village
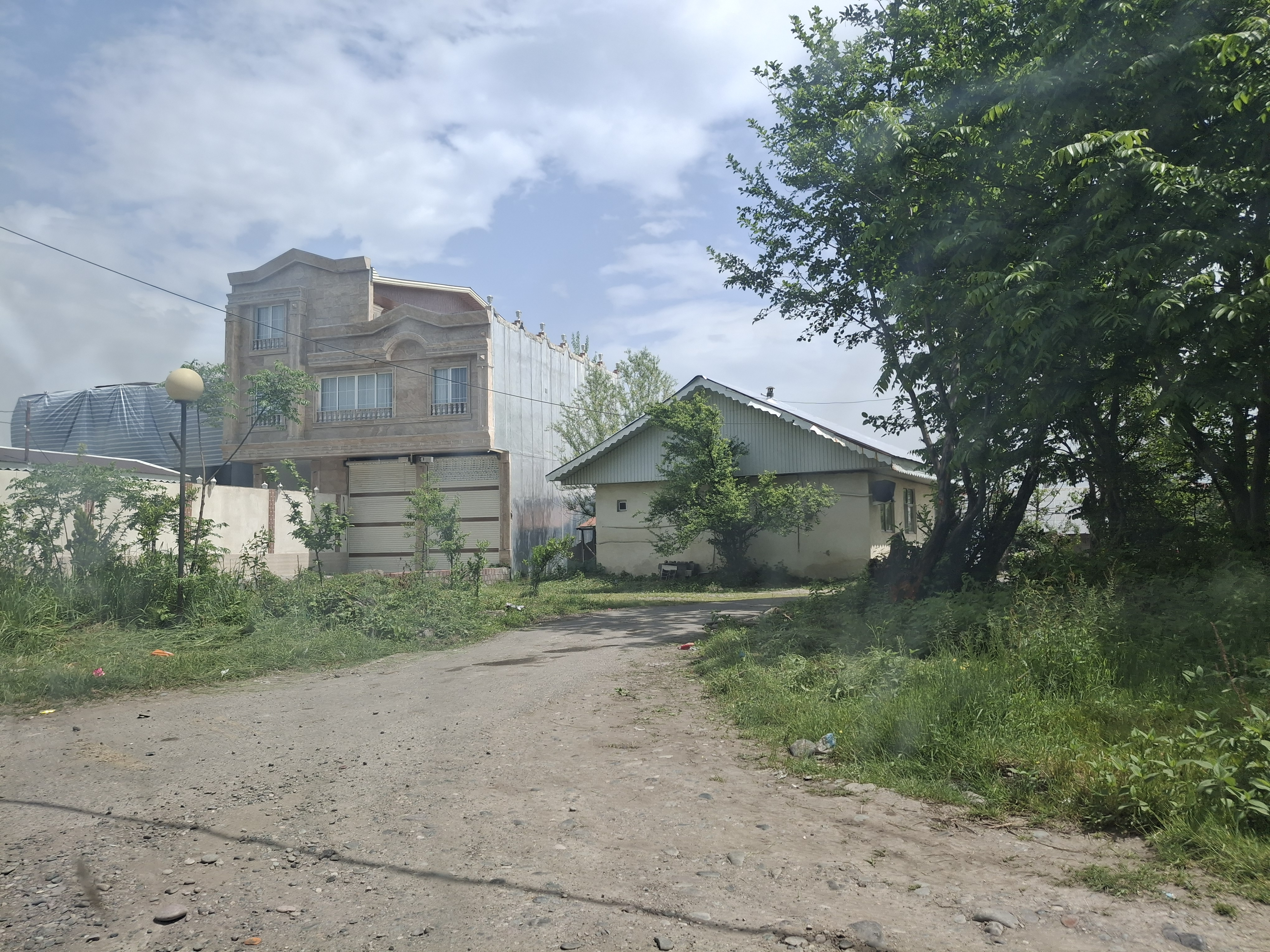
- The village of Shahrestan

- Location within Iran
- Coordinates: 37°07′30″N 49°41′10″E
- Country: Iran
- Province: Gilan
- County: Rasht
- District: Sangar
- Rural District: Eslamabad

Population (2016)
  - Total: 2,385
- Time zone: UTC+3:30 (IRST)

Shahrestan (Persian: شهرستان) (Note: Also romanized as Shahrestān; also known as Pā’īn Maḩalleh-ye Shahrestān) is a village in Eslamabad Rural District of Sangar District in Rasht County, Gilan province, Iran.

== Demographics ==
=== Population ===
At the time of the 2006 National Census, the village's population was 3,511 in 949 households. The following census in 2011 counted 3,367 people in 1,097 households. The 2016 census measured the population of the village as 2,385 people in 817 households.
