= Rudbar Deh =

Village in Gilan province, Iran

Rudbar Deh Persian: رودبرده
- Village
- Location within Iran
- Coordinates: 37°12′15″N 49°41′07″E
- Country: Iran
- Province: Gilan
- County: Rasht
- District: Sangar
- Rural District: Sangar

Population (2016)
  - Total: 1,120
- Time zone: UTC+3:30 (IRST)

Rudbar Deh (Persian: رودبرده) (Note: Also romanized as Rūdbordeh; also known as Rudburde) is a village in Sangar Rural District of Sangar District in Rasht County, Gilan province, Iran.

== Demographics ==
=== Population ===
At the time of the 2006 National Census, the village's population was 2,563 in 715 households. The following census in 2011 counted 1,175 people in 363 households. The 2016 census measured the population of the village as 1,120 people in 361 households.
