= Barka Deh =

Barka Deh or Barkadeh (Persian: بركاده) may refer to:

- Bala Mahalleh-ye Barka Deh
- Barka Deh-e Pain
