= Shirayeh =

Shirayeh (Persian: شيرايه) may refer to:

- Shirayeh, Rasht
- Shirayeh, Rudsar
