= Nashrud Kol =

Village in Gilan province, Iran

Nashrud Kol Persian: نشرودكل
- Village
- Location within Iran
- Coordinates: 37°11′04″N 49°43′10″E
- Country: Iran
- Province: Gilan
- County: Rasht
- District: Sangar
- Rural District: Sangar

Population (2016)
  - Total: 1,192
- Time zone: UTC+3:30 (IRST)

Nashrud Kol (Persian: نشرودكل) (Note: Also romanized as Nashrood Kal and Nashrūd Kol; also known as Nushrudkul) is a village in Sangar Rural District of Sangar District in Rasht County, Gilan province, Iran.

== Demographics ==
=== Population ===
At the time of the 2006 National Census, the village's population was 1,304 in 322 households. The following census in 2011 counted 1,286 people in 399 households. The 2016 census measured the population of the village as 1,192 people in 387 households.
