= Jir Sara, Gilan =

Village in Gilan province, Iran

Jir Sara Persian: جيرسرا
- Village
- Location within Iran
- Coordinates: 37°17′14″N 49°43′52″E
- Country: Iran
- Province: Gilan
- County: Rasht
- District: Kuchesfahan
- Rural District: Balasbaneh

Population (2016)
  - Total: 731
- Time zone: UTC+3:30 (IRST)

Jir Sara (Persian: جيرسرا) (Note: Also romanized as Jīr Sarā) is a village in Balasbaneh Rural District of Kuchesfahan District in Rasht County, Gilan province, Iran.

== Demographics ==
=== Population ===
At the time of the 2006 National Census, the village's population was 807 in 223 households. The following census in 2011 counted 753 people in 250 households. The 2016 census measured the population of the village as 731 people in 254 households.
