= Sedeh, Gilan =

Village in Gilan province, Iran

Sedeh Persian: سده
- Village
- Location within Iran
- Coordinates: 37°14′36″N 49°45′12″E
- Country: Iran
- Province: Gilan
- County: Rasht
- District: Kuchesfahan
- Rural District: Balasbaneh

Population (2016)
  - Total: 1,928
- Time zone: UTC+3:30 (IRST)

Sedeh (Persian: سده) (Note: Also known as Seh Deh, Sehdeh-e Bālā, and Side) is a village in Balasbaneh Rural District of Kuchesfahan District in Rasht County, Gilan province, Iran.

== Demographics ==
=== Population ===
At the time of the 2006 National Census, the village's population was 2,175 in 586 households. The following census in 2011 counted 1,959 people in 601 households. The 2016 census measured the population of the village as 1,928 people in 654 households. It was the most populous village in its rural district.
