= Dalecheh =

Village in Gilan province, Iran

Dalecheh Persian: دلچه
- Village
- Location within Iran
- Coordinates: 37°13′49″N 49°41′15″E
- Country: Iran
- Province: Gilan
- County: Rasht
- District: Sangar
- Rural District: Sangar

Population (2016)
  - Total: 676
- Time zone: UTC+3:30 (IRST)

Dalecheh (Persian: دلچه) is a village in Sangar Rural District of Sangar District in Rasht County, Gilan province, Iran.

== Demographics ==
=== Population ===
At the time of the 2006 National Census, the village's population was 735 in 211 households. The following census in 2011 counted 696 people in 233 households. The 2016 census measured the population of the village as 676 people in 246 households.
