= Mozhdeh, Rasht =

Village in Gilan province, Iran

Mozhdeh Persian: مژده
- Village
- Location within Iran
- Coordinates: 37°16′21″N 49°42′35″E
- Country: Iran
- Province: Gilan
- County: Rasht
- District: Kuchesfahan
- Rural District: Balasbaneh

Population (2016)
  - Total: 1,549
- Time zone: UTC+3:30 (IRST)

Mozhdeh (Persian: مژده) (Note: Also known as Muzhde) is a village in Balasbaneh Rural District of Kuchesfahan District in Rasht County, Gilan province, Iran.

== Demographics ==
=== Population ===
At the time of the 2006 National Census, the village's population was 1,677 in 429 households. The following census in 2011 counted 1,595 people in 511 households. The 2016 census measured the population of the village as 1,549 people in 520 households.
