= Chulab =

Village in Gilan province, Iran

Chulab Persian: چولاب
- Village
- Location within Iran
- Coordinates: 37°15′39″N 49°52′05″E
- Country: Iran
- Province: Gilan
- County: Rasht
- District: Kuchesfahan
- Rural District: Luleman

Population (2016)
  - Total: 992
- Time zone: UTC+3:30 (IRST)

Chulab (Persian: چولاب) (Note: Also romanized as Choolab and Chūlāb) is a village in Luleman Rural District of Kuchesfahan District in Rasht County, Gilan province, Iran.

== Demographics ==
=== Population ===
At the time of the 2006 National Census, the village's population was 993 in 296 households. The following census in 2011 counted 974 people in 342 households. The 2016 census measured the population of the village as 992 people in 353 households.
