= Behdan, Gilan =

Village in Gilan province, Iran

Behdan Persian: بهدان
- Village
- Location within Iran
- Coordinates: 37°09′55″N 49°36′59″E
- Country: Iran
- Province: Gilan
- County: Rasht
- District: Sangar
- Rural District: Eslamabad

Population (2016)
  - Total: 876
- Time zone: UTC+3:30 (IRST)

Behdan (Persian: بهدان) (Note: Also romanized as Behdān; also known as Beidan and Bendan) is a village in Eslamabad Rural District of Sangar District in Rasht County, Gilan province, Iran.

== Demographics ==
=== Population ===
At the time of the 2006 National Census, the village's population was 1,227 in 324 households. The following census in 2011 counted 1,138 people in 346 households. The 2016 census measured the population of the village as 876 people in 276 households.
