= Hendavaneh-ye Pordesar =

Village in Gilan province, Iran

Hendavaneh-ye Pordesar Persian: هندوانه پردسر
- Village
- Location within Iran
- Country: Iran
- Province: Gilan
- County: Rasht
- District: Kuchesfahan
- Rural District: Kenar Sar

Population (2016)
  - Total: 416
- Time zone: UTC+3:30 (IRST)

Hendavaneh-ye Pordesar (Persian: هندوانه پردسر) (Note: Also romanized as Hendavāneh-ye Pordesar; also known as Hendavāneh-ye Desar) is a village in Kenar Sar Rural District of Kuchesfahan District in Rasht County, Gilan province, Iran.

== Demographics ==
=== Population ===
At the time of the 2006 National Census, the village's population was 572 in 173 households. The following census in 2011 counted 497 people in 171 households. The 2016 census measured the population of the village as 416 people in 149 households.
