= Navideh =

Village in Gilan province, Iran

Navideh Persian: نويده
- Village
- Location within Iran
- Coordinates: 37°15′25″N 49°45′15″E
- Country: Iran
- Province: Gilan
- County: Rasht
- District: Kuchesfahan
- Rural District: Balasbaneh

Population (2016)
  - Total: 692
- Time zone: UTC+3:30 (IRST)

Navideh (Persian: نويده) (Note: Also romanized as Navīdeh) is a village in Balasbaneh Rural District of Kuchesfahan District in Rasht County, Gilan province, Iran.

== Demographics ==
=== Population ===
At the time of the 2006 National Census, the village's population was 981 in 283 households. The following census in 2011 counted 899 people in 296 households. The 2016 census measured the population of the village as 692 people in 238 households.
