= Eslamabad, Rasht =

Village in Gilan province, Iran

Eslamabad Persian: اسلام اباد
- Village
- Location within Iran
- Coordinates: 37°08′10″N 49°41′08″E
- Country: Iran
- Province: Gilan
- County: Rasht
- District: Sangar
- Rural District: Eslamabad

Population (2016)
  - Total: 2,392
- Time zone: UTC+3:30 (IRST)

Eslamabad (Persian: اسلام اباد) (Note: Also romanized as Eslāmābād; also known as Shaqaji) is a village in, and the capital of, Eslamabad Rural District in Sangar District of Rasht County, Gilan province, Iran.

== Demographics ==
=== Population ===
The village did not appear in the 2006 and 2011 National Censuses. The 2016 census measured the population of the village as 2,392 people in 797 households.
