= Sestan =

Sestan may refer to:

- Nenad Sestan, professor at Yale School of Medicine.
- Konesestan, a village in Iran.
- Mate Šestan (born 1971), Croatian football player.
