= Mushanga =

Village in Gilan province, Iran

Mushanga Persian: موشنگا
- Village
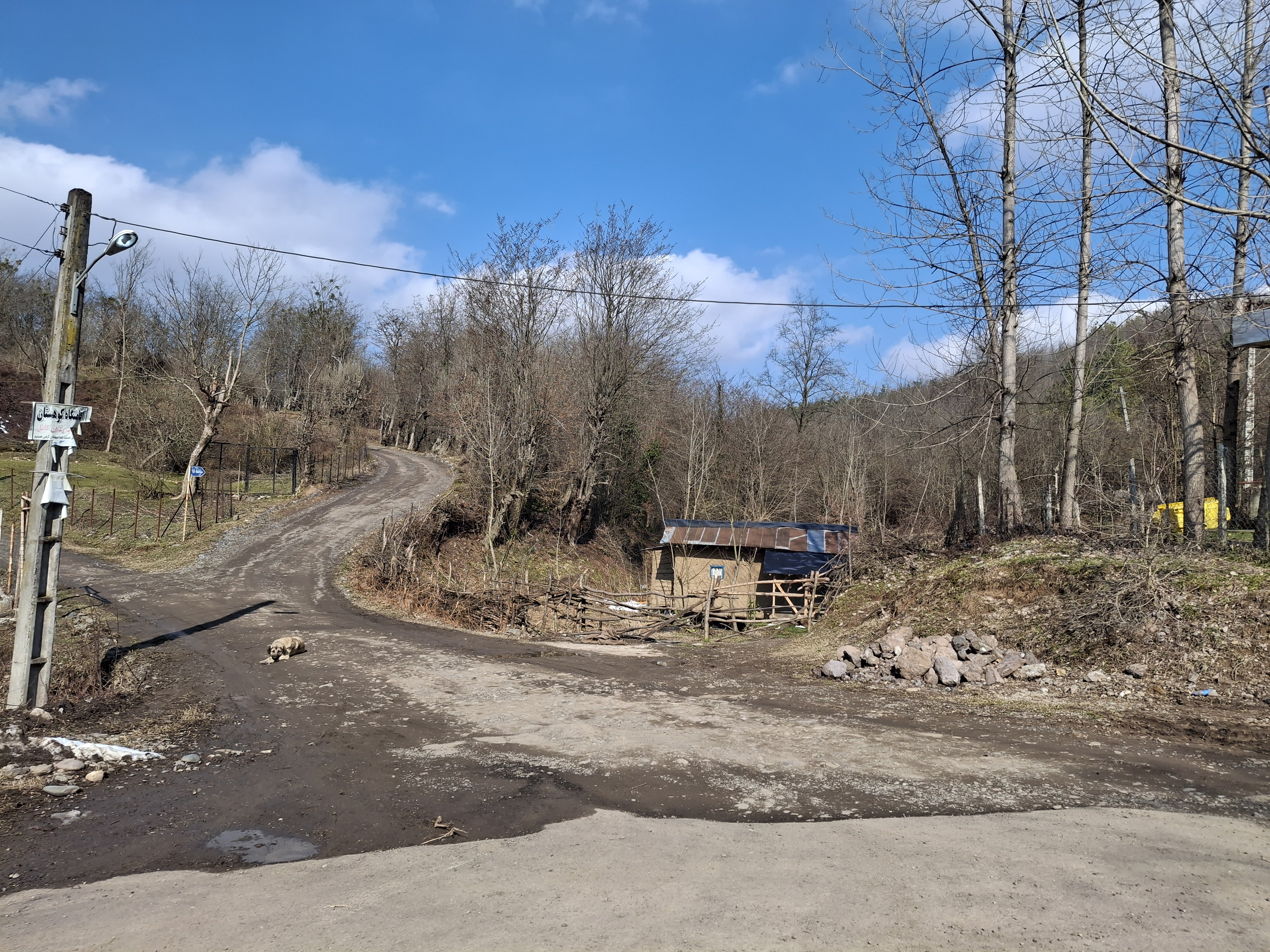
- The village of Mushanga

- Location within Iran
- Coordinates: 37°03′44″N 49°37′00″E
- Country: Iran
- Province: Gilan
- County: Rasht
- District: Sangar
- Rural District: Saravan

Population (2016)
  - Total: 278
- Time zone: UTC+3:30 (IRST)

Mushanga (Persian: موشنگا) (Note: Also romanized as Mūshangā; also known as Mūshangā Bālā and Mūshankā) is a village in Saravan Rural District of Sangar District in Rasht County, Gilan province, Iran.

== Demographics ==
=== Population ===
At the time of the 2006 National Census, the village's population was 273 in 79 households. The following census in 2011 counted 297 people in 91 households. The 2016 census measured the population of the village as 278 people in 96 households.
