= Konesestan =

Village in Gilan province, Iran

Konesestan Persian: كنسستان
- Village
- Location within Iran
- Coordinates: 37°09′22″N 49°44′02″E
- Country: Iran
- Province: Gilan
- County: Rasht
- District: Sangar
- Rural District: Eslamabad

Population (2016)
  - Total: 767
- Time zone: UTC+3:30 (IRST)

Konesestan (Persian: كنسستان) (Note: Also romanized as Konesestān and Konosestān; also known as Koneh Sestān, Konestān, and Kulastan) is a village in Eslamabad Rural District of Sangar District in Rasht County, Gilan province, Iran.

== Demographics ==
=== Population ===
At the time of the 2006 National Census, the village's population was 861 in 234 households. The following census in 2011 counted 860 people in 273 households. The 2016 census measured the population of the village as 767 people in 267 households.
