= Khesht Masjed =

Khesht Masjed or Khesht-e Masjed (Persian: خشت مسجد) may refer to:

- Khesht Masjed, Rasht
- Khesht Masjed, Kuchesfahan, Rasht County
