= Khesht Masjed, Kuchesfahan =

Village in Gilan province, Iran

Khesht Masjed Persian: خشت مسجد
- Village
- Location within Iran
- Coordinates: 37°19′33″N 49°45′16″E
- Country: Iran
- Province: Gilan
- County: Rasht
- District: Kuchesfahan
- Rural District: Balasbaneh

Population (2016)
  - Total: 871
- Time zone: UTC+3:30 (IRST)

Khesht Masjed (Persian: خشت مسجد) (Note: Also romanized as Khesht-e Masjed; also known as Khachta-Mechet and Khesht Masjed Kooch Esfahan) is a village in Balasbaneh Rural District of Kuchesfahan District in Rasht County, Gilan province, Iran.

== Demographics ==
=== Population ===
At the time of the 2006 National Census, the village's population was 935 in 297 households. The following census in 2011 counted 928 people in 308 households. The 2016 census measured the population of the village as 871 people in 292 households.
