= Sangar Rural District =

Sangar Rural District (Persian: دهستان سنگر) may refer to:

- Sangar Rural District (Gilan Province)
- Sangar Rural District (North Khorasan Province)
