= Barka Deh-e Pain =

Village in Gilan province, Iran

Barka Deh-e Pain Persian: بركاده پايين
- Village
- Location within Iran
- Coordinates: 37°18′25″N 49°43′39″E
- Country: Iran
- Province: Gilan
- County: Rasht
- District: Kuchesfahan
- Rural District: Balasbaneh

Population (2016)
  - Total: 1,256
- Time zone: UTC+3:30 (IRST)

Barka Deh-e Pain (Persian: بركاده پايين) (Note: Also romanized as Barkā Deh-ye Pā’īn and Barkādeh-ye Pā’īn; also known as Barkā Deh, Barkeh Deh, Berka-De, Buzgāh Deh, and Pā’īn Maḩalleh-ye Barkādeh) is a village in Balasbaneh Rural District of Kuchesfahan District in Rasht County, Gilan province, Iran.

== Demographics ==
=== Population ===
At the time of the 2006 National Census, the village's population was 1,385 in 431 households. The following census in 2011 counted 1,351 people in 447 households. The 2016 census measured the population of the village as 1,256 people in 455 households.
