= Mushanga (disambiguation) =

Mushanga is a village in Gilan Province, Iran.

Mushanga may also refer to:

- "Mushanga", a song by Toto from The Seventh One
- Bogger Mushanga (born 6 June 1952), a Zambian triple jumper
- Sydney Mushanga (born 26 April 1977), a Zambian politician
