= Lulaman Rural District =

Lulaman Rural District or Luleman Rural District (Persian: دهستان لولمان) may refer to:

- Lulaman Rural District (Fuman County)
- Luleman Rural District (Rasht County)
