= Baz Qaleh-ye Malek =

Village in Gilan province, Iran

Baz Qaleh-ye Malek Persian: بازقلعه ملك
- Village
- Location within Iran
- Coordinates: 37°11′14″N 49°44′39″E
- Country: Iran
- Province: Gilan
- County: Rasht
- District: Sangar
- Rural District: Sangar

Population (2016)
  - Total: 377
- Time zone: UTC+3:30 (IRST)

Baz Qaleh-ye Malek (Persian: بازقلعه ملك) (Note: Also romanized as Bāz Qal‘eh-e Malek and Bāz Qal‘eh-ye Malek) is a village in Sangar Rural District of Sangar District in Rasht County, Gilan province, Iran.

== Demographics ==
=== Population ===
At the time of the 2006 National Census, the village's population was 489 in 155 households. The following census in 2011 counted 435 people in 155 households. The 2016 census measured the population of the village as 377 people in 126 households.
