= Emamzadeh Hashem =

Emamzadeh Hashem (Persian: امامزاده هاشم) may refer to several places in Iran:

- Emamzadeh Hashem, Rasht, Gilan Province
- Ketel Emamzadeh Hashem, Mazandaran Province
- Emamzadeh Hashem Shrine, in Amol County, Mazandaran, north of Damavand in Tehran Province
