= Baz Qaleh-ye Akbar =

Village in Gilan province, Iran

Baz Qaleh-ye Akbar Persian: بازقلعه اكبر
- Village
- Location within Iran
- Coordinates: 37°09′53″N 49°44′24″E
- Country: Iran
- Province: Gilan
- County: Rasht
- District: Sangar
- Rural District: Eslamabad

Population (2016)
  - Total: 839
- Time zone: UTC+3:30 (IRST)

Baz Qaleh-ye Akbar (Persian: بازقلعه اكبر) (Note: Also romanized as Bāz Qal‘eh-e Akbar and Bāz Qal‘eh-ye Akbar) is a village in Eslamabad Rural District of Sangar District in Rasht County, Gilan province, Iran.

== Demographics ==
=== Population ===
At the time of the 2006 National Census, the village's population was 949 in 261 households. The following census in 2011 counted 905 people in 276 households. The 2016 census measured the population of the village as 839 people in 297 households.
