= Shirayeh, Rasht =

Village in Gilan province, Iran

Shirayeh Persian: شيرايه
- Village
- Location within Iran
- Coordinates: 37°19′56″N 49°47′20″E
- Country: Iran
- Province: Gilan
- County: Rasht
- District: Kuchesfahan
- Rural District: Kenar Sar

Population (2016)
  - Total: 761
- Time zone: UTC+3:30 (IRST)

Shirayeh (Persian: شيرايه) (Note: Also romanized as Shīrāyeh) is a village in Kenar Sar Rural District of Kuchesfahan District in Rasht County, Gilan province, Iran.

== Demographics ==
=== Population ===
At the time of the 2006 National Census, the village's population was 990 in 292 households. The following census in 2011 counted 839 people in 283 households. The 2016 census measured the population of the village as 761 people in 272 households.
