= Ahmad Sara, Gilan =

Village in Gilan province, Iran

Ahmad Sara Persian: احمدسرا
- Village
- Country: Iran
- Province: Gilan
- County: Rasht
- District: Kuchesfahan
- Rural District: Balasbaneh

Population (2016)
  - Total: 50
- Time zone: UTC+3:30 (IRST)

Ahmad Sara (Persian: احمدسرا) (Note: Also romanized as Aḩmad Sarā) is a village in Balasbaneh Rural District of Kuchesfahan District in Rasht County, Gilan province, Iran.

== Demographics ==
=== Population ===
At the time of the 2006 National Census, the village's population was 47 in 13 households. The following census in 2011 counted 53 people in 17 households. The 2016 census measured the population of the village as 50 people in 17 households.
