= Bala Mahalleh-ye Barka Deh =

Village in Gilan province, Iran

Bala Mahalleh-ye Barka Deh Persian: بالامحله بركاده
- Village
- Location within Iran
- Coordinates: 37°17′38″N 49°44′42″E
- Country: Iran
- Province: Gilan
- County: Rasht
- District: Kuchesfahan
- Rural District: Balasbaneh

Population (2016)
  - Total: 293
- Time zone: UTC+3:30 (IRST)

Bala Mahalleh-ye Barka Deh (Persian: بالامحله بركاده) (Note: Also romanized as Bālā Maḩalleh-ye Barkā Deh; also known as Barkādeh and Bozkāh Deh) is a village in Balasbaneh Rural District of Kuchesfahan District in Rasht County, Gilan province, Iran.

== Demographics ==
=== Population ===
At the time of the 2006 National Census, the village's population was 362 in 107 households. The following census in 2011 counted 330 people in 99 households. The 2016 census measured the population of the village as 293 people in 106 households.
