= Emamzadeh Hashem, Rasht =

Village in Gilan province, Iran

Emamzadeh Hashem Persian: امامزاده هاشم
- Village
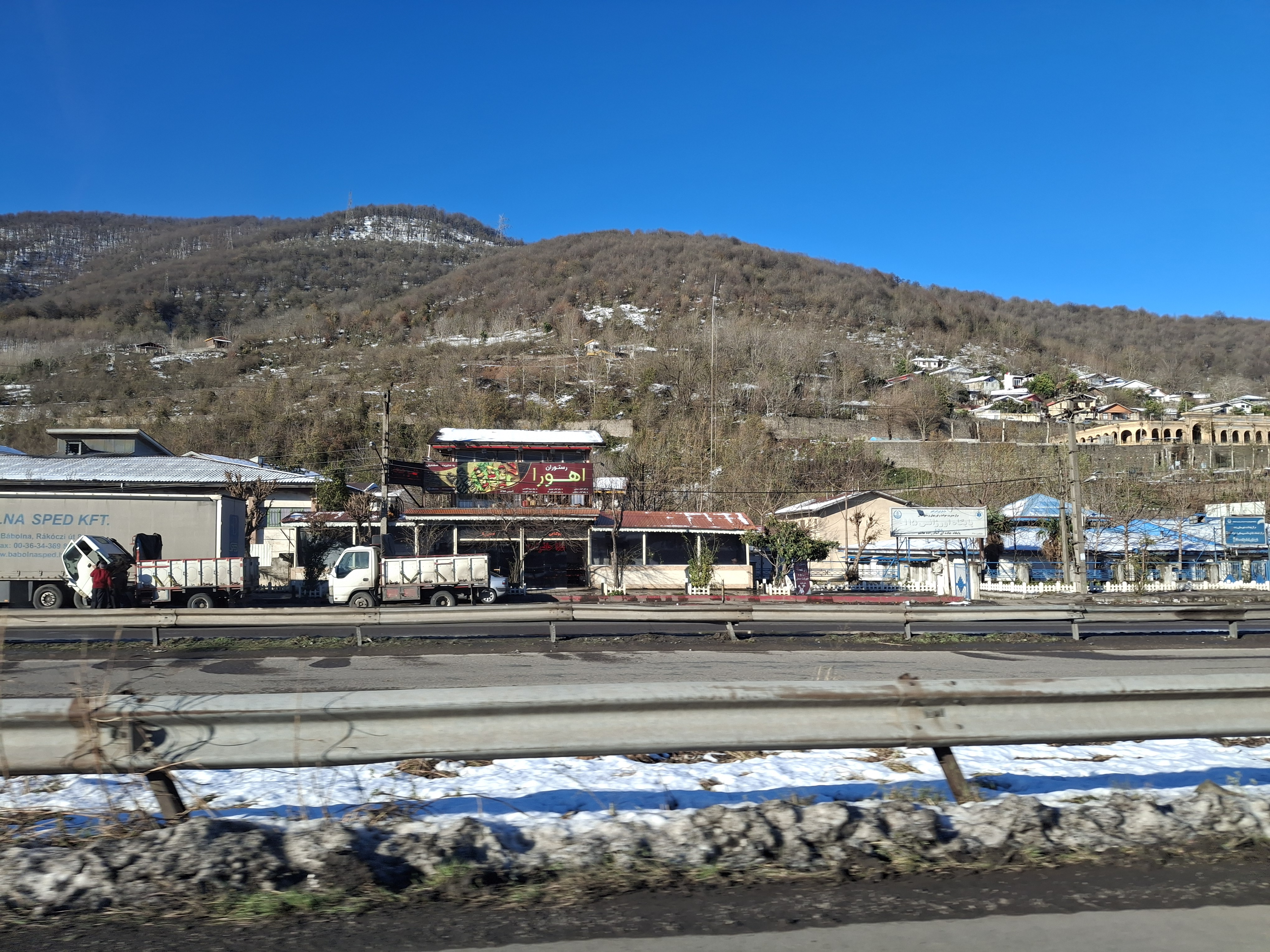
- Emamzadeh Hashem in winter

- Location within Iran
- Coordinates: 37°01′16″N 49°37′14″E
- Country: Iran
- Province: Gilan
- County: Rasht
- District: Sangar
- Rural District: Saravan

Population (2016)
  - Total: 2,286
- Time zone: UTC+3:30 (IRST)

Emamzadeh Hashem (Persian: امامزاده هاشم) (Note: Also romanized as Emāmzādeh Hāshem; also known as Imāmzādeh Hashim and Imamzadekh-Gashim) is a village in Saravan Rural District of Sangar District in Rasht County, Gilan province, Iran.

== Demographics ==
=== Population ===
At the time of the 2006 National Census, the village's population was 2,395 in 662 households. The following census in 2011 counted 2,437 people in 730 households. The 2016 census measured the population of the village as 2,286 people in 740 households.
