= Garaku, Rasht =

Village in Gilan province, Iran

Garaku Persian: گراكو
- Village
- Location within Iran
- Coordinates: 37°17′54″N 49°46′51″E
- Country: Iran
- Province: Gilan
- County: Rasht
- District: Kuchesfahan
- Rural District: Kenar Sar

Population (2016)
  - Total: 352
- Time zone: UTC+3:30 (IRST)

Garaku (Persian: گراكو) (Note: Also romanized as Garākū) is a village in Kenar Sar Rural District of Kuchesfahan District in Rasht County, Gilan province, Iran.

== Demographics ==
=== Population ===
At the time of the 2006 National Census, the village's population was 379 in 111 households. The following census in 2011 counted 408 people in 140 households. The 2016 census measured the population of the village as 352 people in 125 households.
