= Kuchesfahan =

City in Gilan province, Iran

Kuchesfahan كوچصفهان
- City
- Location within Iran
- Coordinates: 37°16′42″N 49°46′22″E
- Country: Iran
- Province: Gilan
- County: Rasht
- District: Kuchesfahan

Population (2016)
  - Total: 10,026
- Time zone: UTC+3:30 (IRST)
- Area code: +98-132

Kuchesfahan (Persian: كوچصفهان [kuːtʃesfæˈhɒːn]) or Kochesfahan (Gilaki: [kʊtʃesfəˈhən]) (Note: Also romanized as Kūcheşfahān and Kuch-i-Isfahān; also known as Kushk-Isfagan.) is a city in, and the capital of, Kuchesfahan District of Rasht County, Gilan province, Iran.

== Etymology ==
Some etymologists believe that in the past, a number of people from Isfahan had migrated to this city, therefore it was named Kuch-e Esfahān. Kuch is Persian (and Gilaki) for migration, and Kuch-e Esfahān means The Esfahān Migration.

Some other believe that in the Safavid era, when Isfahan was the capital of Iran, as Kuchesfahān was governmentally similar to Isfahan, people called it Kuche Esfahān. Kuche is Gilaaki for small, and Kuche Esfahān means The Small Isfahan.

== History ==
Kuchesfahan is an historical city dating back to the Sassanian era. The most famous historical site of the city is the Murghāne Purt bridge. Also, there are some religious monuments in the city.

== Demographics ==
=== Language ===
The people speak Gilaki and Persian.

=== Population ===
At the time of the 2006 National Census, the city's population was 8,351 in 2,463 households. The following census in 2011 counted 9,450 people in 3,039 households. The 2016 census measured the population of the city as 10,026 people in 3,450 households.

== Economy ==
Agriculture is the most popular job in the city and rice is its most important product.

== Sports ==
Gile-mardi wrestling, a local type of wrestling in Gilan, has been a popular sport in the past.
