= Sangar, Iran =

City in Gilan province, Iran

Sangar Persian: سنگر
- City
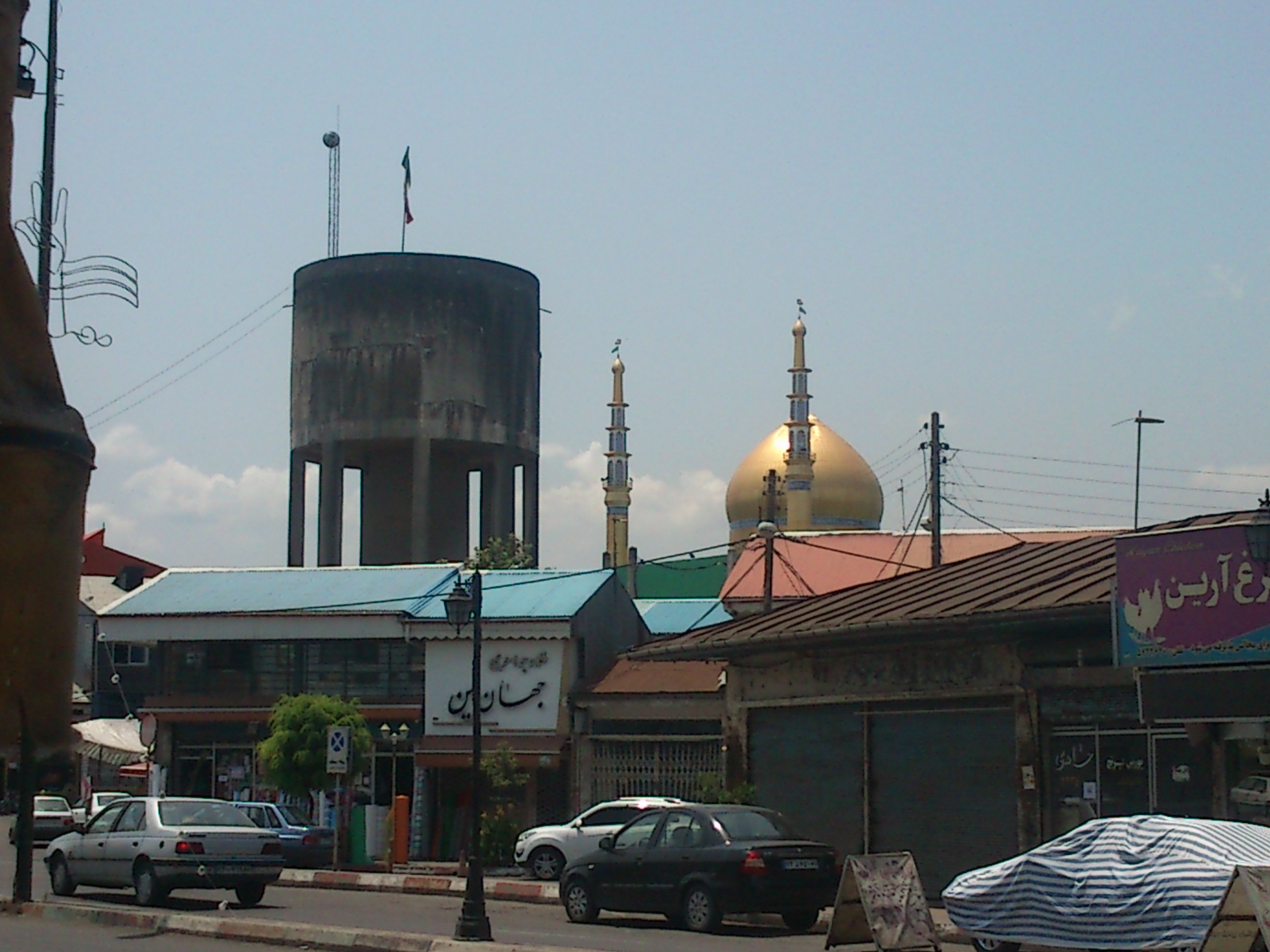
- The city of Sangar

- Location within Iran
- Coordinates: 37°10′47″N 49°41′39″E
- Country: Iran
- Province: Gilan
- County: Rasht
- District: Sangar

Population (2016)
  - Total: 12,583
- Time zone: UTC+3:30 (IRST)

Sangar (Persian: سنگر) (Note: Also known as Sangī Sar and Shahr-e Sangar) is a city in, and the capital of, Sangar District of Rasht County, Gilan province, Iran.

== Demographics ==
=== Population ===
At the time of the 2006 National Census, the city's population was 6,388 in 1,834 households. The following census in 2011 counted 10,154 people in 3,231 households. The 2016 census measured the population of the city as 12,583 people in 4,288 households.

== Notable people ==
This small town is home to several notable figures, including:

- Mohammad Ali Afrashteh – Storyteller, journalist, satirist, poet, and author.
- Hossein Aslani – Musician from Shaghaji village, died on 28 January 2020.
- Hossein Panahi Talemi – Physicist from Talameh Seshamba village, currently Dean of the Faculty of Basic Sciences at the University of Gilan.
- Jalal Cheraghpour – Former coach of the Iran national football team, originally from Shaghaji village.
- Mohammad Reza Ahmadi Sangari – Member of the Islamic Consultative Assembly for two consecutive terms (11th and 12th parliaments).
- Ali Safaei Sangari – Literary scholar and poet from Sangar, Associate Professor in the Department of Persian Language and Literature at the University of Gilan.
- Hossein Solati Sarvandi – Political sociologist and author.
- Majid Gholamzadeh Rudberdeh – Cardiologist, subspecialist in cardiovascular diseases.
