= Luleman, Iran =

City in Gilan province, Iran

Luleman Persian: لولمان
- City
- Location within Iran
- Coordinates: 37°15′24″N 49°48′55″E
- Country: Iran
- Province: Gilan
- County: Rasht
- District: Kuchesfahan
- Established as a city: 2009

Population (2016)
  - Total: 7,426
- Time zone: UTC+3:30 (IRST)

Luleman (Persian: لولمان) (Note: Formerly Pir Bast-e Luleman (پيربست لولمان), also romanized as Pīr Bast-e Lūlemān; also known as Pīr Bas, Pīr Bast, and Pirebast) is a city in Kuchesfahan District of Rasht County, Gilan province, Iran, serving as the administrative center for Luleman Rural District.

== Demographics ==
=== Population ===
At the time of the 2006 census, Luleman's population was 3,175 in 907 households. The following census in 2011 counted 3,558 people in 1,215 households, by which time the village had been elevated to the status of a city. Luleman merged with the villages of Chelak, Karbasdeh, Mobarakabad, Rashtabad, and Rudbaraki in 2009. The 2016 census measured the population of the city as 2,677 households.
