= Saravan Rural District =

Rural district in Gilan province, Iran

Saravan Rural District Persian: دهستان سراوان
- Rural District
- Location within Iran
- Coordinates: 37°05′N 49°39′E
- Country: Iran
- Province: Gilan
- County: Rasht
- District: Sangar
- Established: 1987
- Capital: Saravan

Population (2016)
  - Total: 12,586
- Time zone: UTC+3:30 (IRST)

Saravan Rural District (Persian: دهستان سراوان) is in Sangar District of Rasht County, Gilan province, Iran. Its capital is the village of Saravan.

== Demographics ==
=== Population ===
At the time of the 2006 National Census, the rural district's population was 13,986 in 3,783 households. There were 14,041 inhabitants in 4,283 households at the following census of 2011. The 2016 census measured the population of the rural district as 12,586 in 4,233 households. The most populous of its seven villages was Saravan, with 5,542 people.

=== Other villages in the rural district ===
- Emamzadeh Hashem
- Gol Sarak
- Jukul Bandan
- Kacha
- Mushanga
- Qaziyan
