= Kenar Sar Rural District =

Rural district in Gilan province, Iran

Kenar Sar Rural District Persian: دهستان كنارسر
- Rural District
- Location within Iran
- Coordinates: 37°18′N 49°48′E
- Country: Iran
- Province: Gilan
- County: Rasht
- District: Kuchesfahan
- Established: 1987
- Capital: Kenar Sar

Population (2016)
  - Total: 6,111
- Time zone: UTC+3:30 (IRST)

Kenar Sar Rural District (Persian: دهستان كنارسر) is in Kuchesfahan District of Rasht County, Gilan province, Iran. Its capital is the village of Kenar Sar.

== Demographics ==
=== Population ===
At the time of the 2006 National Census, the rural district's population was 7,102 in 2,119 households. There were 6,497 inhabitants in 2,261 households at the following census of 2011. The 2016 census measured the population of the rural district as 6,111 in 2,227 households. The most populous of its 10 villages was Gileva Dashtan, with 1,706 people.

=== Other villages in the rural district ===
- Garaku
- Hendavaneh-ye Pordesar
- Janakbar
- Jurbijarkol
- Mamudan
- Pir Musa
- Rudkol
- Shirayeh
