= Deh Baneh-ye Eslamabad =

Village in Gilan province, Iran

Deh Baneh-ye Eslamabad Persian: دهبنه اسلام اباد
- Village
- Location within Iran
- Coordinates: 37°07′10″N 49°40′15″E
- Country: Iran
- Province: Gilan
- County: Rasht
- District: Sangar
- Rural District: Eslamabad

Population (2016)
  - Total: 1,418
- Time zone: UTC+3:30 (IRST)

Deh Baneh-ye Eslamabad (Persian: دهبنه اسلام اباد) (Note: Also romanized as Deh Baneh-ye Eslāmābād; also known as De-Bane, Deh Baneh, and Deh Boneh) is a village in Eslamabad Rural District in Sangar District of Rasht County, Gilan province, Iran.

== Demographics ==
=== Population ===
At the time of the 2006 National Census, the village's population was 3,625 in 998 households. The following census in 2011 counted 3,598 people in 1,123 households. The 2016 census measured the population of the village as 1,418 people in 465 households.
