= Balasbaneh Rural District =

Rural district in Gilan province, Iran

Balasbaneh Rural District Persian: دهستان بلسبنه
- Rural District
- Location within Iran
- Coordinates: 37°17′N 49°44′E
- Country: Iran
- Province: Gilan
- County: Rasht
- District: Kuchesfahan
- Established: 1987
- Capital: Balasbaneh

Population (2016)
  - Total: 17,019
- Time zone: UTC+3:30 (IRST)

Balasbaneh Rural District (Persian: دهستان بلسبنه) is in Kuchesfahan District of Rasht County, Gilan province, Iran. Its capital is the village of Balasbaneh.

== Demographics ==
=== Population ===
At the time of the 2006 National Census, the rural district's population was 19,437 in 5,441 households. There were 18,496 inhabitants in 5,926 households at the following census of 2011. The 2016 census measured the population of the rural district as 17,019 in 5,819 households. The most populous of its 24 villages was Sedeh, with 1,928 people.

=== Other villages in the rural district ===
- Ahmad Sara
- Ali Nowdeh
- Ali Sara
- Bala Mahalleh-ye Barka Deh
- Barka Deh-e Pain
- Feshkecheh
- Gurab Sar
- Hasanabad
- Hashkova
- Imanabad
- Jafarabad
- Jir Sara
- Kalmarz
- Khesht Masjed
- Laleh Dasht
- Molla Sara
- Mozhdeh
- Navideh
- Now Estalakh
- Pashkeh
- Shekar Sara
- Siah Sufian
