= Eslamabad Rural District (Rasht County) =

Rural district in Gilan province, Iran

Eslamabad Rural District Persian: دهستان اسلام آباد
- Rural District
- Location within Iran
- Coordinates: 37°09′N 49°41′E
- Country: Iran
- Province: Gilan
- County: Rasht
- District: Sangar
- Established: 1987
- Capital: Eslamabad

Population (2016)
  - Total: 17,659
- Time zone: UTC+3:30 (IRST)

Eslamabad Rural District (Persian: دهستان اسلام آباد) is in Sangar District of Rasht County, Gilan province, Iran. Its capital is the village of Eslamabad.

== Demographics ==
=== Population ===
At the time of the 2006 National Census, the rural district's population was 20,296 in 5,631 households. There were 19,261 inhabitants in 6,099 households at the following census of 2011. The 2016 census measured the population of the rural district as 17,659 in 5,956 households. The most populous of its 17 villages was Talem Seh Shanbeh, with 2,687 people.

=== Other villages in the rural district ===
- Aynehvar
- Baz Qaleh-ye Akbar
- Behdan
- Bonakdeh
- Darreh Posht
- Deh Baneh-ye Eslamabad
- Feshtam
- Jubaneh
- Keshel Varzal
- Konesestan
- Nasrollahabad
- Pish Kenar
- Shahrestan
- Sheykh Ali Bast
- Su Kacha
