= Geraku, Mazandaran =

Village in Mazandaran, Iran

Geraku گراكو
- Village
- Location within Iran
- Coordinates: 36°49′05″N 50°50′16″E
- Country: Iran
- Province: Mazandaran
- County: Tonekabon
- Bakhsh: Central
- Rural District: Goli Jan

Population (2006)
  - Total: 743
- Time zone: UTC+3:30 (IRST)
  - Summer (DST): UTC+4:30 (IRDT)

Geraku (Persian: گراكو, also Romanized as Gerākū) is a village in Goli Jan Rural District, in the Central District of Tonekabon County, Mazandaran Province, Iran. At the 2006 census, its population was 743, in 201 families.
