= Hoseynabad-e Deh Boneh =

Hoseynabad-e Deh Boneh حسين ابادده بنه
- Village
- Location within Iran
- Coordinates: 34°55′40″N 47°47′59″E
- Country: Iran
- Province: Kermanshah
- County: Sonqor
- Bakhsh: Central
- Rural District: Bavaleh

Population (2006)
  - Total: 172
- Time zone: UTC+3:30 (IRST)
  - Summer (DST): UTC+4:30 (IRDT)

Hoseynabad-e Deh Boneh (Persian: حسين ابادده بنه, also Romanized as Ḩoseynābād-e Deh Boneh; also known as Deh Boneh, Ḩoseynābād, and Husainābād) is a village in Bavaleh Rural District, in the Central District of Sonqor County, Kermanshah Province, Iran. At the 2006 census, its population was 172, in 37 families.
