= Geraku, Fuman =

Geraku گراكو
- Village
- Location within Iran
- Coordinates: 37°11′03″N 49°18′30″E
- Country: Iran
- Province: Gilan
- County: Fuman
- Bakhsh: Central
- Rural District: Gasht

Population (2006)
  - Total: 306
- Time zone: UTC+3:30 (IRST)
  - Summer (DST): UTC+4:30 (IRDT)

Geraku (Persian: گراكو, also Romanized as Gerākū; also known as Gīzā Kūh and Karāgū) is a village in Gasht Rural District, in the Central District of Fuman County, Gilan Province, Iran. At the 2006 census, its population was 306, in 75 families.
