= Sangar Rural District (Rasht County) =

Rural district in Gilan province, Iran

Sangar Rural District Persian: دهستان سنگر
- Rural District
- Location within Iran
- Coordinates: 37°13′N 49°43′E
- Country: Iran
- Province: Gilan
- County: Rasht
- District: Sangar
- Established: 1987
- Capital: Vishka Nanak

Population (2016)
  - Total: 14,475
- Time zone: UTC+3:30 (IRST)

Sangar Rural District (Persian: دهستان سنگر) is in Sangar District of Rasht County, Gilan province, Iran. Its capital is the village of Vishka Nanak.

== Demographics ==
=== Population ===
At the time of the 2006 National Census, the rural district's population was 16,808 in 4,706 households. There were 15,513 inhabitants in 4,997 households at the following census of 2011. The 2016 census measured the population of the rural district as 14,475 in 4,842 households. The most populous of its 16 villages was Vishka Nanak, with 1,965 people.

=== Other villages in the rural district ===
- Baz Qaleh-ye Malek
- Chanajeh
- Dalecheh
- Gilavandan
- Gil-e Pord-e Sar
- Kadu Sara
- Kia Sara
- Kisavandan
- Miandeh
- Nashrud Kol
- Omesheh
- Rudbar Deh
- Sarvandan
- Turan Sara
- Varazgah
