= Deh Boneh, Kurdistan =

Deh Boneh ده بنه
- Village
- Location within Iran
- Coordinates: 35°47′11″N 47°47′24″E
- Country: Iran
- Province: Kurdistan
- County: Bijar
- Bakhsh: Chang Almas
- Rural District: Babarashani

Population (2006)
  - Total: 101
- Time zone: UTC+3:30 (IRST)
  - Summer (DST): UTC+4:30 (IRDT)

Deh Boneh (Persian: ده بنه; also known as Dehbāneh and Deh-ī-Bāna) is a village in Babarashani Rural District, Chang Almas District, Bijar County, Kurdistan province, Iran. At the 2006 census, its population was 101, in 24 families. The village is populated by Kurds.
