= Luleman Rural District (Rasht County) =

Rural district in Gilan province, Iran

Luleman Rural District Persian: دهستان لولمان
- Rural District
- Location within Iran
- Coordinates: 37°17′N 49°51′E
- Country: Iran
- Province: Gilan
- County: Rasht
- District: Kuchesfahan
- Established: 1987
- Capital: Luleman

Population (2016)
  - Total: 5,241
- Time zone: UTC+3:30 (IRST)

Luleman Rural District (Persian: دهستان لولمان) is in Kuchesfahan District of Rasht County, Gilan province, Iran. It is administered from the city of Luleman.

== Demographics ==
=== Population ===
At the time of the 2006 National Census, the rural district's population was 14,388 in 4,239 households. There were 10,078 inhabitants in 3,519 households at the following census of 2011. The 2016 census measured the population of the rural district as 5,241 in 1,901 households. The most populous of its six villages was Foshtom, with 1,636 people.

=== Other villages in the rural district ===
- Chulab
- Ebrahim Sara
- Katik Lahijan
- Khalaki
- Tarom Sar
