= Sangar District =

District in Gilan province, Iran

Sangar District Persian: بخش سنگر
- District
- Location within Iran
- Coordinates: 37°08′N 49°41′E
- Country: Iran
- Province: Gilan
- County: Rasht
- Capital: Sangar

Population (2016)
  - Total: 57,303
- Time zone: UTC+3:30 (IRST)

Sangar District (Persian: بخش سنگر) is in Rasht County, Gilan province, Iran. Its capital is the city of Sangar.

== Demographics ==
=== Population ===
At the time of the 2006 National Census, the district's population was 57,478 in 15,954 households. The following census in 2011 counted 58,969 people in 18,610 households. The 2016 census measured the population of the district as 57,303 inhabitants in 19,319 households.

=== Administrative divisions ===
Sangar District Population
Administrative Divisions	2006	2011	2016
Eslamabad RD	20,296	19,261	17,659
Sangar RD	16,808	15,513	14,475
Saravan RD	13,986	14,041	12,586
Sangar (city)	6,388	10,154	12,583
Total	57,478	58,969	57,303
RD = Rural District
