= Kuchesfahan District =

District in Gilan province, Iran

Kuchesfahan District Persian: بخش کوچصفهان
- District
- Location within Iran
- Coordinates: 37°17′N 49°48′E
- Country: Iran
- Province: Gilan
- County: Rasht
- Capital: Kuchesfahan

Population (2016)
  - Total: 45,823
- Time zone: UTC+3:30 (IRST)

Kuchesfahan District (Persian: بخش کوچصفهان) is in Rasht County, Gilan province, Iran. Its capital is the city of Kuchesfahan.

== History ==
The village of Luleman was converted to a city in 2009.

== Demographics ==
=== Population ===
At the time of the 2006 National Census, the district's population was 49,278 in 14,262 households. The following census in 2011 counted 48,079 people in 15,960 households. The 2016 census measured the population of the district as 45,823 inhabitants in 16,074 households.

=== Administrative divisions ===
Kuchesfahan District Population
Administrative Divisions	2006	2011	2016
Balasbaneh RD	19,437	18,496	17,019
Kenar Sar RD	7,102	6,497	6,111
Luleman RD	14,388	10,078	5,241
Kuchesfahan (city)	8,351	9,450	10,026
Luleman (city) (Note: Merger of several villages)		3,558	7,426
Total	49,278	48,079	45,823
RD = Rural District

== Geography ==
Kuchesfahan District borders Lasht-e Nesha District to the north, Sangar District to the south, Sepid Rud river to the east and the Central District of Rasht County to the west.
