= Rasht County =

County in Gilan province, Iran

Rasht County Persian: شهرستان رشت
- County
- Location of Rasht County in Gilan province (center, pink)

- Location of Gilan province in Iran
- Coordinates: 37°14′N 49°41′E
- Country: Iran
- Province: Gilan
- Capital: Rasht
- Districts: Central, Khoshk-e Bijar, Kuchesfahan, Lasht-e Nesha, Sangar

Population (2016)
  - Total: 956,971
- Time zone: UTC+3:30 (IRST)

Rasht County (Persian: شهرستان رشت) is in Gilan province, Iran. Its capital is the city of Rasht.

== History ==
The village of Luleman was converted to a city in 2009. The village of Pir Bazar became a city in 2020. In the same year, Khomam District was separated from the county in the establishment of Khomam County.

== Demographics ==
=== Population ===
At the time of the 2006 National Census, the county's population was 847,680 in 244,613 households. The following census in 2011 counted 918,445 people in 293,448 households. The 2016 census measured the population of the county as 956,971 in 321,703 households.

=== Administrative divisions ===
Rasht County's population history and administrative structure over three consecutive censuses are shown in the following table.

Rasht County Population
Administrative Divisions	2006	2011	2016
Central District	624,507	696,576	740,985
Howmeh RD	20,703	20,664	20,449
Lakan RD	21,251	11,480	15,209
Pasikhan RD	10,018	7,523	8,723
Pir Bazar RD	21,374	16,958	16,609
Pir Bazar (city) (Note: Became a city after the 2016 census)			
Rasht (city)	551,161	639,951	679,995
Khomam District (Note: Transferred to Khomam County after the 2016 census)	52,050	53,600	54,860
Chapar Khaneh RD	11,620	10,774	9,967
Chukam RD	15,772	14,314	13,533
Kateh Sar-e Khomam RD	11,757	11,406	10,463
Khomam (city)	12,901	17,106	20,897
Khoshk-e Bijar District	28,051	27,249	26,102
Hajji Bekandeh-ye Khoshk-e Bijar RD	9,973	9,793	9,282
Nowsher-e Khoshk-e Bijar RD	10,600	10,323	9,575
Khoshk-e Bijar (city)	7,478	7,133	7,245
Kuchesfahan District	49,278	48,079	45,823
Balasbaneh RD	19,437	18,496	17,019
Kenar Sar RD	7,102	6,497	6,111
Luleman RD	14,388	10,078	5,241
Kuchesfahan (city)	8,351	9,450	10,026
Luleman (city) (Note: Merger of several villages)		3,558	7,426
Lasht-e Nesha District	36,316	33,972	31,894
Aliabad-e Ziba Kenar RD	9,606	9,215	7,764
Gafsheh-ye Lasht-e Nesha RD	9,187	8,072	7,799
Jirhandeh-ye Lasht-e Nesha RD	6,652	6,023	5,792
Lasht-e Nesha (city)	10,871	10,662	10,539
Sangar District	57,478	58,969	57,303
Eslamabad RD	20,296	19,261	17,659
Sangar RD	16,808	15,513	14,475
Saravan RD	13,986	14,041	12,586
Sangar (city)	6,388	10,154	12,583
Total	847,680	918,445	956,971
RD = Rural District

== See also ==
Media related to Rasht County at Wikimedia Commons
