= Buist =

Buist is a surname of Scottish origin. It means "homestead." Notable people with the surname include:

- Andy Buist (born 1984), English rugby union player
- Anne Buist, Australian psychiatrist
- Diana Buist, American epidemiologist
- George Buist (disambiguation):
  - George Buist (footballer) (1883–?), English footballer
  - George Buist (journalist) (1805–1860), Scottish journalist and scientist
  - George Buist (minister) (1779–1860), Scottish minister of the Church of Scotland
- Graham Buist (born 1936), New Zealand cricketer
- Grant Buist (born 1973), New Zealand cartoonist
- Ian Buist (1930–2012), British diplomat
- Marguerite Buist (born 1962), New Zealand long-distance runner
- Robert Cochrane Buist (1860–1939), Scottish obstetrician and gynaecologist
- Teddy Buist (1885–1959), Australian rules footballer
