= George Buist =

George Buist may refer to:

- George Buist (footballer) (1883–?), English footballer
- George Buist (journalist) (1805–1860), Scottish journalist and scientist
- George Buist (minister) (1779–1860), Scottish minister of the Church of Scotland
- George Lamb Buist (1838–1907), American lawyer and politician
