= Bhau Daji =

Indian physician and antiquarian (1822–1874)

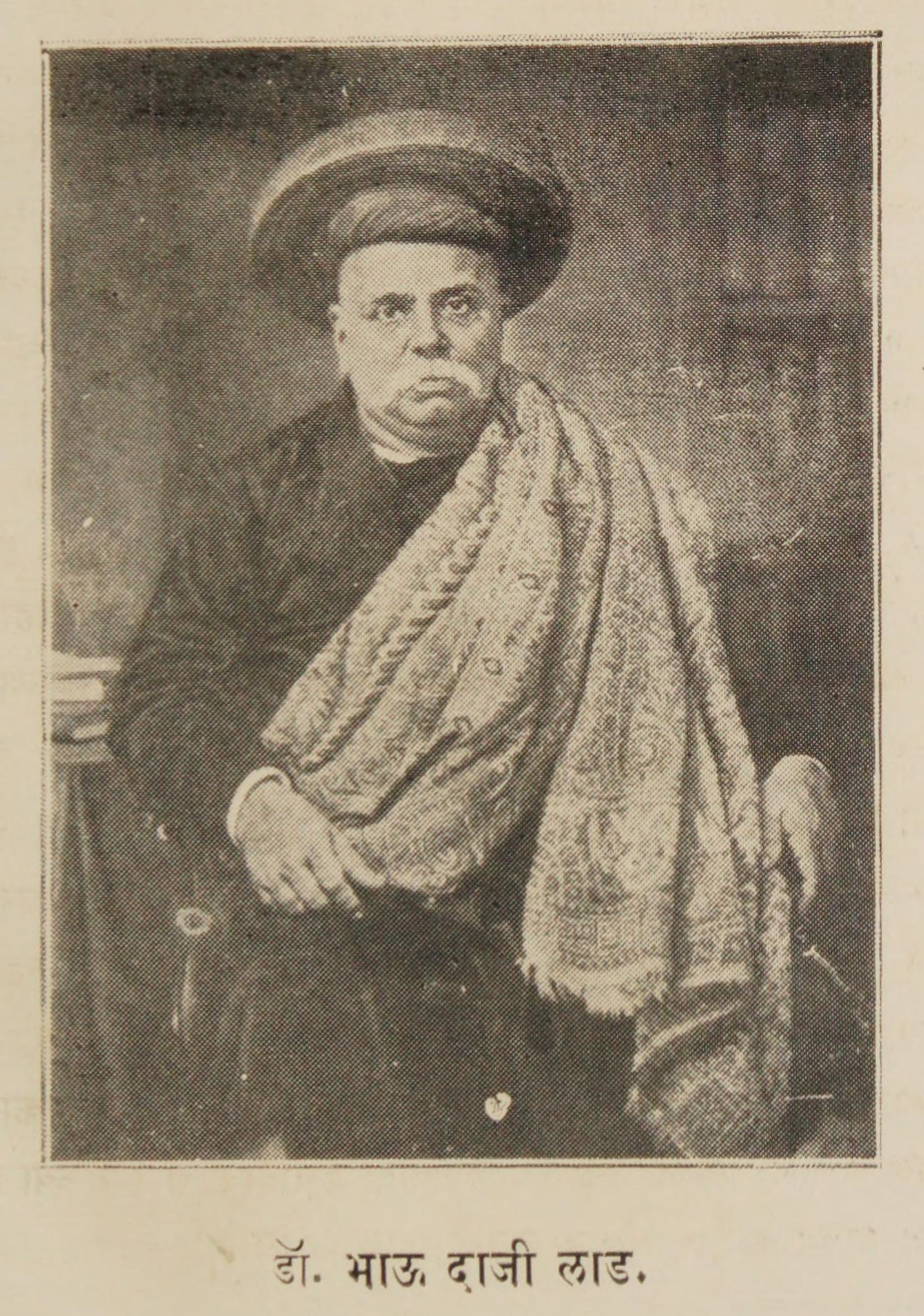

3rd and 4th Sheriff of Bombay
- In office 1870–1871
- Preceded by: Himself
- Succeeded by: Dosabhai Framji Karaka
- In office 1869–1870
- Preceded by: Bomonji Hormusji Wadia
- Succeeded by: Himself

Personal details
- Born: Ramachandra Vitthal Lad; 7 September 1822 Mandrem, Goa, Portuguese India
- Died: 31 May 1874 (aged 51)
- Party: Bombay Association
- Education: Elphinstone College; Grant Medical College
- Occupation: Physician, antiquarian, social worker

Ramkrishna Vitthal Lad (1822–1874), commonly known as Bhau Daji, was an Indian medical doctor, Sanskrit scholar, and an antiquarian. He served as the Sheriff of Bombay for two terms from 1869 to 1871. For his notable contribution in the making of modern Mumbai (then Bombay, British India), a road and a museum are named after him.

== Early life and education ==
Lad was born in 1822 in a Gaud Saraswat Brahmin-Marathi family in Manjre (Mandrem), Goa, Portuguese India. His father, Vithal Lad, was a clerk who was well-versed in Sanskrit and had even composed poetry in the language. Due to the family's meagre income, they moved to Bombay in 1832 to seek better fortunes. In his childhood, Bhau Daji helped support his family by making and selling clay dolls and statuettes.

His acumen at chess was noticed by the Earl of Clare, the then Governor of Bombay, who convinced his father to give the boy an English education. He completed his primary education at a Marathi school under Narayan Shastri Puranik and later attended a private class conducted by Govind Narayan Madgaonkar.

Bhau joined the Elphinstone Institution in 1840, where he won several prizes and scholarships. In 1843, he was appointed as an assistant teacher of Chemistry and Natural Philosophy at the institution. Around this time he won a prize of Rs. 600 for writing an essay on female infanticide among the Jadejas of Kathiawar and Kutch. He was also elected President of the Native General Library.

When the Grant Medical College opened in 1845, Bhau Daji was among the first batch of students. He was one of only three Hindu students in the batch, the others being Atmaram Pandurang and Anant Chandroba. During his student days, he worked as a library assistant and later as a part-time assistant professor. He successfully competed for the Farish Scholarship but generously forewent the pecuniary benefits in favour of another student. He graduated in April 1851 as a Graduate of Grant Medical College (G.G.M.C.).

== Medical career ==
Following his graduation, Bhau Daji was briefly appointed as a sub-assistant surgeon by the government but resigned shortly after to start an independent private practice. In 1851, he started practising medicine in Mumbai and became very successful. His brother, Narayan Daji, who graduated from Grant Medical College in 1852, also joined his practice. Together, they ran a free dispensary for the poor and provided gratuitous medical aid to students of the Elphinstone Institution.

He studied the Sanskrit literature of medicine. He also tested the value of drugs to which the ancient Hindus had ascribed marvellous powers, among other pathological subjects of historical interest investigating that of leprosy. His interest in finding a cure for leprosy was initially sparked by a suggestion from his teacher, Dr. Charles Morehead. He conducted extensive research into Indian herbal drugs and believed he had perfected a remedy. To find this cure, he studied ancient manuscripts written in Sanskrit, Arabic, and Pali and cultivated medicinal plants in his own garden.

The treatment he developed, which came to be known as "Bhau Daji's Method of Treatment", relied on the use of Chaulmoogra oil (from the seeds of Hydnocarpus wightianus). The oil was administered orally with milk (sometimes tinted to mask its identity), applied into the nostrils, and used to massage the whole body, after which the patient would take a warm water bath. Although he kept the method secret to strictly verify the results scientifically before releasing them, he was allowed to conduct a trial at JJ Hospital in 1868. Notably, the treatment provided remarkable relief to a few patients, including the son of Police Superintendent Mr. C. Hallums. He sent his patent medicine to a leper hospital in Ratnagiri for trials and shared photographs of patients' progress with the Duke of Argyll, the then Secretary of State for India.

Daji was one of the main witnesses for the defense in the Mahraj Libel Case. He along with Dhiraj Dalpatram treated the Maharaja for syphilis.

== Educationist ==
Being an ardent promoter of education, he was appointed a member of the Board of Education in Mumbai, serving from 1852 to 1856. He was also appointed Vice-President of the Grant Medical College. He was one of the original fellows of the University of Bombay and played an active part in its establishment in 1857. He was the first president of native origin, of the Students' Literary and Scientific Society. He was the champion of the cause of female education. A girls' school was founded in his name, for which an endowment was provided by his friends and admirers. He started 'Dnyan Prasarak Sabha' at Elphinstone College. He was trustee of Elphinstone Fund.

== Political and social activism ==
He took great and active interest in the political developments happening in India. On 26 August 1852, along with leaders like Jagannath Shankarsheth and Dadabhai Naoroji, he founded the Bombay Association. As its secretary, Dr. Bhau Daji drafted a petition to the Imperial Parliament demanding a less cumbersome and more responsible constitution for India, as well as a larger share for Indians in the administration.

He faced a libel lawsuit filed by Maneckji Cursetji, who had criticised the petition. Although the verdict was technically for the defendant, the judge praised Bhau Daji's character and professional reputation. In 1869, he demonstrated his support for social reform by attending the first widow remarriage ceremony to take place in Bombay.

The Bombay branch of the East Indian Association also owes its existence to his ability and exertions. In honour of Dr. Bhau Daji, a road is named after him at King's Circle in Matunga, Mumbai. He was twice chosen Sheriff of Mumbai, once in 1869 and again in 1871.

== Arts and culture ==
Dr. Bhau Daji was a key figure in the cultural life of Bombay. He was a close counsellor to Jagannath Shankarsheth and helped raise funds for the construction of the Victoria Gardens and the Albert Museum. A copper box buried in the foundation of the museum bears his name as a Secretary of the project.

He was instrumental in the development of Indian theatre. He encouraged Vishnudas Bhave's Marathi dramatic company, often hosting actors at his home. At Shankarsheth's request, he translated the drama Raja Gopichand into Hindi, which was successfully staged in Bombay, earning him credit as one of the earliest Hindi dramatists. He also established the Elphinstone Kalidasa Society, which successfully performed an English version of Kalidasa's Shakuntala.

== Research and antiquities ==
Various scientific societies in England, France, Germany and the United States conferred their membership on him. He contributed numerous papers to the journal of the Bombay branch of the Royal Asiatic Society. He served as the Vice-President of the Bombay Branch of the Royal Asiatic Society from 1865 to 1873.

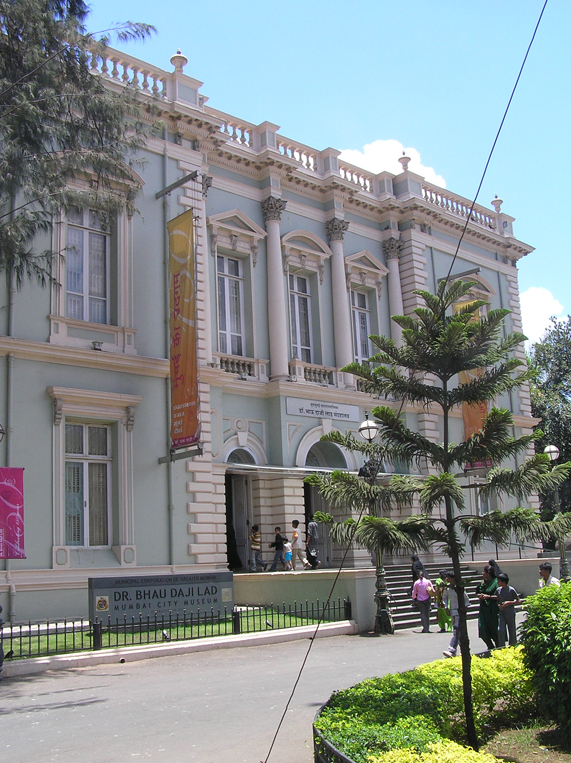
Dr. Bhau Daji Lad Museum, Mumbai.

He amassed a large collection of rare ancient Indian coins. He studied Indian antiquities, deciphering inscriptions and ascertaining the dates and history of ancient Sanskrit authors. He was the first scholar to fix the age of the poet Kalidasa to the middle of the 6th century CE. He also successfully deciphered ancient Sanskrit numerals, a task that had baffled earlier scholars like James Prinsep. He identified the coins of Krishnaraja as belonging to the Rashtrakuta dynasty.

Bhau Daji travelled extensively across India between 1864 and 1866 to collect rubbings of inscriptions. He discovered and patronised the scholar Bhagwanlal Indraji, whom he employed to travel to sites like Girnar, Ajanta, Ellora, and Jaisalmer to copy inscriptions and manuscripts.

He died in May 1874.

The Mumbai Victoria and Albert Museum was renamed after him in 1975, and stands testimony to his contribution to the field of arts and heritage.
