= Bhaskarrao Pandurang Tarkhadkar =

Indian journalist (1816-1847)

Bhaskar Pandurang Tarkhadkar (1816–1847) was an Indian journalist and an open critic of colonial British rule. He was the brother of Atmaram Pandurang and Dadoba Pandurang. He used the freedom of Press by Charles Metcalfe to write a series of eight letters called 'epistles' in the Bombay Gazette from July to October 1841. He wrote under the own name 'A Hindoo,' with his letters claiming that British Colonial Rule in India was "the most bitter curse India has ever been visited with." His epistles earned him the title of 'Second Junius' after the 1771 'Letters of Junius' which did harsh criticism of British government.

== Early life ==
Tarkhadkar was born in Bombay in 1816 in a renowned family of scholars. He was educated in Girgaum. He was initially enrolled in a Marathi-medium school, but later transferred to an English-medium one. His command over English language brought him liberal ideas of the Europeans. Later he studied at Elphinstone College where many other intellectuals like Dadabhai Naoroji studied in later years.

== Career ==
He wrote scathing critique of British colonial rule in the Bombay Gazette under its pro-India editor Dr. George Buist, who later resigned due to British pressure. One of his epistles was in response to the news of First Opium War. He asked the British: "Where is your integrity and good sense which you so much boast of- ugh! Self interest is all in all to you, and to secure it you would do anything."

He called the British officers "a horde of foreign usurpers whose sole aim is to enrich themselves." The British boasted of Indian railways as an example of public welfare, but Tarkhadkar said that all railways and laws by British were in fact "conveniences" for themselves, while "India was rendered everyday poorer and poorer."

Thus, this fearless writer highlighted the drain of wealth from India sixty years before Dadabhoi Naoroji's Poverty and Un-British Rule in India. He said that the British were responsible for "draining India of its wealth and reducing it to poverty." He criticised the destruction of indigenous industries in Maharashtra and the one way duty free trade which allowed Britain to sell goods in Indian markets for cheap. Indian wealth of "about 1000 million pounds" were drained to Britain between the Battle of Plassey in 1757 to 1815, he wrote. He criticised the Afghanistan campaign of 1838 of East India Company when there was a famine and economic recession in India.

He compared the imperialism of Muslim rulers and British rulers. He praised Muslim rulers in India for keeping in mind the public welfare of people and not sending wealth to lands outside India, unlike the British who siphoned off Indian wealth to Britain. British did it "at the sad expense of prosperity and happiness of the poor and inoffensive of inhabitants," he wrote. He attacked the haughty, racial arrogance of British rulers.

He attacked the destruction of Maratha Confideracy in 1818 through treachery, with "divide and rule" policy. He attacked the company rule by mocking the British Empire, "so great an Empire of being given in monopoly to a body of voracious merchants." He called the Board of Control of British East India Company as the "court of Board of Submission," and the Board of Directors as "the court of obeyers." He lambasted British parliament for their "callously indifferent attitude towards Indian problems." He called the British "race of infernal demons." He wrote, "Your hearts are as black as your skins are white and your souls are impure in proportion with the cleanliness of your outward appearance."

He also criticised James Mill's work History of British India as unscientific, prejudiced in the highest degree. He said Mill had never even visited India and the armchair historian has the perfidity to denigrate Indian people with his own fantasy.

The uproar was such that Buist had to submit resignation and censorship on press was brought in soon. Tarkhadkar 's writings form an essential part of India's fight against British colonialism, and his methods were carried forward by younger writers like Bal Gangadhar Tilak.
