= Dr. Bhau Daji Lad Museum =

Museum in Mumbai, India

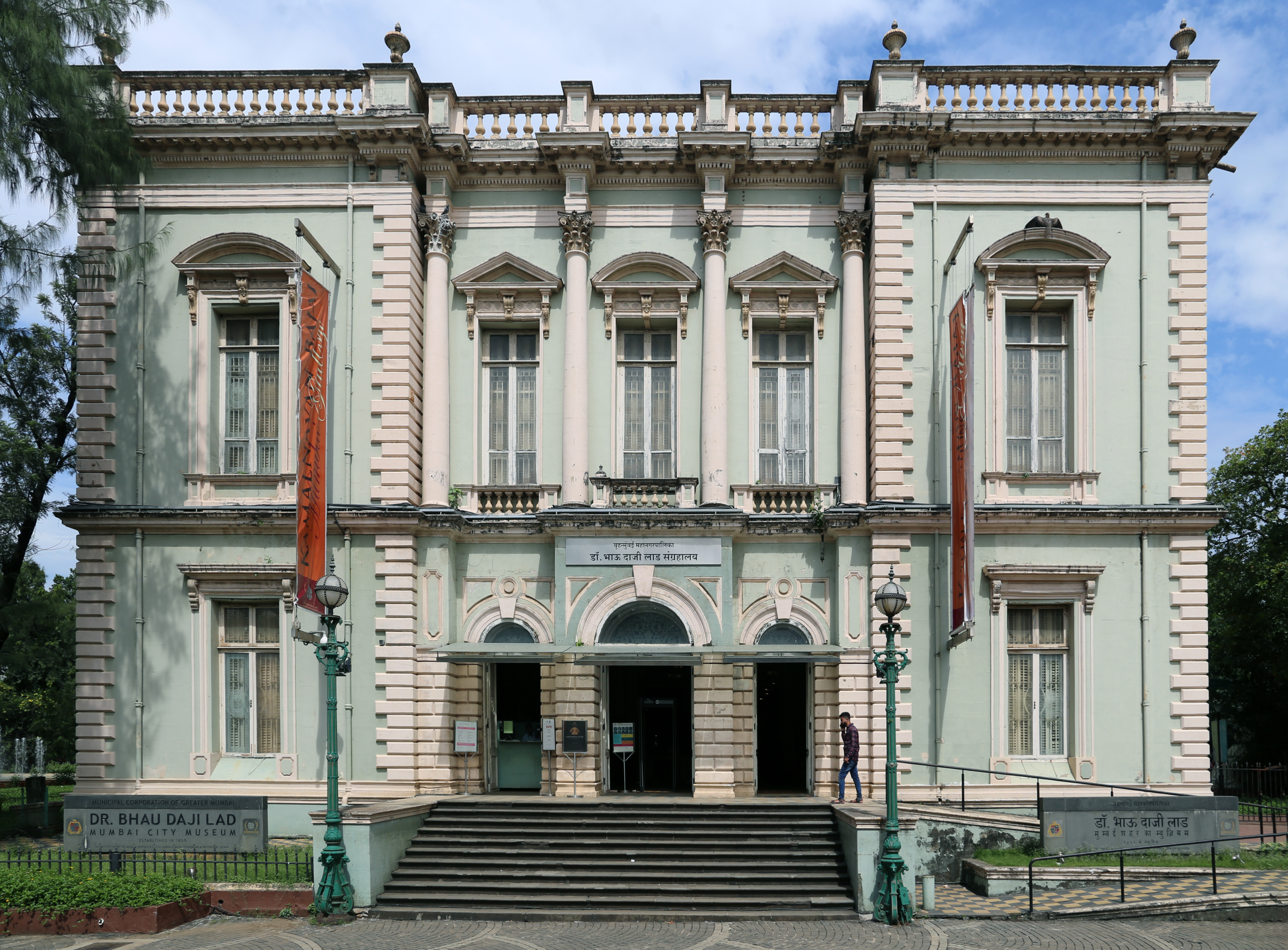
- Front view of the Dr. Bhau Daji Lad Museum

- Location within Mumbai
- Established: 2 May 1872; 154 years ago
- Location: Veer Mata Jijabai Bhonsle Udyan, Dr. Baba Saheb Ambedkar Marg, Byculla East, Mumbai, Maharashtra 400027.
- Coordinates: 18.979472°N 72.834806°E
- Founders: George Birdwood; Jamsetjee Jeejeebhoy; Bhau Daji Lad; Jagannath Shankarseth; George Buist (journalist)
- Director: Tasneem Zakaria Mehta
- Public transit access: Byculla
- Website: www.bdlmuseum.org

The Dr. Bhau Daji Lad Museum is a museum dedicated to the history, art and culture, of Mumbai, India. It is the oldest museum in the city. It is situated in the vicinity of the Byculla Zoo, in the suburb of Byculla East.

It was originally established in 1855 as a treasure house of the decorative and industrial arts, and was later renamed in 1975 in honour of Dr. Bhau Daji Lad.

== History ==
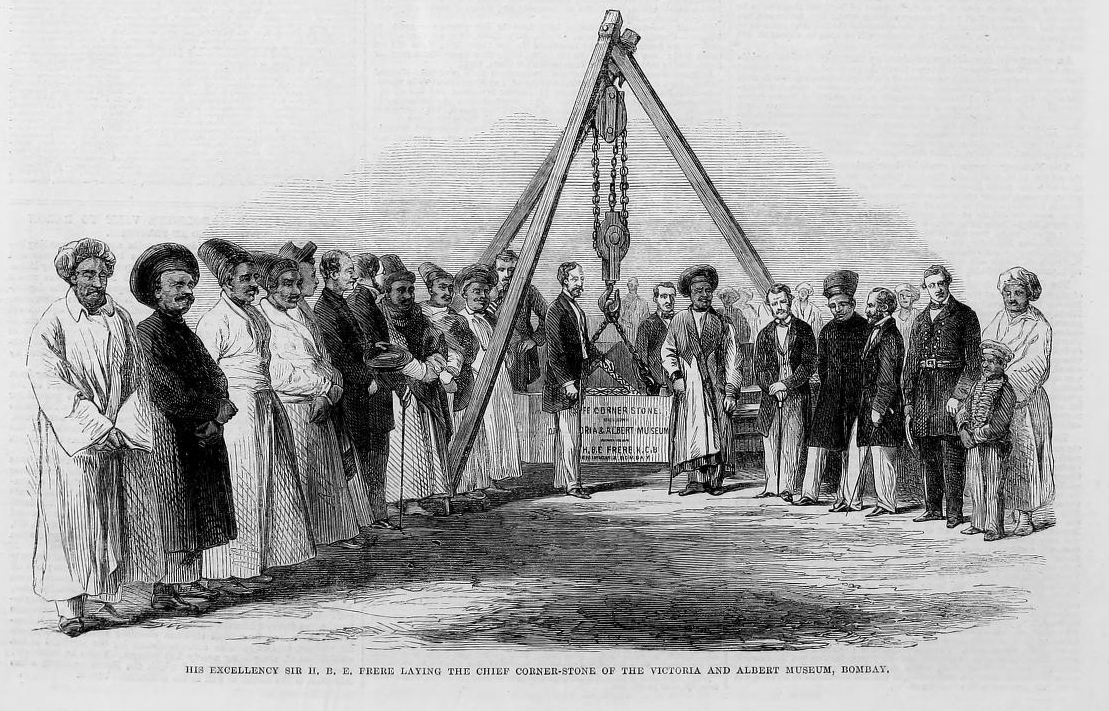
Sir Henry Bartle Frere laying the chief corner-stone of the museum, with Jagannath Shankarseth in 1862

India’s “art manufactures” were widely praised when shown at international exhibitions—starting with the Great Exhibition of 1851 in London. Duplicates of the works from the former Bombay Presidency intended for display at international great exhibitions were put on public display in a new permanent space, named the Government Central Museum of Natural History, Economy, Geology, Industry and Arts.

In 1848, the first museum committee was formed under the guidance of John Elphinstone and the Central Museum of Natural History, Economy, Geology, Industry and Arts, the first museum in Bombay, was officially opened in 1856. George Buist, the first curator of the museum, took the major initiative for its inception. In 1857, it was closed to the public and its collection was shifted to the Town Hall, now the Asiatic Society Mumbai.

In 1858, George Birdwood was appointed curator of the museum. Soon, a committee was formed, comprising him, Bhau Daji Lad and Jaganath Shunkerseth to raise money for construction of a new building for the museum. The foundation of the new building was laid in 1862. It was built with the patronage of many wealthy Indian businessmen and philanthropists like David Sassoon, Sir Jamsetjee Jejeebhoy and Jaganath Shunkerseth.

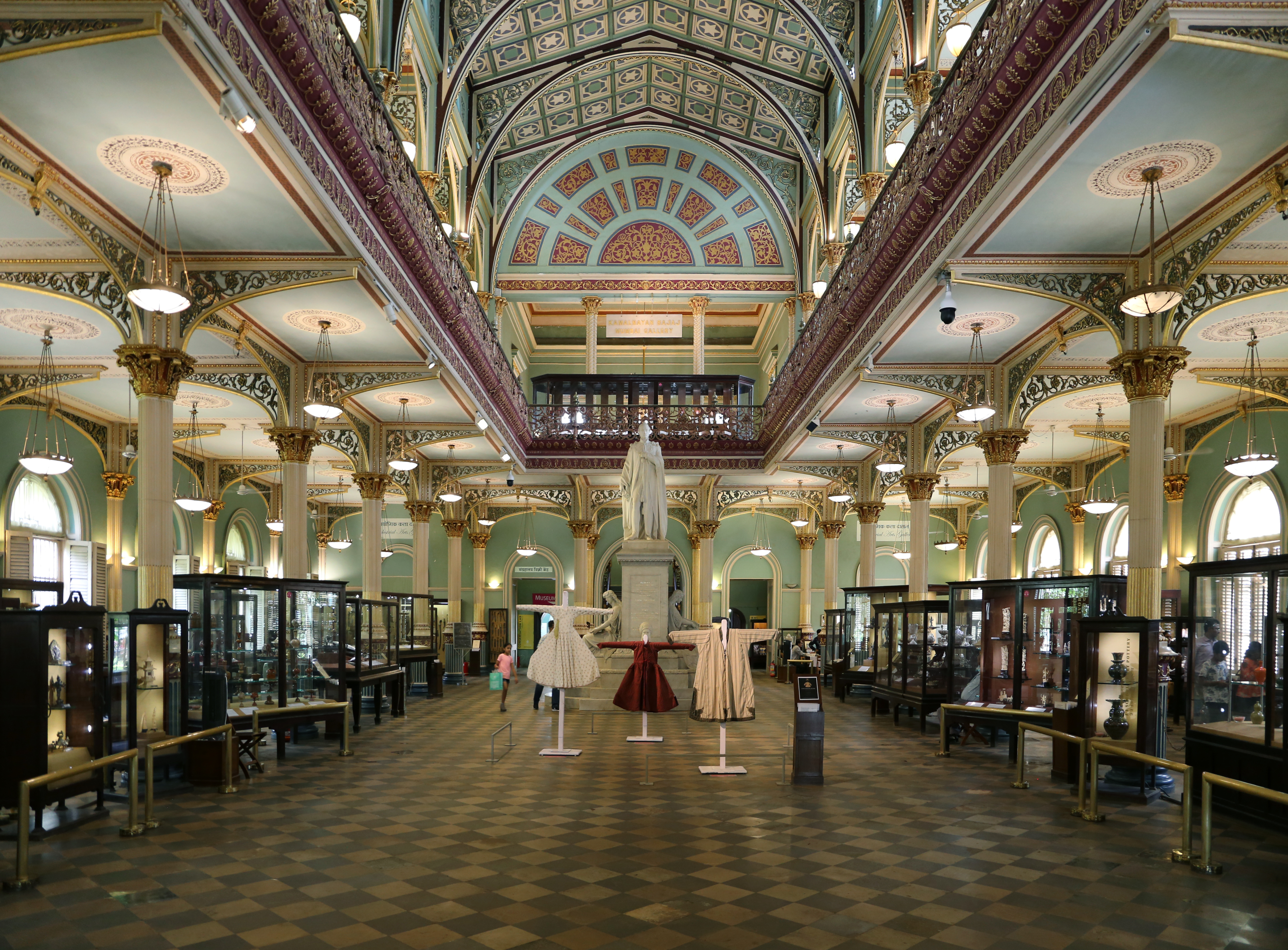
Victorian interiors of the museum

The construction of the present building in Jijamata Udyan in Byculla started in 1862 and was completed in 1871. The museum was opened on 2 May 1872 as The Victoria and Albert Museum, Bombay. A little more than a hundred years later, on 1 November 1975, the museum was renamed the Dr. Bhau Daji Lad Museum in honour of the man whose vision and dedication enabled its establishment. Bhau Daji Lad was the first Indian Sheriff of Mumbai, a philanthropist, historian, physician, surgeon and secretary of the Museum Committee when it was first instituted.

=== The Great Exhibition of 1851 ===
The idea of setting up a museum in Mumbai was first mooted in 1850 when preparations were being made for the first ‘Great Exhibition of the Works of Industry of all Nations’ to be held in London's Crystal Palace in 1851. Prince Albert, the consort of Queen Victoria, wanted to present to the world the industrial arts and crafts of Britain's colonies and thereby stimulate trade for these products. The Great Exhibition was a catalyst for other world fairs and resulted in the establishment of new museums across the British Empire. The duplicates of art objects and raw products that were sent from the Bombay Presidency to the 1855 Paris Universal Exhibition thus formed the nucleus of a new museum that was set up at the Town Barracks in Fort and known as the ‘Government Central Museum’.

=== Restoration and revitalisation ===
In 2003, the Indian National Trust for Art and Cultural Heritage (INTACH) in collaboration with the Jamnalal Bajaj Foundation and the Municipal Corporation of Greater Mumbai undertook extensive refurbishment of the building, a Grade II-B heritage structure. After five years of painstaking and intensive work, the museum reopened to the public on 4 January 2008.

The museum underwent another, smaller, two-year-long restoration to restore damages due to the closures during COVID-19 and opened to the public on 8 January 2025.

== Awards and recognition ==
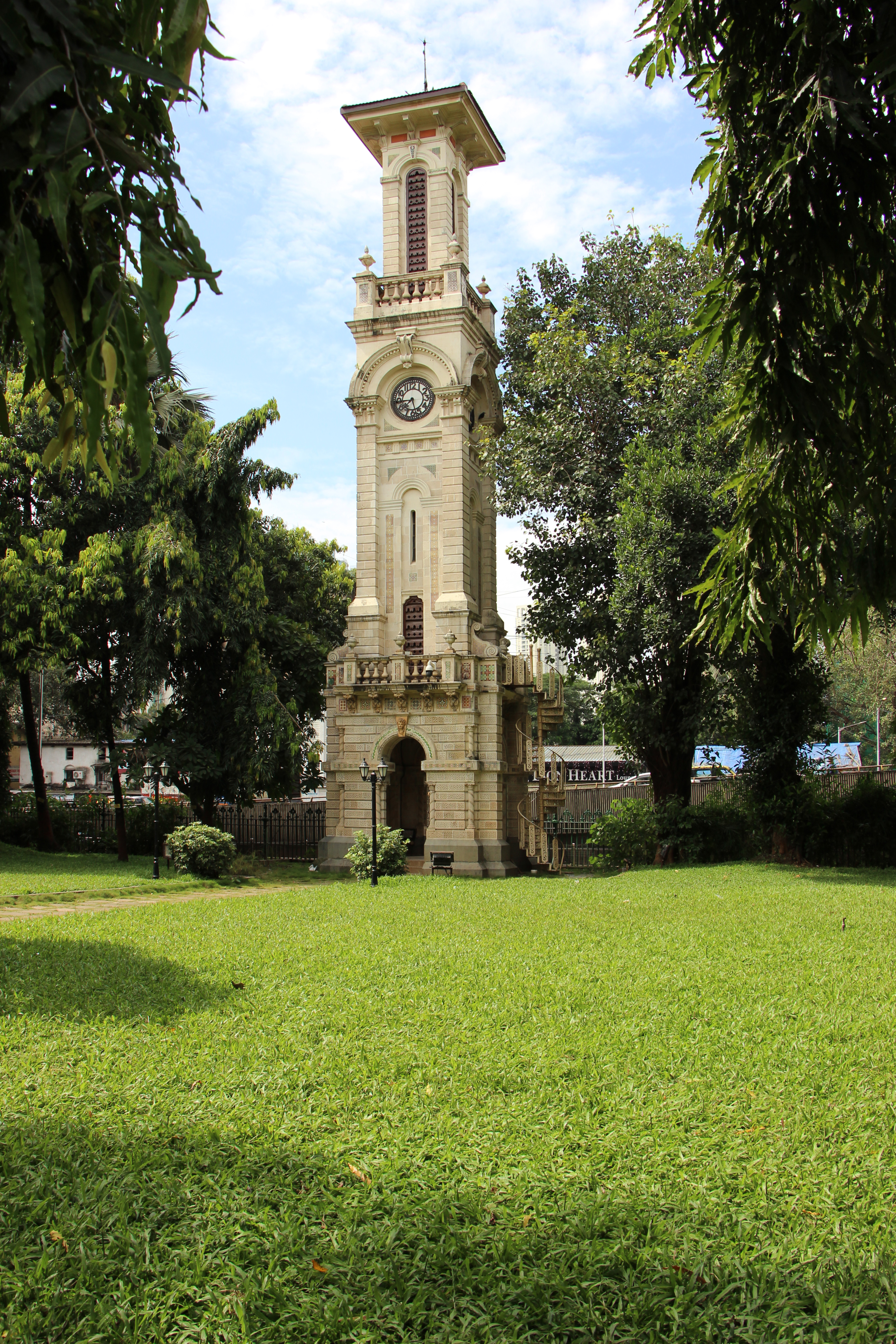
The David Sassoon clock tower situated at the entrance of 'Veer Mata Jijabai Bhonsle Udyan'

In 2005, the museum won UNESCO's Asia-Pacific Award of Excellence in Cultural Conservation after being restored by conservation architect Vikas Dilawari.

In 2016, the museum received the International Quality Crown award in the gold category for its focus on quality, continuous innovation, and customer satisfaction.

== Governance ==
The museum is managed by a public-private partnership, a first for a cultural institution in India. The partnership involves the Municipal Corporation of Greater Mumbai, the Jamnalal Bajaj Foundation and the Indian National Trust for Art and Cultural Heritage (INTACH).

Tasneem Zakaria Mehta is the honorary director of the museum and has a Board of Management and Trustees that include the mayor and the municipal commissioner of Mumbai.

== Collections ==
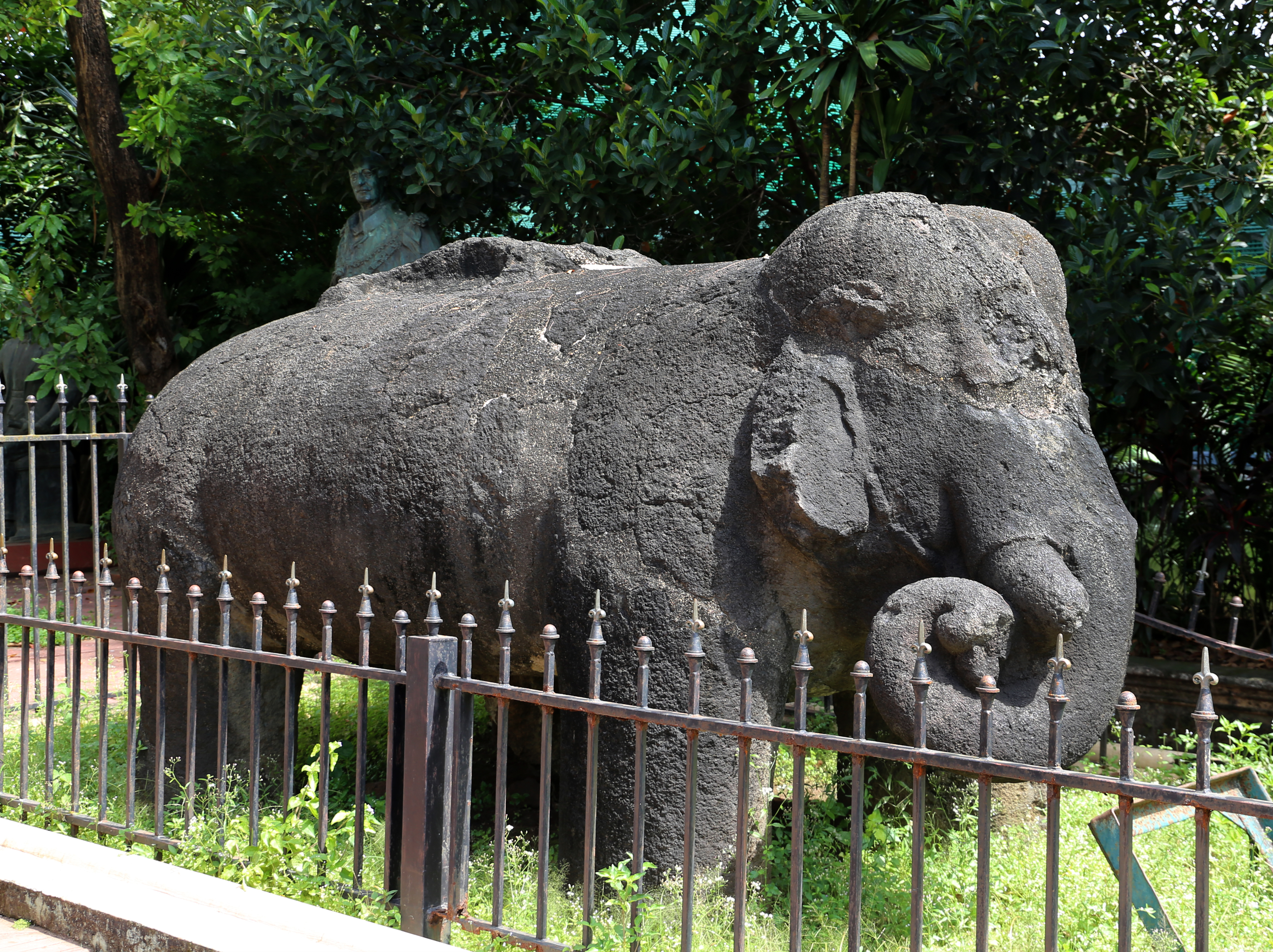
Basalt elephant sculpture from Elephanta Island

This museum houses a large number of archaeological finds, maps and historical photographs of Mumbai, clay models, silver and copper ware and costumes. Its significant collections include a 17th-century manuscript of Hatim Tai. It also houses the iconic Kala Ghoda statue. Outside the museum is the installation of the monolithic basalt elephant sculpture recovered from the sea, which originated from Elephanta Island (Gharapuri Island).

== Gallery ==
Dr. Bhau Daji Lad Museum
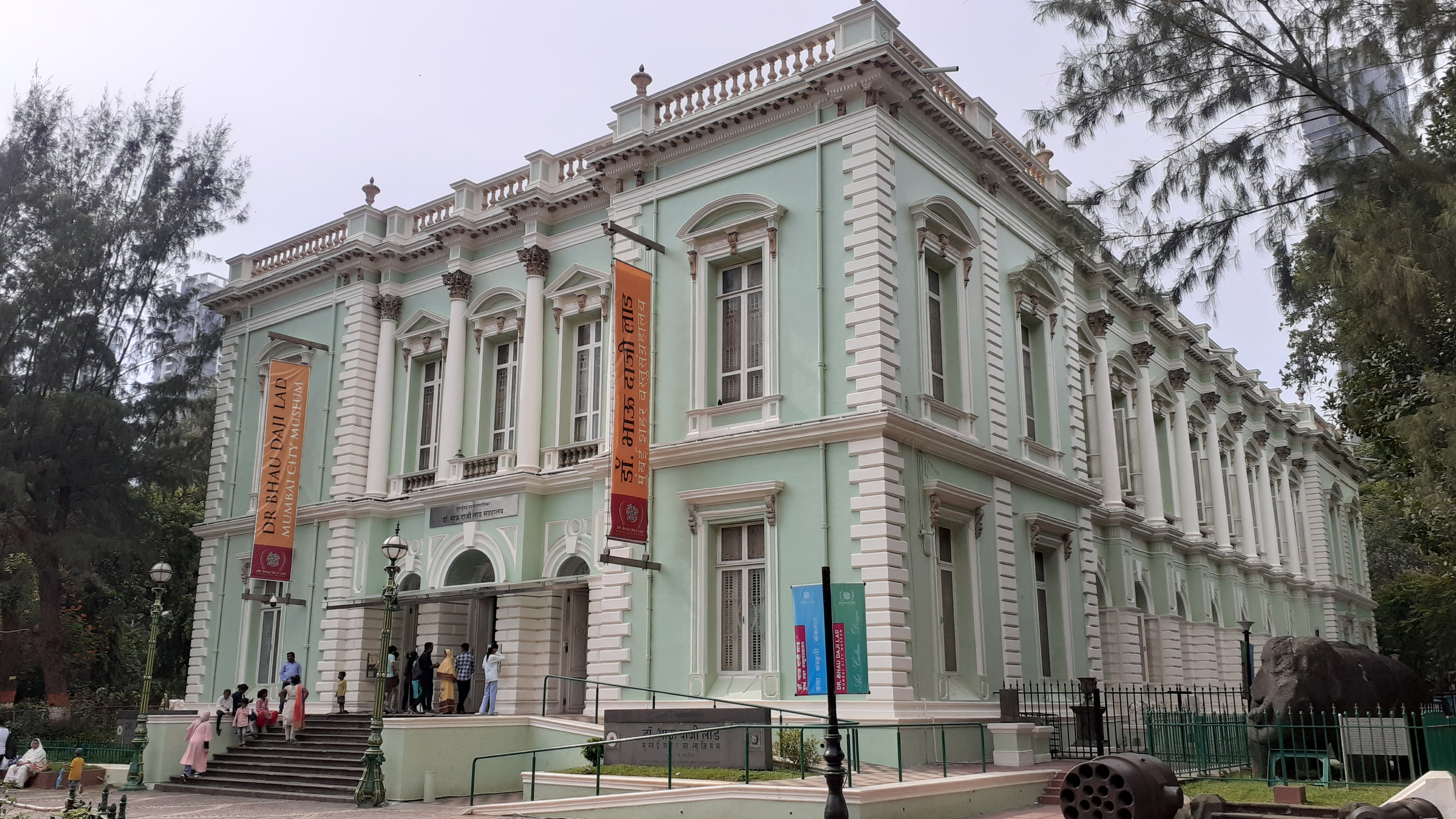
View of the Museum Building from Southeast

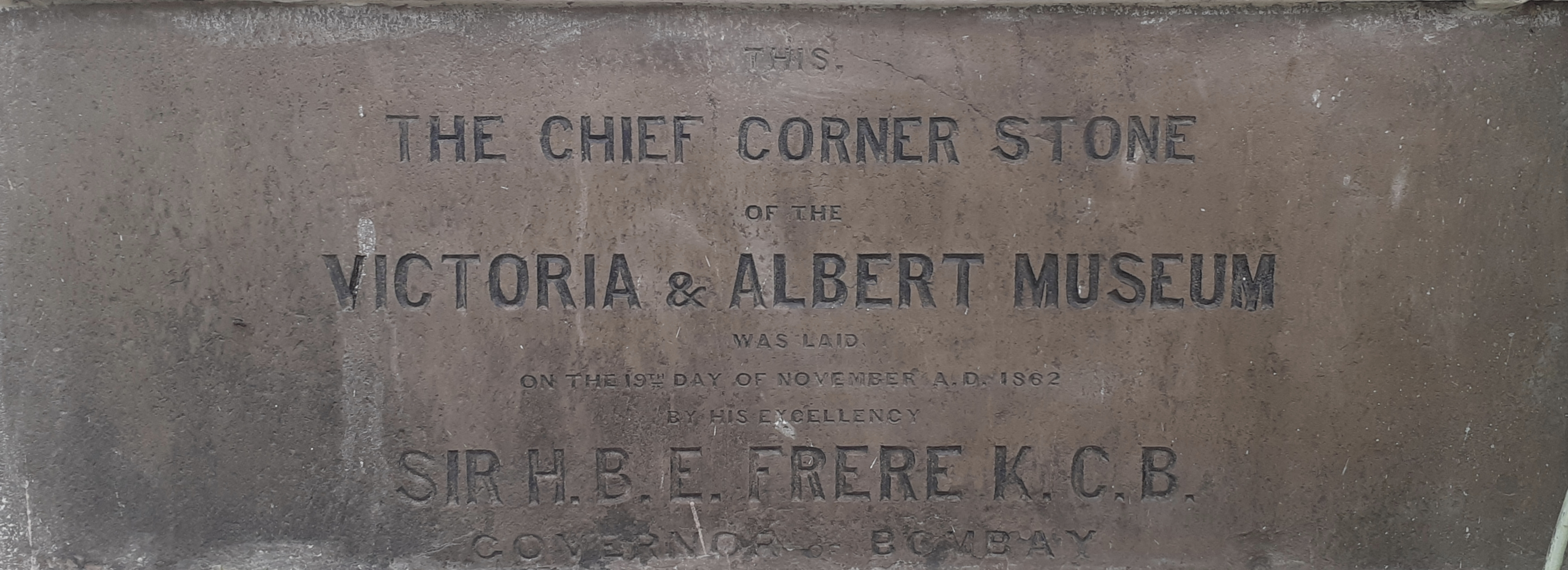
The museum cornerstone, laid during a ceremony in November 1862

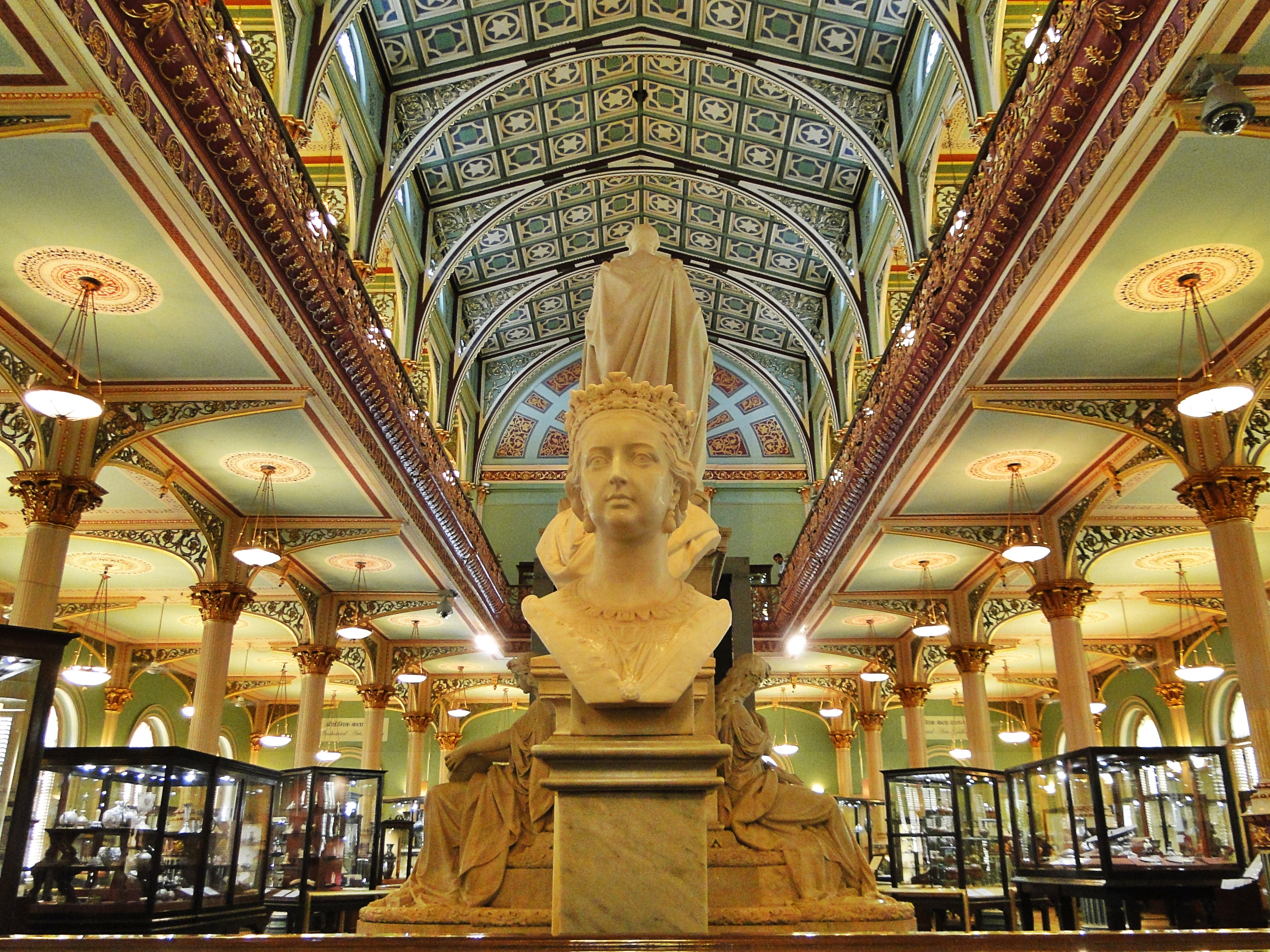
Bust of Queen Victoria inside the museum.

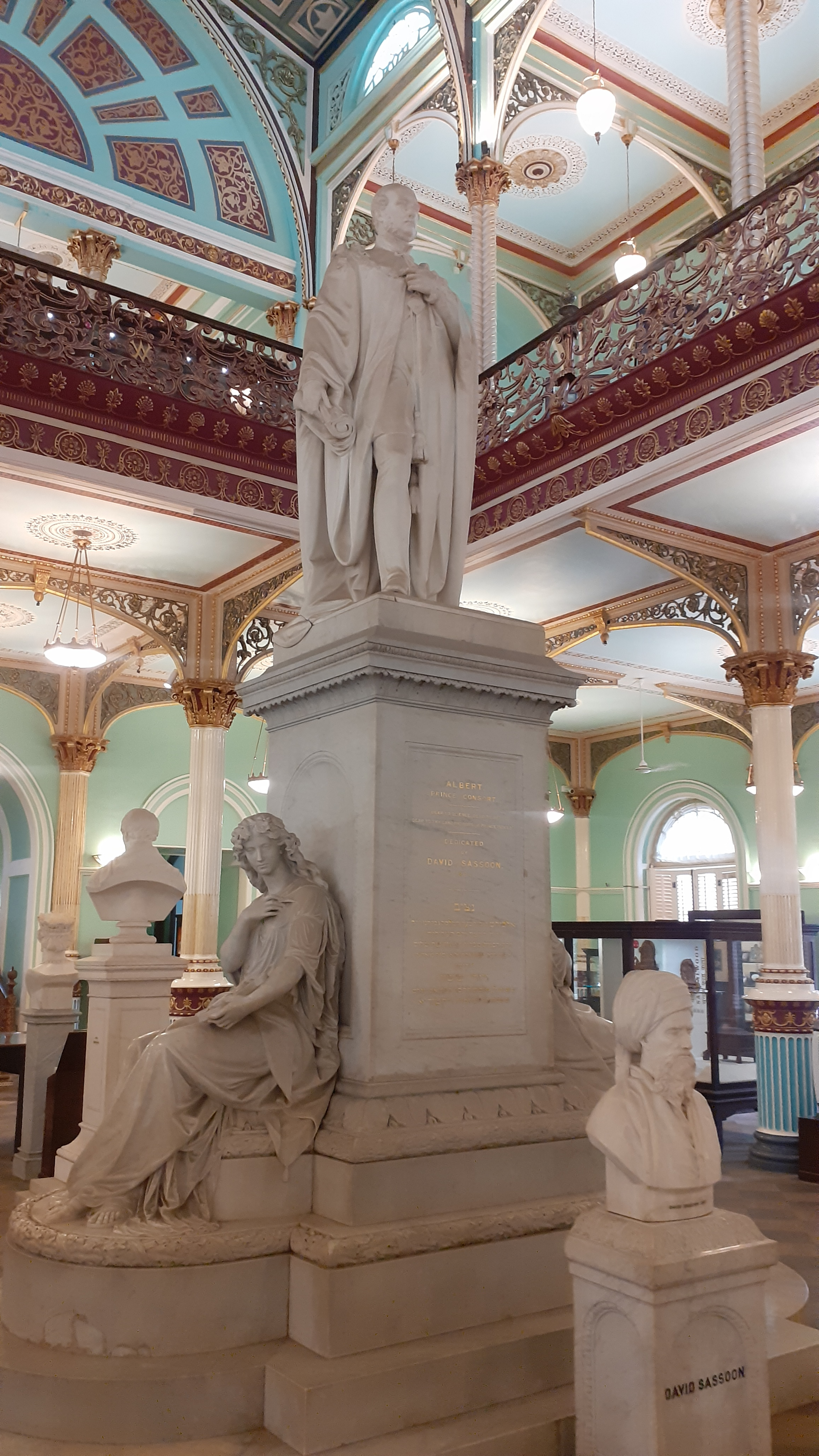
Statue of Prince Albert within the museum

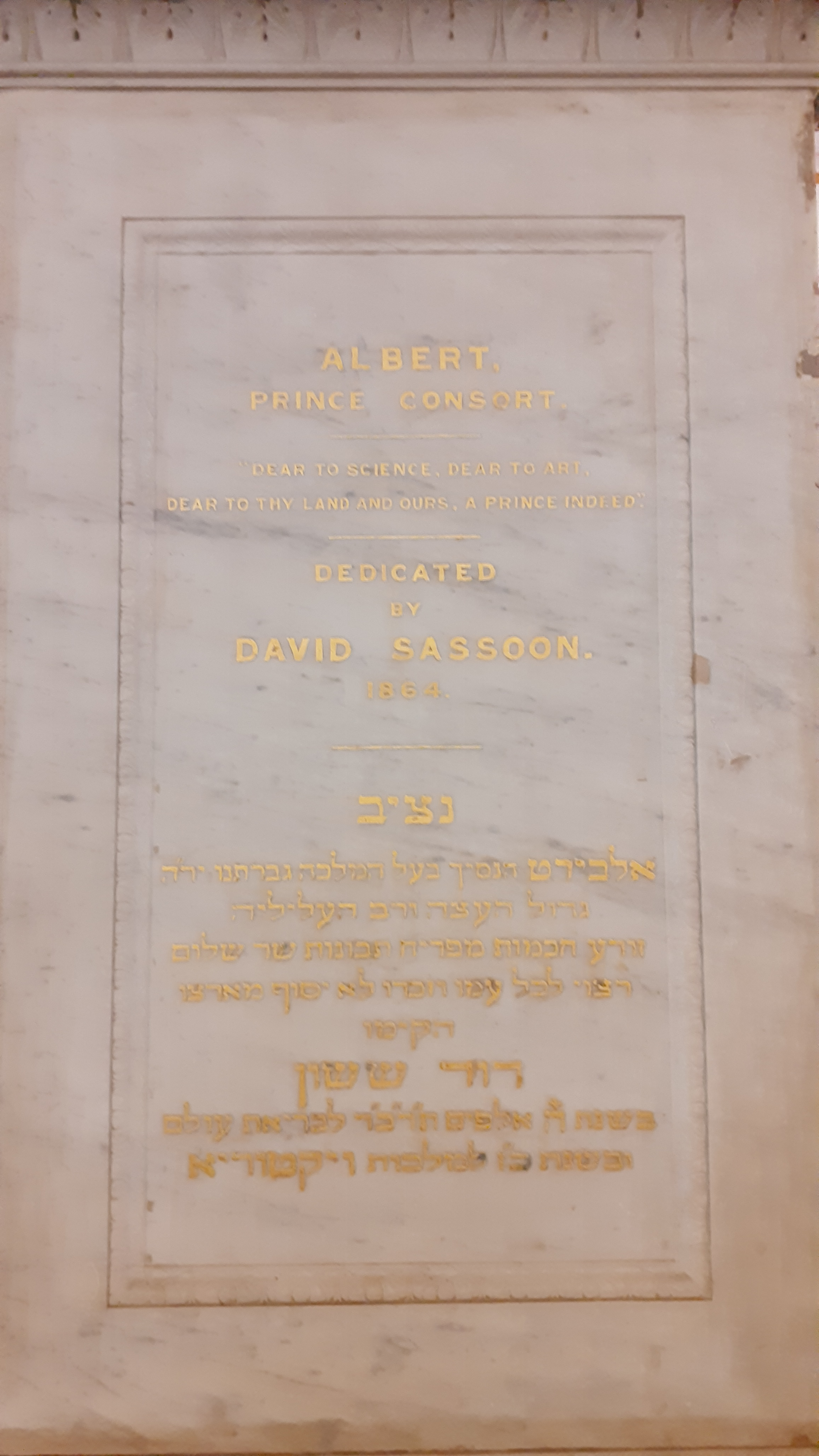
Plaque of the same statue

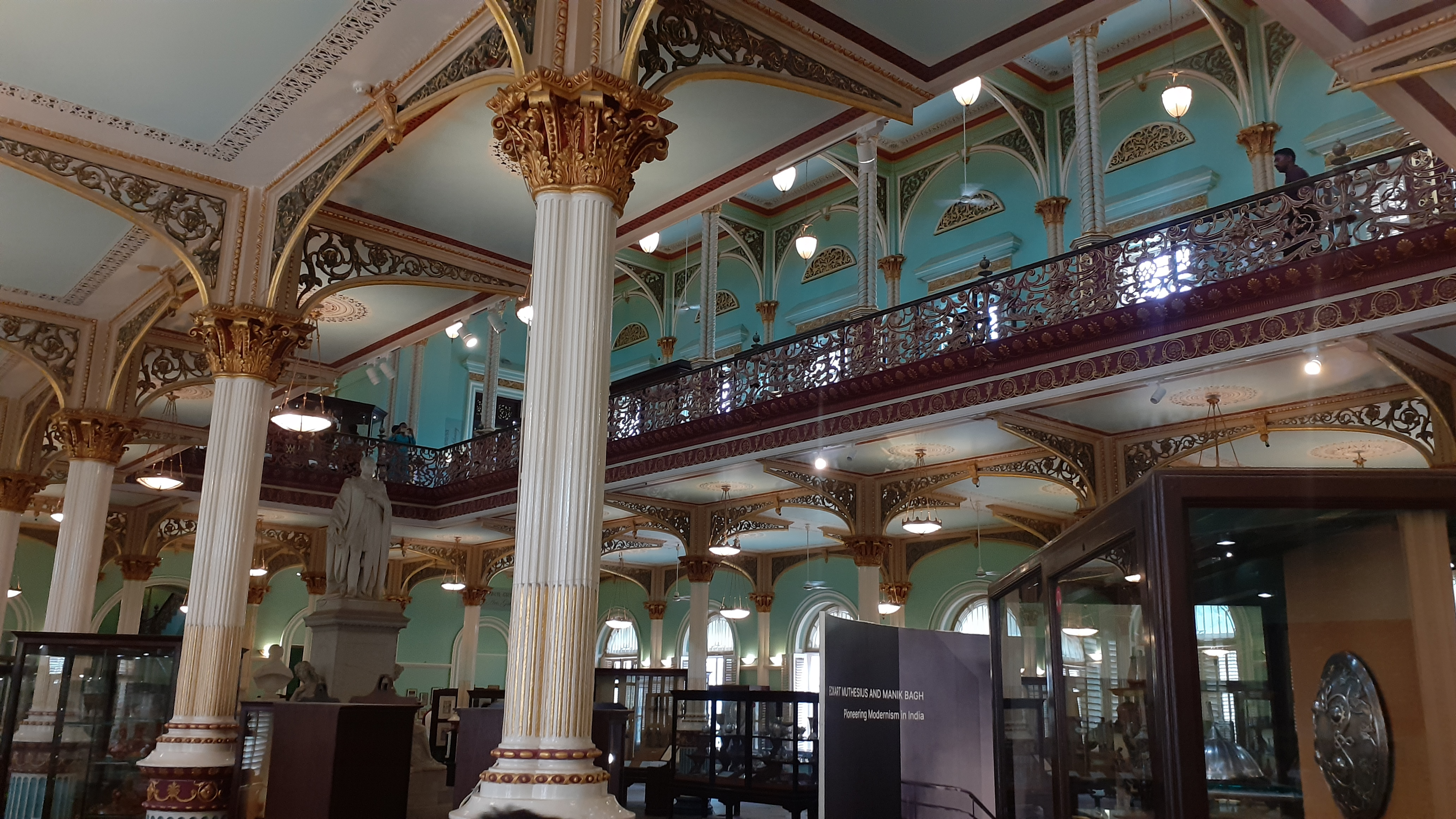
Elaborate interiors of the museum

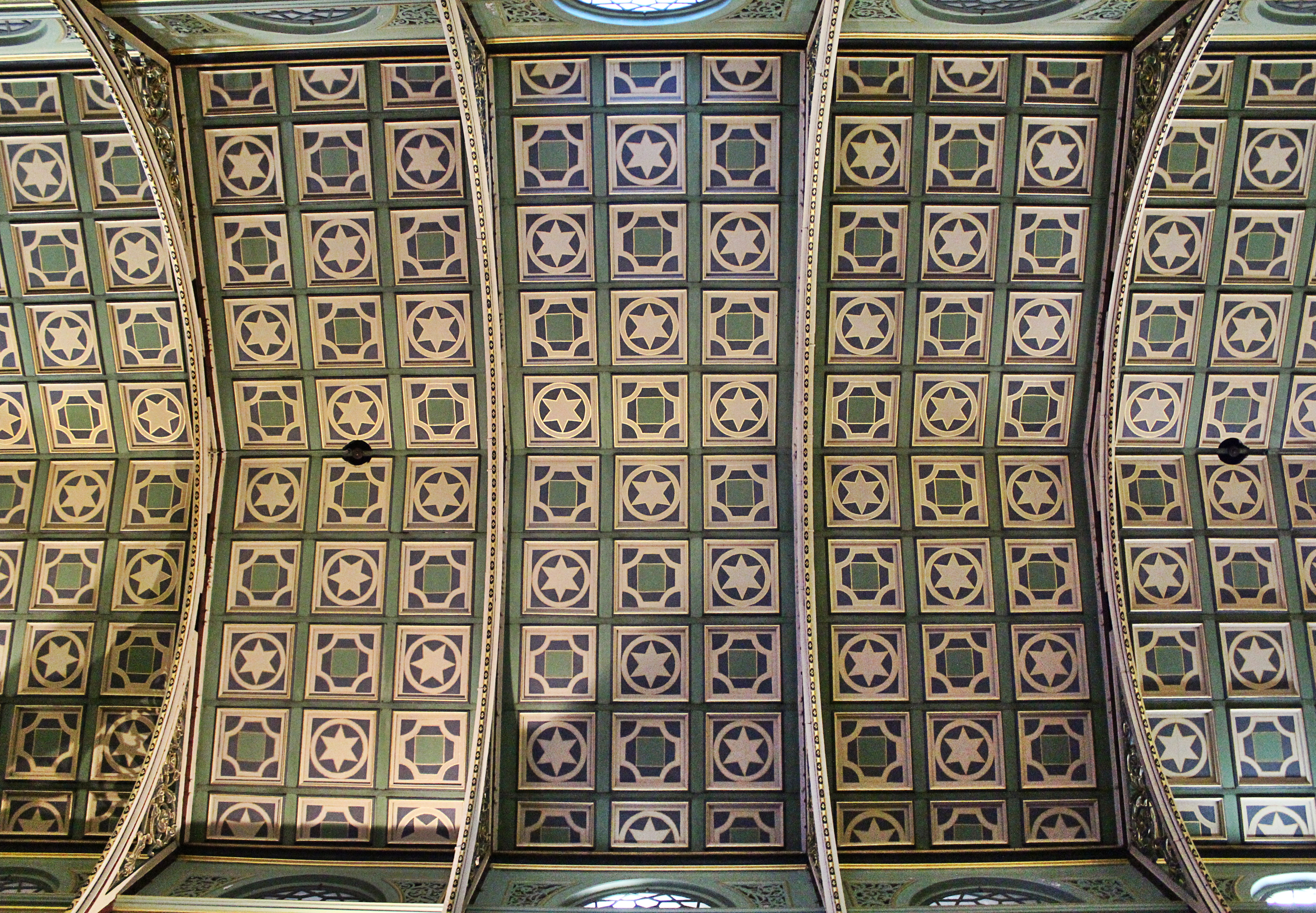
Museum ceiling.

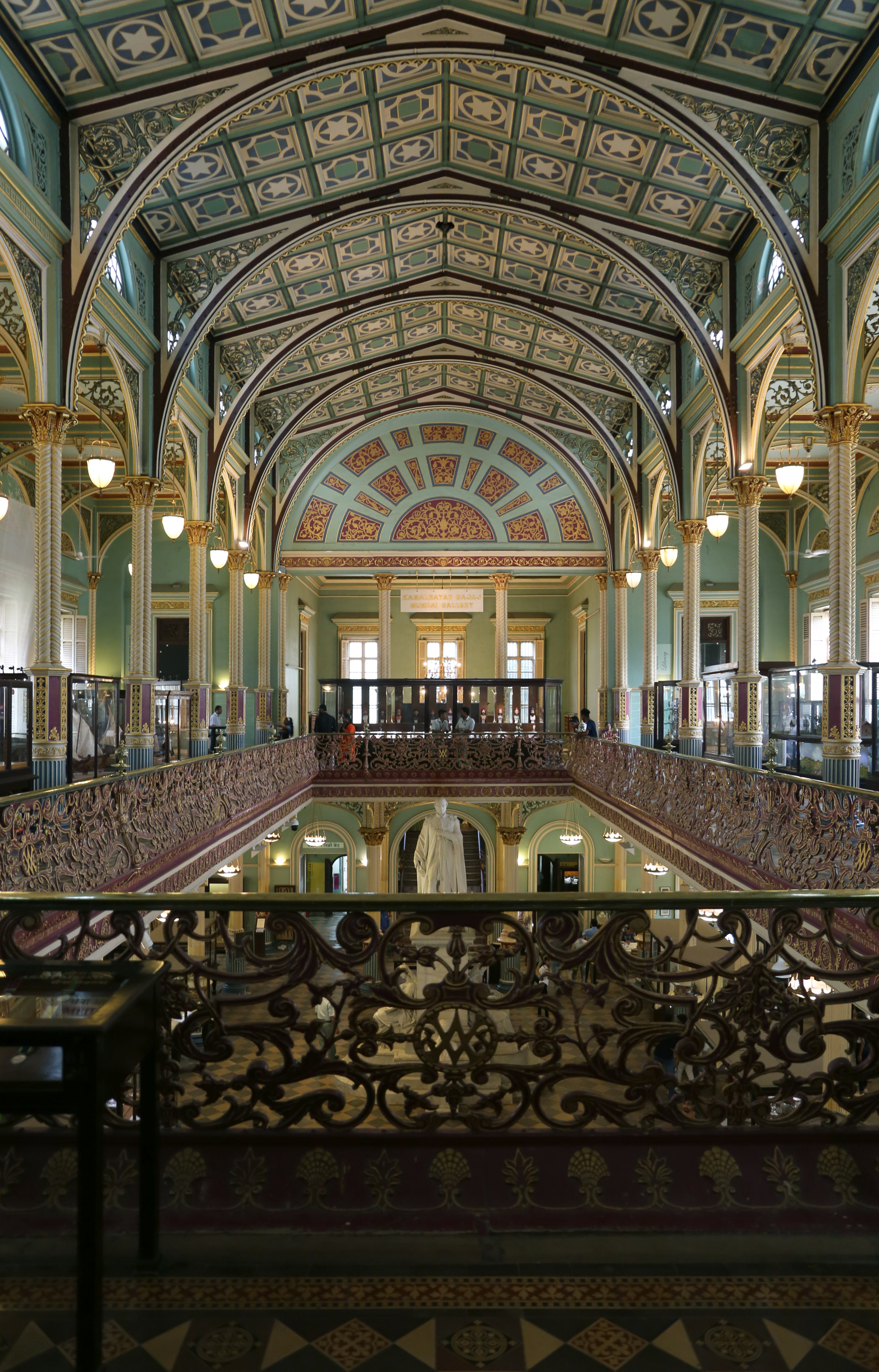
Upper storey of the museum.

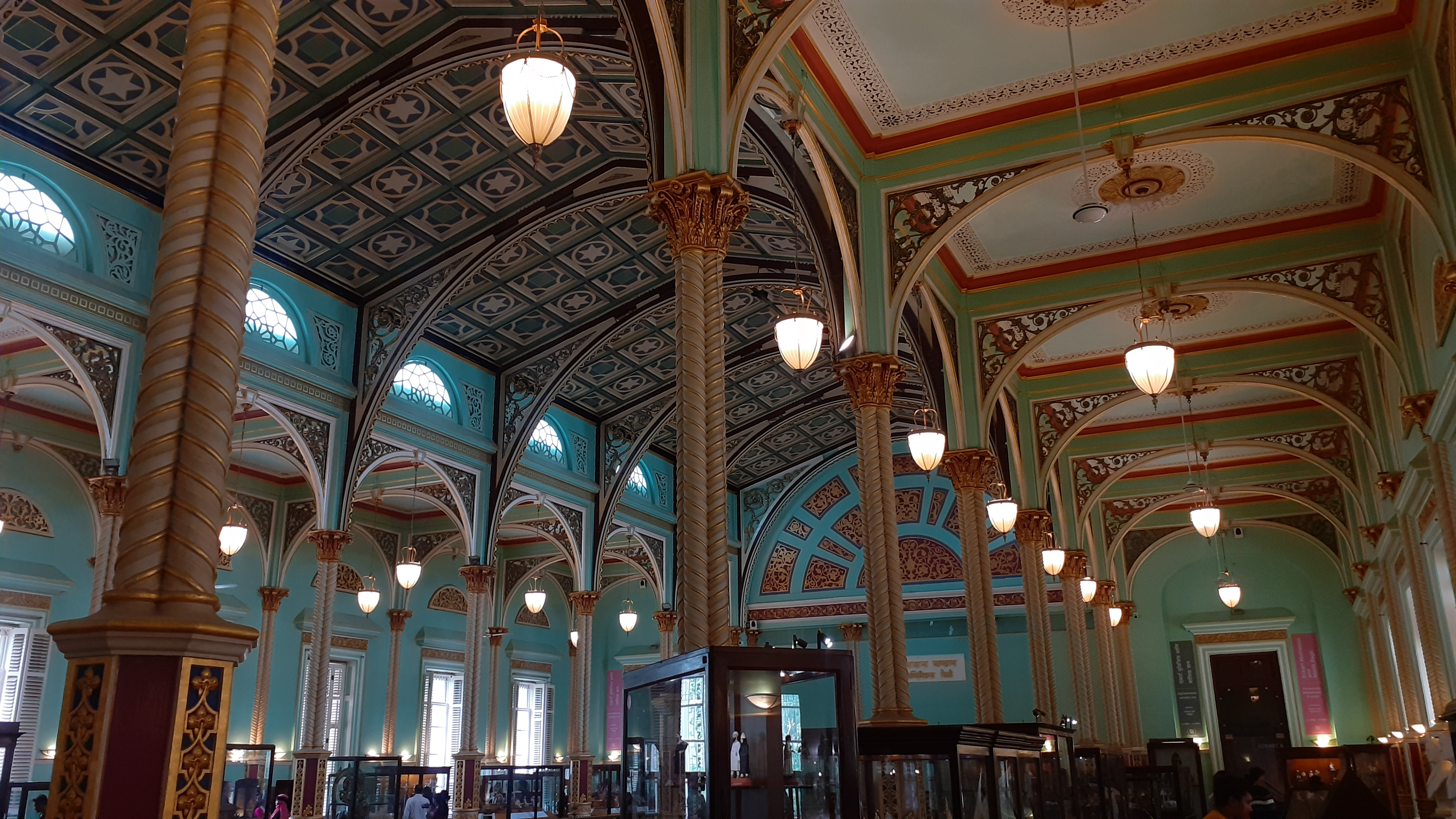
View of the ornate ceilings from the upper storey

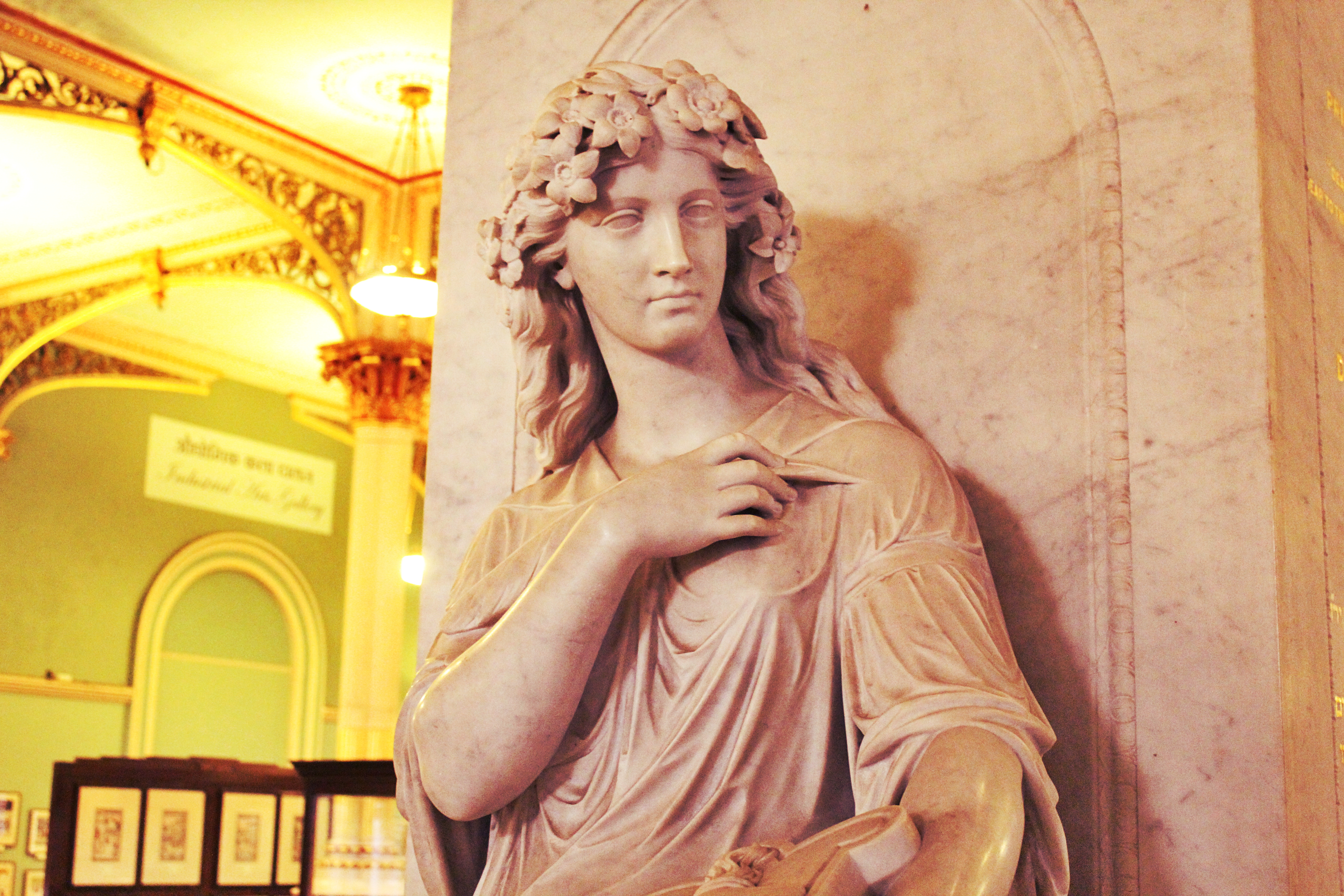
Statue inside the museum.

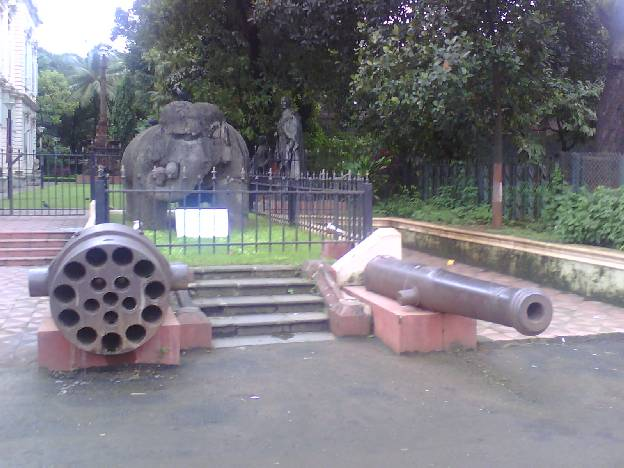

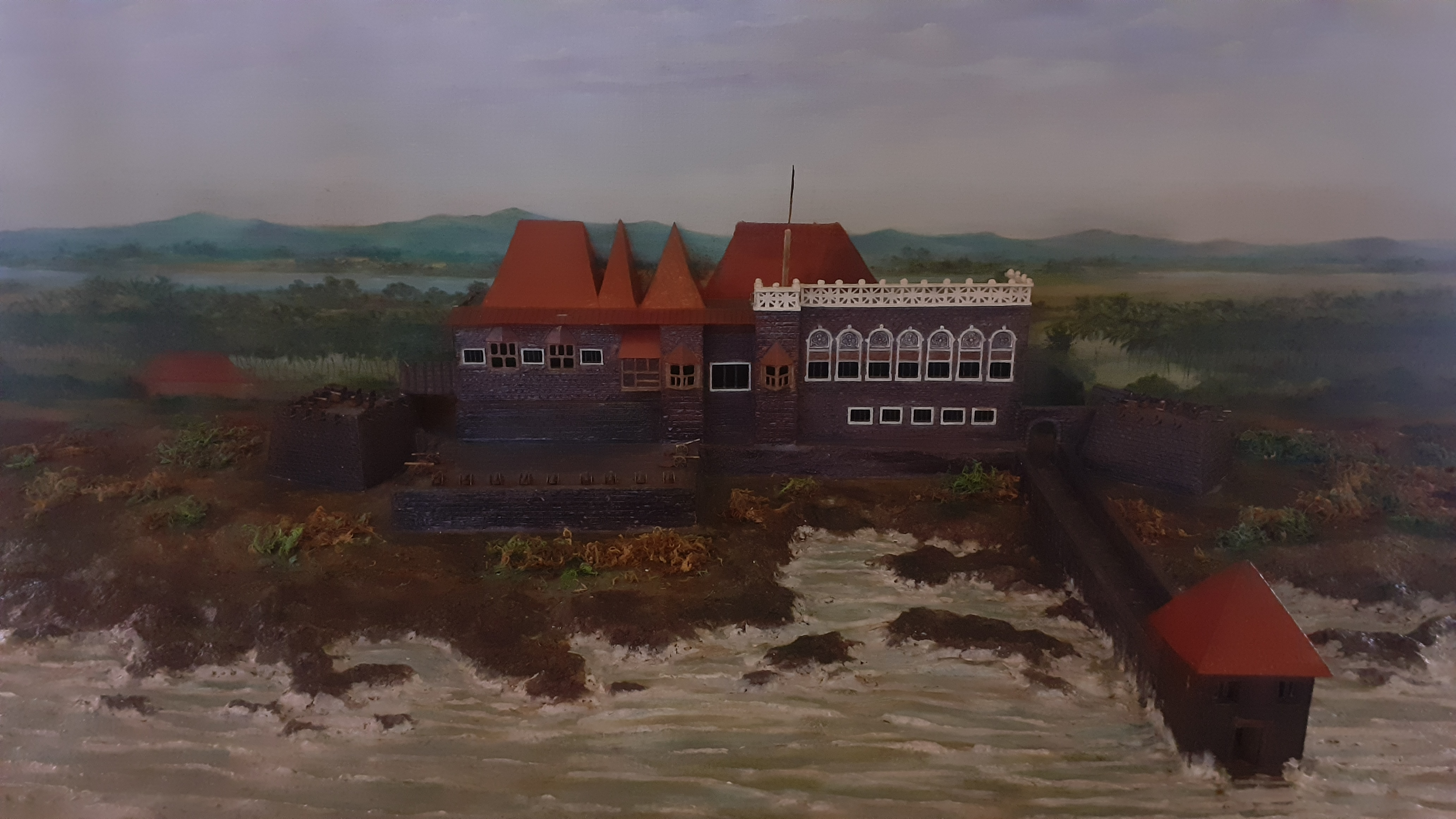
Model of the Bombay Castle

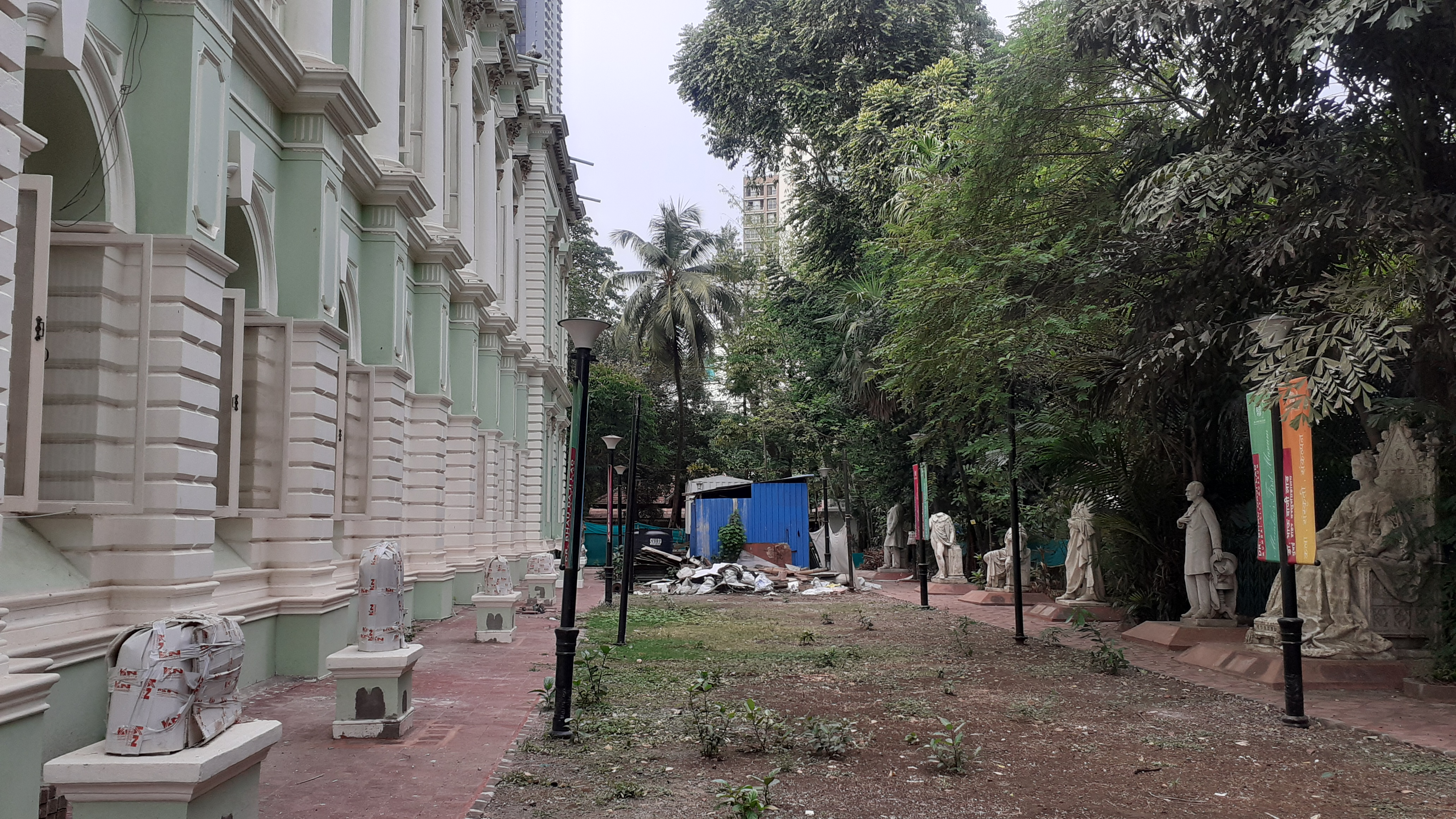
Statues at the west of the building
