= Harold Littledale =

Harold Littledale may refer to:

- Harold A. Littledale (1885–1957), Welsh-born American journalist
- Harold Littledale (professor) (1853–1930), professor of English
