= Capital Times (New Zealand) =

- Type: alternative weekly
- Founded: 1974
- Ceased publication: 2013
- Language: English
- Headquarters: Wellington, New Zealand
- Website: capitaltimes.co.nz

The Capital Times was a free alternative weekly newspaper published in Wellington, New Zealand, from 1974 to 2013. It focused primarily on local events, the arts scene, and broader issues concerning the Wellington City region. It included long-running cartoon Jitterati by Grant Buist.

The Capital Times closed in April 2013.
