= Govind Narayan Madgaonkar =

Indian writer (c. 1815–1865)

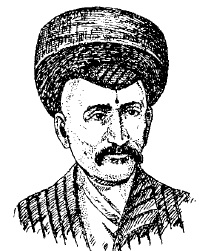
- Born: c. 1815
- Died: 15 March 1865
- Education: Free General Assembly School, Mumbai
- Occupations: Writer; Essayist; Teacher
- Notable work: Mumbaiche Varnan (1863)

Govind Narayan Madgaonkar (c. 1815 – 15 March 1865) was a Goan essayist and educationist. He is noted for writing Mumbaiche Varnan, considered the first book in any Indian language to provide a descriptive account of a specific place.

== Early life ==
Madgaonkar was born around 1815. During the 19th century, when he was nine years old, his father moved the family to Mumbai. There, his father engaged in the trade of selling Portuguese powder and other small medicinal items. The family moved to the city in 1824, six years after the East India Company had secured victory against the Marathas.

Madgaonkar received his education in Marathi and English at the Free General Assembly School in Mumbai. In 1833, his father died, placing the responsibility of the entire family on him. Consequently, he had to abandon his education halfway and accept a job as a teacher at the same school.

== Career ==
=== Teaching and education ===
Madgaonkar worked continuously as a teacher at the Free General Assembly School for thirty years, gaining a reputation as a skilled teacher and educationist. He retired from the institution in 1863.

In 1857, a committee was established under the inspiration of Mr. Howard, the then head of the government education department, to create Marathi textbooks. Madgaonkar was included in this committee. He worked alongside Dadoba Pandurang Tarkhadkar to review books and write new lessons.

=== Literary work ===
Madgaonkar was a prose writer who wrote extensively on practical, ethical, and scientific subjects. He gained significant fame as an essayist and contributed numerous articles and essays to the monthly magazine Marathi Dnyanprasarak. Over his 50-year lifespan, he wrote approximately 18 books.

His notable works include:

- Shuchirbhutpana (1849)
- Runanishedhak Bodh (1850)
- Hindu Lokanchya Riti Sudharnyavishayibodh (1851)
- Srishtintil Chamatkar (1853)
- Darupasun Anarth (1855)
- Udbhijjanya Padarth (1856)
- Lokhandi Sadkanche Chamatkar (1858)
- Vyavharopayogi Natak (1859) – Regarded as the first written drama in Marathi.

=== Mumbaiche Varnan ===
Published in 1863, Mumbaiche Varnan (Description of Mumbai) is his most acclaimed work. It is recognized as the first book describing a specific location not only in Marathi but in any Indian language. In recent times, it has been translated into English as Govind Narayan's Mumbai: An Urban Biography from 1863.

==== Content and themes ====
In this book, Madgaonkar provided an amusing and detailed description of Mumbai's geography, history, people, religion, customs, trade, and ethics. He specifically covered the "illusions" of the city and its world of rogues. He captured the city at a "crossroads," noting that while the Indian Rebellion of 1857 had left the city relatively untouched, the era was marked by rapid growth and an influx of people from around the world.

Madgaonkar expressed a "modern sensibility," welcoming rapid urbanization rather than looking back with nostalgia at village life. He described buzzing markets, international trade, factories, and the "melting pot" of people. He urged cultured citizens to visit docks and factories to increase their knowledge, rather than "wandering about during festival days". He also documented the lives of ordinary men and women in the streets and bazaars.

He was critical of the caste system, observing that caste pride generated "hatred, jealousy, ill-will and a perpetual state of strife". He noted that no single caste was dominant in the city and dismissed caste superiority as "idiocy" and "vain pride".

The book also commented on modern infrastructure. Madgaonkar viewed the train service between Bori Bunder and Thane as the "beginning of the new age in Bharat Khand". He welcomed the establishment of the University of Mumbai in 1857 and the rise of native journals.

==== Legacy and reception ====
To mark his death centenary in 1965, the Mumbai Marathi Granth Sangrahalaya published a second edition of this book. Scholars such as A. K. Priolkar, N. R. Phatak, and Gangadhar Gadgil were instrumental in bringing the book back to public notice during this time.

Modern critics have noted that while Madgaonkar offered a "delectable glimpse" into the economic and intellectual ferment of his time, his work had limitations. He lacked a sense of national identity, instead welcoming the stability of British rule. His writing glossed over issues such as child labour in textile mills, viewing machines optimistically as tools that allowed the illiterate to compete with trained artisans. He also did not foresee the eventual crash of the "bubble economy" driven by the cotton boom of the American Civil War era.
