= Jagannath Shankarshet =

Indian reformer, philanthropist during British Raj (1831–1865)

The Honourable Jagannath Shankarshet MLC
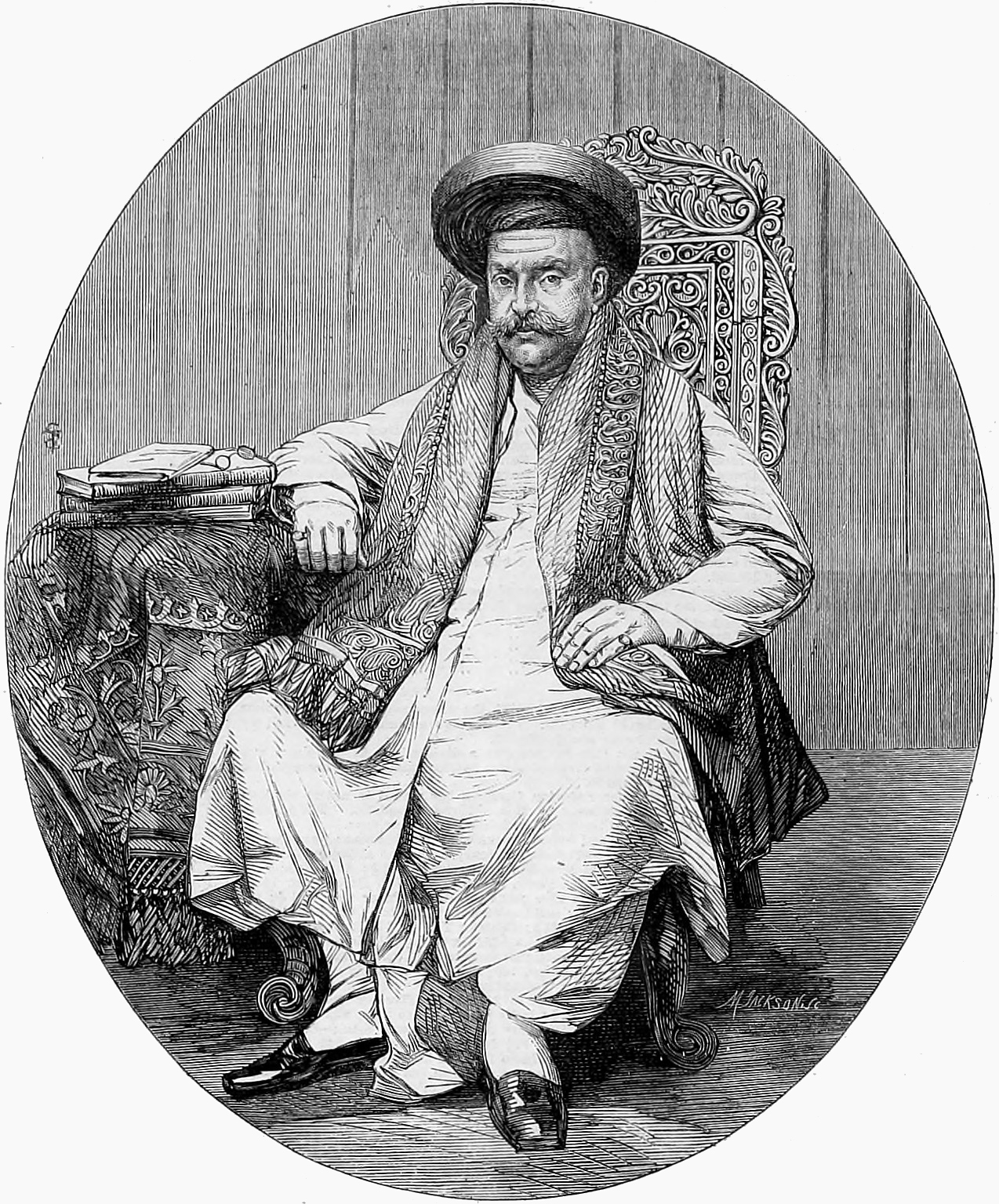
- Jagannath Shankarshet c. 1863

Advisor to the Governor of Bombay
- In office 1862 - 1865
- Governor: Henry Bartle Frere

Member of Bombay Legislative Council
- In office 1862 - 1865
- Governor: Henry Bartle Frere
- Constituency: Nominated

Personal details
- Born: Jagannath Shankarshet; 10 February 1803 Bombay, Maratha Confederacy
- Died: 31 July 1865 (aged 62) Bombay, British India
- Party: Bombay Association
- Occupation: Businessman, philanthropist, educationalist
- Known for: Founded first ever school for girls in Mumbai
- Nickname(s): Nana; Maker of Modern Bombay

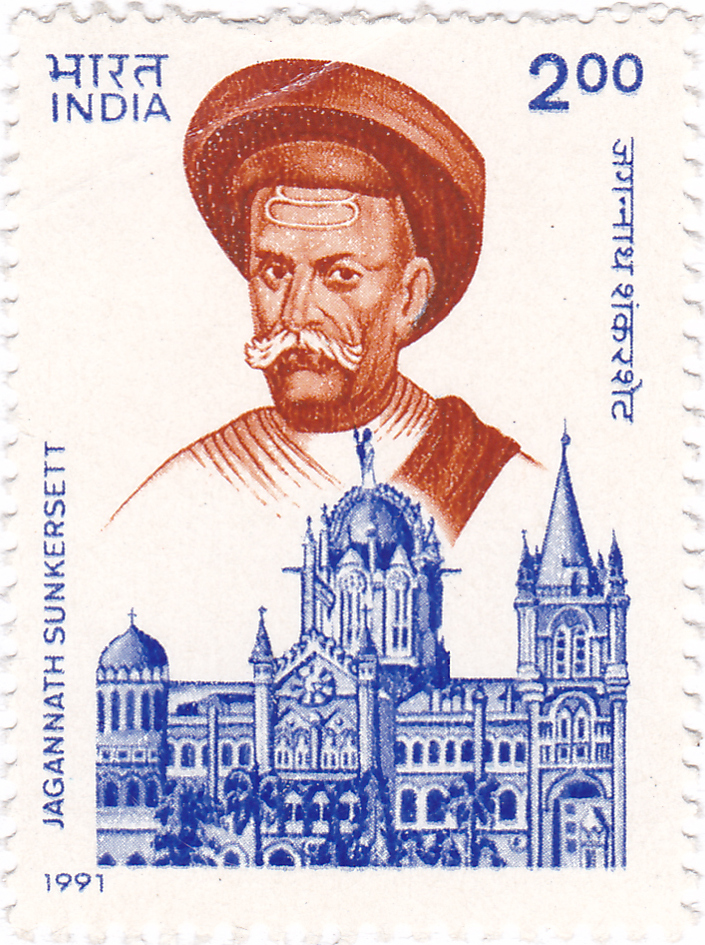
Sunkersett on a 1991 stamp of India

Jagannath Shankarshet (Sunkersett) MLC (10 February 1803 – 31 July 1865), better known as Nana Shankarshet (शंकरशेट), was an Indian philanthropist and educationalist. He was born in the wealthy Murkute family in Bombay. So high was his credit that Arabs, Afghans and other foreign merchants chose to place their treasures in his custody rather than with banks. He was one of two Indian members on the first board of management the Great Indian Peninsula Railway along with Jamsetjee Jejeebhoy.

== Personal life ==
Jagannath Shankarshet was born on 10 February 1803 at Bombay to a Marathi Daivadnya family, renowned for their expertise in goldsmithing and jewelry trade. His father ShankarShet was a dealer in jewellery and diamonds, and he became so wealthy and successful in this business, that he became known colloquially known as Shankar Sheth (a nickname/surname indicating wealth and status).

In 1861 he was a member of Bombay Presidency assembly. In 1862 he became the adviser of governor of Bombay Presidency. Nana Donated Huge Acres of land for Formation of Mumbai city and for development of Port areas in Mumbai.

== Social and educational work ==
Nana became an active leader in many arenas of life in Mumbai. Foreseeing the need for improvements in education. He opened the first ever school for girls in Mumbai in 1849. He became one of the founders of the School Society and the Native School of Bombay, the first of its kind in Western India. The school went through a series of name changes: in 1824, it became the Bombay Native Institution, in 1840, the Board of Education, and in 1856 the name which continues to this day, the Elphinstone Educational Institution. It is the same institution where, the well known, Balshashtri Jambhekar, Dadabhai Nauroji, Mahadev Govind Ranade, R. G. Bhandarkar were the students during Nana's period. Later, even Gopal Krishna Gokhale, Bal Gangadhar Tilak had attended the Elphinstone College for studies. When the Students' Literary and Scientific Society first opened their girls' schools, Jagannath Shankar Sheth contributed much of the necessary funds, despite strong opposition of some members of the Hindu community. Other educational projects he began include the English School, the Sanskrit Seminary, and the Sanskrit Library, all of which are located in Girgaon, South Mumbai.

He donated his hundreds of acres land for development of Mumbai. He established many educational institutions in it. He was one of the founders of Bombay Native Education Society, it was the first education institute in western India. By Shankarsheth's efforts the Haind Shala and School book society got founded in 1822. Later this institute got transformed into Bombay native education society. Due to his works he is known as sculpturer of Mumbai.

== Development works ==
Jagannath Shankar Sheth, George Birdwood and Bhau Daji were instrumental in some of the major reconstruction efforts of the city, beginning in 1857. The three gradually changed a town made up of a close network of streets into a spacious and airy city, adorned with fine avenues and splendid buildings. He became the first Indian to be nominated to the Bombay Legislative Council under the Indian Councils Act 1861, and became a member of the Bombay Board of Education. He also was the first Indian member of The Asiatic Society of Mumbai, and is known to have endowed a school and donated land in Grant Road for a theater. His influence was used by John Malcolm to induce the Hindus to acquiesce in the suppression of suttee or widow-burning, and his efforts also paid off after the Hindu community was granted a cremation ground at Sonapur. He is known to have donated generously to Hindu temples. During the First War of Independence of 1857, the British suspected his involvement, but acquitted him due to lack of evidence. He died in Mumbai on 31 July 1865. A year after his death a marble statue was erected at the Asiatic Society of Mumbai. Erstwhile Girgaon Road and chowk (Nana Chowk) at Grant Road are named after him in South Mumbai.

The Bombay Association was the first political organization in Mumbai founded by Jagannath Shankar Sheth on 26 August 1852. Various members were Sir Jamshedji Jejeebhoy, Jagannath Shankarsheth, Naoroji Furdunji, Dr. Bhau Daji Lad, Dadabhai Naoroji and Vinayak Shankar Sheth. Sir Jamshedji Jejeebhoy was the first president of the organization.

== Family History ==
Jagannath's ancestor Babulsheth Ganbasheth migrated to Mumbai in the mid-18th century from Konkan. Babulsheth's son Shankarsheth was a prominent businessman of South Mumbai in the late-18th century. Gunbow Street (now called Rustom Sidhwa Marg) in the Fort business district of Mumbai, is named after Ganba Sheth, and not, as many people assume, is of military origin.

Descendants of Nana still look after the family estate as well as the family temple at Nana Chowk.

== Philanthropy ==
The Dr. Bhau Daji Lad Museum, at Byculla in Mumbai which was designed by a famous London architect was built with the patronage of many wealthy Indian businessmen and philanthropists like Jagannath Shankar Sheth, David Sassoon and Jamsetjee Jejeebhoy.

The Bhavani-Shankar Mandir and The Ram Mandir near Nana Chowk were built by Shankar Sheth, Babulsheth in the early-19th century and are currently in the possession of the Sunkersett (शंकरशेट) family.

== Bibliography ==
- Bharatcha Pahila Rashtrapurush ( transl. India's first nationalist) Na. Jagannath Shankar Sheth by Dr. Madhav R. Potdar.
