= George Lamb Buist Rivers =

American lawyer, politician, and businessman (1896–1963)

- Born: May 26, 1896; Charleston, South Carolina, U.S.
- Died: September 12, 1963 (aged 67); Charleston, South Carolina, U.S.
- Resting place: Magnolia Cemetery, Charleston, South Carolina, U.S.
- Education: College of Charleston; Harvard Law School
- Occupations: lawyer, politician, businessman, civic leader
- Political party: Democratic Party
- Spouse: Ethel Pinckney Rutledge
- Children: 2 sons
- Parent(s): Moultrie Rutledge Rivers; Eliza Ingraham Buist
- Relatives: George Lamb Buist (grandfather); Martha Rivers Ingram (niece)

George Lamb Buist Rivers (May 26, 1896 - September 12, 1963) was an American lawyer, politician, businessman, and civic leader. He served as a member of the South Carolina House of Representatives and the South Carolina Senate, and as the president of the Central Railroad of South Carolina.

== Early life ==
Rivers was born on May 26, 1896, in Charleston, South Carolina. He had two brothers, John M. Rivers and Arthur L. Rivers, and a sister, who married Charles Webb.

Rivers graduated from the College of Charleston, where he earned a Bachelor of Arts degree in 1916. He attended the Harvard Law School in 1916–1917, served in World War I in 1918, and returned to the HLS in 1919. He was awarded a Distinguished Service Cross, and he passed the South Carolina Bar exam in 1919.

== Career ==
Rivers started his career by working for his father's law firm, Hagood, Rivers & Young, in 1919. He became the assistant U.S. attorney for Eastern South Carolina in 1922.

Rivers was a member of the Democratic Party. He served as a member of the South Carolina House of Representatives from 1924 to 1928, and the South Carolina Senate in 1930. In 1956, he believed South Carolina should be able to decide whether to integrate public schools independently of the federal government.

Rivers served on the board of directors of the Franklin Insurance Company in 1936. He became the president of the Central Railroad of South Carolina in 1947. He was an officer of the Standard Insurance Company of Charleston in 1960. In 1959, with Hans F. Paul, Rivers represented Theodore Reed, a driver who ran over three African Americans (Dorothy Matheny, Hurtel Cabell, and Frank Hodges).

Rivers served on the South Carolina Research, Planning and Development Board from 1951 to 1958. He was the president of the board of trustees of his alma mater, the College of Charleston, from 1961 to 1963.

== Personal life, death and legacy ==
Rivers married Ethel Pinckney Rutledge. They had two sons, George Lamb Buist Rivers Jr. and Thomas Pinckney Rutledge Rivers. Rivers died on September 12, 1963, in Charleston, South Carolina. He was buried in the Magnolia Cemetery. Rivers and his father are the namesakes of the Rivers Residence Hall at the College of Charleston.
