= Robert Knight (editor) =

Robert Knight (13 March 1825 – 27 January 1890) was an English editor, journalist and newspaper proprietor. He was an editor of Times of India and founder of The Statesman, two of the most prominent newspapers in India.

== Biography ==
Knight was born in Vauxhall Walk, Lambeth, London. He came to Bombay in British India in 1847 as a 22-year-old and later took up journalism and writing articles in newspapers. Robert Knight became the Editor of the Bombay Times in 1857 replacing George Buist. In December 1859 the Bombay Standard and Chronicle of Western India was absorbed into it and later in and in 1861 it absorbed its rivals Courier and Telegraph, both Bombay newspapers, and the name was changed to The Times of India. It grew into national prominence under him. He forged an arrangement with Reuters which made them the sole agent for India. Later he left The Times of India and started The Statesman in Calcutta in 1875.

In 1854, he married Catherine Hannah (1837–1918), with whom he had 12 children. He died in Calcutta in 1890, apparently of malaria. His sons Paul and Robert were also journalists and newspapers proprietors.

Samanth Subramanian, in The Caravan magazine, considered Knight an "acid critic of British imperialism".
