= Jijamata Udyaan =

Gardens and zoo in Mumbai, India

Jijabai Udyan and Zoo
- Victoria Gardens; Byculla Zoo
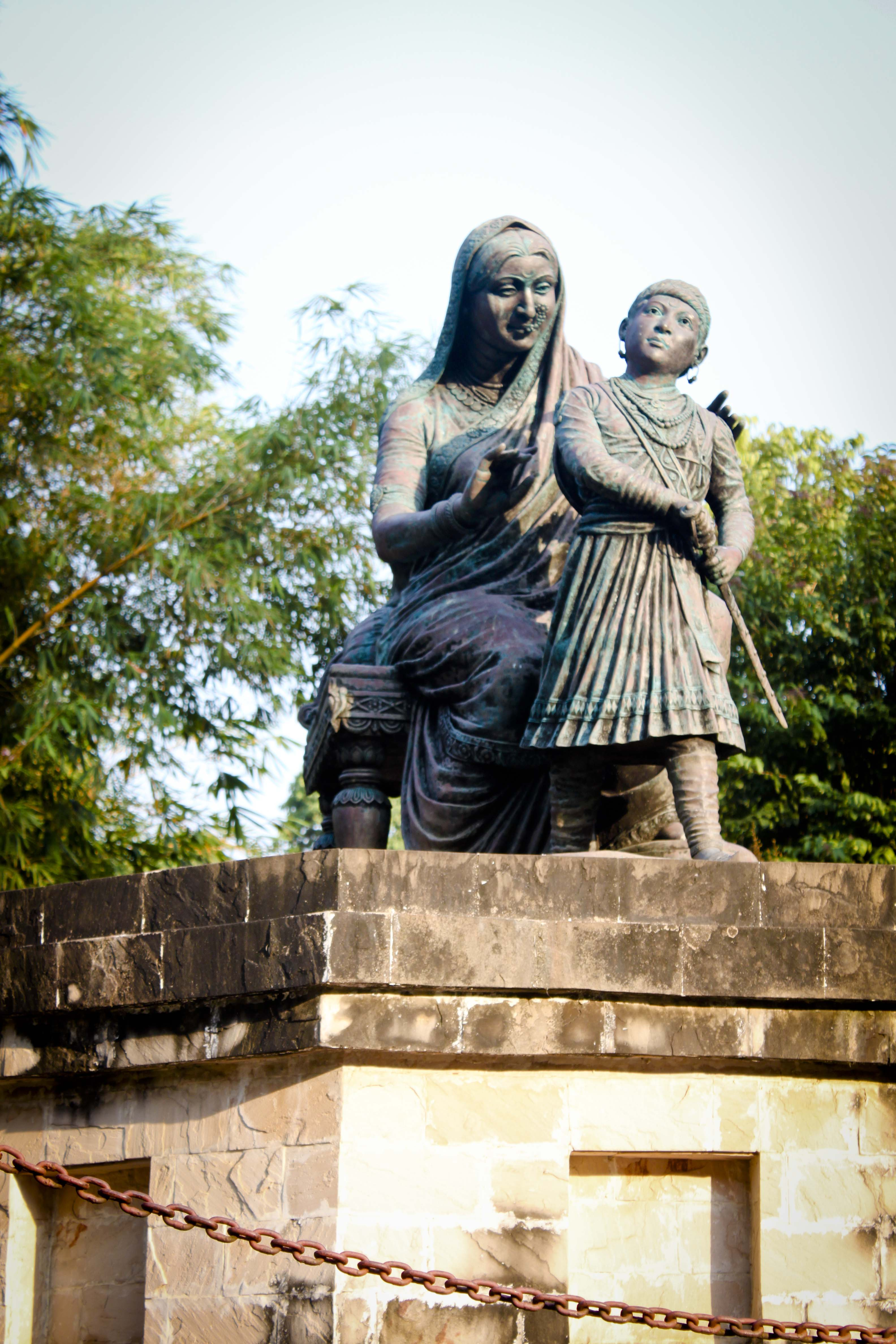
- Statue of Jijamata and Shivaji
- Interactive map of Jijabai Udyan and Zoo
- Type: Botanical Garden & Zoo
- Location: Mumbai (Maharashtra)
- Coordinates: 18.9781154°N 72.8367457°E
- Area: 50 acres (20 ha)
- Owner: Municipal Corporation of Greater Mumbai
- Status: Open
- Public transit: Byculla

Jijamata Udyaan, also known as Victoria Gardens and the Byculla Zoo, is a zoo and garden covering 50 acres located at Byculla, in the heart of Mumbai, India. It is the oldest public garden in Mumbai. After Indian independence, it was officially renamed after Jijamata, the mother of Shivaji, the first Maratha emperor; the original name remains popular.

In 1835, the British administration granted a large plot of land in Sewri to the Agro Horticultural Society of Western India for a botanical garden known as Victoria Gardens, after Queen-Empress Victoria. That land was later acquired for a European burial ground. In 1861, construction of a new garden was commenced on 33 acres in the Mount Estate, Mazgaon (now included in Byculla). The flora from Sewri garden was transferred to this new garden named Jijamata Udyaan, which was formally opened to the public by Lady Frere on 19 November 1862. Agro Horticultural Society of Western India continued to maintain Victoria Gardens until 1873 when the society's end led to the municipal corporation taking over the garden's upkeep. In 1890 the garden was extended by 15 acres especially for the zoo.

The garden is the only green space in Mumbai that features Palladian style architecture. It houses the Dr. Bhau Daji Lad Museum, a staff building in Greco-Roman style erected in the memory of Lady Frere, an equestrian statue of King Edward VII made of black marble (originally installed near the University of Mumbai) and the David Sassoon clock tower.

== Gallery ==
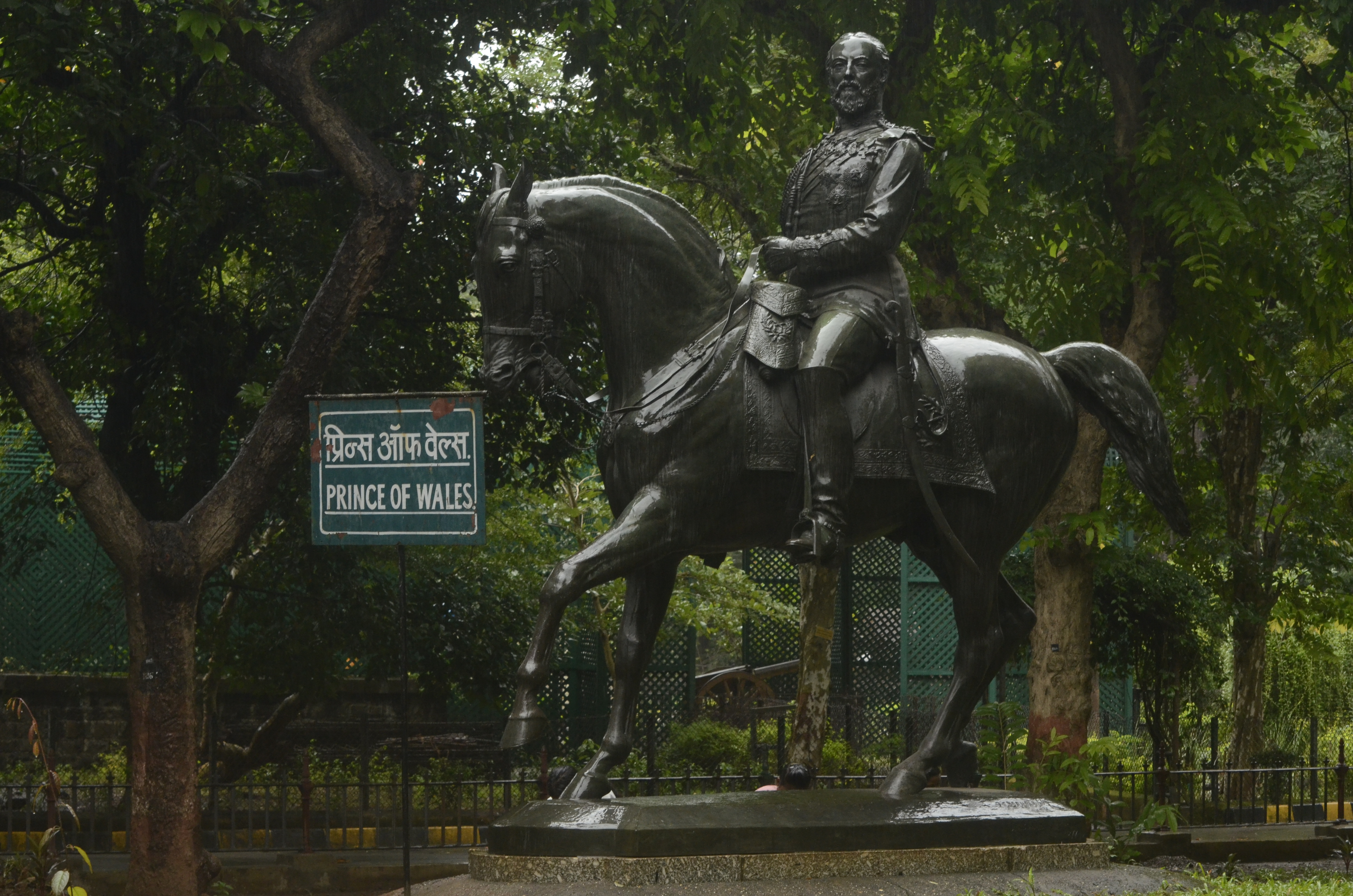
The statue of King Edward VII of England, originally installed at Kala Ghoda

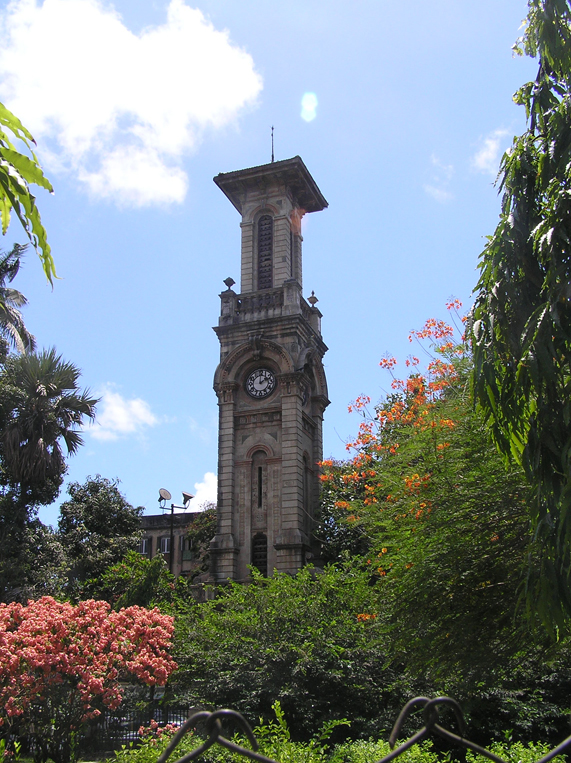
David Sassoon clock tower, situated at the entrance of the gardens

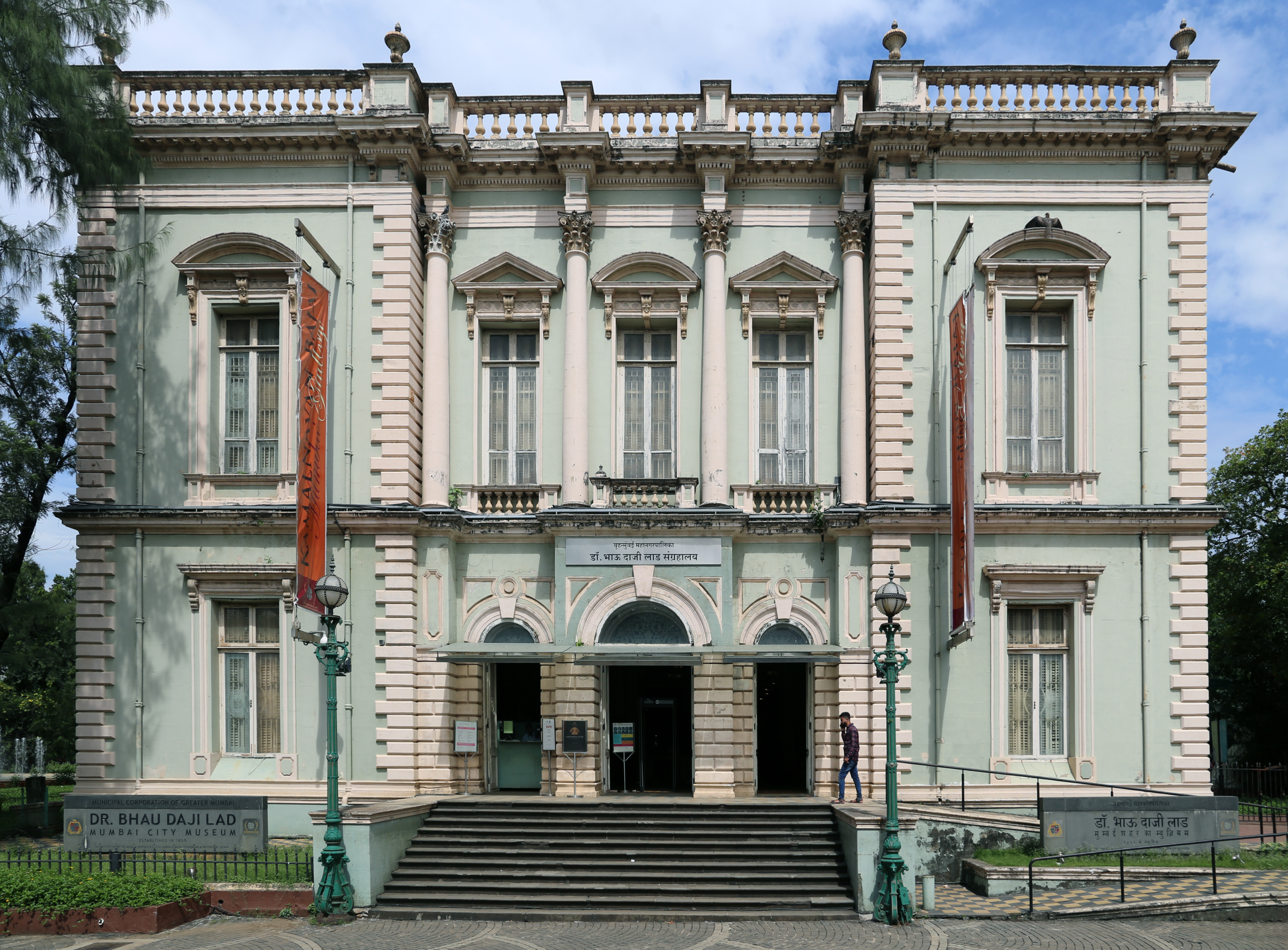
Dr. Bhau Daji Lad Museum, the oldest museum in Mumbai, situated in the garden premises
