= George Lamb Buist =

American lawyer and politician

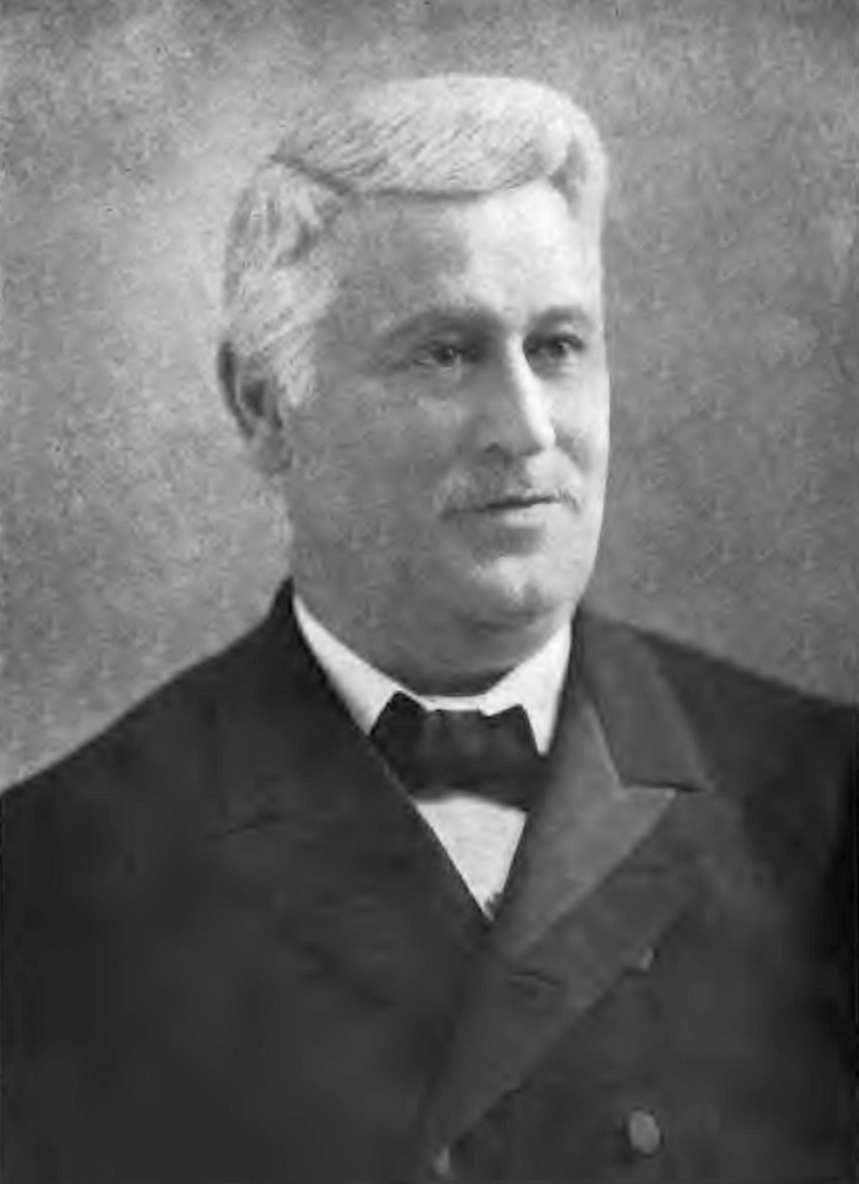

Member of the South Carolina House of Representatives from Charleston County
- In office 1876–1880

Member of the South Carolina Senate from Charleston County
- In office 1882–1898

Personal details
- Born: September 4, 1838 Charleston, South Carolina
- Died: May 31, 1907 (aged 68) Charleston, South Carolina
- Party: Democratic
- Relatives: George Lamb Buist Rivers (grandson); John M. Rivers (great-grandson); Martha Rivers Ingram (great-great-granddaughter)
- Education: College of Charleston

George Lamb Buist (September 4, 1838 – May 31, 1907) was an American lawyer and politician who lived in Charleston, South Carolina.

== Biography ==
George Lamb Buist was born in Charleston. He graduated from the New Jersey Academy in Burlington, New Jersey and the College of Charleston, and he passed the South Carolina Bar in 1860.

During the American Civil War, he joined the Confederate Army, serving with the Palmetto Guards. In the postbellum era, he served in the South Carolina House of Representatives and South Carolina Senate. He represented Charleston County and served in the state senate from 1882 to 1898. He was a Democrat. He served on the board of trustees of his alma mater, the College of Charleston.

Buist married Martha Allston White,, the daughter of notorious slave trader Alonzo J. White (slave trader), and they had 10 children. He died in Charleston on May 31, 1907.
