= Grant Buist =

New Zealand cartoonist

- Born: 1973 (age 52–53) Wellington, New Zealand
- Areas: cartoonist, animator, playwright
- Notable works: Brunswick, Jitterati

Grant Buist (born 1973) is a cartoonist, animator, and playwright from Wellington, New Zealand. He is notable for his comic strips Jitterati and Brunswick, whose characters have been reproduced in many forms of cultural activities including newspapers, murals, short films, and theatre productions.

== Biography ==
Grant Buist was born in Wellington, New Zealand in 1973. He is a graduate of Victoria University of Wellington's Theatre and Film Department; he also studied graphic design at Massey University. He is currently living on the Kāpiti Coast.

== Jitterati ==
Buist writes the comic strip Jitterati (a satire on latte-sipping cafe values along with contemporary political and social developments in Wellington and beyond) which was published in the weekly Wellington City newspaper The Capital Times until it closed in April 2013. Jitterati hit the 500th episode in May 2012. A compilation book of Jitterati strips was published in 2009. From July 2013 the cartoon series began appearing in the monthly Wellington magazine FishHead, which closed in 2016. Jitterati was then published online, by Scoop until April 2017, and subsequently on Buist's Twitter account.

== Brunswick ==
Buist also produced the cult New Zealand alt-comic strip Brunswick from 1993 to 2003. By the time that it ended, Brunswick was appearing in almost all New Zealand student newspapers, including Salient and Craccum, giving the strip the widest national distribution that a New Zealand underground comix had ever received. In celebration of Brunswick, Victoria University of Wellington erected a Brunswick Mural, and the walls of one of the library lifts was covered in a Brunswick collage. In 2006, Brunswick was turned into a series of short films for the Wellington information kiosks. In 2007 BATS Theatre staged Brunswick-based musical Fitz Bunny: Lust for Glory (FB:L4G), which set a box office record for the 2007 Young & Hungry festival, BATS Theatre's celebration of young talent. An updated and refocused version of the satirical play was produced in Auckland in 2010, which was considered one of the top five plays of the year by national newspaper The New Zealand Herald. Herald critic Paul Simei-Barton said about the 2010 production "Fitz Bunny: Lust for Glory is in a league of its own and invents a new genre that might be called camp cartoon cabaret. Playwright and cartoonist Grant Buist presents a fully fledged musical complete with live band, great songs and wild dance routines." Buist has written a version of the show for schools, which was performed at Tokomairiro High School in July 2018.

== Other activities ==
In 2007 he was the graphic designer for Salient. He has also animated music videos for cult New Zealand bands The Shirleys and OdESSA. In the short time, between 2008 and 2010, Grant established an account on Pixton where he created a three-panel comic entitled Desert Funnies. The comic series, about two friendly cacti in the desert, relied on visual gags and humor that ranged from light to almost metaphorical and poetic standards. The series reached 211 issues.

Buist has also participated in several art exhibitions.

== Awards ==
- MUVIMAC Awards 2001 - Best Actor, Best Soundtrack, Best Film for Get Brunswick
- DIVA Awards 2001 -Best Kiss & Best Animation for Get Brunswick
- MUVIMAC Awards 2002 - Best Actor, Best Animation & Best Soundtrack for The Brunswick Soundtrack
- MUVIMAC Awards 2003 - Best Credits for 'Palmerston North Vampire'
- Wellington Fringe Festival Special Competition 2004 - 2nd place for Oranges Will Bring Us Together
- Eric Awards 2006 - Best Webcomic in NZ Comics for Jitterati
