= Dadoba Pandurang =

Indian social reformer and linguist

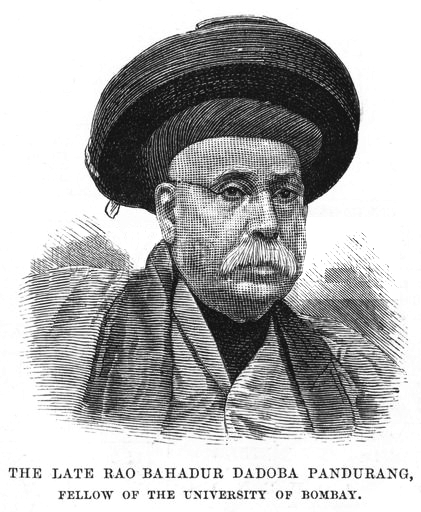
Engraving from the Illustrated London News, 2 December 1882

Dadoba Pandurang (Tarkhadkar) (9 May 1814– 17 October 1882) (Pune, Maharashtra, British India) was a social reformer and linguist from Bombay. He was born with the surname Tarkhadkar in a Maharashtrian Vaishya family, but he never used it in later life. He wrote extensively on religion and social reform as an opponent of rituals and caste, while supporting widow-remarriage and education for women. He was brothers with Atmaram Pandurang and Bhaskarrao Pandurang Tarkhadkar. His brother Atmaram Pandurang had three daughters named Durga, Manik and Annapurna. Annapurna was known as Anna, she was one of the first girl in Maharashtra who went abroad for higher education along with her sisters Anna and young Rabindranath Tagore were very close, and the latter is supposed to have penned poems for her.

Pandurang studied at a local school for four years before going to private high school followed by studies at the Bombay Native School and Book Society. He was a recipient of a West Scholarship and studied at what became the Elphinstone and he learned several languages including Portuguese, Persian and Sanskrit.

In 1830 he became a school teacher and in 1840 he moved to Surat. The headmaster at this school in Surat was Henry Green, a noted agnostic and free thinker who influenced Pandurang. From 1846 he served as acting superintendent of vernacular schools and in 1852 he was selected for the post of Deputy Collector and Magistrate at Ahmednagar. He moved to Thana in 1858 and retired in 1861 due to troubles with superiors. Pandurang's major contribution was the grammar of Marathi. Maharastra Bhasheche Vyakaran published in 1836 that went into seven editions during his lifetime. He also published a supplement in 1881. Other publications included Yashoda Pandurangi (1865), Dharam Vivechan (1868), Paramhamsik Bramhadharma (1880), A Hindu Gentleman's Reflections respecting the works of Swedenborg (1878), The absurdity of the Holi Festival as it is now practised by the Hindus (1829), Shishubodh (posthumously published in 1884) and Vidhavasrumarjan (1857). He wrote Dharam Vivechan under the pen-name of Ek Jagadwasi Arya.

Pandurang taught Sanskrit briefly at the Sir Jamshedjee Jeejeebhoy Zarthosti Madresa in 1871. In 1848, he founded and presided over the Upayukta Jnanprasarak Sabha, a students' literary and scientific society which met to discuss various topics every alternate Thursday.
