= Atmaram Pandurang =

Indian physician and social reformer

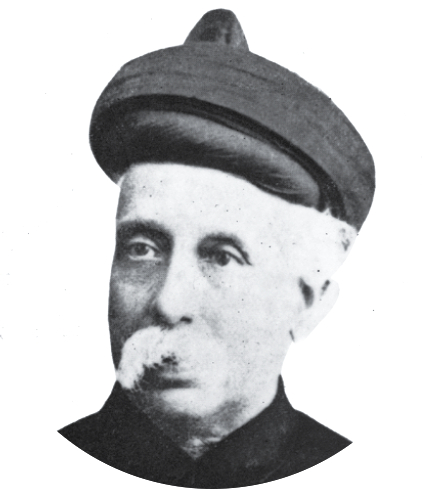
Atmaram Pandurang

Atmaram Pandurang or Atmaram Pandurang Turkhudkar (or just Turkhud in English publications) (1823 – 26 April 1898) was an Indian physician and social reformer who founded the Prarthana Samaj and was one of the two Indian co-founders (the other being Sakharam Arjun) of the Bombay Natural History Society. A graduate of Grant Medical College, he was a brother of Dadoba Pandurang (9 May 1814 – 17 October 1882), a scholar of Sanskrit and Marathi. Atmaram Pandurang served briefly as Sheriff of Bombay in 1879.

== Life and work ==
Atmaram was born to Pandurang Yeshwant and Yashodabai. He went to the Elphinstone Institution (along with fellow student Dadabhai Naoroji) where he studied mathematics under Bal Gangadhar Shastri Jambhekar (1812-1846). He then joined the newly opened Grant Medical College and was in the first batch of students that included Dr Bhau Daji Lad and joined on 1 November 1845. With a diploma, he worked in Bhiwandi, running a smallpox vaccination campaign. He later helped frame Article 14 of the Contagious Diseases Act (1868). He was present in the famous Maharaj Libel Case where he deposed as a witness to present evidence that the plaintiff suffered from venereal disease. Atmaram Pandurang was a theistic reformer who opposed many Hindu traditions including child marriage. He believed and openly supported the idea that the minimum age for marriage of girls should be twenty, to the disapproval of contemporary conservative Hindu society.

The Prarthana Samaj was founded at his home on 31 March 1867 and was influenced by Keshab Chunder Sen. Among the objects of the society at the time of its founding were to openly denounce the caste system, introduce widow-remarriage, encourage female education and abolish child-marriage. He was a Fellow of Bombay University and helped found the Bhandarkar free library. He was selected Sheriff of Bombay in 1879.

== Personal life ==
Pandurang belonged to a highly educated and influential family and his circle of acquaintances included reformists from across the country. When Rabindranath Tagore intended to visit England in 1878, he stayed for a time in their Bombay home and sought to improve his English with the assistance of Pandurang's second daughter Annapurna or Ana. Annapurna worked briefly as a headmistress at a zenana school in Hyderabad.

It is believed that the two were attracted to each other and Tagore wrote several poems in her memory (he referred to her as "Nalini"). Ana Turkhud, however, married Harold Littledale, professor of history and English literature at Baroda on 11 November 1880 and died in Edinburgh on 5 July 1891.

Pandurang's another daughter, Nalini Tarkhad (1911–1954), entered the Indian film industry in the 1930s, at a time when it was considered a taboo for upper-class background women. She retired after acting in a five films and married filmmaker Keshavrao Dhaibar.

Ana's older brother Moreshwar Atmaram obtained a gold medal in Practical Chemistry and obtained honours in mathematics and geology at University College London in 1867 and was a vice-principal at Rajkumar College in Baroda. Another daughter Manek Turkhud passed the Licensiate of Medicine and Surgery from Bombay in 1892. In the same year, the daughter of Dadabhai Naoroji, Maneckbai also passed the same examination. Another son Dnyaneshwar Atmaram Turkhud (1862-1943) studied at the Grant Medical College and at the University of Edinburgh from 1890 to 1891. He worked at the Haffkine Institute and served as a director of the King Institute of Preventive Medicine and Research at Guindy and worked in Kodaikanal on Anopheles mosquitoes until his death.

He died from a lung infection after visiting Lonavala. He was described in obituaries as a "mild Hindu" who held "very advanced views, too much so for the peace of mind of some of his colleagues". His wife Radhabai survived him.

== See also ==
- Raja Ram Mohan Roy
- M. G. Ranade
- Ramkrishna Gopal Bhandarkar
