= Harold Littledale (professor) =

Irish-born English professor in India

- Born: 3 October 1853
- Died: 11 May 1930 (aged 76)

Signature
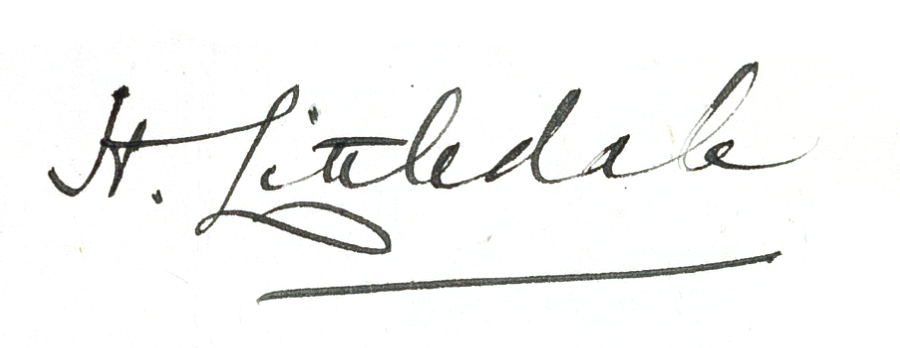

Harold Littledale (3 October 1853 – 11 May 1930) was a professor of English who worked in India. He published commentaries on the works of Tennyson, Wordsworth and Coleridge. He was also a naturalist who documented bird life mainly in western India.

== Life and work ==
Littledale was born in Rathgar to Dublin solicitor William Francis Littledale and Jane Cross. Educated at the Royal School, Armagh and Trinity College, Dublin with a BA (1876) he went to India in 1879 where he served as a vice principal at Baroda College. He became a director of vernacular instruction in Baroda State (1879–99). He was also a Fellow of Bombay University. Littledale travelled across the Himalayas, camping and shooting. He published a pamphlet Rough Notes of Travel and Sport in Kashmir and Little Thibet (1888) which was considered an amusing account. He travelled with the geologist Robert Bruce Foote who was surveying the Baroda State. A keen naturalist, sportsman, and collector of bird eggs, he wrote extensively on his observations from around India and contributed notes to various journals including Stray Feathers edited by A.O. Hume and later the journal of the Bombay Natural History Society of which he was an early member. While being a sport hunter himself, he saw native snaring of birds as a cause of decline in the numbers of the lesser florican. He was a proponent of introducing game species for the purpose of hunting and suggested the introduction of chukar into western India. In 1897 he suggested that notes be collated from observers to augment the earlier works on birds. He shot tigers around Baroda, and also documented folklore such as the use of tigress' milk as medicine. A collection of birds eggs that he made was purchased by the Baroda Museum. Littledale married Ana (Annapurna Turkhud) the daughter of Atmaram Pandurang on November 11, 1880, and they had a daughter Ana Nelline (Note: Nelline is from Nalini, a pseudonym used by Annapurna, a nickname given by her admirer Rabindranath Tagore who wrote several poems on her.) and a son Harold Aylmer. After the death of his wife in Edinburgh in 1891, Littledale married Sybil Frances Hanbury and they had five children, of whom daughter Maud Caroline married the cricketer Clarence Vivian Paull. Littledale left Baroda in 1898 and his position as professor of English was taken by Sri Aurobindo. He was professor of English at Cardiff University from 1899 until his retirement in 1921. At Grangetown, he founded a Shakespeare reading circle in 1910.

A collection made by Littledale of photographs from India, including pictures from Nainital before the 1880 landslide are held in the Cambridge University Library. He died at Southbourne, Bournemouth.
