= George Buist (minister) =

Church of Scotland minister (1779–1860)

George Buist (20 March 1779 – 1860) was a Scottish minister of the Church of Scotland who served as Moderator of the General Assembly of the Church of Scotland in 1848. He was Professor of Church History at the University of St Andrews.

== Life ==
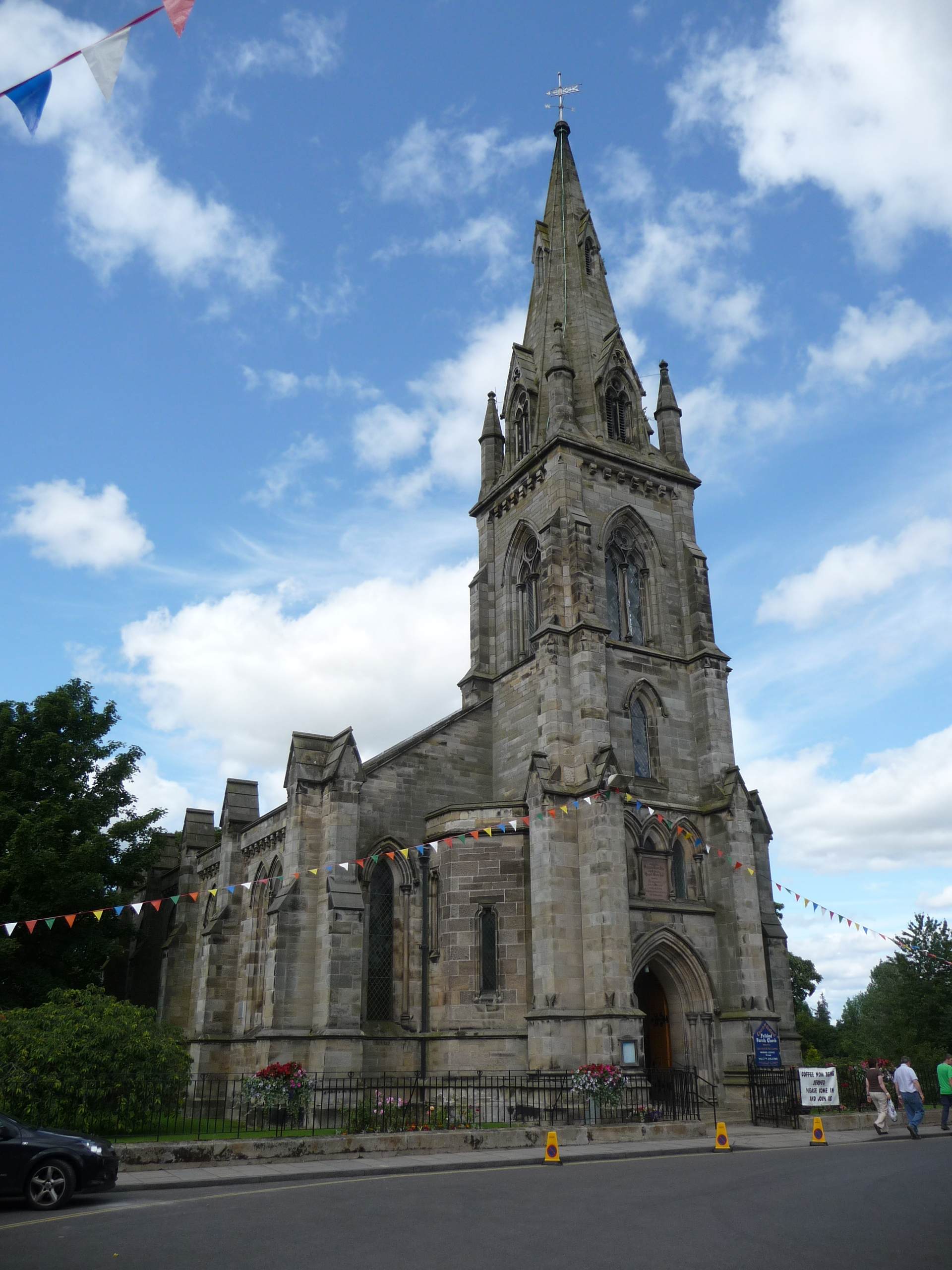
Falkland Church

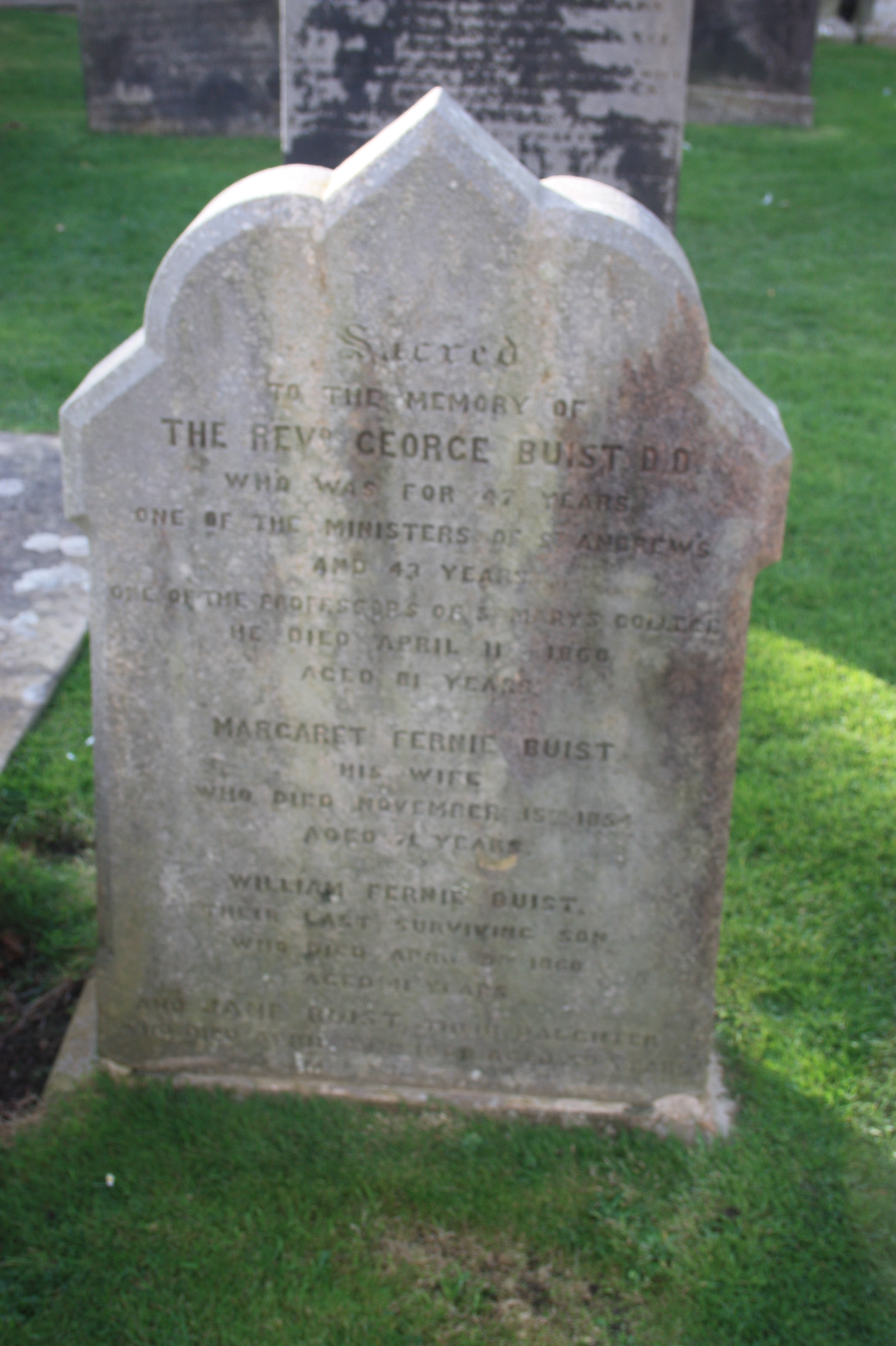
The grave of Very Rev George Buist, St Andrews Cathedral graveyard

He was born on 20 March 1779 near Kettle in Fife, the son of Margaret Low and her husband, George Buist, a farmer.

He studied Divinity at the University of St Andrews and the University of Edinburgh.

He was licensed to preach by the Presbytery of the Church of Scotland of Cupar in 1801 and began his ministry at Falkland in central Fife. He was translated to St Andrews in 1813, as second charge under Rev Robert Haldane. He was given a chair in Church History at St Andrews University the following year. Still acting as professor he was given the principal charge of the cathedral church in 1823. He served as Moderator of the General Assembly in 1848.

In 1841 he was living at Lawpark: a villa in St Andrews.

He died in St Andrews on 11 April 1860. He is buried in the churchyard of St Andrews Cathedral. The grave lies to the south-west of the central tower.

== Family ==
His uncle was Rev John Buist of Tannadice (1754-1845). John's son (George's cousin) was the journalist George Buist.

In 1805 George married Margaret Fernie (1783-1854), daughter of William Fernie of Tillywhanland. They had seven children the eldest being Lt George Buist of the Bengal Cavalry (1807-1842) killed in Afghanistan.

== Publications ==
- Accounts of St Andrews and St Leonards
