= George Buist (footballer) =

English footballer

Personal information
- Full name: Alfred George Buist
- Date of birth: q4 1883
- Place of birth: London, England
- Position: Goalkeeper

Senior career*
| Years | Team | Apps | (Gls) |
| – | Willington Athletic | | |
| 1904–1907 | Lincoln City | 83 | (0) |
| – | North Shields Athletic | | |
- * Club domestic league appearances and goals

Alfred George Buist (1883 – after 1907), known as George Buist, was an English footballer who made 83 appearances in the Football League for Lincoln City playing as a goalkeeper.
