= George Buist (journalist) =

Scottish journalist and scientist

George Buist FRSE FRS FRSSA FGS LL.D. (1805–1860) was a Scottish journalist and scientist. He was the editor of The Bombay Times and Journal of Commerce which his successor Robert Knight renamed The Times of India. He is described "as India's foremost man of letters".

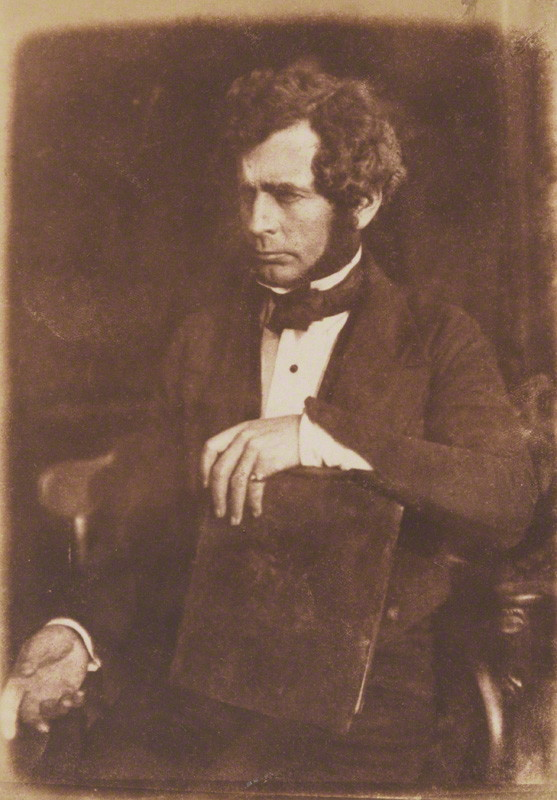
George Buist, 1845 calotype

== Early life ==
He was the son of the Rev. John Buist, born at Tannadice, Forfarshire, on 22 November 1805. His paternal uncle was Rev George Buist, Moderator of the General Assembly of the Church of Scotland in 1848.

After studying at St. Salvator's College, St. Andrews, at St. Mary's College, and Edinburgh University, he was licensed in 1826 as a preacher. He preached irregularly for six years, delivered a course of lectures on natural philosophy at St. Andrews town hall in 1832.

== Journalist ==
In 1832, also, Buist became editor of the Dundee Courier (later the Constitutional). He left it in 1834, and set up the Dundee Guardian on his own account, and also the Scottish Agricultural Magazine. He was invited to edit the Perth Constitutional in 1835. After a visit to London in 1837, and two years' management of the Fifeshire Journal, he accepted in 1839 the post of editor of the Bombay Times. He took over after the J.E. Brennan died just a year after it was started in 1838 and then Bombay Times was a biweekly. It became a daily in 1850 under him.

Buist was at the Bombay Times for 20 years. He used its columns to argue against retaliation after the Afghan uprising of 1842. After the loss of his first wife in 1845, he went back to the United Kingdom for a few months, and over the period 1845–6 became a Fellow of the Royal Society, and was admitted to six other learned societies.

In January 1846 Buist was back again at the Bombay Times, where he continued as editor. He went on leave to the United Kingdom again in 1856, leaving Robert Knight in charge as acting editor. He returned took charge of the Bombay Times, but a Parsi shareholder Fardoonji Naoroji wanted him to change his pro establishment editorial policy particularly in background of the Indian Rebellion of 1857. However, Buist refused to change his editorial policy or give up his editorial independence. After a shareholder's meeting he was replaced by Robert Knight.

== Last years ==
From January 1858 Buist ran the Bombay Standard which was merged into The Bombay Times

In 1859 Buist retired from journalism to take up a government appointment at Allahabad. He died at sea, en route to Calcutta on 1 October 1860.

== Interests ==
Buist became unpaid inspector of the observatories of Bombay. During his time in England in 1845 he obtained special grants from the government for improving agricultural machines and rural economy in India, and for establishing 12 observatories, from Cape Comorin to the Red Sea, for meteorological and tidal research. He also formed the geological collection for the museum of Elphinstone College, Bombay.

In 1846 Buist was appointed to the honorary position of sheriff of Bombay. In 1847 he planned, and in 1850 founded, the Bombay Reformatory School of Industry for the reformation and education of Indian children, of which he was superintendent, under the patronage of the governor, Lord Elphinstone.

== Works ==
In 1837 Buist was awarded a prize by the Highland Society of Scotland for a paper Geology of the South-eastern portion of Perthshire. He contributed scientific papers to the Journal of the Bombay branch of the Asiatic Society, and before leaving Scotland had written, for the Highland Society, some further topographical and geological articles on Perthshire and Fife.

Buist drew up the Bombay Observatory Report for 1844, which contained records of 170,000 observations. He also compiled an Index to Books and Papers on the Physical Geography, Antiquities, and Statistics of India (Bombay, 1852). Other works include:-

- Geology of Bombay (1863)
- Annals of India for the Year 1848 (1849)
- Manual of Physical Research Adapted for India (1852)
- Floods in India of 1849 (1850)

== Notes ==
Attribution

This article incorporates text from a publication now in the public domain: Stephen, Leslie, ed. (1886). "Buist, George". Dictionary of National Biography. Vol. 7. London: Smith, Elder & Co.
