= Morehead (surname) =

Morehead is a surname. Notable people with the surname include:

- Albert Hodges Morehead (1909–1966), American writer on the game of bridge for The New York Times
  - Albert Hodges Morehead's son Philip Morehead (born 1942), American musician formerly of Chicago, now residing in Canada.
- Boyd Dunlop Morehead (1843–1905), Premier of Queensland, Australia, 1888–1890
- Dave Morehead (1943–2025), American Major League Baseball pitcher
- John Motley Morehead (1796–1866), Governor of North Carolina, 1841–1845
  - John's brother James Turner Morehead (1799–1875), American politician
  - John's wife Ann Eliza Lindsay Morehead (1804–1868), First Lay of North Carolina
  - John's son James Turner Morehead (1840–1908), American chemist
    - James' daughter Lily Morehead (1869–1943), American politician
    - James' son John Motley Morehead III (1870–1965), American chemist and diplomat
- Patricia S. Morehead (born 1938), American educator and politician
- William Morehead (1737–1793), Scottish landowner
  - William Morehead's son Robert Morehead (1777–1842), Scottish clergyman and poet
  - Robert Morehead's son William Ambrose Morehead (1805–1863), Scottish member of the Indian Civil Service who acted as the Governor of Madras
  - Robert Morehead's son Charles Morehead (1807–1882), Scottish physician who served in the Indian Medical Service

== See also ==
- Moorehead
- Muirhead
