= Muirhead (surname) =

Muirhead is a surname of Scottish origin, and may refer to:

- Aaron Muirhead (born 1990), Scottish footballer
- Alexander Muirhead (1848–1920), Scottish scientist
- Andy Muirhead (born 1975), Australian radio and television presenter
- Anthony Muirhead (1890–1939), British politician and soldier
- Arch Muirhead (1876–19??), Australian rules footballer
- Ben Muirhead (born 1983), English footballer
- Bill Muirhead (curler), Scottish curler
- Billie-May Muirhead, Scottish curler
- Bruce Muirhead, Canadian historian
- Charlie Muirhead, British internet entrepreneur
- Clara Winsome Muirhead (1916-1985), Scottish botanist
- Corey Muirhead (born 1983), Canadian basketball player
- David Muirhead (1918–1999), British diplomat
- Desmond Muirhead (1923-2002), English-born American golf course designer
- Doug Muirhead (born 1962), Canadian soccer player
- Eve Muirhead (born 1990), Scottish curler
- George Muirhead (disambiguation)
- Gerald Muirhead (1931–2020), Canadian politician
- Glen Muirhead (born 1989), Scottish curler, brother of Eve and Thomas
- Gordon Muirhead, Scottish curler, father of Eve, Glen and Thomas
- Herbert Muirhead (1850–1904), British soldier, who played for the Royal Engineers in the 1872 FA Cup Final
- James Muirhead (judge) (1925–1999), Australian judge
- James Muirhead (cricketer) (born 1993), Australian cricketer
- James Patrick Muirhead (1813–1898), Scottish lawyer and author
- John Muirhead (1877–1954), Canadian politician
- John Henry Muirhead (1855–1940), British philosopher
- Lockhart Muirhead (1765–1829), Scottish librarian, museum-keeper and academic
- Lorna Muirhead, held the positions of President of the Royal College of Midwives, and Lord Lieutenant of Merseyside
- Oliver Muirhead (born 1957), English actor
- Robbie Muirhead (born 1996), Scottish footballer
- Robert Franklin Muirhead (1860–1941), Scottish mathematician
- Roland Muirhead (1868–1964), Scottish nationalist politician
- Scott Muirhead (born 1984), Scottish footballer
- Stanley Muirhead (1902–1942), American football player
- Suzie Muirhead (born 1975), New Zealand hockey player
- Thomas Muirhead (curler) (born 1995), Scottish curler, brother of Eve and Glen
- Tommy Muirhead (1897–1979), Scottish footballer
- William Muirhead, nineteenth-century Christian missionary in China
- William Muirhead (politician) (1819–1884), Canadian businessman and politician
- Gerard Muirhead-Gould (1889–1945), British Naval officer.

== See also ==
- Morehead
