= Paranjape =

Paranjape or Paranjpe or Paranjpye is a Chitpavan Brahmin surname found in Asia, South America, and the United States.

== People ==
- Anand Paranjape (born 1970), Indian politician
- Baburao Paranjpe (1922–1999), Indian politician
- Jatin Paranjpe (born 1972), Indian cricketer
- Kapil Hari Paranjape, Indian mathematician
- Laxman Vasudev Paranjape (1877–1958), Indian nationalist
- Makarand Paranjape (born 1960), Indian academic
- Nitin Paranjpe (born 1963), Indian chief executive
- Prakash Vishvanath Paranjape (1947–2008), Indian politician
- R. P. Paranjpye (1876–1966), Indian mathematician
- Ramdas Paranjpe (1912–1989), Indian lawyer
- Raja Paranjape (1910–1979), Indian actor
- Sai Paranjpye (born 1938), Indian filmmaker
- Shakuntala Paranjpye (1906–2000), Indian writer
- Shivram Mahadev Paranjape (1864–1929), Marathi writer
- Sunetra Paranjpe (born 1980), Indian cricketer
- V. V. Paranjpe (died 2010), Indian diplomat
- Vasoo Paranjape (1938–2021), Indian cricketer
- Shakuntala Paranjape (died 2019), Social Worker for the Physically Challenged and Philanthropist

== Media ==
- Savita Damodar Paranjpe, 2018 Marathi film
