= List of ambassadors of India to Ethiopia =

Head of mission of India to Ethiopia

Ambassador of India to Ethiopia
- Emblem of India

- Flag of India
- Incumbent; Anil Kumar Rai since February 2024
- Style: His Excellency
- Type: Ambassador
- Member of: Indian Foreign Service
- Reports to: Ministry of External Affairs
- Seat: Embassy of India, Addis Ababa
- Appointer: President of India
- Term length: No fixed tenure
- Website: Indian Ambassador to Ethiopia

The Ambassador of India to Federal Democratic Republic of Ethiopia is the chief diplomatic representative of India to Ethiopia, housed in the Indian Embassy located at House No. 224, Kebele 13/14, Woreda 07,Arada Sub-City, Near Bel Air Hotel, Aware, Addis Ababa, Ethiopia.

The embassy is headed by the Ambassador.

Since March 2005 the Indian Ambassadors to Ethiopia are concurrently accredited as the permanent representatives of India to the African Union.

== List of Indian Ambassadors ==
The following people have served as Ambassadors to Ethiopia.

S. No.	Name	Entered office	Left office	Note
1	Sant Singh	February 1950	October 1953	
2	Maj Gen. Hira Lal Atal	December 1953	December 1954	
3	N. S. Gill	January 1955	January 1960	
4	R. G. Rajwade	October 1960	October 1962	
5	J. K. Atal	February 1963	March 1966	
6	K. L. Mehta	March 1966	June 1968	
7	O. V. Alagesan	August 1968	August 1971	
8	K. C. Sen Gupta	October 1971	November 1973	
9	V. V. Paranjpe	June 1974	December 1977	
10	V. K. Verma	December 1977	September 1980	
11	P. K. Budhwar	November 1980	July 1983	
12	C. V. Ranganathan	December 1983	July 1985	
13	S. K. Arora	October 1985	June 1989	
14	K. P. Balakrishnan	July 1989	June 1991	
15	G. S. Bedi	July 1991	December 1992	
16	Gurucharan Singh	December 1992	March 1997	
17	K. P. Ernest	January 1998	April 2001	
18	Jordana Diengdoh Pavel	May 2002	August 2005	concurrently accredited as the permanent representative to AU since March 2005
19	Gurjit Singh	September 2005	August 2009	concurrently accredited as the permanent representative to AU
20	Bhagwant Singh Bishnoi	January 2010	November 2013	concurrently accredited as the permanent representative to AU
21	Sanjay Verma	December 2013	January 2016	concurrently accredited as the permanent representative to AU
22	Anurag Srivastava	September 2016	March 2020	concurrently accredited as the permanent representative to AU
23	Robert Shetkintong	October 2020	January 2024	concurrently accredited as the permanent representative to AU
24	Anil Kumar Rai	February 2024	Incumbent	concurrently accredited as the permanent representative to AU

== See also ==
- Ethiopia–India relations
