= Morehead =

Morehead may refer to:

== Places ==
=== Papua New Guinea ===
- Morehead Rural LLG
- Morehead River

=== United States ===
- Morehead, Kansas
- Morehead, Kentucky
- Morehead City, North Carolina
- Morehead Township, North Carolina (disambiguation)

== Schools ==
- Morehead State University, Kentucky
  - Morehead State Eagles, sports teams
- John Motley Morehead High School, Eden, North Carolina

== Other uses ==
- Morehead (surname)
- Morehead languages of New Guinea
- Morehead station, a disused heritage streetcar station in Charlotte, North Carolina

== See also ==
- Moorehead, a surname
- Moorhead (disambiguation)
