= Moorhead =

Moorhead may refer to:

- Moorhead, Minnesota, United States

Moorhead may also refer to:

== Other places ==
In the United States:

- Moorhead, Iowa
- Moorhead, Mississippi

== Other uses ==
- Moorhead (surname)
- Accrington Moorhead Sports College, Lancashire, UK
- Minnesota State University Moorhead, USA

== See also ==
- Moorehead, a surname
- Morehead (disambiguation)
