= Governor Morehead =

Governor Morehead may refer to:

- Charles S. Morehead (1802–1868), 20th Governor of Kentucky
- James Turner Morehead (Kentucky politician) (1797–1854), 12th Governor of Kentucky
- John H. Morehead (1861–1942), 17th Governor of Nebraska
- John Motley Morehead (1796–1866), 29th Governor of North Carolina
- William Ambrose Morehead (1805–1863), Governor of Madras from 1860 to 1861
