= Ramdas Paranjpe =

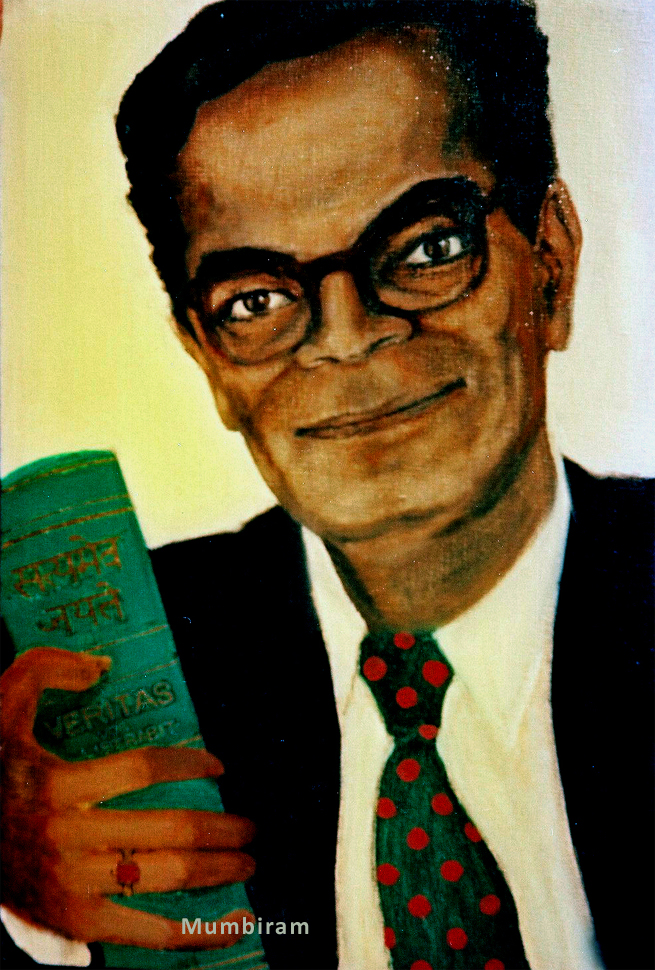
- Advocate Ramdas Paranjpe, Oil Painting by Mumbiram, Pune, 1990
- Born: Ramdas Paranjpe; 1912; Pune
- Died: 1989 (aged 76–77)
- Known for: Civil and criminal lawyer, social activist

Ramdas Paranjpe (1912–1989) was a lawyer practicing in Pune, India. He was a prominent lawyer, dealing on both civil and criminal cases in Pune's District Court and in the Bombay High Court. He was the first lawyer to defend members of the tribal Phase pardhi community, that was declared a criminal tribe during the English colonial rule. He was elected the president of the Pune Bar Association in 1963. He was also the Deputy Mayor of Pune in 1963.

== Family background ==
Ramdas Paranjpe was born in 1912 in Hanumangadh, Wardha, in central India. His father, Sadashiv Vishnu Paranjpe was a lawyer practising in Wardha. His uncle Shridhar Vishnu Paranjpe (Shri Ramdasanand) was a spiritual master in the Ramadasi tradition of Maharashtra who established an ashram in Hanumangadh in Wardha. On his mother's side he was grandson of Bhaskar Hari Bhagavat who was a founder member of the Prarthana Samaj in Mumbai. His mother was raised in the household of Rajaram Shastri Bhagavat, who was a linguist, historian, social reformer and founder of the Maratha High School. Ramdas Paranjpe's father was a cousin of mathematician R. P. Paranjpye, who was the first Indian senior Wrangler at Cambridge University, principal of Fergusson College Pune, chancellor of Pune University and the first Indian High Commissioner to Australia.

== Legal practice and achievements ==
Ramdas Paranjpe was educated in Pune and graduated from Pune's Deccan College with honors in Sanskrit and Economics. After obtaining a law degree from Bombay University he started legal practice in 1936 establishing his offices near Pune's downtown Mandai vegetable market. He was a prominent lawyer, appearing in both civil and criminal cases in Pune's District Court and in the Bombay High Court. He first attained prominence by defending the accused in the cases of burning of Brahmin homes that arose in Maharashtra after the assassination of Mahatma Gandhi by a Pune Brahmin. He was the first lawyer to defend members of the tribal Phasepardhi community that was declared a criminal tribe during the English colonial rule. He was elected the president of the Pune Bar Association in 1963. He was thrice elected to the Body Governing Pune Municipal Corporation. He had socialist inclinations and belonged to the Praja Socialist Party in the 1950s. He was the president of the Pune tenant association. In 1963 he was one of the founders of Nagari Sanghatana, which was a people's organisation, independent of political parties. Within a year of its creation it contested the elections to the city council and obtained a majority. Paranjpe himself became the deputy mayor in 1963. As a member of the city council he spearheaded the drive to rid the local government of corruption.

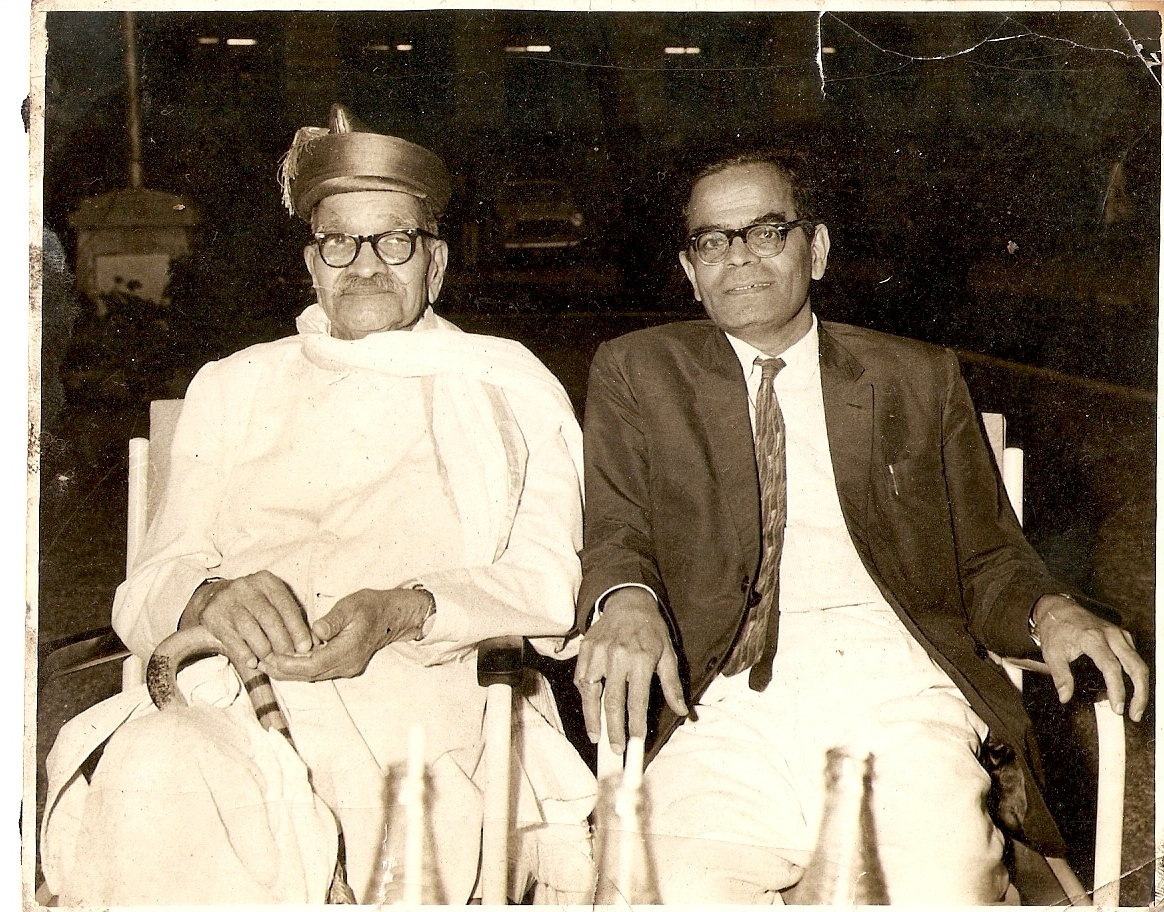
Photo of Ramdas Paranjpe and Wrangler Paranjpe, at an event of felicitation at Pune Municipal Corporation, 1963

== Art activism ==
Ramdas Paranjpe was an admirer of artist S. H. Godbole, leading watercolour artist of his time, and artist Chitrakalacharya N.E.Puram. In the 1960s Ramdas Paranjpe became the president of the Bharatiya Kala Prasarini Sabha which runs the city's first art and architecture college, the Abhinav Kala Mahavidyalaya, which was artist N.E. Puram's Art institute. Ramdas Paranjpe contributed to the fund raising activities for Puram's institute.

== Personal life ==
He was married to Anjani Godbole, who was daughter of noted watercolour artist S. H. Godbole. Anjani was an accomplished artist having won a gold medal at Bombay Art Society’s annual monsoon exhibition in Pune. Ramdas Paranjpe had three sons. His son Dhananjay obtained a PhD from the University of California, Berkeley only to abandon academics and become an artist taking nom de plume Artist Mumbiram. Artist Mumbiram is popular in the Phase Pardhi communities of Pune and Nasik districts. He is the leader of the Rasa Renaissance movement in Art. Ramdas Paranjpe retired from public life after being diagnosed with Parkinson disease in the 1970s. He died in 1989. A portrait of Ramdas Paranjpe hangs in the library of the District Court of Pune. It was inaugurated by the retired Chief Justice of the Supreme Court of India, Shri Y. V. Chandrachud, in June 1992.
