= William Morehead =

Scottish landowner

William Morehead of Herbertshire FRSE (1737–1793) was an 18th-century Scottish landowner and forefather of the Morehead dynasty of prominent persons in Scotland and India. In 1783 he was a joint founder of the Royal Society of Edinburgh.

== Life ==
He was born in 1737 in Hamilton, Lanarkshire the son of Robert Morehead, a merchant.

He studied at Glasgow University.

He died on 18 June 1793 at "Herbertshire" a mansion south of Stirling and is buried in the family burial ground at Denny nearby.

== Family ==
In 1768 he married Isabella Lockhart. Their children included Robert Morehead and his grandchildren included William Ambrose Morehead and Dr Charles Morehead, both eminent figures in India.
