= Grant Medical College and Sir J. J. Group of Hospitals =

Medical college and hospital in Mumbai, India

Coordinates: 18.964143°N 72.834750°E

Grant Government Medical College and Sir J. J. Group of Hospitals
- Motto: Mens sana in corpore sano
- Motto in English: A sound mind in a sound body
- Type: Public medical college
- Established: 1845; 181 years ago
- Founders: Jagannath Shankarseth; Sir Jamsetjee Jeejeebhoy
- Affiliations: Maharashtra University of Health Sciences, NMC
- Dean: Dr. Ravi Chavan
- Undergraduates: 250 per year
- Postgraduates: 100 per year
- Location: Mumbai, Maharashtra, India
- Nickname: Grant Medical College
- Website: www.ggmcjjh.com

The Grant Government Medical College is a public medical college located in Mumbai, India. It is affiliated to the Maharashtra University of Health Sciences. Founded in 1845, it is one of the oldest medical colleges in South Asia. Its clinical affiliate is Sir J.J. Group of Hospitals, a conglomerate of four hospitals in South Mumbai including Sir J.J. Hospital, St George Hospital, Gokuldas Tejpal Hospital and Cama and Albless Hospital.

== History ==
=== Establishment of Grant Medical College ===
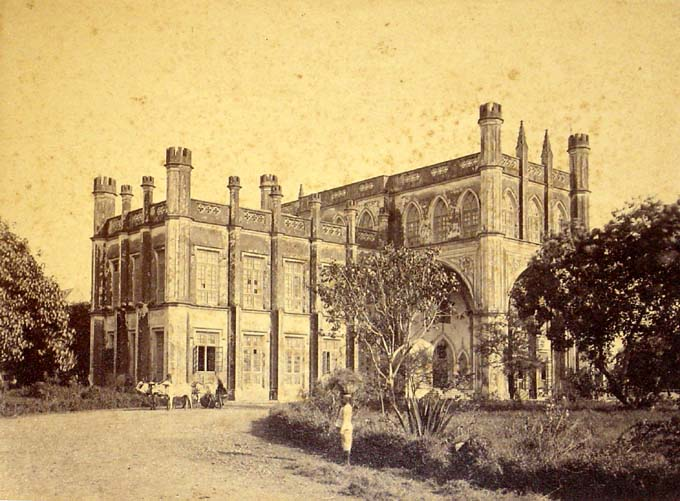
Old Grant Medical College building, 1860.

The Bombay Presidency became part of the British possessions in India in 1818. In Western India there was a need for well-trained doctors as well as a general hospital for Indians. Under the guidance of Mountstuart Elphinstone attempts were made to offer Indians an opportunity to learn and practice Medicine along western lines. In 1826, a medical school was started with surgeon John McLennan as the superintendent of the Indian (native) medical school around Azad Maidan in southern Bombay. However, this school failed after six years. Around 1840 only two medical schools existed in India, one at Calcutta and another at Madras. In 1834 Sir Robert Grant was appointed the Governor of Bombay. He directed his attention to the expediency of establishing a systematic institution in the city for imparting medical knowledge to the, which would be more complete, comprehensive and better planned than the previously abolished medical school. He instituted a detailed inquiry into the ways and means by which Indians could have better medical care and education. As he struggled and strove to push through his ambition for a wisely planned medical college in Bombay, he met strong opposition. To quell the opposition Grant envisaged the formation of the first medical society in India, The Medical and Physical Society of Bombay. It was a society that would bring together the medical officers of the Bombay Presidency and encourage a spirit of scientific enquiry. It was due to efforts of Charles Morehead (the then surgeon) to the governor that this society came into existence in November 1835.

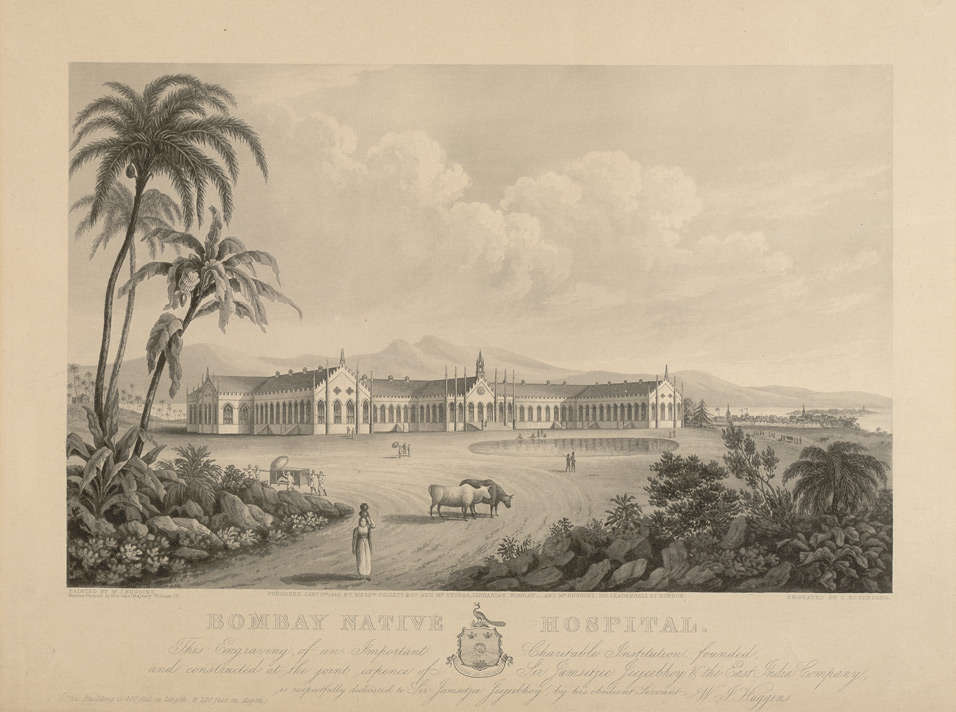
Jamshedjee Jeejeebhoy Hospital, 1843 print.

Moorehead and other members studied all the documents pertaining to the abolished medical school. They also drew up and circulated a questionnaire aimed at collecting information on the current medical practices among the Indians. It was also intended to help educate Indians in European medicine. In July 1837, the Society reported that "the conclusion to which we have been led by this course of inquiry is that the establishment of a medical school for the education of the Indians of the presidency in medical science is necessary, to the extent of qualifying Indians to become useful and safe practitioners of medicine."

Grant developed a proposal in March 1838 in which the subject of medical education for the Indians of this presidency was fully discussed in detail. It was sent to Sir Auckland's government in Calcutta. In March 1838 Sir, Jamsetjee Jeejebhoy offered a donation of Rs. 1 lakh for building a new general hospital for Indians. Grant took note of this in his minute, adding that the hospital would facilitate medical instruction. The East India Company, as conveyed in its letter dated 18 July 1838, happily endorsed the proposal for a medical college. However, nine days before the arrival of this news, Grant succumbed to an attack of cerebral apoplexy while vacationing in Dapori, near Pune.

A historic public meeting was held in the town hall by the citizens of Bombay to mourn his death. The Sanskrit scholar Jagannath Shankarsheth proposed that it would be a fitting tribute that the medical college should be established and that it should bear his name. The government accepted this proposal. The foundation stone of the building was laid on 30 March 1843, and the building was completed in October 1845.

Simultaneously with the plans and foundation of the college, it was also decided, with the aid of a munificent donation offered by Sir Jamsetjee Jeejebhoy, to replace the previously existing Indian general hospital in the city, by creating a "School of Practice" (now known as the Sir J.J. Hospital) near the hospital and in conjunction with it. The professors of the medical college also served as the medical officers of the hospital. The foundation stone was laid on 3 January 1843 and the School of Practice was opened for reception of the sick from 15 May 1845. In 1845, admittance to the college was accorded without exception for caste or creed to candidates between the ages of 16 and 20 with respectable connection and general intelligence; grammatical knowledge of their vernacular language, arithmetic including Rules of Proportion and a thorough knowledge of English with fluency was expected. Each candidate was required to present a certificate of good conduct from the headmaster of the school in which he had studied and also one expressly stating that he was possessed of the necessary information and capable of undergoing the examination proposed.

The entrance examination was conducted by the superintendent and the professors of the college. The books selected for testing the knowledge of English were Milton's Paradise Lost, Robertson's Histories, or a similar classical standard.

The first group of students admitted to the Grant Medical College, Bombay, on 1 November 1845 were:

Grant Medical College in the Illustrated London News, 8 October 1859, print from a photograph by H. Hinton.

- Free: Bhau Daji Parsekar, Monoel A.D. Carvalho, Sebestian A.D. Carvalho
- Stipendary: Atmaram Pandurang, Paul Francis Gomes, Fardemjee Jamshetji, Ananta Chandroba Dkule, Manoel Antonio D'Abrew, J.C. Lisoba who became the professor of Anatomy and Surgery, the President of the Grant Medical College Society for 10 years and of the Bombay Medical Association for 4 years.

The first professors of Grant Medical College were Charles Morehead, M.D., FRCS, Professor of the Institute of Practice of Medicine, Dr. John Peet, M.D., FRCS, Professor of Anatomy and Surgery and Dr. Herbert John Giraud, M.D., Professor of Chemistry and Materia Medica.

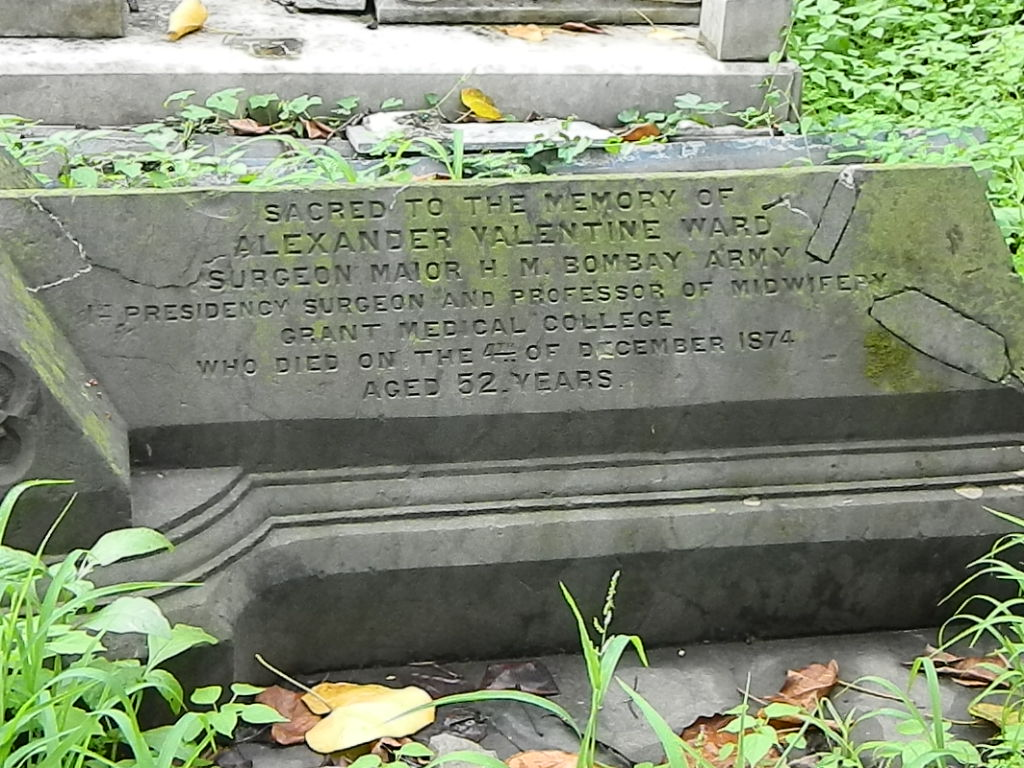
Early Professor of Midwifery of Grant College

In 1849 two more teachers joined the college. Dr. W. C. Colls taught Medical Jurisprudence and Dr. R. D. Peele taught Midwifery.

Attendance was not quite satisfactory during the first year. In following years, however, it became so good that students declined to take advantage of holidays but preferred to attend classes.

The Bombay University was founded in 1857. In 1860, Grant Medical College became one of the four colleges recognized by it for teaching courses leading to degrees (others being Elphinstone College, Deccan College and Government Law College, Mumbai). With its affiliation to the university, GMC's entrance exams were abolished. Matriculation in Bombay University was made a necessary qualification for admission to the Medical College. The G.G.M.C. degree was replaced by L.M. (Licentiate of Medicine) which later gave way to L.M.&S. (Licentiate of Medicine and Surgery) and finally to M.B.B.S.

=== Gradual expansion of Sir J.J. Hospital ===
Immediately after the First World War, there was a great rush of students to the college. To continue to provide effective instruction training at the bedside of patients, the Gokuldas Tejpal Hospital was used as a teaching center in the subjects of Medicine and Surgery in 1924. This arrangement has continued to date.

Gradually the facilities at the Sir J.J. Group of Hospitals were also increased. The Sir Leslie Wilson Hospital Fund played an important part. The Yellappa Balaram pavilion (104 beds), Sir David Sassoon Hospital (97 beds and O.T.), Byramjee Jejeebhoy Hospital for Children (100 beds) were constructed and the Sir C.J. Ophthalmic Hospital was reconstructed (adding 73 beds).

The students had to stay in chawls opposite the compound until 1911 when the old hostel was built. In 1938, the R.M. Bhatt hostel was built thanks to the efforts of C.S. Patel and Col. Bhatia — one of the most respected teacher of his time.

The Pathology Department was established in 1880; the first autopsy was conducted in 1882. In 1896, Sir V.M. Haffkine/Waldemar Haffkine worked on the preparation of plague vaccine in the F.D. Petit Laboratory of G.M.C. (which is today occupied by Pharmacology Department).

Robert Koch's work on Vibrio cholerae was done in two rooms of the old animal house behind coroner's court. Henry Vandyke Carter, after whom the O.P.D. Laboratory of Sir J.J.H. is named discovered in the pathology department the spirochaetes of relapsing fever in blood smears in 1907. It was here that Christopher and Caval worked on malaria and Dr. Raghavendra Rao worked in on tropical diseases, leprosy, plague and leishmaniasis.

In 1929, the department was shifted to the new building of Pathology School thanks to the munificence of the Tatas. Dr. V. R. Khanolkar the doyen of Pathology in India initiated work on cancer epidemiology. He was the founder member and the first president of the Indian Association of Pathologists in 1949. Dr. P.V. Gharpure started the Pathology Museum and the Association of Teaching Pathologists in Bombay.

The first M.D. of Bombay University was Dr. Anna Moreshwar Kunte in 1876. Another GMCite Dr. K.N. Bahadurji was the first Indian to obtain M.D. from London (MB & BS 1886, MD 1887). He died of plague in 1896 while in charge of the Parsi Plague Hospital. In his memory the Student Sick Ward was built. This was torn down and replaced in 1908 to make room for the William Moore Operation Theatre.

Initially in 1845, J.J. Hospital had only a casualty and an Out Patient Department with a dispensary behind it. Soon in 1851, the Obstetric institution was built thanks to Sir J.J.'s donations. In 1892, the Obstetric ward became the Parsee ward.

In 1866, the Ophthalmic Hospital was erected by the donation given by Sir Cowasjee Jehangirjee. In 1930 it was remodeled by Sir J. Duggan in a three-storeyed building remodeled it for which Sir Cowasjee Jehangir, Third Baronet, donated a large sum. This was later reformed as the O.P.D. In this small place also existed the Medical Department, Minor Surgery, E.N.T. Department, and Dental chair. From 1907 to 1928 this was converted into biology and bacteriology laboratories.

The General Medical Council found that the facilities for teaching midwifery were deficient in G.M.C. To overcome this problem, Bai Motlibai and Cama Albless, both Parsis, The Change Makers affiliated their Hospitals to G.M.C. by 1923. Parsis – The Change Makers

=== Non-cooperation movement ===
During the early 1900s all prestigious professional posts were held by British I.M.S. officers, while Indians were given only non-clinical appointments. In 1921, the Non-cooperation movement appealed to GMCites to boycott the British government by leaving G.M.C. Students, professors and practitioners began shifting to Topiwala National Medical College near Victoria Gardens. Masses were held between 6-8 p.m. for medical students by famous medical practitioners, all GMCites. To prove that Indians themselves could build and maintain medical institutions without British support, the K.E.M. Hospital and Seth G.S. Medical College where the entire staff was Indian were founded in 1926.

=== Post-independence reconstructions ===
The greatest change to G.M.C. and J.J.H. came in 1958 when the old J.J. building was torn down and replaced by a seven-storeyed hospital building. The O.P.D. was extended to contain Investigation Laboratories. Today it is spread over 44 acres (18 ha) in Byculla with 14 gates, a long jump from the two-room teaching hospital in an area of 4 acres (16,000 m^{2}).

== The J. J. Hospital Campus ==
The medical college is situated in Byculla on the campus of Sir J. J. Hospital. The hospital has 2844 beds and caters to an annual load of 1,200,000 out-patients and 80,000 in-patients, from all parts of Maharashtra and central India. The campus is the largest of any medical colleges in Mumbai. It is spread out over 44 acres (180,000 m^{2}) in the Byculla area of South Mumbai. The campus is notable for its greenery and open spaces in an otherwise congested part of the city. With gradual additions and expansions since its initial foundation, the campus has a mix of buildings depicting both modern Indian and Colonial architecture. As the campus expanded it incorporated hospitals that were originally independent before being absorbed into J.J. Hospital and thus retain some of their older names, notably: C.J. Ophthalmic Hospital, B.J. Hospital for children and the David Sassoon Hospital. The campus has a total of 45 wards, 5 hostels and 7 canteens. It also provides residential facilities to its teaching faculty, resident doctors, medical students, nurses and other hospital workers. The anatomy hall of Grant Medical College was featured in the movie Munna Bhai M.B.B.S. as central lecture hall in the fictional medical school attended by the lead character. In addition to the main campus situated at Byculla, it also has a sea facing gymkhana at marine drive in south Mumbai. Recently The JJ hospital campus also includes the Richardson Cruddas building next to it for research purposes .

== The Research Society ==
The Research Society started functioning in 1965 in the Skin & Serology Department building on the second floor with an office and research library and a proposed space for a research laboratory. However, the laboratory proposal has not been entertained so far. It has the following aims and objectives:

- To promote and encourage research and medical science in departments of GMC & J.J.H.
- Sponsor all such activities conducted to promotion of medical science & all such measures to fulfill objectives.

The founder members were Dr. J. G. Parekh, Dr. S. J. Shah, Dr. V. C. Talwalkar, Dr. J.C. Joshipura and Dr. B. B. Gaitonde.

It awards post graduate students for the best research paper and for the best thesis. It sponsors scientific conferences, medical workshops and symposia.

== Notable alumni ==
- Atmaram Pandurang, Initial batch student-physician, founded Prarthana Samaj, social reformist, briefly Sheriff of Bombay
- José Camillo Lisboa Initial batch student-physician, Professor of Anatomy & Surgery, later Private surgery, the President of the Grant Medical College Society for 10 years and of the Bombay Medical Association for 4 years.
- Bhau Daji, Initial batch student-physician, Sanskrit scholar, and an antiquarian
- Sakharam Arjun-Sakharam Arjun Raut; avoided Raut caste reference in publications- Botanicals scholar; stepfather of the first woman medical graduate, alumnus Rukhmabai Raut and second in India; possibly as she worked in Rajkot and confusion and similarly name person needs to be sorted out.
- Kanhoba Ranchoddas Kirtikar Lt-Colonel in Afghan war & contemporary of Sakharam Arjun
- Vithal Nagesh Shirodkar, obstetrician and gynaecologist
- Reita Faria, Indian model and Miss World 1966.
- Aditi Govitrikar, Indian model and actress Mrs. World 2001
- Jivraj Narayan Mehta, first Chief Minister of Gujarat
- Laxman Vasudev Paranjape, acting Sarsanghchalak (Chief) of Rashtriya Swayamsevak Sangh.
- Anuj Saxena
- Khan Abdul Jabbar Khan, also known as Dr. Khan Sahib, brother of Khan Abdul Gaffar Khan (Frontier Gandhi) and the first chief minister of West Pakistan.
- N. H. Wadia, founder and first head of the department of Neurology.
- Devdutt Pattanaik, mythologist, speaker, illustrator and author
- Gieve Patel, poet, playwright, painter and practicing physician
- Noshir H. Antia, founder and first head of the department of Plastic Surgery
- Luis Jose De Souza, Padma Shri awardee
- Shantilal Jamnadas Mehta, Surgeon and Padma Bhushan awardee
- Shantilal C. Sheth, former president of the Medical Council of India and Padma Bhushan awardee
- Subhash Bhamre, Union Minister of State for Defence, India (from July 2016) and Member of Parliament of 16th LokSabha from Dhule Constituency and an oncologist by profession.
- Muffazal Lakdawala, Bariatric surgeon
- Vimla Virmani, neurologist

== See also ==
- List of colleges in Mumbai
- Waldemar Haffkine
