= Virmani =

Virmani is an Indian (Khatri) surname. Notable people with the surname include:

- Arundhati Virmani (born 1957), Indian historian
- Arvind Virmani (born 1949), Indian economist
- Sant Singh Virmani (fl. 1970s–2000s), Indian American agricultural scientist
- Shabnam Virmani (fl. 1990s–2020s), Indian film director
- Vimla Virmani (1919–1999), Indian neurologist

== See also ==
- Virman Vundabar, Comics character
