= M. V. Padma Srivastava =

Indian neurologist, medical academic and writer

- Born: 1965 (age 60–61); Delhi, India
- Occupations: Neurologist; Medical academic
- Known for: Acute Stroke Program; Medical writing
- Children: One son
- Awards: Padma Shri; NAMS Vimla Virmani Award

Madakasira Vasantha Padma Srivastava (born 1965) is an Indian neurologist, medical academic, former professor and writer, serving as the chairperson of Neurology at Paras Healthcare, Gurugram. She is known for pioneering Acute Stroke Programme (Code-Red), a medical initiative for supporting patients afflicted with epilepsy and stroke, incorporating Hyperacute Reperfusion strategies including the thrombolysis program. The Government of India awarded her the fourth highest civilian honour of the Padma Shri, in 2016, for her contributions to medical science.

== Biography ==
Padma Srivastava, born in 1965, secured her master's degree in neurology from the All India Institute of Medical Sciences in 1990 before starting her career with her alma mater where she is the professor of neurology. One of her main contributions to medical science is the initiation of the program, Code-Red, at AIIMS which incorporates Hyperacute Reperfusion strategies, reportedly a first in public sector in India. She also contributed to the establishment of a comprehensive epilepsy program at AIIMS and is involved in government-funded research on Stroke and cerebral palsy. She is associated with the SITS-NEW registry for thrombolysis for stroke data from India as well as the SITS-SEARS registry with the Karolinska Institutet as their national coordinator and sits in the councils of National Stroke Surveillance program for India, the National Stroke Registry, the National Prevention Programs for Noncommunicable Diseases of India.

Srivastava delivered the 2006–07 Achanta Laxmipathy Oration of the National Academy of Medical Sciences and the K. L. Wig Oration of the Association of Physicians of India and is a recipient of Vimla Virmani Award of NAMS. The National Academy of Sciences, India elected her as their fellow in 2013. She served as the national president of the Indian Stroke Association during 2013–14. She is a former member of the organizing committee of the Indo-US Science and Technology Forum (IUSSTF) and a visiting professor at the Department of Neurology of the University of Massachusetts Boston. She also sits in many task forces of the Ministry of Science and Technology, Indian Council of Medical Research (ICMR) and the Department of Biotechnology and is an external examiner of higher academic courses on neurology of many medical institutions. She is a member of the specialty board for neurology of the National Board of Examinations and the Institute Body of the Sree Chitra Tirunal Institute for Medical Sciences and Technology, Thiruvananthapuram. She has edited one book, Controversies in stroke care, published over 200 medical papers and articles, contributed chapters to books published by others and has served on the editorial boards of many journals. She is an elected fellow of the National Academy of Medical Sciences (NAMS) where she is also a council member. The Government of India awarded her the civilian honor of the Padma Shri in 2016. She serves as the professor of neurology at the All India Institute of Medical Sciences, New Delhi in years including 2016. As of 2023, she is the chairperson of Neurology at Paras Healthcare, Gurugram.

== See also ==
- Epilepsy
- Stroke
- Multiple sclerosis
