= Beatrix Marion Sturt =

Scottish author and contributor to the Dictionary of National Biography

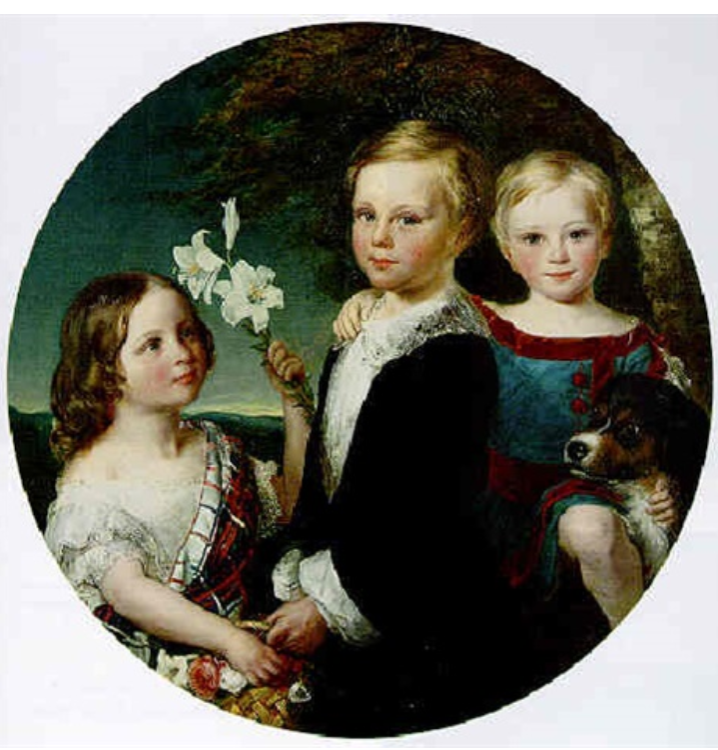
Beatrix Sturt as a child in an 1853 painting, pictured with her brothers Francis Montagu Muirhead and Herbert Hugh Muirhead

Beatrix Marion Sturt (21 November 1849 – 28 April 1944) was a British writer who contributed articles to the Dictionary of National Biography.

Beatrix Marion Muirhead was born in Hastings, England, in 1849. Her father was the Scottish lawyer James Patrick Muirhead.

In 1876, she married Napier George Sturt, an Australian-born colonel, in Thame, England. The couple had three children.

After being widowed in 1901, she settled for a period in Llanfrynach, in Wales. There, she became active in home-front fundraising efforts during World War I. She was also a vocal advocate for women's suffrage.

Sturt's primary legacy is as a biographer, including of her father-in-law, the Australian explorer Charles Sturt. Her flattering 1899 biography of him is titled The Life of Charles Sturt. She also contributed several entries to the Dictionary of National Biography, under the initials B.M.S. and B.N.S.

She spent the majority of her later years in Bewdley, England, where she died in 1944 at age 95.
