= Moorehead =

Moorehead (Irish (eastern Ulster): variant of Muirhead) is a surname. Notable people with the surname include:

- Aaron Moorehead (born 1980), American football player
- Agnes Moorehead (1900–1974), American actress
- Alan Moorehead (1910–1983), Australian writer and journalist
- Emery Moorehead (born 1954), former American football player
- Monica Moorehead (born 1952), American politician

== See also ==
- Moorhead (disambiguation)
- Morehead (disambiguation)
