= Shantilal Jamnadas Mehta =

Indian surgeon and academic

- Born: 10 January 1905; Surendranagar district, Saurashtra, Bombay Presidency, British India
- Died: 21 June 1997 (aged 92)
- Occupations: Surgeon; Medical academic
- Years active: 1927–1991
- Known for: Jaslok Hospital and Research Centre
- Spouse: Champaben
- Awards: Padma Bhushan; RCS Hallett Prize

Shantilal Jamnadas Mehta (1905–1997) was an Indian surgeon, institution builder and medical academic, who established the Jaslok Hospital and Research Centre, Mumbai. His contributions were also reported in the establishment of Tata Memorial Centre and the All India Institute of Medical Sciences, Delhi. In 1971, the Government of India awarded him the third highest civilian honour of the Padma Bhushan for his contributions to medicine.

== Biography ==
Mehta was born on 10 January 1905 in Surendranagar district in the Saurashtra of the Indian city of Gujarat. Due to lack of good educational facilities in his native town, he stayed with his maternal grandfather, Motilal Kothari, in Rajkot and did his schooling there. Later, when Kothari moved to Mumbai, Mehta followed him to continue his education there and it was during this time, he developed a fascination for ayurveda when he was cured by an ayurvedic physician from a life-threatening bout of dysentery, after allopathic treatment yielded no positive results.

His graduate degree in medicine came from Grant Medical College and Sir Jamshedjee Jeejeebhoy Group of Hospitals, during which time he was also involved with the Indian independence movement and suffered incarceration at Colaba Police Station after he, along with five other activists, showed black flag at the visiting Simon Commission in 1927. Later, when he went to England for fellowship at the Royal College of Surgeons of England, his earlier involvement in the freedom struggle caused him many difficulties but he completed the fellowship, winning the Hallett Prize, the first Indian to receive the honour. Subsequently, he worked for 9 months at the Royal Brompton Hospital, at ENT, Orthopedic and general surgery departments, where he had the opportunity to train under several notable surgeons.

On his return to India in 1930, he joined Grant Medical College, his alma mater, as a member of faculty and an honorary surgeon. During World War II, when British Army took over the hospital for treating armed personnel injured in the war, he was accorded the honorary rank of a Colonel, which he declined. He worked at the hospital, moving up through the ranks, from Associate Professor to Professor, till his superannuation in 1960, and continued his association with the institution for another ten years, in the capacity of the Emeritus Professor. While his tenure at GMC, he was also involved with the establishment of the Association of Surgeons of India in 1938 and the Tata Memorial Centre in 1941. After his retirement from GMC, he also served as the personal surgeon of Indira Gandhi.

Mehta was one of the Indian medical personnel involved in the establishment of the National Academy of Medical Sciences in 1961, and was a founder fellow of the Academy. In 1973, when an Indian-born British philanthropist, Seth Lokoomal Chanrai, decided to set up a hospital, he entrusted the project to Mehta, which resulted in the founding of Jaslok Hospital. He worked as the medical director of the hospital and established several specialty departments; the institution has since grown to become a multi-specialty tertiary care hospital. He chaired the Medical Education Review Committee (later known as the Mehta Committee) of the Ministry of Health and Family Welfare, Government of India, in 1982, which proposed guidelines for medical education in India. Later, he was also associated with Swami Prakashanava Ayurvedic Research Centre. He received the third highest civilian honour of the Padma Bhushan in 1971.

Mehta, who was married to Champaben, suffered from age-related illnesses towards the later stages of his life and died on 21 June 1997, at the age of 92. Dr. Shantilal J. Mehta Medical Research Foundation is a medical research foundation operating in Mumbai which has been named after him.
