= Noshir H. Antia =

Indian plastic surgeon and social worker

N. H. Antia
- Born: 8 February 1922; Hubli, Karnataka, India
- Died: 26 June 2007 (aged 85)
- Other name: Noshir Hormasji Antia
- Occupations: Plastic surgeon social worker
- Years active: 1945–2007
- Known for: Plastic surgery
- Spouse: Arnie Noshir Batliwala
- Children: One son and one daughter
- Parent(s): Hormasji Merwanji; Soonamai
- Awards: Padma Shri; G. D. Birla International Award; Karma Yogi Puraskar

Noshir Hormasji Antia (8 February 1922 – 26 June 2007) was an Indian plastic surgeon and social worker, known for his pioneering contributions to the treatment and rehabilitation of people afflicted with leprosy. He was the founder of three notable non governmental organizations, Foundation for Research in Community Health (FRCH), Foundation for Medical Research (FMR) and the National Society for Equal Opportunities for the Handicapped (NASEOH), all working in the field of rehabilitation of patients, cured or otherwise. The Government of India awarded him the fourth highest civilian award of Padma Shri in 1990.

== Biography ==
N. H. Antia was born on 8 February 1922 at Hubli, in northern Karnataka in India in a middle class Parsi family to Hormasji Merwanji and Soonamai and did hs schooling at his native place and the nearby Belgaum. When his family moved to Mumbai, he continued his education there and completed the pre-graduate course from the Fergusson College, Pune. He graduated in medicine from Grant Medical College and Sir Jamshedjee Jeejeebhoy Group of Hospitals, Mumbai in 1945 to start his career by joining the British Indian Army, as a medical officer, where he worked for two years. He retired from the Army in 1947, the year when India became independent, to move to UK for higher studies and studied under Harold Gillies, considered by many as the Father of Plastic Surgery, He worked under the New Zealand born surgeon for nine years as well as under A. B. Wallace, who pioneered the treatment of burns, during which period, he obtained a fellowship of the Royal College of Surgeons, the degree (FRCS) conferred on him in 1952.

His initial posting, after return from UK in 1956, was at Jehangir Hospital, Pune as a general surgeon but he also practised plastic surgery there. This gave him the opportunity to get associated with Dr Bandorawalla Government Leprosy Hospital, Kondhwa where he practised reconstructive surgery among the leprosy patients which received attention from the State government who invited him to establish a department of plastic surgery at Grant Medical College and Sir Jamshedjee Jeejeebhoy Group of Hospitals. The unit, first such unit in Western India, was inaugurated in 1958, by his mentor, Harold Gillies and became known as Tata Department of Plastic Surgery. The department grew to accommodate burns, hand surgery and leprosy surgery under separate sections and it was here, Antia performed the first microvascular free flap surgery.

Antia married Arnie Noshir Batliwala on 6 October 1957, a year after his return from the UK, and the couple had two children, son, Rustom and daughter, Avan. He died on 26 June 2007 at the age of 85. His life story has been published as an autobiography, A Life of Change: The Autobiography of a Doctor, brought out by Penguin India in 2009.

== Positions and legacy ==
Antia headed the Tata Department of Plastic Surgery for 22 years till 1980 and is credited with transforming the centre into a recognised training school for the plastic surgeons in India. Here he pioneered the leprosy surgery and continued his researches. He also had a two-year stint in London, doing his researches in Immunology. While heading the Tata Department, he worked for the parent hospital, J. J. Hospital, as a professor of plastic surgery at their medical college. He was one of the founders of the Association of Plastic Surgeons of India (1957) and the National Societies for Burns and Hand Surgery. He published 5 books and over 350 articles and contributed content to several other books, where his medical researches have been documented.

In 1975, Antia gathered a few colleagues and founded the Foundation for Research in Community Health (FRCH), and started training local women of Mandwa and neighbouring villages of the Raigad district of Maharashtra, preparing them to fight against water borne diseases, leprosy, tuberculosis, malaria and respiratory tract infections and taught them the values of family planning. He expanded his activities later, by founding another organization, Foundation for Medical Research (FMR), to supplement the efforts of FRCH, and was the director of both the organizations since their inception in 1975. His contributions were also reported in the establishment of another non governmental organization, National Society for Equal Opportunities for the Handicapped (NASEOH), started in 1968.

== Awards and recognitions ==
Antia was a fellow of the Royal College of Surgeons of London and the American College of Surgeons. His professional work earned him the Huntarian professorship of the Royal College of Surgeons of England and the Maliniac Lecturership of the American Society of Plastic and Reconstructive Surgeons. He was the Clayton Memorial lecturer of the Royal College of Surgeons of England, Gilles and Sushruta orator of the Association of Plastic Surgeons of India and Pandalai Orator of Association of Surgeons of India. He delivered the Dr. B. B. Joshi Oration at the Annual Conference of the Indian Society for Surgery of the Hand, Bangalore on 8 December 2003, besides several other keynote addresses.

Antia was the honorary surgeon to the President of India and the Governor of Maharashtra on different occasions. The Government of India awarded him the civilian honour of Padma Shri in 1990 and he received the G. D. Birla International Award for Humanism in 1994. He was also a recipient of the Karma Yogi Puraskar in 2006.

== See also ==
- Grant Medical College and Sir Jamshedjee Jeejeebhoy Group of Hospitals
- Harold Gillies
