= José Camillo Lisboa =

Portuguese physician and botanist (1823–1897)

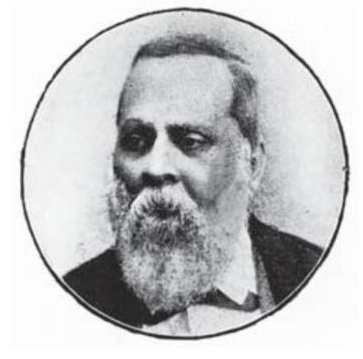
- Born: 5 March 1823; Assagão, Goa, Portuguese India
- Died: 1 May 1897 (aged 74); Poona, British India
- Education: Grant Medical College (1851)
- Spouse: Julia Lisboa

José Camillo Lisboa (5 March 1823 – 1 May 1897) was a Portuguese physician and botanist. He was among the first Portuguese-Goan physicians and graduated from the inaugural class of the Grant Medical College in Bombay, British India. After graduating in 1851, he worked as a doctor at the Jamsetjee Jeejeebhoy Hospital in Bombay. Along with his wife Julia Rodrigues Lisboa, he studied the grasses of western India and published a special volume on the useful plants of the region as part of the Gazetteer of the Bombay Presidency in 1886.

== Early life and career ==
Lisboa was born in Assagão, Bardes, son of Antonio Xavier Lisboa. His early education was at home under an uncle who was also a priest. He then studied in the Parish Music School before going to Margão where he studied Portuguese, Latin, mathematics and history. He studied at the 22nd Regiment School in Poona, British India and was among the first eight students to study at the Grant Medical College in Bombay and graduated in 1851. He then worked briefly as a sub-assistant surgeon under British surgeon John Peet at the Jamsetjee Jeejeebhoy Hospital and Grant Medical College and then began a private practice after rejecting a transfer to Karachi, British India (now part of Pakistan). In 1871, Lisboa established the Grémio Lusitano where he gave lectures on the plants of the Bible. He was elected a member of the Bombay Natural History Society (BNHS) in 1886 and took a keen interest in botany, publishing in the society's journal specializing later on the grasses. He also examined floral and climate change in Mahabaleshwar.

== Personal life ==
Lisboa married Júlia Rodrigues (1840–1926), daughter of Prof. António Filipe Rodrigues. She too was interested in botany and independently contributed notes on grasses to the Journal of the BNHS. In 1886 he also compiled a list of useful plants in the Bombay Presidency classified by usage including a list of plants eaten during famines. This was published as a part of the Gazetteer of Bombay Presidency edited by James Macnabb Campbell after whom Lisboa named a plant Arundinella campbelliana (now considered a synonym of Jansenella griffithiana).

Lisboa was politically outspoken and was a supporter of Padroado (Note: For more on the schism see Hull (1920)) favouring the accountability of the King of Portugal and wrote in the bilingual newspaper Abelha de Bombaim. He was also a supporter of the Konkani language and active in the Instituto Luso-Indiano.

== Death and legacy ==
After the death of Lisboa at his home in Poona in 1897 following paralysis some months prior, Julia established a Gold Medal at the Bombay University with an award of ₹6,000 (equivalent to ₹1.8 million or US$19,000 in 2023). Lisboa had himself established a scholarship in botany at the Grant Medical College in 1882. The Assagão Union founded a school in his memory in 1923 called the Dr J C Lisboa School which existed until 1951.

Lisboa's medical studies including those on leprosy (where he tried the extracts of Psoralea corylifolia), and the medical properties of opium. He was one of the witnesses who gave evidence to the Indian Hemp Commission where he was in favour of moderate use of opium for relief under certain circumstances. Lisboa served also as a Justice of Peace, had been a member of the Bombay Natural History Society, the Asiatic Society of Bombay, a fellow of the Linnean Society of London (elected 1888, withdrew 1893, re-elected 1894), the Geographical and Medical Society of Lisbon and the Academie Internationale de Geographique Botanique. A road in Assagao is named after him. The grasses Tripogon lisboae and Ischaemum lisboae have been named after Júlia R. Lisboa who corresponded with botanists in England after the death of her husband (her name is sometimes given in the Portuguese form as Donna Lisboa). (Note: Note that some works like Clifford & Bostock (2007) incorrectly attribute it to J.C. Lisboa. The Latin ending -ae is feminine.)
