= Jaslok Hospital =

Geography
- Location: Mumbai, Maharashtra, India
- Coordinates: 18.971622°N 72.80973°E

Services
- Emergency department: Yes
- Beds: 343

History
- Founded: 1973

Links
- Website: jaslokhospital.net
- Lists: Hospitals in India

Jaslok Hospital and Research Centre is a private hospital located in Mumbai was founded by philanthropist Seth Lokoomal Chanrai along with surgeon Shantilal Jamnadas Mehta. The hospital was formally inaugurated on 6 July 1973 by the erstwhile Prime Minister, Indira Gandhi.

The hospital got substantial publicity in the late 1970s when Jayaprakash Narayan was admitted for treatment of kidney failure by the nephrologist M. K. Mani. Narayan died there in 1979.

In the early 1980s the laboratories run there by P. R. Krishnaswamy had the first fully automated Kontron biochemistry analyzers, an electron microscope and an aminoacid analyser.

The India's first recorded AIDS/HIV victim died at the hospital on 9 June 1986, after a fortnight's treatment.

The facility suffered during unrest led by trade unionist Datta Samant. On 17 October 1979, after severing the gas, water and telephone connections and crippling the labour force in the hospital, the management had to shift nearly 294 patients to other hospitals in the city. Dr Rindani, the then medical director, stood firm, The police were called in and a court injunction prohibiting assembly of the agitating workers was obtained. Samant had to back down for the first time in his brand of union activities.

Jaslok Hospital is located at Peddar Road, South Mumbai, overlooking the Arabian Sea.

The name Jaslok is a combination of the names of Seth Lokoomal and his wife, Jasotibai.

== Hospital Facilities ==
Jaslok hospital is a multi-speciality hospital offering the following facilities:

- Total No of Beds: 343
- Non ICU Beds: 255
- ICU Beds: 58

== Accreditations ==
Jaslok Hospital has received certification from National Accreditation Board for Hospitals & Healthcare Providers (NABH) which is a constituent board of Quality Council of India (QCI), set up to establish and operate accreditation programme for healthcare organizations. This certification is currently valid from 23 June 2019 to 22 June 2022.
