= Morehead Township, North Carolina =

Morehead Township, North Carolina may refer to one of the following places in the State of North Carolina:

- Morehead Township, Carteret County, North Carolina
- Morehead Township, Guilford County, North Carolina

== See also ==
- Morehead (disambiguation)
