= Shantilal C. Sheth =

Indian medical professional (1912–1990)

- Born: October 29, 1912; Palitana, Gujarat, India
- Died: January 24, 1990 (aged 77)
- Occupation: Pediatrician
- Years active: 1937–1990
- Spouse: Hiralaxmi Sheth
- Children: A son and a daughter
- Parent: Chhaganlal Narandas Sheth
- Awards: Padma Bhushan

Shantilal Chhaganlal Sheth (1912–1990) was an Indian pediatrician and the president of several medical institutions including the Medical Council of India, the apex body for matters related to medical administration and education in India. An honorary surgeon commander at the Indian Navy, he served as the honorary physician to the President of India. The Government of India awarded him the third highest civilian honour of the Padma Bhushan, in 1972, for his contributions to medicine.

== Biography ==
Born on 29 October 1912 at Palitana, in the Indian state of Gujarat in a Jain family to Chhaganlal Narandas Sheth, an auditor, Sheth did his early education at Harris High School, Palitana and graduated in medicine from Grant Medical College and Sir Jamshedjee Jeejeebhoy Group of Hospitals, Mumbai in 1937. After his residency at his alma mater, he secured a post graduate degree in pediatrics (DCH) from the UCL Institute of Child Health in 1947 and joined Topiwala National Medical College and B. Y. L. Nair Hospital in 1948 as an honorary director and the head of the pediatrics department where he worked for a while. Later, he also worked at Kasturba City Fever Hospital and the Bhatia General Hospital, both local hospitals in Mumbai.

Sheth was involved with medical administration in India in various capacities. His efforts were reported in the formation of the Indian Academy of Paediatrics by the merger of the Indian Paediatric Society and the Association of Paediatricians of India in 1962, after which he served as the general secretary and the president of the academy. When the Ministry of Health and Family Welfare constituted the Committee on Essential Drugs in 1966, he was nominated as a member though the tenure was short. He was the president of the Indian Medical Association (IMA) during 1965–66 and served as the president of the Medical Council of India from 1965 to 1975. On the academic front, he published several medical papers in peer reviewed national and international journals. An honorary fellow of the American Academy of Pediatrics and the Royal College of Physicians of London, he was elected as a fellow of the Indian Academy of Sciences in 1965. He served as the honorary physician to the President of India and the Indian Navy honored him with an honorary rank of the Surgeon Commander. The Government of India included him the Republic Day Honours list in 1972 for the civilian award of the Padma Bhushan.

Shantilal Sheth was married to Hiralaxmi and the couple had a son and a daughter. The son, Shirish Sheth, is a known gynecologist and medical academic while the daughter, Leena Dasani, is a chartered accountant. Sheth died on 24 January 1990, at the age of 77. The Academy of Pediatrics, Manipal, has instituted an annual oration, Dr. Shantilal C. Sheth Guest Oration, in his honor.

== See also ==
- Grant Medical College and Sir Jamshedjee Jeejeebhoy Group of Hospitals
- Indian Academy of Pediatrics
