= Herbert John Giraud =

English physician, chemist, and botanist

- Born: 14 April 1817; Faversham
- Died: January 12, 1888 (aged 70); Shanklin, Isle of Wight
- Occupations: Physician; chemist; botanist

Herbert John Giraud (14 April 1817 – 12 January 1888) was an English physician, chemist, and botanist.

== Biography ==
Giraud was the second son and youngest child of John Thomas Giraud (1764–1836), a surgeon at Faversham, Kent (mayor in 1814), by Mary, daughter of William Chapman of Badlesmere Court, Kent. He was born at Faversham on 14 April 1817. His grandfather, Francis Frederick Giraud (1726–1811), was born of Waldensian Protestant refugee parents at Pinache in Würtemberg in 1726, and was brought to England by his uncle, the Rev. William Henry Giraud, vicar of Graveney, Kent, in 1736, entered at All Souls, Oxford, in 1744, was ordained in 1749, and was from 1762 to 1808 head-master of the Faversham grammar school. Herbert John Giraud was educated at the university of Edinburgh, where he graduated M.D. with honours in 1840. Entering the medical service of the East India Company in 1842, he became successively professor of chemistry and botany (in 1845) and principal of the Grant Medical College, Bombay; he was also chief medical officer of Sir Jamsetjee Jeejeebhoy's Hospital, chemical analyst to the Bombay government, surgeon-major and deputy-inspector-general of the Bombay army medical service, and dean of the faculty of medicine in Bombay University (1863). He died 12 January 1888 at Shanklin, Isle of Wight, where he had lived since his retirement in 1867. He married in 1842 Christina, daughter of Dr. David Shaw of the Bombay medical service, by whom he had two daughters, the elder of whom married Major-general Harpur of the Bombay staff corps. A list of ten botanical and chemical papers by Giraud is given in the Royal Society's ‘Catalogue of Scientific Papers,’ vol. ii. The most valuable of the botanical papers is on the embryo of Tropæolum, ‘Linnean Transactions,’ xix. 161. Several of the chemical papers relate to toxicology in India. Giraud was often consulted as an expert in medico-legal cases in the Bombay presidency.
