= Herbert Muirhead =

British soldier and footballer (1850–1904)

Col. Herbert Hugh Muirhead (10 December 1850 – 4 March 1904) was a British soldier, who played for the Royal Engineers in the 1872 FA Cup Final.

== Family ==
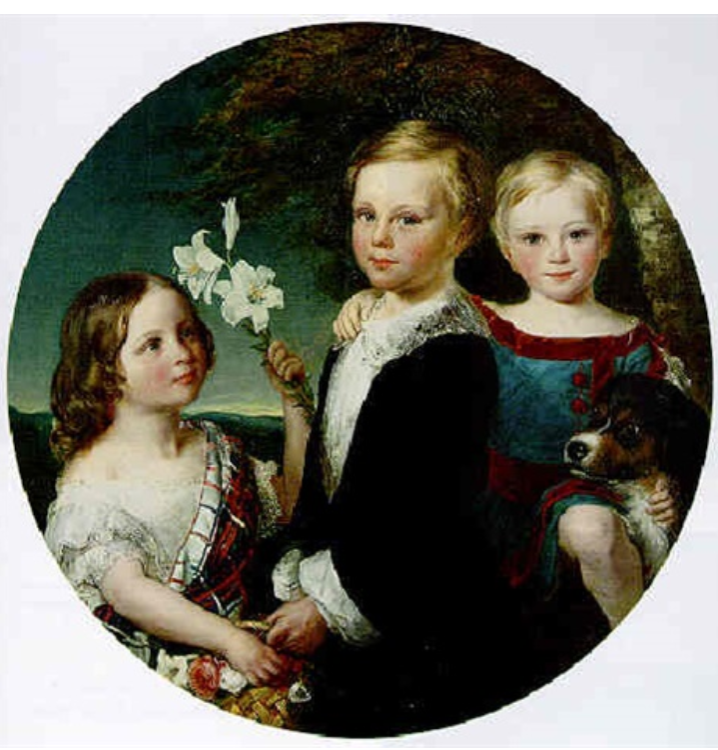
Francis Montagu Muirhead, Beatrix Marion Muirhead and Herbert (at right) with a dog in 1853

Muirhead was born at 3 Oriental Place, Brighton, the son of James Patrick Muirhead (1813–1898) and his wife Katharine Elizabeth née Boulton (1819–1890). His father was the biographer of James Watt, the engineer, and his mother was the granddaughter of Watt's partner, Matthew Boulton.

Muirhead's eldest brother was Lionel Boulton Campbell Lockhart Muirhead, who composed hymns, and whose son, Anthony, was MP for Wells in Somerset from 1929 to 1939.

Muirhead never married.

== Education ==
Muirhead was educated at Eton College from 1864 to 1867, before changing schools to Wellington, followed by the Royal Military Academy, Woolwich until 1871.

== Football career ==
Muirhead represented both his schools and the RMA at association football, before joining the Royal Engineers. Muirhead played as a forward and was "noticed for his excellent and fine runs".

In November 1871, the Royal Engineers were among fifteen teams who entered the inaugural FA Cup competition; after victories over Hitchin (5–0), Hampstead Heathens (3–0) and Crystal Palace (3–0 after a replay), the Engineers met Wanderers, the top amateur club of the day, in the first FA Cup Final, played at Kennington Oval on 16 March 1872, which the Engineers lost 1–0, to a goal from Morton Betts. In the final, Muirhead was involved in the only attack by the Engineers which succeeded in breaking through the Wanderers defence when, according to the match report in The Field, "a fine run by Lieut. Muirhead brought the ball within a few yards of the centre of the posts".

== Military career ==
Muirhead graduated from RMA Woolwich and joined the Royal Engineers as a lieutenant on 2 August 1871. Fellow graduates on the same day were two of his fellow FA Cup finalists, Alfred Goodwyn and Edmond Cotter, as well as Richard Ruck, who played in the 1875 FA Cup Final. Muirhead was promoted to captain twelve years later.

Muirhead received further promotions, to major on 17 December 1889 and to lieutenant-colonel on 4 April 1897, becoming a full colonel on 4 April 1901.

Between October 1871 and September 1873, Muirhead was based at Chatham, before spending two years in Ireland. In January 1876, Muirhead was posted to Bermuda until November 1878 before a transfer to Gibraltar, returning to England at the end of May 1881, where he was based at Aldershot. Between November 1881 and December 1883, he was based at The Curragh (Ireland), before taking up a post with the Royal Arsenal, Woolwich, where he served until July 1893, reaching the position of "Second Assistant, Building Works, Ordnance Factories".

Between August 1893 and September 1898, he was posted to Esquimalt on Canada's Pacific coast, where he was involved in West coast defence works. He spent the last five years in the Royal Engineers at Pembroke Dock in South Wales.

On 4 April 1902, Muirhead retired on £450 per annum retired pay.

== Death ==
Muirhead died at 32 Seymour Street, Marylebone on 4 March 1904 from pleuropneumonia, aged 53. He left an estate valued for probate at £19,001.

== Bibliography ==
- Collett, Mike (2003). The Complete Record of the FA Cup. Sports Books. ISBN 1-899807-19-5.
- Gibbons, Philip (2001). Association Football in Victorian England – A History of the Game from 1863 to 1900. Upfront Publishing. ISBN 1-84426-035-6.
- Warsop, Keith (2004). The Early F.A. Cup Finals and the Southern Amateurs. Soccer Data. ISBN 1-899468-78-1.

Muirhead and Boulton family tree

John Muirhead; 1685–1759	Margaret Syme; 1685–1753	John Muirhead; 1704–1755	Janet Bogle b. 1704
George Muirhead; 1715–1773	Patrick Muirhead; 1718–1807	Elizabeth Muirhead; 1728–1779	James Campbell	Marion Muirhead b. 1739	Matthew Boulton; 1728–1809	Anne Robinson; 1730–1783
Lockhart Muirhead; 1765–1829	Anna Campbell; 1769–1842	Mary Anne Wilkinson; 1796–1829	Matthew Robinson Boulton; 1770–1842	William Ralph Cartwright; 1771–1847
James Patrick Muirhead; 1813–1898	Katharine Boulton; 1819–1890	Matthew Piers Watt Boulton; 1820–1894	Frances Eliza Cartwright; 1817–1864
Herbert Hugh Muirhead; 1850–1904
