= James Patrick Muirhead =

Scottish advocate and author

James Patrick Muirhead FRSE (26 July 1813 – 15 October 1898) was a Scottish advocate and author, best known as the biographer of James Watt.

== Life ==
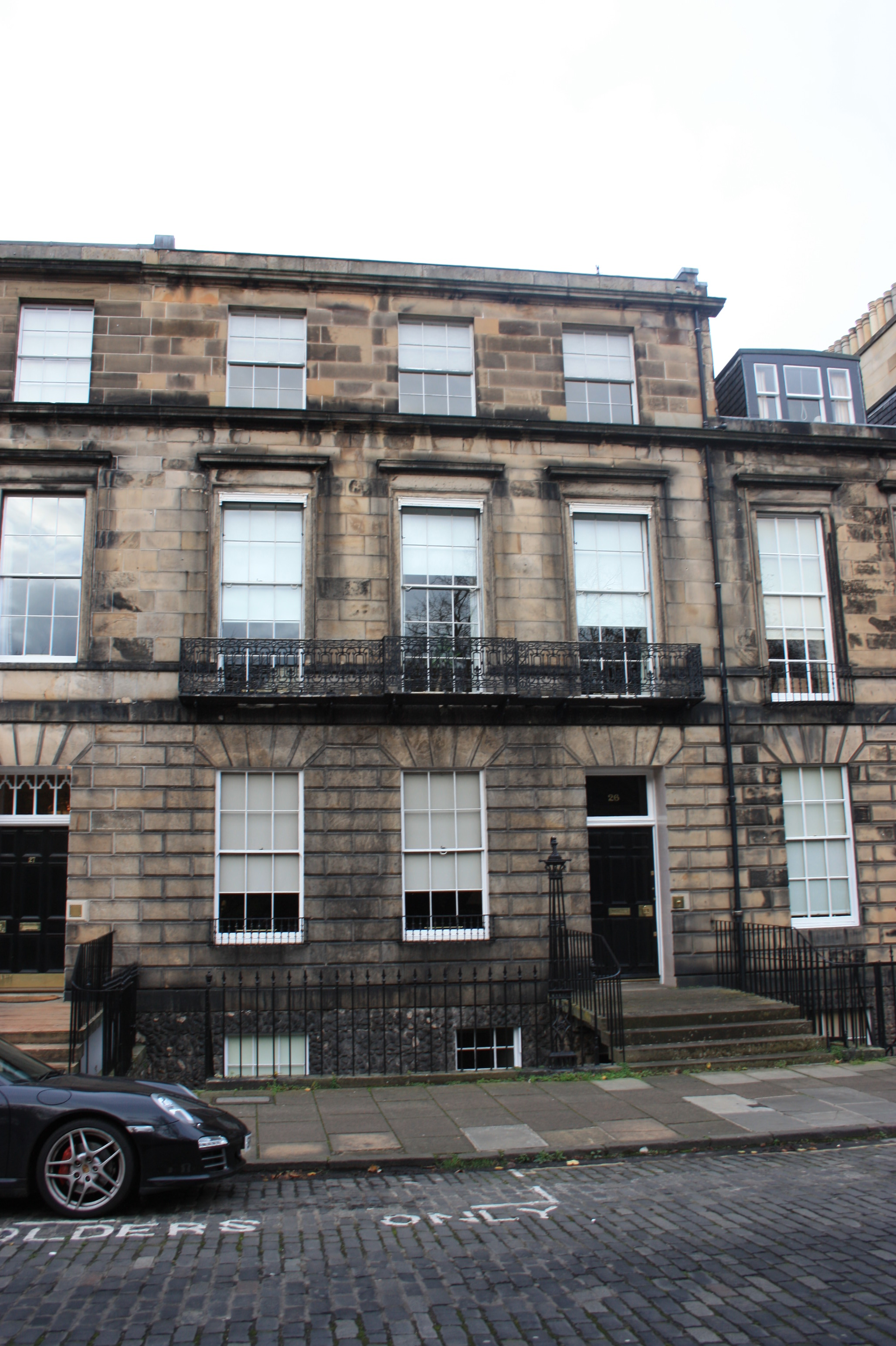
26 Heriot Row, Edinburgh

Born at The Grove, Hamilton, Lanarkshire, he was son of Lockhart Muirhead; George Muirhead was his great-uncle. He was educated first at Glasgow College. Gaining on 3 February 1832 a Snell exhibition at Balliol College, Oxford, he matriculated there on 6 April 1832; spending his long vacations in alpine expeditions, and in the study of German rather than in working for honours, he took a third class in lit. hum. on graduating B.A. in 1835 (M.A. 1838).

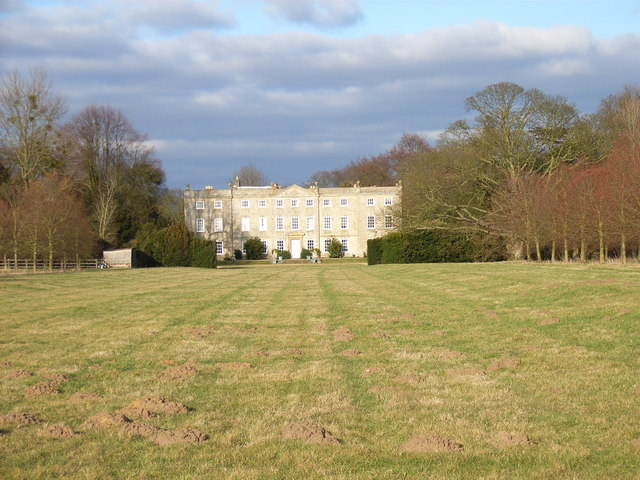
Haseley Court Little Haseley, Oxfordshire

Admitted advocate at Edinburgh in 1838, Muirhead practised law in Edinburgh. He lived with his family at 26 Heriot Row in Edinburgh's New Town.

He was elected a Fellow of the Royal Society of Edinburgh in 1841, his proposer being Sir John Robison.

His wife found the climate of Edinburgh too cold, and in 1846 he gave up his career at the Scottish bar, and in 1847 settled at Haseley Court, Oxfordshire, a property in his wife's family.

Muirhead died in his eighty-sixth year, on 15 October 1898.

== Works ==
While at Oxford, he had become acquainted with his kinsman James Watt the younger, who decided not to write a memoir of his father, and gave the task to Muirhead. In 1804 his grandfather, Patrick Muirhead of Glasgow University, married his cousin, Anne Campbell, whose mother (née Muirhead) was a first cousin of James Watt.

Muirhead in 1839 translated François Arago's Eloge Historique de James Watt for the Académie des Sciences, given in 1834. In the priority dispute of Watt with Henry Cavendish over the discovery of the chemical composition of water, he visited Paris in 1842 to confer with savants there, and in 1846 published a vindication of Watt, The Correspondence of the late James Watt on his Discovery of the Theory of the Composition of Water. This was followed in 1854 by The Mechanical Inventions of James Watt (3 vols.). The third volume, illustrated with engravings of machinery by Wilson Lowry, dealt with patent specifications; the second with extracts from correspondence. The introductory memoir (vol. i.) was the basis of the fuller Life of James Watt that Muirhead published in 1858 (2nd edit. 1859).

Other works were:

- Disputatio Juridica ad Lib. XII. Tit. ii. Digest = de Jurejurando sive voluntario sive necessario sive Judiciali (1838);
- Winged Words on Chantrey's Woodcocks (1857) a collection of epigrams (editor)
- The Vaux de Vire of Maistre Jean le Houx, Advocate, of Vire. Edited and translated into English Verse, with an Introduction (1875). On the purported poems of Olivier Basselin by Jean le Houx.

Between August 1882 and March 1891 Muirhead contributed to Blackwood's Magazine original poems and translations from English and old French poems, into Latin or English verse compositions as "J. P. M." He printed privately more of the same.

== Family ==
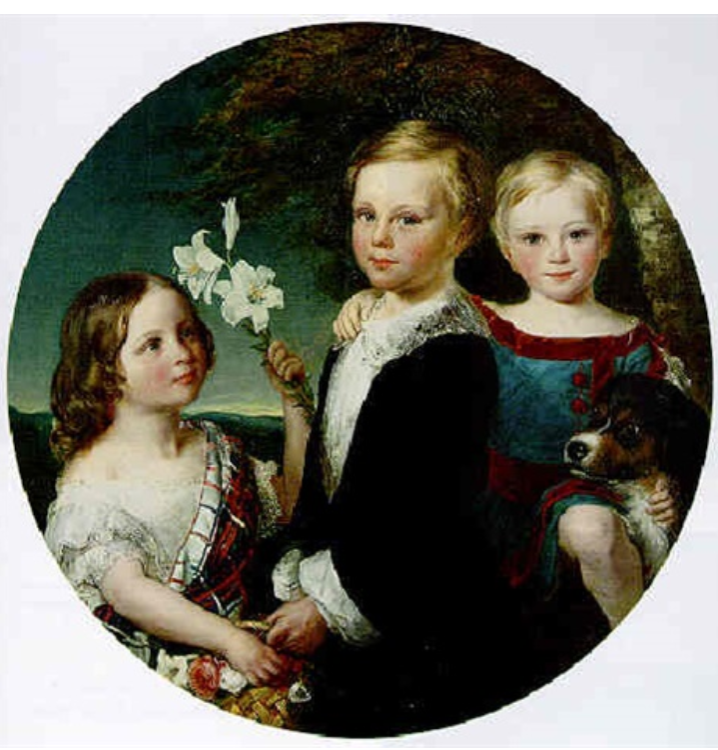
Francis Montagu Muirhead, Beatrix Marion Muirhead and Herbert Hugh Muirhead with a dog in 1853

In 1844 Muirhead married Katharine Elizabeth, second daughter of Matthew Robinson Boulton. She predeceased her husband in 1890. Six children survived them, the eldest son being Lionel Boulton Campbell Lockhart Muirhead, who composed hymns, and the third son Colonel Herbert Hugh Muirhead, R.E., who played for the Royal Engineers in the 1872 FA Cup Final. Their daughter Beatrix Marion (later Sturt) would write her father's biography, mentioning her brothers but not herself. Lionel's son, Anthony, was MP for Wells in Somerset from 1929 to 1939.

== Notes ==
Attribution

This article incorporates text from a publication now in the public domain: Lee, Sidney, ed. (1901). "Muirhead, James Patrick". Dictionary of National Biography (1st supplement). Vol. 3. London: Smith, Elder & Co.
