= Ethiopia–India relations =

- India: Ethiopia

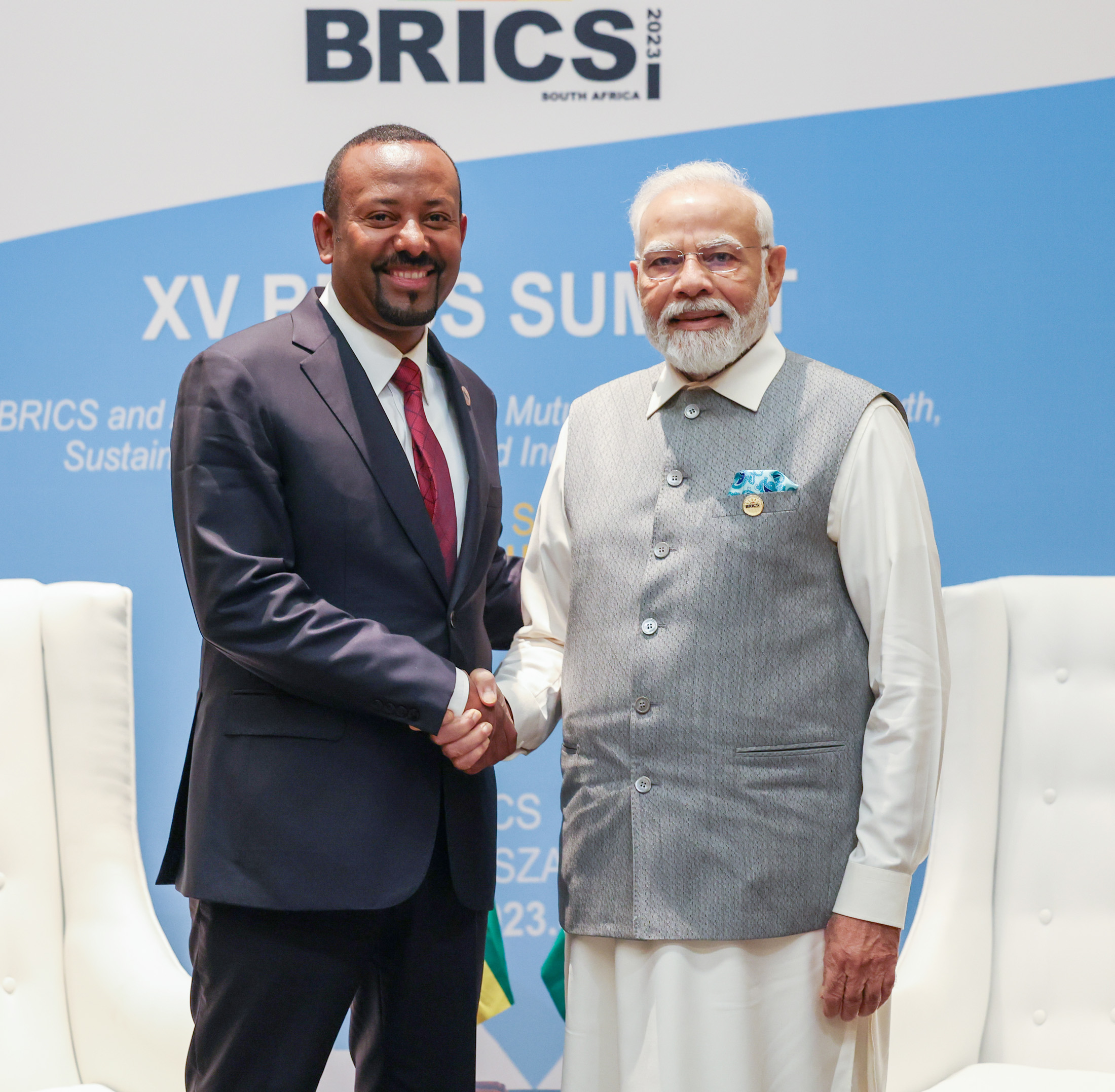
Ethiopian Prime Minister Ahmed with Indian Prime Minister Narendra Modi at the 15th BRICS summit in South Africa, 24 August 2023

Ethiopia–India relations have existed for almost two millennia. Modern diplomatic relations between India and Ethiopia were established at the level of legations in July 1948, after the independence of India. The relationship was raised to the ambassadorial level in 1952. India maintains an embassy in Addis Ababa and Ethiopia in New Delhi. The two countries have enjoyed close and friendly relations with India supporting Ethiopian developmental efforts while Ethiopia has supported Indian interests such as its claim to a permanent seat on the United Nations Security Council. India and Ethiopia share a common understanding on such issues as cross-border international terrorism, the need and direction for reform of the United Nations, and the importance of action on climate change.

== History ==
Trade and people-to-people contacts have existed between India and Ethiopia for almost two millennia, Hoard of Kushan period coins have been excavated from Debre Damo, northern Ethiopia. Beginning at the time of the Axumite Empire. Indians traded in silk, spices, gold and ivory with the Ethiopians in the 6th century. Portuguese assistance to the King of Ethiopia in the 16th century saw the arrival of people from Goa in Ethiopia. British interventions in Ethiopia in 1868 to free European diplomats imprisoned by Emperor Tewodros II under General Robert Napier and in 1941 that ended the Italian occupation both involved large contingents of Indian soldiers who fought as part of the British commanded forces.

Ethiopia has also been home to a sizable Indian diaspora consisting of traders and artisans who settled down there in the latter half of the nineteenth century. During Emperor Haile Selassie's reign a large number of Indian teachers went to Ethiopia which has led to the development of significant goodwill towards India among the Ethiopians. The Siddi community on India's western coast are thought to be of Ethiopian descent. The Ethiopian-born Malik Ambar ruled the Ahmadnagar Sultanate in the Deccan region of India in the 17th century and is a figure of veneration to the Siddis of Gujarat.

== Political ties ==
During the Italian invasion of Ethiopia, Jawaharlal Nehru made a stirring call for solidarity with Abyssinia, noting that "We in India can do nothing to help our brethren in distress in Ethiopia for we are also victims of imperialism but we stand with them today in their sorrow as we hope to stand together when better days come". Upon India's independence in 1947, it sent a goodwill mission to Ethiopia and diplomatic relations were established the following year. In 1950, the countries formalised their diplomatic ties and Sardar Sant Singh was appointed India's first Ambassador to Ethiopia. The two countries have since exchanged several visits at the level of Heads of State with Emperor Haile Selassie, Col. Mengistu Haile Mariam and former Prime Minister Meles Zenawi paying state visits to India. Presidents S. Radhakrishnan and V V Giri, Vice President Zakir Husain and former Prime Minister Manmohan Singh have led Indian state visits to Ethiopia.

Ethiopia's ties with India were especially strong under Prime Minister Meles Zenawi who was supportive of India seeing India's growth as beneficial to Ethiopia's own economic growth. Ethiopia's former Prime Minister Hailemariam Desalegn and the country's first lady have both been educated in India. The second India-Africa Forum Summit was held at Addis Ababa in May 2011 which was attended by as many as 15 Heads of States of various African nations. This was also the first time India was hosting such an event abroad.

== Economic relations ==
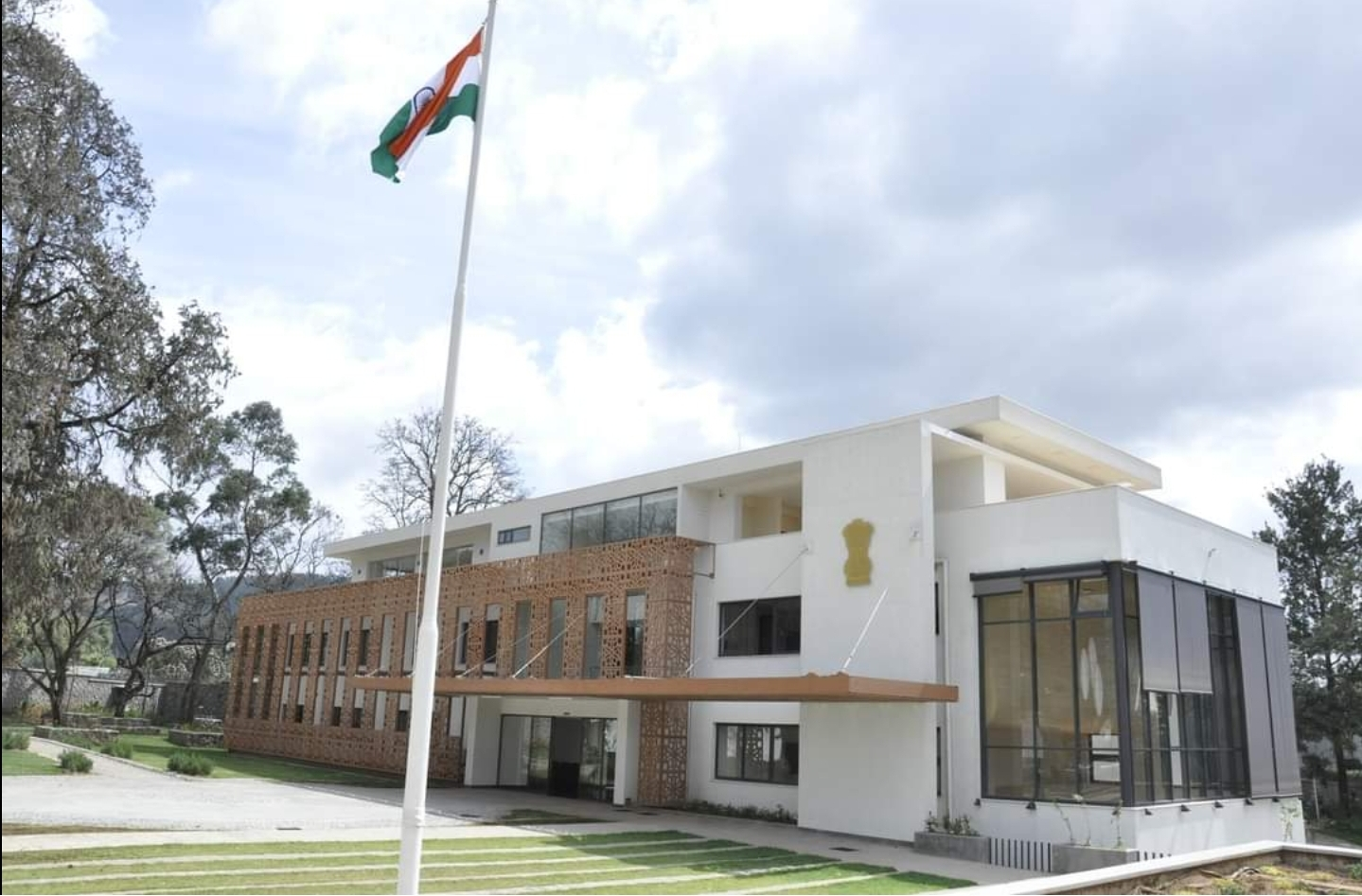
Embassy of India in Addis Ababa

=== Bilateral trade and investment ===
India's Exports to Ethiopia were US$723.45 Million in 2021, according to the United Nations COMTRADE database on international trade. Trade between the two countries amounted to $660 million in 2011-'12 and was expected to reach $1 billion by 2015. Indian exports to Ethiopia consists of drugs and pharmaceuticals, steel, machinery, food items, plastic and linoleum products, paper, textiles, chemicals, transport equipment and steel. India's imports from Ethiopia include raw hides and skins, pulses, oil seeds, spices, leather and scrap metal.

India is Ethiopia's second largest source of Foreign Direct Investments with investments amounting to $5 billion. Indian investments in Ethiopia are expected to be worth $10 billion by 2015 with India approving investments worth $4.78 billion in 2011.

=== Economic cooperation ===
India and Ethiopia signed a Bilateral Investment Promotion and Protection Agreement in 2007 and a Double Taxation Avoidance Agreement in 2011 to promote mutual trade and investments. At the Second India Africa Forum Summit, the then Indian Prime Minister Manmohan Singh announced a $300 million line of credit to help revive the Ethiopia-Djibouti rail route. This project however went to Chinese construction companies following delays on the Indian side in sanctioning the funds. The Duty Free Tariff Preference scheme that was announced at the summit allowing for imports from Least developed Countries into India has however had a positive impact on bilateral trade with the value of Ethiopian exports to India now reaching $120 million. The balance of trade however remains in India's favour. India has also extended $710 million in lines of credit to help in rural electrification and the revival of the sugar industry in Ethiopia.

On 22 May 2026, India and Ethiopia signed a bilateral accession protocol in Geneva supporting Ethiopia's entry into the World Trade Organization (WTO), reaffirming India's support for developing countries' integration into the multilateral trading system. Bilateral relations had been elevated to a Strategic Partnership during Prime Minister Narendra Modi's visit to Ethiopia in December 2025.

== Technical cooperation ==
India has agreed to cooperate with Ethiopia in the agricultural sector for the development of the meat and dairy sectors. To build human resource capacity, India trains Ethiopian diplomats and trade negotiators under its Indian Technical and Economic Cooperation Programme. The Indian Army is involved in training and developing a manual for the Ethiopian Army. The Pan-African e-Network project that India has undertaken to link African nations with each other and to India was launched on a pilot basis first in Ethiopia in 2007.
