= Mumbiram =

Indian painter and author (born c.1949)

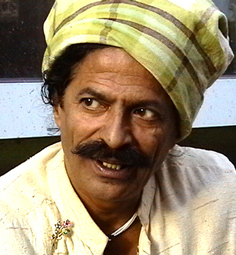
- Mumbiram, leader of the Rasa Renaissance movement of aesthetics
- Born: c. 1949 (age c. 76); Pune, Maharashtra, India
- Known for: Artist (charcoal, paint), author, translator of Sanskrit literature
- Notable work: Prema Vivarta ("Deluges of Ecstasy"), High Five of Love
- Movement: Rasa Renaissance
- Spouse(s): Nadine, alias Vrinda (m. 2002)
- Children: 2
- Website: www.mumbiram.com

Dhananjay Paranjpe (born c. 1949), (Note: The 25 June 2009 article "Artist married to German moves HC for child's school admission" lists Mumbiram's age as sixty at the time. This puts his approximate birth year at 1949 and age at around 76 (in 2025).) known as Mumbiram, is an Indian painter and author known for his association with the Rasa Renaissance art movement. He is best recognized for his renderings depicting India’s rural and tribal communities in everyday life made in colour or with charcoal. Mumbiram is also noted for his poetic-philosophical work, "Deluges of Ecstasy" which was composed during his 12-year stay in the United States and explores themes of prema vivarta, or the transformations of divine love.

== Early life ==
Mumbiram was born in downtown Pune, Maharashtra. His mother, Anjani, was the daughter of S. H. Godbole, a watercolor artist who served as a secretary of the Bombay Art Society in the 1930s. Anjani was also the granddaughter of Shri Vartak, the first Indian Chief Engineer of the colonial Bombay Presidency.

As a child, Mumbiram won prizes in children's art competitions. As a teenager, he was attracted to mathematics and science and received his bachelor's degree in Telecommunication Engineering in 1967. Mumbiram attended the University of California, where he got his M.S. in Mathematical Systems in 1968 and a Ph.D. in 1973 for a dissertation in Mathematical Economics.

== Time in America ==
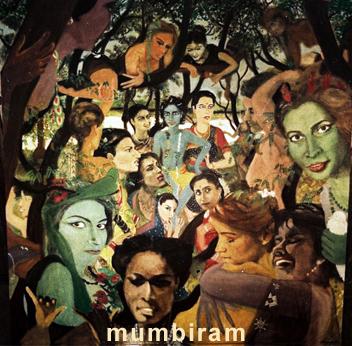
Rasa Renaissance Masterpiece Forest Women visit Krishna and the Gopis. Oil on canvas, by Mumbiram, 1985

Mumbiram traveled in America for six more years, with significant periods spent in the Capitol Hill neighborhood in Seattle, in Potomac, Maryland, and in Cambridge at Boston University. He developed a hands-on approach to painting, with charcoal and ink-and-brush as his forte. Much of his work from these years remains with unknown individuals.

The two works, Alice Cooper Washing Mumbiram's Hair and Red-Haired Amateur Palmist Girl Reading Krishna's Fortune near Govardhan, represent his work in this period. His poetic work "Prema Vivarta" or "Deluges of Ecstasy" was composed during this period. In this work, the prema vivarta mood is revealed as the art of reconciling the mundane and the transcendental on the path to self-realization. All five of these literary works comprise the ensemble High Five of Love and are lavishly illustrated with Mumbiram's art, inspired by the same ideals.

== The Gokula painting ==
Mumbiram's search for classical Sanskrit literature brought him to Krishna's Vrindavan in the summer of 1987. There he met Sachiko Konno (also known by her spiritual name, Gokula), a student from the Tokyo College of Design who came to Vrindavan in search of an aesthetic ideal. Their friendship brought Mumbiram to Japan a few months later. Mumbiram made several oil paintings on canvas during his stay, renderings of a sari-clad young Japanese woman in love with India. Gokula is said to have modeled for these paintings. These paintings depict elements from two cultural traditions.

== High Five of Love (1995–2005) ==
Before his landmark house was torn down in 2005, Mumbiram completed translating the four great Rasa (transl. ‘emotional fulfillment’ or ‘nectar’) classics into English, which he began in 1987. Vyasa's "Rasa Panchadhyayi", Jayadeva's "Gita Govinda", and Vishvanath Chakravarty’s "Prema Samput" appear as "Five Songs of Rasa", "Conjugal Fountainhead", and "Jewel-Box of Highest Secrets of True Love", respectively. A folk version in Vraja Bhasha of Rupa Gosvami's "Lalit Madhava" is rendered as "Vrindavan Diaries". Mumbiram's English translations of Eastern classics are comparable in scope to Edward FitzGerald’s translation "Rubaiyat of Omar Khayyam", Richard Francis Burton's "Arabian Nights", or Edwin Arnold’s "The Light of Asia". Mumbiram's fifth original work, "Deluges of Ecstasy", was written in the prema vivarta mood of Love in Separation that he had composed in America. These are published as a five-volume ensemble, High Five of Love, by Distant Drummer Publishing of Germany, reminiscent of works by William Blake and Khalil Gibran.

== Prema vivarta mood ==
According to Vaishnavism theology, Krishna is 'Rasaraj', the supreme source of all rasas; depictions of incidents in Krishna's biography are subjects for Rasa Art.

In the prema vivarta mood of attachment to Krishna, everything appears to the lover of Krishna as a déjà vu related to Krishna. Many pieces of art by Mumbiram are made in the prema vivarta mood. The theme of these renderings is from adolescent Krishna's activities, enacted by forest tribals and urban rag-pickers.

The charcoal renderings "Encounter on the Way back from the Forest" and "I let him persuade me" are examples of this theme. These renderings show how enlightenment and aesthetics are intertwined in the Rasa masterpieces of Mumbiram. Sudhir Sonalkar's article "Banishing tourist-type Visions" notes this aspect of Mumbiram's art.

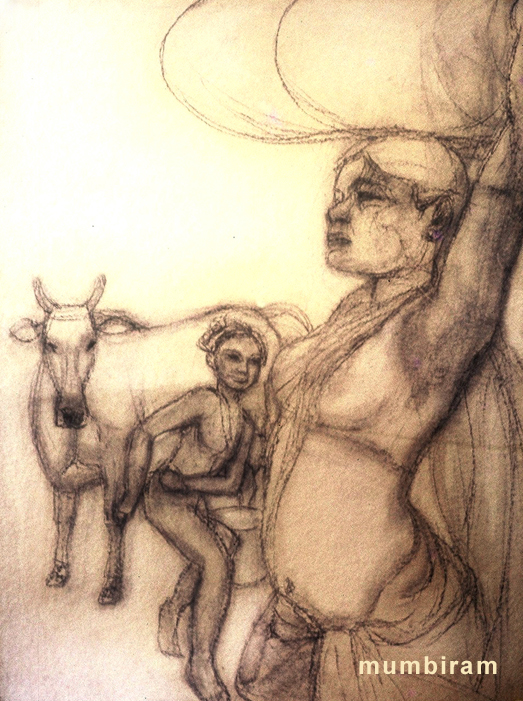
Encounter on the Way back from the Forest; Mumbiram, Charcoal, 1985, Pune

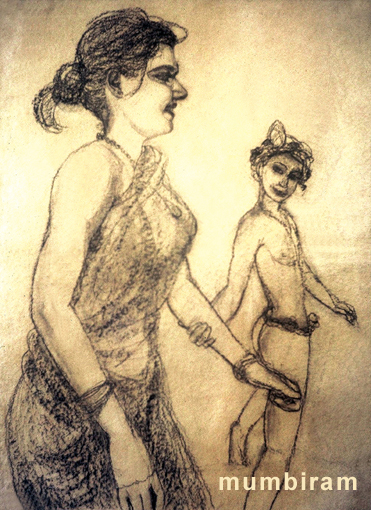
I let him persuade me; Mumbiram, Charcoal, 1986, Pune
