= John Peet (surgeon) =

British surgeon, anatomist

John Peet (28 October 1818 – 18 January 1874) was a British surgeon who worked in India in the Bombay Medical Service and served as the first professor of anatomy and surgery at the Grant Medical College. He published one of the first textbooks on medicine for Indian students which was also translated into Indian languages.

Peet studied medicine at the Colonial Hospital in Hobert Town, Tasmania, under James Scott (1790–1837) and E.S.P. Bedford and qualified as a doctor in 1841 and became a ship surgeon on the Bussorah Merchant. He joined the service of the East India Company Bombay Medical Service on 2 May 1842. Peet served with the Indian Navy aboard HMS Nemesis and was with Charles Napier's expedition to Sind. His early posting was in Sind and in 1845 he became a professor of anatomy at the Grant Medical College while working also at the Jamsetji Jijibhai Hospital. He was also deputed as an inspector of education in Bombay from 1856 to 1861. He qualified as surgeon from Aberdeen in 1860. After the retirement of Charles Morehead, he became the principal of the Grant Medical College. He retired in 1867 and returned to England.

Peet died at Shanklin.
