= George Muirhead =

George Muirhead may refer to:

- George Muirhead (linguist)
- George Muirhead (minister)
- George Muirhead (naturalist)
- George Muirhead, Australian farmer, see Principality of Marlborough
