= Robert Morehead =

Scottish clergyman and poet

Robert Morehead FRSE (9 March 1777 – 13 December 1842) was a Scottish clergyman and poet who served as Dean of Edinburgh from 1818 to 1832.

== Life ==
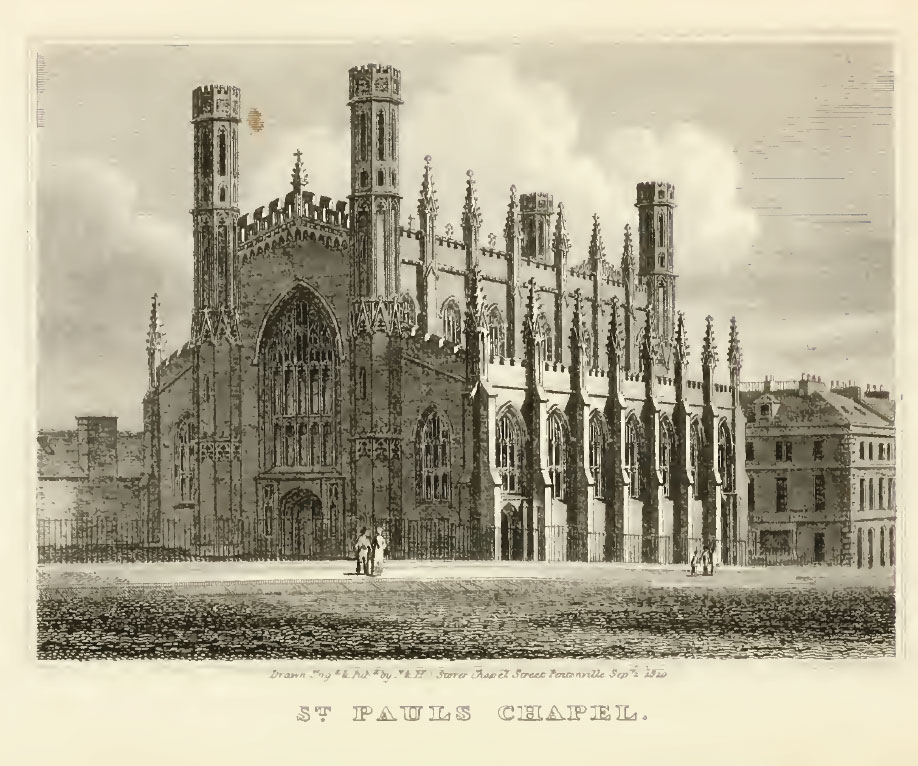
St Paul's Chapel on York Place (opened 1818)

Morehead was born on 9 March 1777 near Stirling in central Scotland, the son of Isabella Lockhart and William Morehead FRSE (1737–1793).

He studied divinity at Balliol College, Oxford, and was ordained in 1802. He held incumbencies at the Qualified Chapel in Leith, and in 1806 moved to the Cowgate Chapel in Edinburgh In 1818 he became incumbent at the newly built St Paul's Chapel on York Place in the Edinburgh's New Town, serving alongside Rev Archibald Alison. He was also dean of the city. In 1832 he left Edinburgh to be rector of Easington in Yorkshire.

In 1810 he lived at 1 Hill Street. In the 1830s he is listed as living at 26 Hill Street in the centre of Edinburgh's New Town. The building was demolished to create a small car park.

In 1817 he was elected a Fellow of the Royal Society of Edinburgh. His proposers were Sir George Steuart Mackenzie, Archibald Alison and Henry Mackenzie. He resigned from the Society in 1837.

He died on 13 December 1842.

== Family ==
He was married to Margaret Wilson. Their children included William Ambrose Morehead and Charles Morehead FRSE (1807–1882) an authority on tropical diseases.

== Publications ==
see

Morehead was a frequent contributor to the Edinburgh Review.

- An Essay on the Nature and Principles of Taste

Anglican Communion titles
Preceded by James Walker	Dean of Edinburgh; 1818 – 1832	Succeeded by Charles Hughes Terrot
