= Vimla Virmani =

Indian neurologist

- Vimla Virmani, from a 1999 obituary notice.
- Born: 12 April 1919; Lyallpur (now Faisalabad)
- Died: November 1999
- Other names: Vimala Virmani
- Occupation: Neurologist

Vimla Virmani (12 April 1919 – November 1999), also seen as Vimala Virmani, was an Indian neurologist. In 1978, she became the first woman to serve as president of the Neurological Society of India.

== Early life ==
Virmani was born in Lyallpur (now Faisalabad, Pakistan), the daughter of Hakim Rai. She was educated at home. She earned a master's degree in psychology by taking classes informally at the Forman Christian College in Lahore. She attended Khalsa College in Amritsar and earned a medical degree at Grant Medical College. She pursued further studies on a year's fellowship in London in 1961 and 1962.

== Career ==
Virmani was a researcher with the Indian Council of Medical Research, and practiced as a neurologist at Lady Hardinge Medical College and Hospital. She was a professor of neurology at All India Institute of Medical Sciences (AIIMS) from 1964, and head of the neurology department from 1975 to 1979. She was a visiting professor of neurology at the Neurological Institute in Montreal in 1969 and 1970, at Banaras Hindu University in 1973, and at Sree Chitra Tirunal Institute for Medical Sciences and Technology (SCTIMST) in 1979. Her research ranged widely in subjects, but often involved neuromuscular dysfunction and spinal muscular atrophy.

In 1978, Virmani became the first woman to serve as president of the Neurological Society of India. She was a founding member of the Delhi Neurological Group, a precursor of the Delhi Neurological Association. In 1975, she attended the Asian and Oceanian Congress of Neurology in Bangkok, and was national advisor to the WHO/IAMS Seminar on Epilepsy in Bangalore. She was named a fellow of the Royal College of Physicians of Edinburgh in 1976.

== Personal life ==
Virmani died in 1999, aged 80 years. The Vimla Virmani Award is a bronze medal and a cash prize given annually by the National Academy of Medical Sciences "for outstanding work in the field of physical and/or psychosociological rehabilitation of neurologically and/or mentally afflicted subjects". Among the recipients of the Vimla Virmani Award have been M. V. Padma Srivastava and Manas Kumar Mandal.
