= Moorhead (surname) =

Moorhead is a surname. Notable people with the surname include:

- Agnes Moorehead (1900–1974), American actress
- Bob Moorhead (1938–1986), American baseball player
- Carlos Moorhead (1922–2011), American politician
- Don Moorhead (born 1948), American football player
- Ethel Moorhead (1869–1955), British suffragette and painter
- Evan Moorhead (born 1978), Australian politician
- Frederick Moorhead (1863–1902), Australian politician and judge
- George Moorhead (1895–1976), Northern Ireland footballer
- James K. Moorhead (1806–1884), American politician
- Jean Moorhead, American actress and model
- Jennelle V. Moorhead (1903–1999), American educator
- Joe Moorhead, American football player and coach
- John Moorhead (historian), Australian historian and academic
- Lorna Jean Moorhead, American writer
- Natalie Moorhead (1901–1992), American actress
- Scipio Moorhead, American artist
- William Moorhead (1882–1962), Canadian Anglican bishop
- William S. Moorhead (1923–1987), American politician
