= Laxman Vasudev Paranjape =

Leader of the Indian RSS (1877–1958)

Acting Sarsanghchalak of the Rashtriya Swayamsevak Sangh
- In office c. 1930–c. 1931
- Preceded by: K. B. Hedgewar
- Succeeded by: K. B. Hedgewar

Personal details
- Born: Laxman Vasudev Paranjape; 20 November 1877 Nagpur, Central Provinces and Berar, British India (present day Maharashtra, India)
- Died: 22 February 1958 (aged 80) Nagpur, Bombay State (present day Maharashtra), India
- Education: Bachelor of Medicine, Bachelor of Surgery
- Alma mater: Grant Medical College
- Occupation: Physician; Political activist
- Known for: Sarsanghachalak of Rashtriya Swayamsevak Sangh
- Nickname(s): Doctor, Dada (by family and friends)

Laxman Vasudev Paranjape, was a founding member of the Rashtriya Swayamsevak Sangh (RSS), a right-wing Hindutva paramilitary organisation. Paranjape also served as the acting Sarsanghchalak of the RSS, when Hedgewar went to jail during the Forest Satyagraha of 1930s.

== Early life ==
The family of Paranjape belonged to the small place called Wada in Konkan. He was born on 20 November 1877 in Nagpur. He did his schooling in Wardha till 9th and later moved to Nagpur. He completed his schooling from Neel City High School and got a medical degree from Grant Medical College, Mumbai. He started serving in Nagpur from 1904 after his graduation.

Dr. Paranjape was married to Umabai. His daughter Pramila-tai Munje (1914-2004), was an active member with Rashtra Sevika Samiti, the women's wing of RSS, which shares its initials.

== Career ==
In the 1920 session of the Indian National Congress held in Nagpur, which was the biggest conference ever then, a total number of 14583 delegates were present. A volunteer organisation called Bharat Swayamsewak Mandal was formed by Paranjape and Hedgewar, had undertaken the arrangements of the conference. All the volunteers were asked to wear a uniform, which was later adopted by the RSS as its own official uniform from 1925 to 1940. He was instrumental in increasing RSS branches during his tenure.
