= S. H. Godbole =

Indian artist (1885–1972)

Shankar Hari Godbole
- Born: 1885
- Died: 1972 (aged 86–87)
- Known for: Painting, Watercolor
- Relatives: Mumbiram (grandson)

Shankar Hari Godbole (1885–1972) was an Indian artist who worked in various art forms, including watercolor, portraiture, and landscape painting. He was well known for painting scenes of rural India. As the secretary of the Pune branch of the Bombay Art Society, he organised the annual Monsoon Art Exhibitions in Pune. His art was collected by English civil servants and army officers at the time of the British Raj.

== Personal life and education ==
Godbole was born in Wai (Now in Maharashtra State) in 1885, an important religious centre situated on the banks of the Krishna River. Godbole's ancestors worked in traditional priestly occupations and were well-versed in the Vedas. His father, Hari Ganesh Godbole, authored the scholarly works 'Aatmavidyaa' and 'Jeevitavidyaa'. He received education in the British colonial system and became the headmaster of government high schools in Pune and Nashik. As a teenager, Godbole married Varanasi Vartak, the eldest daughter of Vishnu Vartak, chief engineer of the Bombay Presidency. They had four daughters. Varanasi died of tuberculosis around 1935. Godbole married a second time around 1940 to a widow, introduced to him by social reformer Dhondo Keshav Karve. They had one son.

== Careers ==
=== Art teacher at St. Vincent High School and secretary at the Bombay Art Society of Pune ===
Godbole joined Mumbai's Sir Jamsetjee Jeejeebhoy School of Art around 1910, against his parents' wishes. There, he befriended Narayan Eranna Puram, and they became lifelong friends. Both dropped out of the J.J. School to follow independent paths. Godbole became a teacher at St. Vincent's High School in Pune's army cantonment area. His watercolour paintings were appreciated by the English and Parsee communities of Pune. In the 1930s, Godbole became the secretary of the Pune branch of the Bombay Art Society. In this role, he organized the annual Monsoon exhibitions of the Bombay Art Society under the patronage of the governor of the Bombay Presidency. The governor was consistently the chief guest at the opening ceremony of the exhibition. Godbole never entered his own works in these exhibitions.

=== Institute of Modern Art ===
In the 1930s, Puram and Godbole founded the “Institute of Modern Art” in Pune. This institution later evolved into Puram’s Bharatiya Kala Prasarini Sabha, the parent organization of Abhinav Kala Vidyalaya, Pune’s first art and architecture college. Godbole’s son-in-law, Ramdas Paranjpe, served on the Sabha’s executive committee for many years and, together with Sayajirao Silam, contributed to its fundraising efforts. Paranjpe, who held Godbole and his work in high regard, later became president of the Bharatiya Kala Prasarini Sabha in the 1960s.

=== Early works ===
The painting "Young Men with Ganesha on Ocean Beach" depicts an idealized Ganapati Visarjan procession, one of several renditions on this theme Godbole created in the 1930s. This portrayal differs from historical processions known in Pune or Mumbai. The work does not emphasize anatomical accuracy or technical virtuosity; instead, the artist conveys a vision of an intimate emotional experience. The painting is reminiscent of early Bengal School of Art works by artists such as Kshitindranath Majumdar, Jamini Roy, and some early pieces by Rabindranath Tagore. Another notable feature of this painting is the androgynous quality exuded by the figures of the Ganesha devotees.

=== Interpretation of mythological themes ===
In the 1930s, Godbole experimented with fusing Indian mythological themes with a Western classical painting style. During this period, his friend Puram was creating illustrations for the Mahabharata edition produced by the Bhandarkar Oriental Research Institute of Pune. A surviving example from that time is "Ravana's encounter with Sita in Panchavati". Godbole's depiction of Ravana's encounter with Sita diverges from traditional understandings of that meeting. Ravana is shown approaching Sita not as a respected sanyasi or a fearful demon with a thin disguise, but as a youthful, courteous wanderer of the forest. The depiction suggests Ravana's acute understanding of the mental state of an overprotected young woman approached by an exotic stranger with unclear intentions. This portrayal suggests Ravana lured Sita to cross the Laxmana Rekha rather than resorting to blackmail. Godbole's unique interpretation depicts Ravana as a youthful figure and Sita as a naive young woman. This is an unusual portrayal of Sita, who is typically shown as a revered demi-goddess in many other depictions. This interpretation reflects a nuanced understanding of Ravana's cleverness and Sita's human sentiments, which disrupted their idyllic life in Panchavati.

=== Watercolor ===
Mumbiram described Godbole's watercolor treatment: "Highlights and bright areas are created by leaving the paper white or letting it shine through, rather than by adding white pigment to the colors. The artist has to have a good judgment of the light effects before dipping the brush in the colors." The painting "Midday Feast for the Village Deity in the Forest" is a rendering made around 1950. Most of Godbole's landscapes are contextualized by the people who populate them. The still life painting “Antique Japanese Vase" was produced by Godbole around 1950. By this time, he had no formal connection with the Bombay Art Society, which he had once led as secretary under the patronage of the governor of the Bombay Presidency. Indian artists were increasingly influenced by Western art movements of the first half of the 20th century, in a shift towards modernity. Godbole, aged 65, was no longer formally associated with art societies, allowing him artistic independence with his favored medium: watercolor.

=== Post-retirement ===
After his retirement around 1942, Godbole established his art studio in a farmhouse on the outskirts of Pune, along the Pune-Mumbai road. His grandson, Mumbiram, described the atmosphere that prevailed in that studio. Mumbiram credits Godbole for his early influences and training. Godbole was known for painting Indian rural scenes, with bullock carts being a recurring theme in his works of the 1940s. A painting from this period is "Bullock Cart Caravan returning home at sundown", created while he resided at his farmhouse. Godbole developed an impressionistic approach, creating impressions through distinct brushwork.

== Last years ==
Much of Godbole's work was damaged during the floods that inundated Pune when the Panshet and Khadakwasla Dams broke in July 1961. His daughter Anjani and grandson Mumbiram salvaged and restored some of his works. In the second half of the 20th century, Indian art came under the Western influence of abstraction and distortion, led by the Bombay Progressive Artists' Group. Classical art's prominence diminished. Godbole's final years were spent in indebtedness, and he was forced to sell his farmhouse. He died in 1972 with diminished recognition within the art world.

Godbole is the maternal grandfather of the artist Mumbiram.
