= V. V. Paranjpe =

Indian diplomat

Indian ambassador to China
- In office 1955–1957
- Preceded by: Ratan Kumar Nehru
- Succeeded by: Gopalapuram Parthasarathy (1912–1995)

Indian ambassador to Ethiopia
- In office 1974–1976
- Preceded by: O. V. Alagesan; Kailas Chandra Sen Gupta
- Succeeded by: es:Prem Kumar Budhwar

Indian ambassador to South Korea
- In office February 6, 1978 – August 23, 1983
- Preceded by: Aga S. Muzaffar
- Succeeded by: Arundhati Ghose

Personal details
- Born: Vasant V. Paranjpe
- Died: April 8, 2010 Pune
- Occupation: Diplomat

Vasant Vasudeo Paranjpe was an Indian diplomat and an expert on China. In 1947, he came to China to study the Chinese language at Beijing University. He later worked in China, until 1957. He served as the interpreter when Nehru visited China and served as the interpreter between the Indian and Chinese delegations, translating directly between Jawaharlal Nehru and Mao Zedong in 1954. From 1974 to 1976, he was the ambassador of Addis Ababa. In 1977, he was made India's ambassador to South Korea. Presented credentials on February 6, 1978 in Seoul.

In his later years, he recalled the difficulties of his job as an interpreter during Nehru's visit to China, as the Chinese language was complex and Mao had a very strong regional accent. In one incident, he recalled, at a musical evening in honor of Nehru in Shanghai conducted by its mayor, the announcer introduced a musician using the Chinese pronoun “ta” (he/she/it). Paranjpe translated it as “he,” but when a woman appeared after the curtains were raised, Nehru angrily rebuked him for his mistake, questioning him if he knew Chinese well enough.

== See also ==
- Sino-Indian relations
