= Lockhart Muirhead =

Scottish librarian, museum-keeper and academic

Lockhart Muirhead (1765–1829) was a Scottish librarian, museum-keeper and academic. He was Regius Professor of Zoology at Glasgow University, from 1807.

== Life ==
Muirhead travelled in Europe shortly before the French Revolution, and subsequently wrote on both French and Italian topics. He contributed to the Monthly Review and Edinburgh Review. He was librarian of Glasgow University in the period 1795 to 1823.

Muirhead became Keeper of the Hunterian Museum in Glasgow. William Hunter had intended his collection to go to Glasgow, when he died in 1783. It was Muirhead who in 1807 went to London to see to the move of the temporary display, to Glasgow University.

== Family ==
Muirhead married Anne Campbell. The biographer James Patrick Muirhead was their son.
