= Charles Morehead (physician) =

Scottish physician

Charles Morehead CIE FRSE
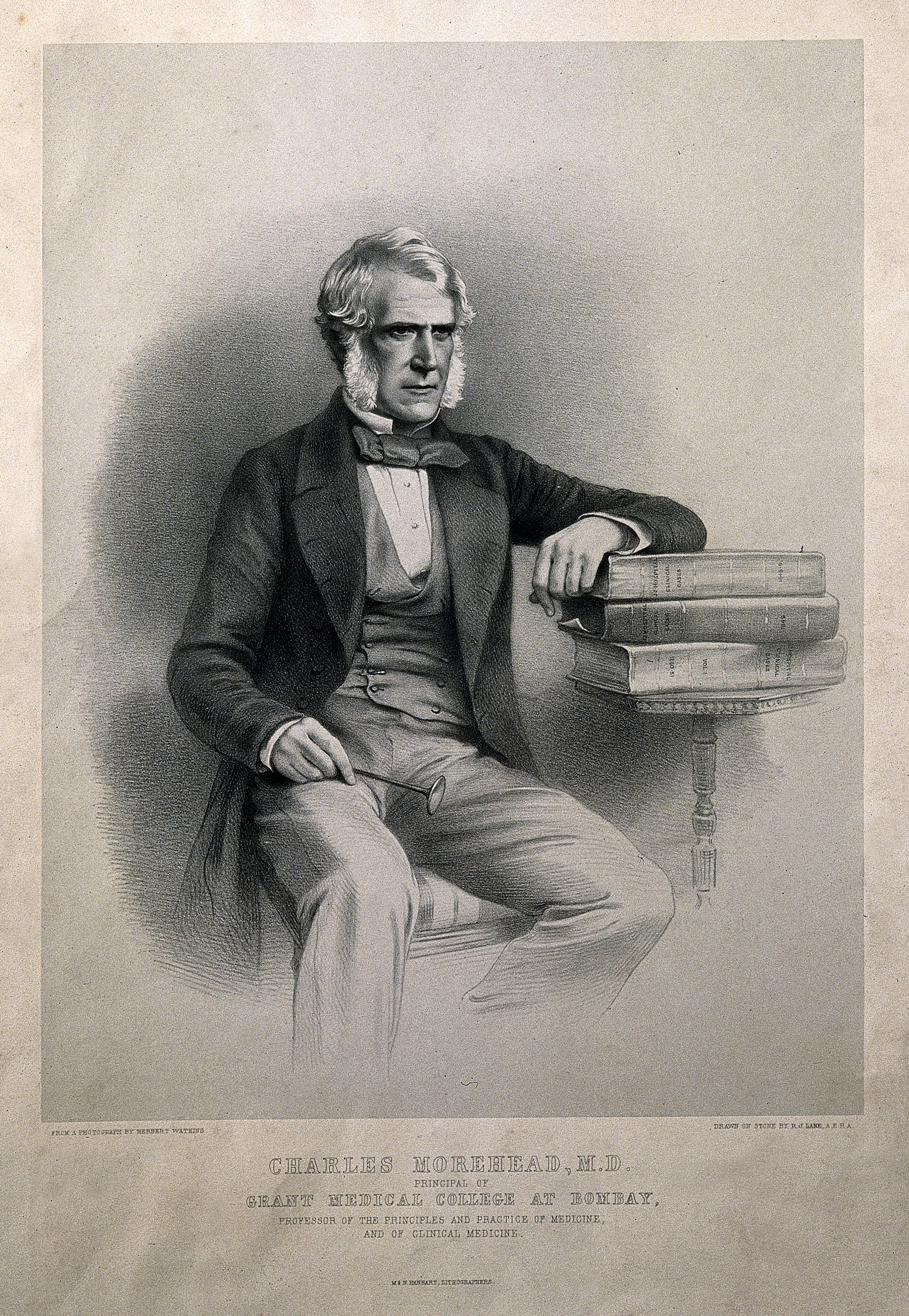
- Born: 8 February 1807
- Died: 24 August 1882 (aged 75)
- Education: University of Edinburgh
- Medical career
- Institutions: Grant Medical College; Indian Medical Service
- Notable works: Researches into the Diseases of India

Charles Morehead CIE FRSE (8 February 1807 – 24 August 1882) was a 19th-century Scottish physician who rose to eminence in the Indian Medical Service for his contribution to medical education. He was the founding principal of the Grant Medical College in Bombay in 1845.

== Life ==
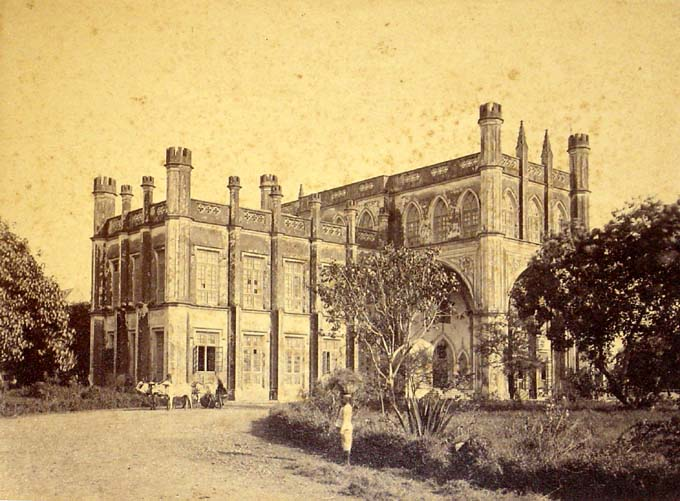
Grant Medical College building in 1860

Morehead was born in Edinburgh to Margaret (daughter of Charles Wilson, Professor of Church History at the University of St. Andrews) and Rev. Dr Robert Morehead DD. He was younger brother to William Ambrose Morehead. The family lived at 1 Hill Street in Edinburgh's New Town.

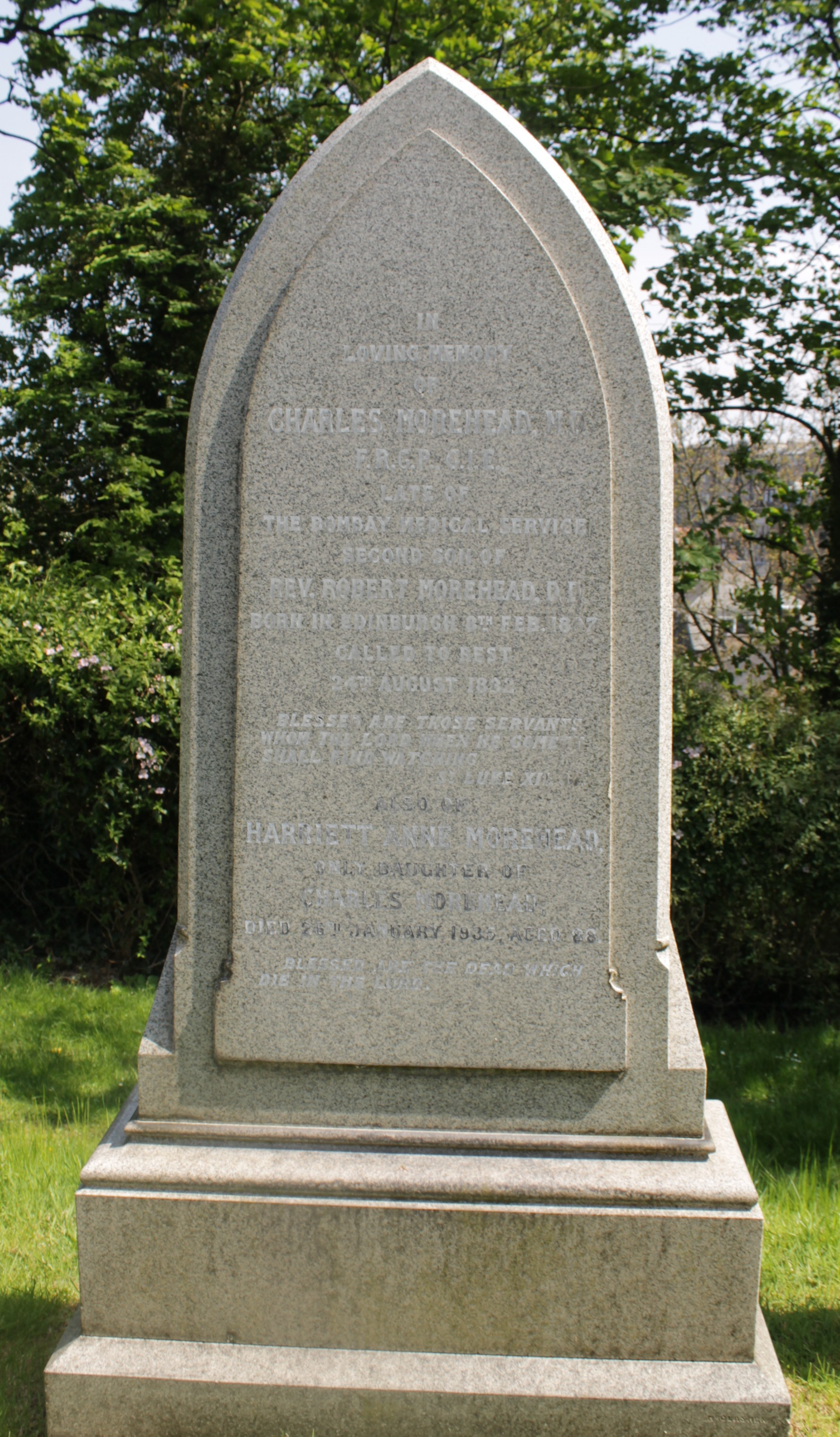
The grave of Charles Morehead, Dean Cemetery

Educated at the High School in Edinburgh, he then studied medicine at the University of Edinburgh graduating with an MD in 1828, and undertaking further studies in Paris. His teachers in Edinburgh included George Jardine and William Pulteney Alison and in Paris including Pierre Charles Alexandre Louis (1787-1872) and Rene Laennec.

In 1829 he went to India to serve in the Bombay Medical Service linked to the East India Company working under Sir Robert Grant. In 1835 they jointly founded the Grant Medical College, Morehead being its Principal from 1845. The first batch of students graduated in 1851 and included Atmaram Pandurang, J.C. Lisboa, Sebastian de Carvalho, Anunta Chandroba, Bhau Daji, Paul C. Gomes, Merwanji Sorabji, and Burjorji Dorabji. In 1857 he was made honorary surgeon to the Queen. From 1859 to 1862 he was Deputy Inspector General of Hospitals for all India. He retired in 1862 due to ill-health and although offered a professorship at the Netley Hospital, he declined it and returned to his native city of Edinburgh. His position as principal was succeeded by John Peet.

In 1866 he was elected a Fellow of the Royal Society of Edinburgh his proposer was John Hutton Balfour.

In later life he lived at 11 North Manor Place in Edinburgh's West End. In 1881, shortly before his death, Queen Victoria created him a Companion of the Order of the Indian Empire.

He died at Wilton Castle on 24 August 1882. He was returned to Edinburgh for burial in Dean Cemetery where his grave lies in the south-west spur.

== Publications ==
- Researches into the Diseases of India (1856)

== Family ==
In 1844 he married Harriet Anne daughter of George Barnes, Archdeacon of Bombay. She died in 1846.
