= William Ambrose Morehead =

British civil servant

Governor of Madras Presidency (acting)
- In office 8 June 1860 – 5 July 1860
- Preceded by: Sir Charles Trevelyan
- Succeeded by: Sir Henry George Ward
- In office 4 August 1860 – 18 February 1861
- Preceded by: Sir Henry George Ward
- Succeeded by: Sir William Thomas Denison

Personal details
- Born: 17 October 1805 Edinburgh, Scotland
- Died: 1 December 1863 (age 58) Edinburgh, Scotland

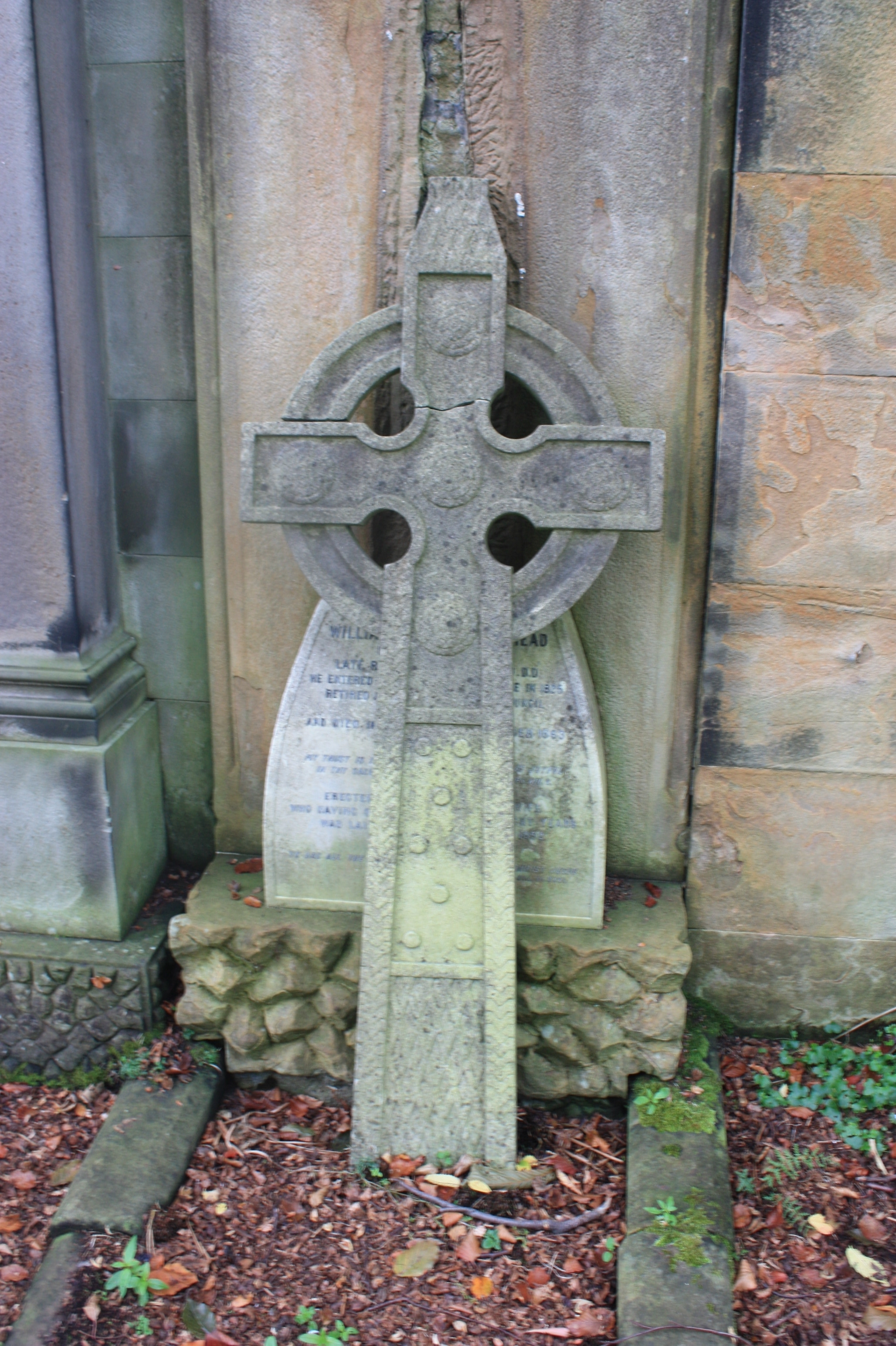
The grave of William Ambrose Morehead, Dean Cemetery

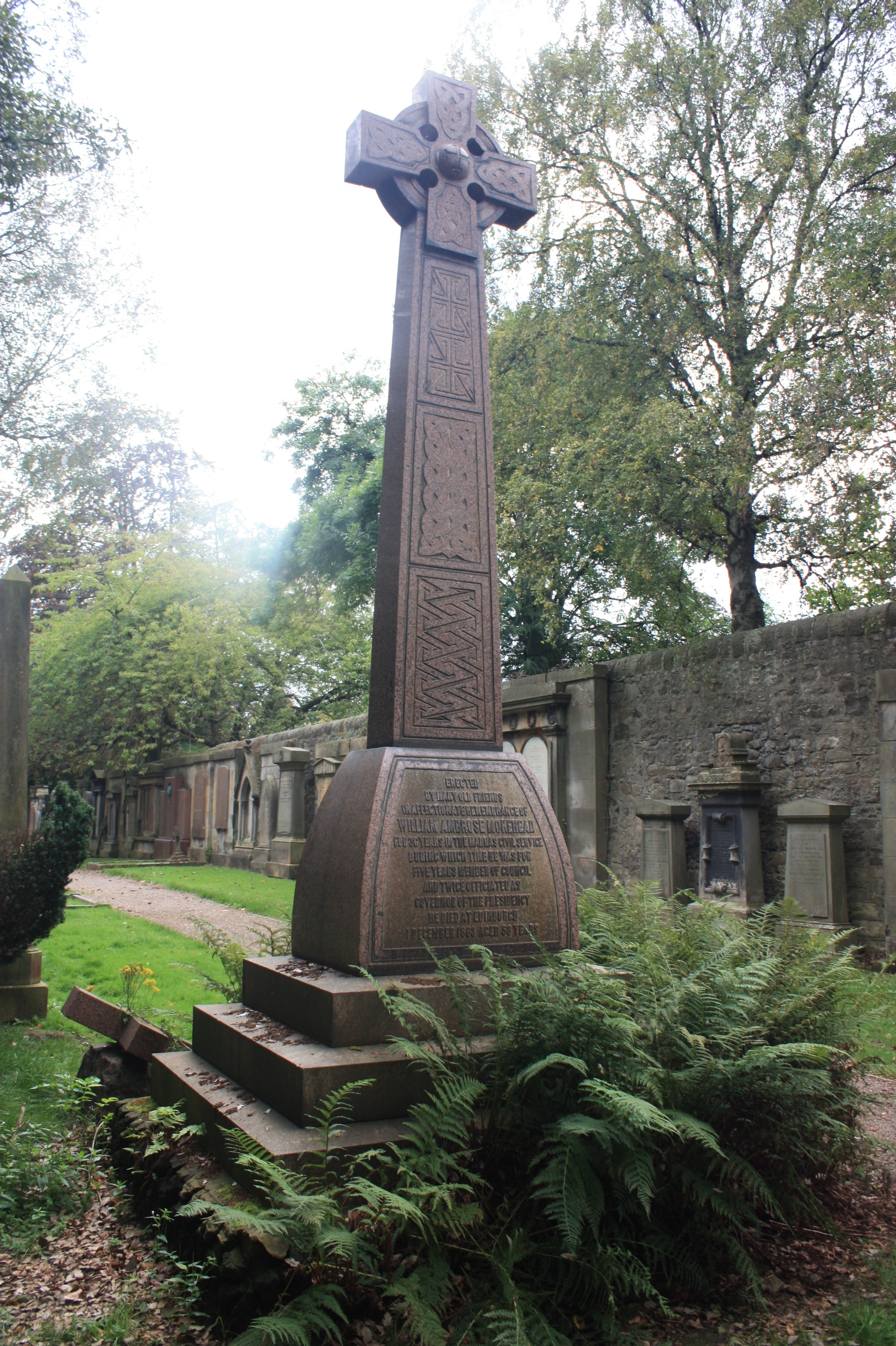
Morehead Memorial, Dean Cemetery

William Ambrose Morehead (17 October 1805 – 1 December 1863) was a British civil servant of the Indian civil service who acted as the Governor of Madras for two terms in 1860 and 1860–61.

== Early life and education ==
Morehead was born in the United Kingdom in 1805 to Rev Robert Morehead. Ambrose was also the brother of Charles Morehead who served as Governor of Bombay. Morehead had his education in United Kingdom and qualified for the Indian civil service.

== Career ==
Morehead arrived in Madras in 1825. He attained renown for his actions against a rebellion caused by the murder of Macdonald of the Indian civil service in 1832. Morehead was made a judge of the sadr court in 1846 and in 1850, was appointed to a committee which inquired into the activities of Lord Trevelyan's administration in Ceylon.

Morehead served as a member of the Madras Legislative Council from 1857 to 1862. During this time, he acted as the Governor of Madras for two terms, once in 1860 and another time, in 1860–61. He also served as Vice-Chancellor of the University of Madras from 1860 to 1862.

== Death ==
Morehead retired in October 1862 and died at Edinburgh on 1 December 1863. He is buried in the south-west spur of Dean Cemetery. The grave is heavily damaged (2014). However, a huge red granite memorial stands to his memory in front of the grave, erected by "friends" around 1880 and sculpted by Stewart McGlashen. His brother Charles lies in a separate grave in the cemetery.

== Notes ==
Government offices
Preceded by Sir Charles Trevelyan, Bt	Governor of Madras; 1860–1861	Succeeded by Sir William Thomas Denison
