= Ganpatrao Jadhav =

Indian social activist and writer (1908–1987)

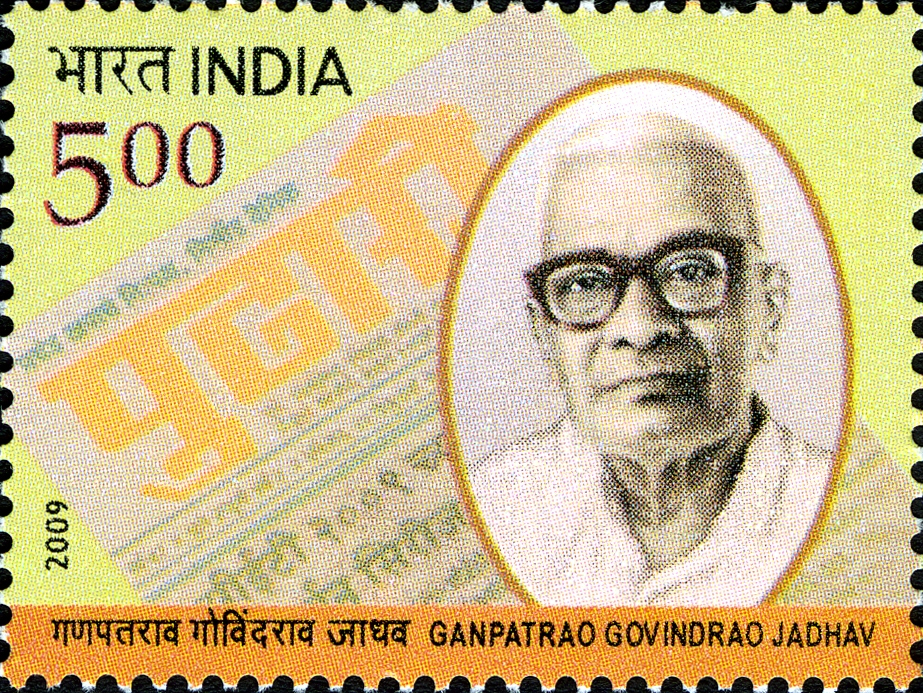
- Jadhav on a 2009 stamp of India
- Born: 5 May 1908; Gaganbavada, Kolhapur district, India
- Died: 20 May 1987 (aged 79); Kolhapur, India
- Other name: Ganpatrao Govindrao Jadhav
- Occupations: Journalist; Writer
- Years active: 1930–1987
- Known for: Pudhari
- Spouse: Indira Devi
- Children: 7, including Pratapsinh Jadhav
- Awards: Padma Shri; Kakasaheb Limye Award; Acharya Atre Award

Ganpatrao Govindrao Jadhav (5 May 1908 – 20 May 1987) was an Indian freedom activist, journalist and writer. He was the founder of Pudhari, a Marathi daily founded in 1937. The Government of India awarded him the fourth-highest Indian civilian honour of Padma Shri in 1984 and issued a commemorative postage stamp with his image on 12 November 2009.

== Biography ==
Jhadav was born on 5 May 1908 at Gaganbavada, a small hamlet in the Kolhapur district of the western Indian state of Maharashtra. His education at the local school did not go beyond the primary levels due to financial constraints, but Jhadav taught himself by reading books. He started his career as a journalist at Tej, a weekly published from Mumbai, then worked for other local publications.

During this period, he was involved with Satyashodhak Samaj, a social organization founded in 1873 by Jyotirao Phule, in their reformist activities, which gave him the opportunity to interact with several known Marathi personalities such as Keshavrao Jedhe, Dinkarrao Jawalkar, Achyutrao Kolhatkar, Bhaskarrao Jadhav, Bhargavaram Viththal Varerkar and M. G. Ranganekar. Soon, he launched a daily, Daily Kaiwari, with the assistance from Bhaskarrao Jadhav and became its editor. His association with Jyotirao Phule and Satyashodhak Samaj influenced him to participate in the Dandi March in March 1930 and he established the Kolhapur district chapter of the Satyashodhak Samaj. During the Indian civil disobedience movement of 1930, he oversaw the information flow between the Indian National Congress leadership and the frontline and underground activists. When Dinkarrao Javalkar, one of the leaders of the movement in Maharashtra was arrested by the British government, Jhadav stayed underground and organized the picketing movements at Wadi Bunder and Carnak Bunder. He continued clandestine activities till the Gandhi–Irwin Pact was signed on 5 March 1931, granting dominion status to India. During this period, he was also associated with B. R. Ambedkar for the upliftment of the dalit communities and was involved in the temple entry protest at the Kalaram Temple in March 1930.

The latter half of 1930s saw Jhadav getting involved with journalism with renewed vigour and started a weekly by name, Sevak, which was renamed Pudhari on 13 May 1937. The publication is reported to have gained popularity and from the New Year's Day of 1939, it turned a daily to become the largest circulated daily in the western Maharashtra and north Karnataka, with an online edition. Around this time, he founded the Journalists' Association of Kolhapur (Kolhapur Patrakar Sangha) and became its founder president. He also served as the president of the Satyashodhak Samaj and was involved with the Samyukta Maharashtra Movement of 1956. His involvement with the farmers led to the establishment of Kolhapur District Agriculturist Co-operative Society of which he was a founder member. His contributions are also reported in the establishment of educational institutions such as Shivaji University, Tararani Vidyapeeth and Mouni Vidyapeeth.

== Awards and honours ==
Jhadav was awarded the Kakasaheb Limye Award by the Pune Press Club in 1983. The Government of India awarded him the civilian honour of Padma Shri in 1984. He received the Acharya Atre Award of the Mumbai Marathi Patrakar Sangh in 1985 and the next year, the Shivaji University selected him for the DLitt degree (honoris causa). On 12 November 2009, the government issued a commemorative postage stamp with his image on it.

== Personal life ==
Jhadav was married to Indira Devi and the couple had a son and six daughters. He died on 20 May 1987 at the age of 79. His son, Pratapsinh Jadhav, is the incumbent head of Pudhari and is a recipient of Padma Shri in 2003.

== See also ==
- Satyashodhak Samaj
- B. R. Ambedkar
- Kalaram Temple
- Samyukta Maharashtra Movement
- Pudhari
- Jyotirao Phule
