= Feminism in India =

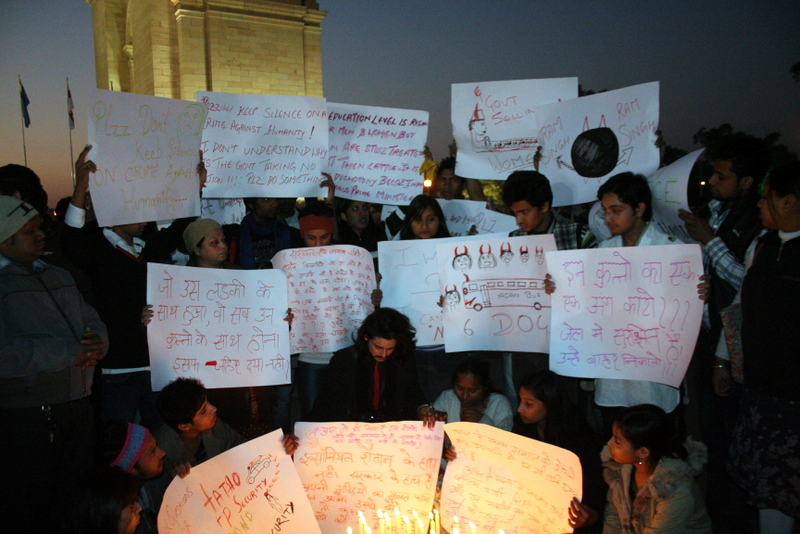
Protest against 2012 Delhi gang rape and murder

Feminism in India is a set of movements aimed at defining, establishing, and defending equal political, economic, and social rights and opportunities for women in India. It is the pursuit of women's rights within the society of India. Like their feminist counterparts all over the world, feminists in India seek gender equality: the right to work for equality in wages, the right to equal access to health and education, and equal political rights. Indian feminists also have fought against what they claim are culture-specific fundamental issues within India's patriarchal society, such as inheritance laws.

The history of feminism in India can be divided into three phases: the first phase, beginning in the mid-19th century, initiated when reformists began to speak in favour of women rights by making reforms in education and customs involving women; the second phase, from 1915 to Indian independence, when Gandhi incorporated women's movements into the Quit India movement and independent women's organisations began to emerge; and finally, the third phase, post-independence, which has focused on fair treatment of women at home after marriage as well as the work force, and their right to political parity.

Despite the progress made by Indian feminist movements, women living in modern India still face many issues of discrimination. India's patriarchal culture has made the process of gaining land-ownership rights and access to education challenging for women. Women often opted to become commercial surrogates as a means of procuring income until 2025, when it was banned. In the past two decades, there has also emerged a trend of sex-selective abortion. To Indian feminists, these are seen as injustices worth struggling against and feminism is often misunderstood by Indians as female domination rather than equality.

As in the West, there has been some criticism of feminist movements in India. They have especially been criticised for focusing too much on privileged women, and neglecting the needs and representation of poorer or lower caste women. This has led to the creation of caste-specific feminist organisations and movements.

== Definition in the Indian context ==
In modern India, women's issues first began to be structurally addressed when the state commissioned a report on the status of women to a group of feminist researchers and activists. The report recognised the fact that in India, women were oppressed under a system of structural hierarchies and injustices. During this period, Indian feminists were influenced by the Western debates being conducted about violence against women. However, due to the difference in the historical and social culture of India, the debate in favour of Indian women had to be conducted creatively, and certain Western ideas had to be rejected. These movements called for education and equal rights but also adapted their appeals to local issues and concerns, such as dowry-related violence against women, Sati, sex-selective abortion, and custodial rape. Accordingly, many Indian feminists simultaneously claim a specific "Indian" sensitivity as well as international feminist solidarity with groups and individuals worldwide. Women's issues began to gain an international prominence when the decade of 1975–1985 was declared the United Nations Decade for Women.

Indian feminists face certain obstacles in Indian society that are not present or as prevalent in Western society. While Indian feminists have the same ultimate goal as their Western counterparts, their version of feminism can differ in many ways in order to tackle the kind of issues and circumstances they face in the modern-day patriarchal society of India. In the area of religion, Indian feminists draw attention to the powerful image of female Goddesses in Hinduism. They also point out the matriarchal pre-history of Indian society and emphasise that there have been periods of Indian history that were not patriarchal, and communities existed in India that were largely female-orientated and matriarchal.

Indian women negotiate survival through an array of oppressive patriarchal family structures: age, ordinal status, relationship to men through family of origin, marriage and procreation, and patriarchal attributes. Examples of patriarchal attributes include dowry, siring sons etc., kinship, caste, community, village, market, and the state. It should, however, be noted that several communities in India, such as the Nairs of Kerala, and the Shettys of Mangalore exhibit matriarchal tendencies. In these communities, the head of the family is the oldest woman, rather than the oldest man. Sikh culture is also regarded as relatively gender-neutral. (Note: The last Sikh Guru Guru Gobind Singh, gave all Sikh females regardless of their age or marital status the name of Kaur meaning that they would not have to take their husband's name if they married.) In India, of communities recognised in the national Constitution as Scheduled Tribes, "some ... [are] matriarchal and matrilineal" "and thus have been known to be more egalitarian."

The heterogeneity of the Indian experience reveals that there are multiple patriarchies, contributing to the existence of multiple feminism. Hence, feminism in India is not a singular theoretical orientation; it has changed over time in relation to historical and cultural realities, levels of consciousness, perceptions and actions of individual women and women as a group. The widely used definition is "An awareness of women's oppression and exploitation in society, at work and within the family, and conscious action by women and men to change this situation." Acknowledging sexism in daily life and attempting to challenge and eliminate it through deconstructing mutually exclusive notions of femininity and masculinity as biologically determined categories opens the way towards an equitable society for both men and women.

== History ==
Feminism as an initiative started independently in Maharashtra by the pioneer of women's rights and education: Savitribai Phule, who started the first school for girls in India (1848); Tarabai Shinde, who wrote India's first feminist text Stri Purush Tulana (A Comparison Between Women and Men) in 1882; and Pandita Ramabai, who criticized patriarchy and caste-system in Hinduism, married outside her caste and converted to Christianity (1880s). The efforts of Bengali reformers included abolishing sati, which was a widow's death by burning on her husband's funeral pyre, abolishing the custom of child marriage, abolishing the disfiguring of widows, introducing the marriage of upper caste Hindu widows, promoting women's education, obtaining legal rights for women to own property, and requiring the law to acknowledge women's status by granting them basic rights in matters such as adoption.

The 19th century was the period that saw a majority of women's issues which came under the spotlight and reforms began to be made. Much of the early reforms for Indian women were conducted by men. However, by the late 19th century they were joined in their efforts by their wives, sisters, daughters, protegees and other individuals directly affected by campaigns such as those carried out for women's education.

In the 1920s, Periyar E.V. Ramasamy challenged long-ingrained patriarchy by opposing marriage as an instrument of enslavement for women. He challenged gendered chastity, advocated the right to divorce without abuse, and stressed economic independence and education as prerequisites for authentic freedom.

By the late 20th century, women gained greater autonomy through the formation of independent women's own organisations. By the late thirties and forties, a new narrative began to be constructed regarding "women's activism". This was newly researched and expanded with the vision to create 'logical' and organic links between feminism and Marxism, as well as with anti-communalism and anti-casteism, etc. The Constitution of India did guarantee "equality between the sexes", which created a relative lull in women's movements until the 1970s.

During the formative years of women's rights movements, the difference between the sexes was more or less taken for granted in that their roles, functions, aims and desires were different. As a result, they were not only to be reared differently but also treated differently. Over the course of time, this difference itself became a major reason for initiating women's movements. Early 19th century reformers argued that the difference between men and women was no reason for the subjection of women in society. However, later reformers were of the opinion that indeed it was this particular difference that subjugated women to their roles in society, for example, as mothers. Therefore, there was a need for the proper care of women's rights. With the formation of women's organisations and their own participation in campaigns, their roles as mothers were again stressed but in a different light: this time the argument was for women's rights to speech, education and emancipation. However, the image of women with the mother as a symbol underwent changes over time – from an emphasis on family to the creation of an archetypal mother figure, evoking deep, often atavistic images.

=== First phase: 1850–1915 ===
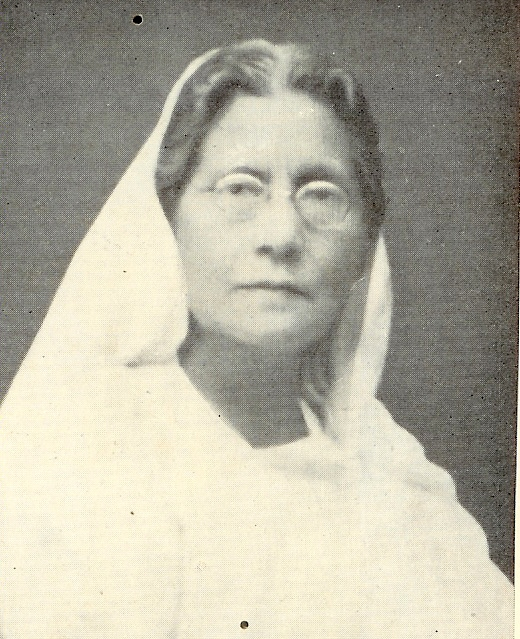
Kamini Roy (poet and suffragette) became the first woman Honors Graduate in India in 1886.

The colonial venture into modernity brought concepts of democracy, equality and individual rights. The rise of the concept of nationalism and introspection of discriminatory practices brought about social reform movements related to caste and gender relations. This first phase of feminism in India was initiated by men to uproot the social evils, to allow remarriage of widows, to forbid child marriage, and to reduce illiteracy. It also aimed to regulate the age of consent and to ensure property rights through legal intervention. However, efforts for improving the status of women in Indian society were somewhat thwarted by the late nineteenth century, as nationalist movements emerged in India. These movements resisted 'colonial interventions in gender relations' particularly in the areas of family relations. In the mid to late nineteenth century, there was a national form of resistance to any colonial efforts made to 'modernize' the Hindu family. This included the Age of Consent controversy that erupted after the government tried to raise the age of marriage for women.

Several Indian states were ruled by women during British colonial advance including Jhansi (Rani Laxmibai), Kittur (Rani Chennama), Bhopal (Qudsia Begum) and Punjab (Jind Kaur).

=== Second Phase: 1915–1947 ===
During this period the struggle against colonial rule intensified. Nationalism became the pre-eminent cause. Claiming Indian sovereignty became the tool of cultural revivalism resulting in an essential model of Indian womanhood similar to that of Victorian womanhood: special yet separated from public space. Gandhi legitimized and expanded Indian women's public activities by initiating them into the non-violent civil disobedience movement against the British Raj. He exalted their feminine roles of caring, self-abnegation, sacrifice and tolerance; and carved a niche for those in the public arena. Peasant women played an important role in the rural satyagrahas of Borsad and Bardoli. Women-only organisations like All India Women's Conference (AIWC) and the National Federation of Indian Women (NFIW) emerged. Women were grappling with issues relating to the scope of women's political participation, women's franchise, communal awards, and leadership roles in political parties.

The 1920s was a new era for Indian women and is defined as 'feminism' that was responsible for the creation of localized women's associations. These associations emphasized women's education issues, developed livelihood strategies for working-class women, and also organised national level women's associations such as the All India Women's Conference. AIWC was closely affiliated with the Indian National Congress. Under the leadership of Mahatma Gandhi, it worked within the nationalist and anti-colonialist freedom movements. This made the mass mobilisation of women an integral part of Indian nationalism. Women therefore were a very important part of various nationalist and anti-colonial efforts, including the civil disobedience movements in the 1930s.

After independence, the All India Women's Conference continued to operate and in 1954 the Indian Communist Party formed its own women's wing known as the National Federation of Indian Women. However, feminist agendas and movements became less active right after India's 1947 independence, as the nationalist agendas on nation building took precedence over feminist issues.

Women's participation in the struggle for freedom developed their critical consciousness about their role and rights in independent India. This resulted in the introduction of the franchise and civic rights of women in the Indian constitution. There was provision for women's upliftment through affirmative action, maternal health and child care provision (crèches), equal pay for equal work etc. The state adopted a patronizing role towards women. For example, India's constitution states that women are a "weaker section" of the population, and therefore need assistance to function as equals. Thus women in India did not have to struggle for basic rights as did women in the West. The utopia ended soon when the social and cultural ideologies and structures failed to honour the newly acquired concepts of fundamental rights and democracy.

=== Third Phase: Post 1947 ===
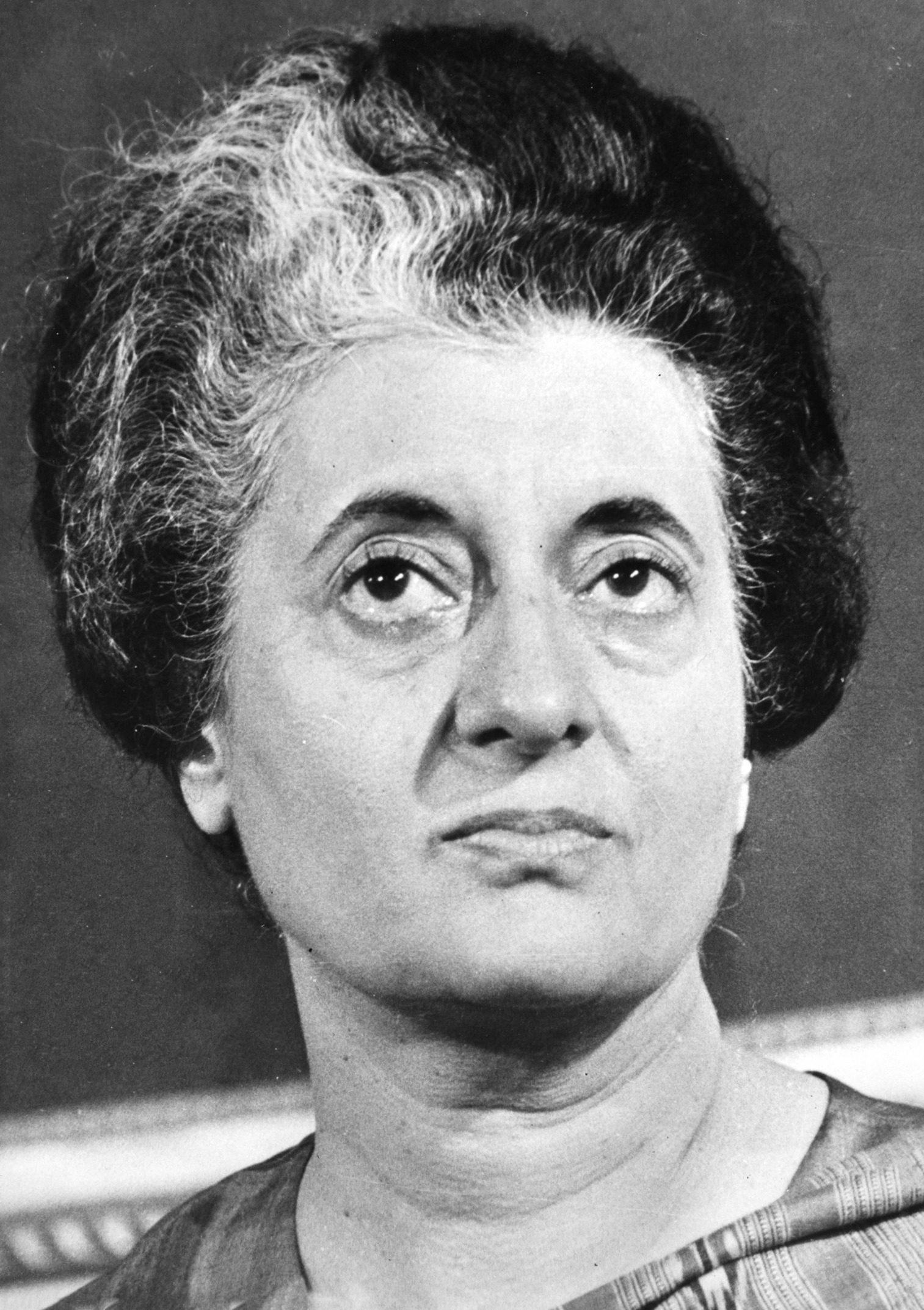
Indira Gandhi (née Nehru) was the only child of the India's first Prime Minister, Jawaharlal Nehru. She is the first and only woman Prime Minister of India and the second-longest-serving Prime Minister.

Post independence feminists began to redefine the extent to which women were allowed to engage in the workforce. However, feminists in the 1970s challenged the inequalities that had been established and fought to reverse them. These inequalities included unequal wages for women, relegation of women to 'unskilled' spheres of work, and restricting women as a reserve army for labour. In other words, the feminists' aim was to abolish the free service of women who were essentially being used as cheap capital. Feminist class-consciousness also came into focus in the 1970s, with feminists recognizing the inequalities not just between men and women but also within power structures such as caste, tribe, language, religion, region, class etc. This also posed as a challenge for feminists while shaping their overreaching campaigns as there had to be a focus within efforts to ensure that fulfilling the demands of one group would not create further inequalities for another. Now, in the early twenty-first century, the focus of the Indian feminist movement has gone beyond treating women as useful members of society and a right to parity, but also having the power to decide the course of their personal lives and the right of self-determination.

==== Key Movements ====
In 1972, an Adivasi teenage girl named Mathura was raped by two policemen while in custody at a police station in Gadchiroli, Maharashtra. In the resulting court case, the court sided with the two officers because Mathura was perceived to be of "loose morals," because she had a boyfriend and hence was used to sexual intercourse. Furthermore, Mathura did not have any physical marks on her body and had not raised an alarm. After the ruling, four professors at Delhi University wrote an open letter to the chief justice of India protesting the decision. This resulted in further protests, including but not limited to marches across several cities, seminars and a sit-down protest in Delhi. These protests are often credited for amendments in the Criminal Law Amendment Act, 1983. Most notably, this act included particularly strict punishments for custodial rape and clarified that passive submission does not constitute consent.

The Nirbhaya rape case of 2012 is also considered a watershed moment in Indian feminist movements. A 22 year old female and her male friend were returning home late in the night after watching a film at the cinema. While returning on a bus, the male was knocked unconscious and the female was violently gang-raped by six men, including one juvenile. Protests for women safety erupted across the country including clashes at the Parliament of India in Delhi and a protest with more than 1000 people in Kolkata. Several metro stations in New Delhi were closed in order to discourage protesters from gathering for protests. In response to these protests, some states, such as Karnataka and Tamil Nadu introduced plans to improve women's safety. More broadly, the federal government formed the Justice Verma Committee in order to make concrete suggestions to improve woman's safety.

Notable Achievements

In 1966 Indira Gandhi became the first woman Prime Minister of India. She served as prime minister of India for three consecutive terms (1966–1977) and a fourth term from 1980 until she was assassinated in 1984.

Section 53A of the Code of Criminal Procedure of the Indian law, 1973 lays down certain provisions for medical examination of the accused. Section 164A of the Code of Criminal Procedure deals with the medical examination of the victim.

Mary Roy won a lawsuit in 1986, against the inheritance legislation of her Keralite Syrian Christian community in the Supreme Court. The judgement ensured equal rights for Syrian Christian women with their male siblings in regard to their ancestral property. Until then, her Syrian Christian community followed the provisions of the Travancore Succession Act of 1916 and the Cochin Succession Act, 1921, while elsewhere in India the same community followed the Indian Succession Act of 1925.

In 1991, the Kerala High Court restricted entry of women above the age of 10 and below the age of 50 from Sabarimala Shrine as they were of the menstruating age. However, on 28 September 2018, the Supreme Court of India lifted the ban on the entry of women. It said that discrimination against women on any grounds, even religious, is unconstitutional.

The state of Kerala is often viewed as the ideal progressive leader in the women's rights movement in India among states. Kerala maintains very high relative levels of women's literacy and women's health, as well as greater female inheritance and property rights. For example, a 1998 study conducted by Bina Agarwal found that while only 13% of all women in India with landowning fathers inherited that land as daughters, 24% of such women were able to do so in the state of Kerala. This is important because it has been shown that measures to improve such access to property and economic independence through channels such as education not only directly improve women's wellbeing and capabilities, but also reduce their risk of exposure to marital or any sort of domestic violence.

The Protection of Women from Domestic Violence Act 2005 is an Act of the Parliament of India enacted to protect women from domestic violence. It was brought into force by the Indian government from 26 October 2006. The Act provides for the first time in Indian law a definition of "domestic violence", with this definition being broad and including not only physical violence, but also other forms of violence such as emotional/verbal, sexual, and economic abuse. It is a civil law meant primarily for protection orders and not meant to penalize criminally. However, as per the recent study 51.5% males have experienced the violence from their wives/partner. Many men feel bad to share about they are being beaten by their wives. Also, as per the research Married men have reported the domestic violence.

The Sexual Harassment of Women at Workplace (Prevention, Prohibition and Redressal) Act, 2013 is a legislative act in India that seeks to protect women from sexual harassment at their place of work. The Act came into force from 9 December 2013. The Criminal Law (Amendment) Act, 2013 introduced changes to the Indian Penal Code, making sexual harassment an expressed offence under Section 354 A, which is punishable up to three years of imprisonment and or with fine. The Amendment also introduced new sections making acts like disrobing a woman without consent, stalking and sexual acts by person in authority an offense. It also made acid attacks a specific offence with a punishment of imprisonment not less than 10 years and which could extend to life imprisonment and with fine. The definition of rape under the law was expanded to consider rape as any acts like penetration by penis, or any object or any part of body to any extent, into the vagina, mouth, urethra or anus of a woman or making her to do so with another person or applying of mouth to sexual organs without the consent or will of the woman constitutes the offence of rape. The section has also clarified that penetration means "penetration to any extent", and lack of physical resistance is immaterial for constituting an offence. Except in certain aggravated situation the punishment will be imprisonment not less than seven years but which may extend to imprisonment for life, and shall also be liable to fine. In aggravated situations, punishment will be rigorous imprisonment for a term which shall not be less than ten years but which may extend to imprisonment for life, and shall also be liable to fine. The revised statutes of 2013 Indian law, in section 376A, also mandates minimum punishment in certain cases. For instance, if the sexual assault inflicts an injury which causes death or causes the victim to be in a persistent vegetative state, then the convicted rapist must be sentenced to rigorous imprisonment of at least twenty years and up to the remainder of the natural life or with a death penalty." In the case of "gang rape", the same mandatory sentencing is now required by law. The convicted is also required to pay compensation to the victim which shall be reasonable to meet the medical expenses and rehabilitation of the victim, and per Section 357 B in the Code of Criminal Procedure. Death penalty for the most extreme rape cases is specified. The new law has made it mandatory for all government and privately run hospitals in India to give free first aid and medical treatment to victims of rape. The 2013 law also increased the age of consent from 16 years to 18 years, and any sexual activity with anyone less than age of 18, irrespective of consent, now constitutes statutory rape.

In May 2013, the Supreme Court of India held that the two-finger test on a rape victim violates her right to privacy, and asked the Delhi government to provide better medical procedures to confirm sexual assault.

In 2014, an Indian family court in Mumbai ruled that a husband objecting to his wife wearing a kurta and jeans and forcing her to wear a sari amounted to cruelty, which led to the wife being granted a divorce. In 2016 a judgment of the Delhi high court was made public in which it was ruled that the eldest female member of a Hindu Undivided Family can be its "Karta".

In 2018 the Supreme Court of India struck down a law making it a crime for a man to have sex with a married woman without the permission of her husband. Prior to November 2018, women were forbidden to climb Agasthyarkoodam. A court ruling removed the prohibition.

In 2025 the Supreme Court of India overturned a decision of the Madras High Court that had denied a government school teacher maternity leave related to the birth of her third child.

== Issues ==
Despite "on-paper" advancements, many problems still remain which inhibit women from fully taking advantage of new rights and opportunities in India.

There are many traditions and customs that have been an important part of Indian culture for hundreds of years. Religious laws and expectations, or "personal laws" enumerated by each specific religion, often conflict with the Indian Constitution, eliminating rights and powers women should legally have. Despite these crossovers in legality, the Indian government does not interfere with religion and the personal laws they hold. Indian society is largely composed of hierarchical systems within families and communities. These hierarchies can be broken down into age, sex, ordinal position, kinship relationships (within families), and caste, lineage, wealth, occupations, and relationship to ruling power (within the community). When hierarchies emerge within the family based on social convention and economic need, girls in poorer families suffer twice the impact of vulnerability and stability. From birth, girls are automatically entitled to less; from playtime, to food, to education, girls can expect to always be entitled to less than their brothers. Girls also have less access to their family's income and assets, which is exacerbated among poor, rural Indian families. From the start, it is understood that females will be burdened with strenuous work and exhausting responsibilities for the rest of their lives, always with little to no compensation or recognition.

India is also a patriarchal society, which, by definition, describes cultures in which males as fathers or husbands are assumed to be in charge and the official heads of households. A patrilineal system governs the society, where descent and inheritance are traced through the male line and men are generally in control of the distribution of family resources.

These traditions and ways of Indian life have been in effect for so long that this type of lifestyle is what women have become accustomed to and expect. Indian women often do not take full advantage of their constitutional rights because they are not properly aware or informed of them. Women also tend to have poor utilization of voting rights because they possess low levels of political awareness and sense of political efficacy. Women are not often encouraged to become informed about issues. Due to this, political parties do not invest much time in female candidates because there is a perception that they are a "wasted investment".

The female-to-male ratio in India is 933 to 1000, showing that there are numerically fewer women in the country than men. This is due to several factors, including infanticides, most commonly among female infants, and the poor care of female infants and childbearing women. Although outlawed, infanticides are still very common in rural India, and are continuing to become even more prominent. This is due to the fact, most especially in rural areas, that families cannot afford female children because of the dowry they must pay when their daughter gets married. Like infanticide, the payment of dowry is also illegal, but is still a frequent and prevalent occurrence in rural India. Women are considered to be "worthless" by their husbands if they are not "able" to produce a male child, and can often face much abuse if this is the case.

=== Birth ratio ===
Between the years of 1991 to 2001, the female-male ratio of the population of India fell from 94.5 girls per 100 boys to 92.7 girls per 100 boys. Some parts of the country, such as Kerala, did not experience such a decline, but in the richer Indian states of Punjab, Haryana, Gujarat, and Maharashtra, the female-male ratio fell very sharply (the female-male ratios in these states were between 79.3 and 87.8). This is the evidence of natality inequality, and an indication that sex-selective abortion has become more pervasive. The Indian parliament has banned the use of sex determination techniques for foetuses due to this, but enforcement of this law has been largely ignored.

=== Marriage ===
Most of the average Indian woman's life is spent in marriage; many women are still married before the legal age of 18, and the incidence of non-marriage is low in India. Childbearing and raising children are the priorities of early adulthood for Indian women. Thus, if they enter the workforce at all, it is far later than Indian men. Urban Indian men reach the peak of their labour force participation between the ages of 25 and 29, while urban Indian women do so between the ages of 40 and 44. Because of this, women have less time for the acquisition of skills and fewer opportunities for job improvements.

There is a poor representation of women in the Indian workforce. Females have a ten percent higher drop-out rate than males from middle and primary schools, as well as lower levels of literacy than men. Since unemployment is also high in India, it is easy for employers to manipulate the law, especially when it comes to women, because it is part of Indian culture for women not to argue with men. Additionally, labour unions are insensitive to women's needs. Women also have to settle for jobs that comply with their obligations as wives, mothers, and homemakers.

Indian feminists attempt to challenge the patriarchal structure of their society in a variety of ways. Sampat Pal Devi is a former government worker and mother of five, who noticed domestic abuse and violence within her own community as she grew up in India. As a result, she decided to start a vigilant group known as the 'Gulabi Gang' who track down abusers and beat them with bamboo sticks until it is believed that they have repented and victims have been sufficiently avenged.. The Gulabi Gang in India wear pink saris and carry lathis (bamboo staves) for protection against physical attack, and punish abusive husbands, publicly shaming and sometimes beating them. They also watch out for and expose dowry beatings, dowry death, rape, child marriages, desertion, depriving girls of education, child molestation, and sexual harassment. They have invaded police stations to demand that police investigate these matters, and other things that affect the community such as corruption. India's police are notoriously corrupt and sometimes only the threat of a full-scale female riot will get them to act. Nobody knows quite how many of them there are. Estimates range from 270,000 to 400,000.

In 2018 the Supreme Court of India struck down a law making it a crime for a man to have sex with a married woman without the permission of her husband.

=== Commercial Surrogacy ===
In 2002, the Indian Council of Medical Research published new guidelines that lacked express legal sanction of commercial surrogacy, thereby unofficially allowing it. This legal freedom allowed medical tourism agencies like Planet Hospital, which offers surrogacy services at a fraction of their cost in the US, to thrive and eventually develop India into a world hub of commercial surrogacy.

Surrogates in India are kept under stricter surveillance than in the US. They live in supervised homes, stick to regulated diets, are not allowed to engage in sexual relations, and are tested regularly for diseases and other medical conditions. These conditions make turning to India for surrogacy more enticing, as they allow infertile women to have more control over the surrogacy process and the surrogate's gestation.

India's patriarchy is frequently understood to frame motherhood as the reason for a woman's existence, wherein becoming mothers elevates women to "goddess status." Advances in reproductive technology like surrogacy ideally allow surrogate women to altruistically utilize their procreative capability in order to help fulfill another woman's maternal desire, but critics of commercial surrogacy in India have posited that both infertile women and surrogates are victimized by the patriarchy in this situation. Infertile women, they argue, are coerced into employing a surrogate by the patriarchal endorsement of motherhood, viewing it as necessary in order to fulfill the 'essence of being a woman'. On the other hand, women who choose to become surrogates are involved primarily due to monetary incentives, and yet surrogates are underpaid because the work they do is seen as emotionally fulfilling — monetary compensation is often considered secondary.

In response to public outcry surrounding commercial surrogacy, India introduced the Surrogacy (Regulation) Bill in August 2016, which sought to ban commercial surrogacy, allowing only "altruistic surrogacy," which would require surrogates to have at least one existing child and be closely related to the couple they wish to be a surrogate for. The 2016 bill lapsed after the parliamentary session ended and was reintroduced in 2019. After 2019 the bill was further amended into the Surrogacy (Regulation) Act, which was approved in 2021 and came into effect in 2022. The act effectively achieved the goals of the 2016 bill.

Opponents of this bill have called attention to how this legislation discriminates against couples who don't have a 'close relative' who could surrogate for them. They also point out how exploitation surrounding surrogacy extends beyond being merely an economic problem; many familial relations, they argue, have the potential to become similarly exploitative, as couples may end up pressuring sisters or sisters in law to take on an unwanted role as surrogate.

=== Clothing ===
Another issue that concerns women is the dress code expected of them. In 2014, an Indian family court in Mumbai ruled that a husband objecting to his wife wearing a kurta and jeans and forcing her to wear a sari amounts to cruelty inflicted by the husband and can be a ground to seek divorce. The wife was thus granted a divorce on the ground of cruelty as defined under section 27(1)(d) of Special Marriage Act, 1954.

== Theology ==
=== Hindu community ===
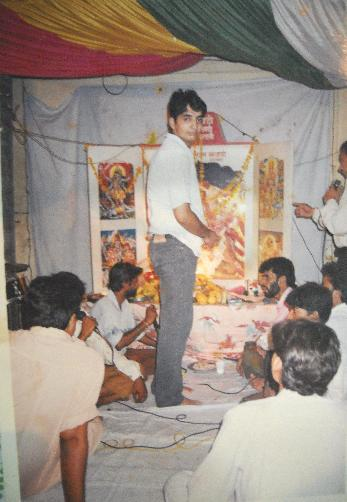
A jagran in honour of Devi, the Hindu goddess.

In the Hindu religion, there has been partial success in terms of gender equality reform laws and family law. While this is a major advancement relative to other religions in India, it is still not a complete triumph in terms of feminism and relieving oppression. Both the deity of knowledge and the deity of wealth are female. In 1991, the Kerala High Court restricted entry of women above the age of 10 and below the age of 50 from Sabarimala Shrine as they were of the menstruating age. However, on 28 September 2018, the Supreme Court of India lifted the ban on the entry of women. It said that discrimination against women on any grounds, even religious, is unconstitutional.

The ancient scriptures and texts seem to provide evidence that gender of these deities was not seen as binary but more like a spectrum. The creator, Brahma (the creator), is perceived by many Hindus to be genderless. Many gods, such as 'Ardhanarishvara' are also seen as androgynous. There are several words in Sanskrit and Tamil, such as 'pedi', 'kliba' and 'sanda' that suggest that civilization has long been familiar with queer thought and behavior. The idea of ardhanariswara, a symbol of god as half male half female is also an appealing way to represent Brahman in human terms because the boundaries of male-ness and female ness are not apparent. When a person grapples with the idea of a form-less, all encompassing Brahman that pervades all forms, one does not need to think of atomized, essentialized females and males. Shakti, female strength/power, is about regenerate, which rests on creation and destruction. This dual personification of god as female and male and the preeminence of shakti in symbolism is a unique symbolism. At least in the realm of religious symbolism, there is nothing that makes females feel lesser than males.

=== Muslim community ===
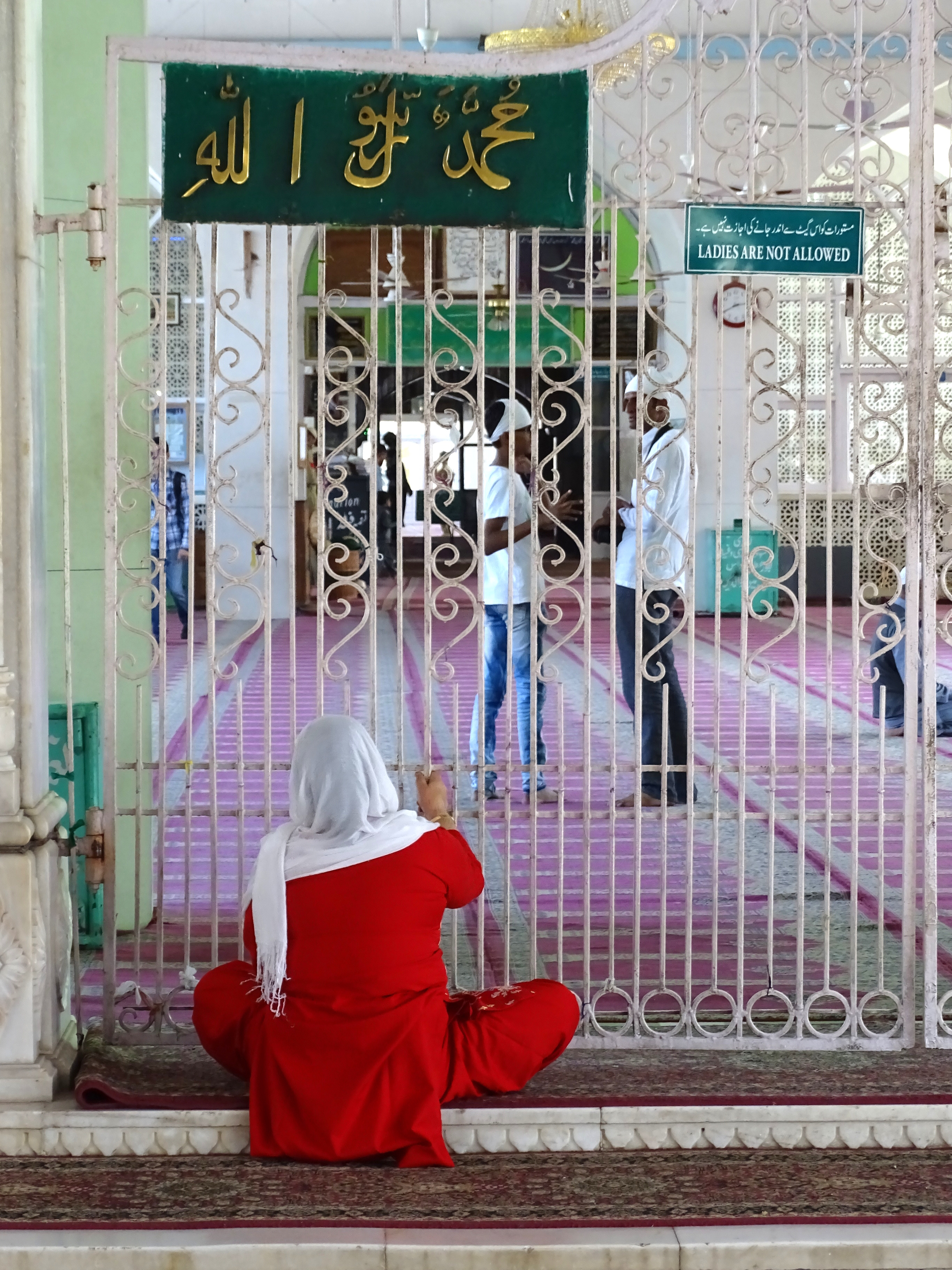
Woman sitting at the threshold of the main building of Hazratbal shrine in Srinagar, Jammu and Kashmir, as the sign on the gate reads "Ladies Are Not Allowed"

The case of Shah Bano begun in 1985 was one such example of Rajiv Gandhi attempting to make "concessions" for the Muslim community to in turn secure support for the Congress. Shah Bano, a 73-year-old Muslim woman, was divorced by her husband after forty-three years of marriage. According to the Sharia or Muslim Law, her husband was not required to pay her alimony. Shah Bano challenged this decision in the Supreme Court, which ultimately ruled in her favour and ordered her husband to pay her a monthly maintenance allowance. Critics found Congress' support to pass a law to nullify the judgment wrong and politically opportunistic.

Awaaz-e-Niswaan (The Voice of Women) was found in 1987 in Mumbai in largely Muslim part of the city. The Muslim community has personal laws that often were considered harmful to the rights of Muslim women. The Muslim personal law allows Polygamy but not Polyandry.

Article 14 of the Indian Constitution states 'Equality before law' and grants every person equality before the law and equal protection in India. Article 15 prohibits discrimination based on religion, race, caste, sex or place of birth. Muslims women in India however are used as both an instrument and symbol for Islam in South Asia. Muslim Personal Law governs many aspects of a married Muslim Woman's rights in India.

Islam although being one of the first religions to advocate for women's rights both socially and in the political arena, has been heavily misinterpreted over the years with the death of the Islamic prophet Muhammad and with the residency of Islam in different societies. In India, "like Hindu women, Muslim women also demanded legal redress for polygamy, child marriage, purdah and denial of property rights".

Constitutional laws in India have taken more initiative to improve gender equality than Muslim Personal Law. In addition Muslim women in India face larger issues in "illiteracy, social conservatism ... economic dependence on men, domestic and social violence, a wide gap between formal constitutional equality and actual inequality, inferiority and subordination of Indian women.".

=== Sikh community ===
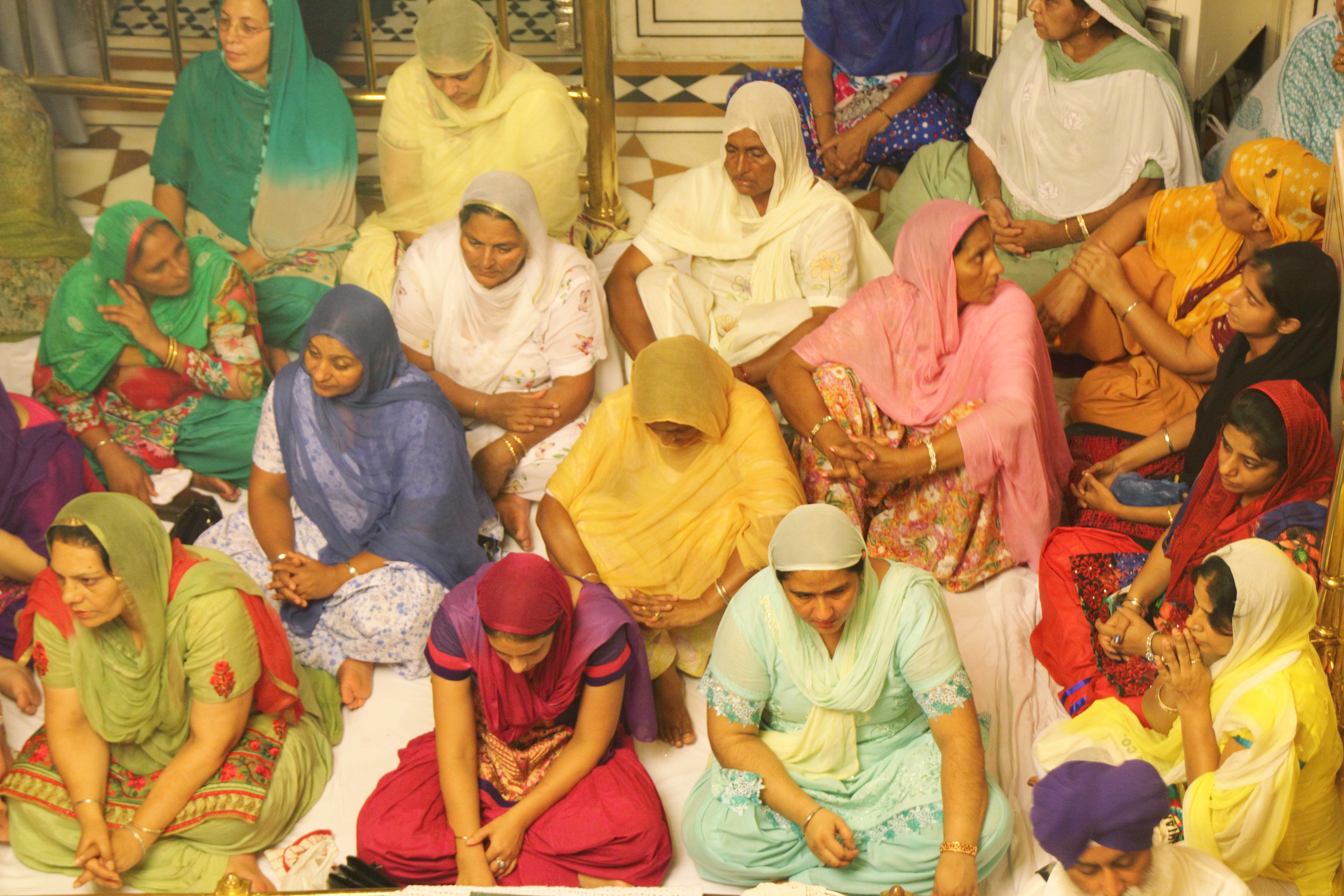
Female pilgrims inside the Harmandir Sahib

According to Sikh tradition, both men and women are to follow the five Ks: Kesh (uncut hair), Kangha (comb), Kara (iron bracelet), Kachera (cotton undergarment) and Kirpan (iron dagger). Both men and women are to be treated equally inside a Gurudwara, and required to follow the same etiquette: both men and women should cover their head and wear modest clothing, both sit side by side in congregation and to eat langar. Although Sikh scriptures are usually publicly recited by men, there are no restrictions on who can become a granthi, and women can also apply. Both men and women can choose to wear a turban. Sikh women usually take the surname Kaur, with the purpose of rejecting both casteism and inequality among men and women. Similarly, Sikh men usually take the surname Singh. The Sikh faith condemns the practices of female infanticide, widow burning, dowry, and treatment of menstruating women as impure, and also discourages seclusion and face veil. However, many of these are still practiced by Sikhs.

== Impact ==
Feminism did not gain meaning or become an operational principle in Indian life until the country gained independence in 1947 and adopted a democratic government. The Indian Constitution then granted equality, freedom from discrimination based on gender or religion, and guaranteed religious freedoms. Also, seven five-year plans were developed to provide health, education, employment, and welfare to women. The sixth five-year plan even declared women "partners in development".

=== Employment ===
In general, in the uneducated and rural sections of Indian society, which form a major percentage of the total population, women are seen as economic burdens. Their contributions to productivity are mostly invisible as their familial and domestic contributions are overlooked. Indian women were contributing nearly 36 percent of total employment in agriculture and related activities, nearly 19 percent in the service sector, and nearly 12.5 in the industry sector as of the year 2000. High illiteracy rates among women confine them to lower paying, unskilled jobs with less job security than men. Even in agricultural jobs where the work of men and women are highly similar, women are still more likely to be paid less for the same amount and type of work as men. Although the Government of India has tried to eliminate inequality in the workforce, women still receive unequal treatment. "Men are more likely to get promotions than women—besides, for men the nature of their jobs often changed with these promotions, unlike women, who usually only got increased responsibility and higher workload.". However, AIIMS nurses union has alleged gender discrimination for Nursing Officers recruitment, giving 80 percent posts to female candidates and remaining to male candidates.

In 1955 the Bollywood group Cine Costume Make-Up Artist & Hair Dressers' Association (CCMAA) created a rule that did not allow women to obtain memberships as makeup artists. However, in 2014 the Supreme Court of India ruled that this rule was in violation of the Indian constitutional guarantees granted under Article 14 (right to equality), 19(1)(g) (freedom to carry out any profession) and Article 21 (right to liberty). The judges of the Supreme Court of India stated that the ban on women makeup artist members had no "rationale nexus" to the cause sought to be achieved and was "unacceptable, impermissible and inconsistent" with the constitutional rights guaranteed to the citizens. The Court also found illegal the rule which mandated that for any artist, female or male, to work in the industry, they must have domicile status of five years in the state where they intend to work. In 2015 it was announced that Charu Khurana had become the first woman to be registered by the Cine Costume Make-Up Artist & Hair Dressers' Association.

=== Globalization ===
Feminists are also concerned about the impact of globalization on women in India. Some feminists argue that globalization has led to economic changes that have raised more social and economical challenges for women, particularly for working-class and lower-caste women. Multinational companies in India have been seen to exploit the labour of 'young, underpaid and disadvantaged women' in free trade zones and sweat shops, and use "Young lower middle class, educated women", in call centres. These women have few effective labour rights, or rights to collective action.

In addition to this, multinational corporations are seen to advertise a homogenous image of ideal women across the country is argued to cause an increase in the commodification of women's bodies. This is also manifested in the form of nationalist pride exhibited through Indian women winning international beauty pageants. According to some feminists, such developments have offered women greater sexual autonomy and more control over their bodies. However, many other feminists feel that such commodification of female bodies has only served the purpose of feeding to male fantasies.

=== Education ===
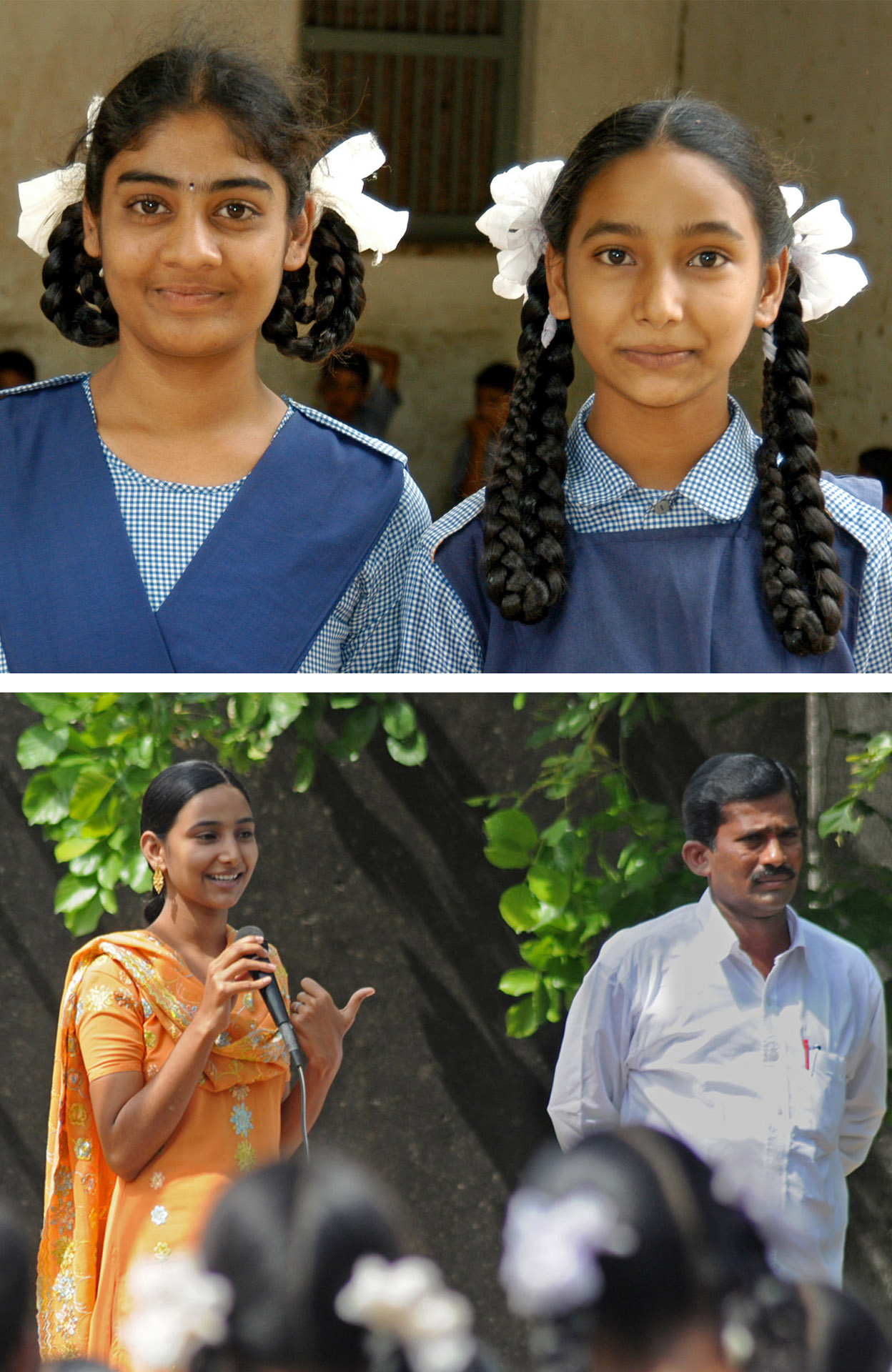
Girls in Kalleda Rural School, Andhra Pradesh.

Some of the main reasons that girls are less likely to reach optimal levels of education include the fact that girls are needed to assist their mothers at home, have been raised to believe that a life of domestic work is their destined occupation, have illiterate mothers who cannot educate their children, have an economic dependency on men, and are sometimes subject to child-marriage. Many poor families marry their daughters off early with a belief that the more she will stay at home, the more they'll be needed to invest in her. Plus it is a popular belief that they should be married off early so that they produce off-springs early in their life.

In 1986, the National Policy on Education (NPE) was created in India, and the government launched the program called Mahila Samakhya, whose focus was on the empowerment of women. The program's goal is to create a learning environment for women to realize their potential, learn to demand information and find the knowledge to take charge of their own lives. In certain areas of India, progress is being made and an increase in the enrollment of girls in schools and as teachers has begun to increase. By 2001 literacy for women had exceeded 50% of the overall female population, though these statistics were still very low compared to world standards and even male literacy within India. Efforts are still being made to improve the level of education that females receive to match that of male students.

== See also ==
- Dalit feminism
- Domestic violence in India
- Dowry system in India
- Female foeticide in India
- Feminist theology
- Gender inequality in India
- Gender pay gap in India
- Islamic feminism
- Men's rights movement in India
- National Commission for Women
- Rape in India
- Sexism in India
- Sikh feminism
- Welfare schemes for women in India
- Women in agriculture in India
- Women in Hinduism
- Women in India
- Women in Islam
- Women in Indian Armed Forces
- Women in Sikhism
- Women's Reservation Bill
- Women's suffrage in India
