= Governor Bell =

Governor Bell may refer to:

- Charles H. Bell (politician) (1823–1893), 38th Governor of New Hampshire
- Charles J. Bell (politician) (1845–1909), 50th Governor of Vermont
- Frank Bell (governor) (1840–1927), 6th Governor of Nevada
- Gawain Westray Bell (1909–1995), Governor of Northern Nigeria from 1957 to 1962
- Henry Hesketh Bell (1864–1952), Governor of the Uganda Protectorate from 1905 to 1909, Governor of the Leeward Islands from 1912 to 1916, and 21st Governor of Mauritius from 1916 to 1924
- John Bell (New Hampshire politician) (1765–1836), 12th Governor of New Hampshire
- John C. Bell Jr. (1892–1974), 33rd Governor of Pennsylvania
- John R. Bell (military officer) (fl. 1820s), Interim Governor of East Florida in 1821
- Peter Hansborough Bell (1810–1898), 3rd Governor of Texas
- Philip Bell (colonial administrator) (1590–1678), Governor of Bermuda from 1626 to 1629, Governor of Providence Island colony from 1629 to 1636, and Governor of Barbados from 1640 to 1650
- Robert Duncan Bell (1878–1953), Acting Governor of Bombay in 1937
- Samuel Bell (1770–1850), 8th Governor of New Hampshire
