= R. P. Paranjpye =

Indian academic and diplomat (1876–1966)

Sir Raghunath Paranjpye
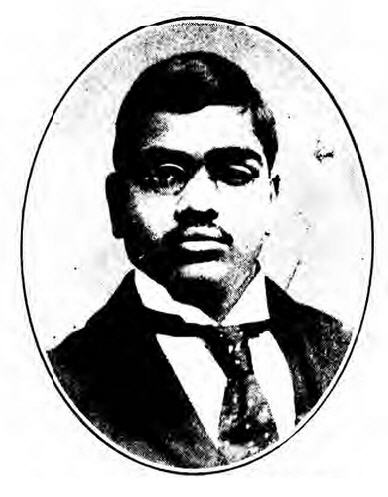
- Paranjpye in 1899

Vice Chancellor of Pune University
- In office 1956 - 1959
- Preceded by: Mukund Ramrao Jayakar
- Succeeded by: Dattatreya Gopal Karve

1st High Commissioner of India to Australia
- In office 1945 - 1947
- Preceded by: office established
- Succeeded by: Daya Singh Bedi

Vice Chancellor of Bombay University
- In office 1934 - 1941
- Preceded by: Mirza Akbar Khan
- Succeeded by: Sir Rustom Pestonji Masani

Vice Chancellor of Lucknow University
- In office 1932 - 1938
- Preceded by: Pandit Jagat Narain Mulla
- Succeeded by: Bahadur Sir Sri Muhammad Habibullah Sahib

Education Minister of the Bombay Presidency
- In office 1921 - 1923
- Preceded by: office established
- Succeeded by: Bhaskarrao Vithojirao Jadhav

Personal details
- Born: 16 February 1876
- Died: 6 May 1966 (aged 90)
- Children: Shakuntala Paranjpye
- Relatives: Hari Purushottam Paranjpye (younger brother); Sai Paranjpye (grand daughter); Ramdas Paranjpe (nephew)
- Education: Maratha High School, Mumbai; Fergusson College, Pune; St John's College, Cambridge
- Occupation: Mathematician, university administrator, diplomat
- Awards: Knight Bachelor (1942)
- Nickname: Wrangler Paranjpye

Sir Raghunath Purushottam Paranjpye (16 February 1876 – 6 May 1966) also known as Wrangler Paranjpye was an Indian mathematician and diplomat who served as the 1st High Commissioner of India to Australia from 1945 to 1947. He became the first Indian to achieve the coveted title of Senior Wrangler at the University of Cambridge. Later in life he also served as the Vice Chancellor of many Indian universities.

== Early life and education ==
Raghunath Paranjpye was born in Murdi near Dapoli on the coastal Ratnagiri district of Maharashtra to a Chitpavan Brahmin family. He was educated at Maratha high school, Bombay, Fergusson College, Pune and Bombay University before entering St John's College, Cambridge in 1896. He graduated B.A. as senior Wrangler in 1899. Paranjpye was elected a Fellow of St John's College in November 1901 and stayed as such until 1907, but returned to India to become a professor of mathematics at Fergusson College in 1902. One of the earliest Indian documentary film makers, H. S. Bhatavdekar, made silent documentary films, Return of Wrangler Paranjpye (1902) and Delhi Durbar of Lord Curzon (1903), featuring R. P.

== Career ==
In 1907, R. P. became the first librarian of the Indian Mathematical Society at Fergusson College. He became the college's principal, and stayed in that position for two decades, until 1926. Subsequently, he consecutively became the Vice-Chancellor of Bombay University and University of Lucknow In 1921, the University of Calcutta awarded him an honorary Doctor of Science degree.

Sir Raghunath was elected to the Bombay Legislative Council in 1912 representing the University of Bombay constituency. He was again elected to the enlarged Council as per the Government of India Act 1919. As part of Diarchy in Bombay Presidency, Paranjpye was appointed as the first Minister for Education and he served in the position till 1923. He was unable to get elected in the 1923 elections losing to M. R. Jayakar of the Swaraj Party.

Paranjpye received a knighthood from the colonial government in 1942. In the three years (1944–1947) preceding India's independence from the British Raj, the British government appointed him India's High Commissioner to Australia. In the days of the British Raj, there was some criticism that R. P. had often appeared on the side of British authorities at a time of nationalist ferment in India.

He was the founder of the Indian Rationalist Association in Chennai (then Madras) in 1949, and remained its President for many years. His autobiography, 84 Not Out, appeared in 1961.

Acharya Atre has devoted one full chapter in his autobiography to Wrangler Paranjpye and has written about his fame all over the country and how because of him students from outside Maharashtra came to study at Ferguson College.

== Family ==
His younger brother, Hari Purushottam Paranjpye was a well known agriculturist of his time. In 1991, the Government of India awarded R. P.'s daughter Shakuntala Paranjpye a Padma Bhushan title in recognition of her work in the field of family planning. She was also a nominated member of the Rajya Sabha in the 1960s. In 2006, the Government of India awarded R. P.'s granddaughter Sai Paranjpye a Padma Bhushan title in recognition of her artistic talents. She is a film director and a scriptwriter.

== Works ==
- Dhondo Keshav Karve: A Sketch, Poona, Arya Bhushan Press, 1915.
- Gopal Krishna Gokhale, The Aryabhushan Press, 1918.
- The Crux of the Indian Problem. Watts, 1931.
- The National Liberal Federation, Presidential address. Allahabad, 1939. Vithal Hari Barve, 1939.
- 84 Not Out, National Book Trust, New Delhi, 1961.
- Rationalism In Practice: The Kamala Lectures, Kessinger Publishing, LLC, 2006. ISBN 1-4286-4446-6.
