= Pratapsinh =

Pratapsinh is a male given name. Notable people with the name include:

- Prabhatsinh Pratapsinh Chauhan (born 1941), Indian politician
- Pratapsinh Jadhav (born 1945), Indian journalist
- Pratapsinh Mohite-Patil (1955–2015), Indian politician
