= Madhavrao Bagal =

Marathi writer (1895–1986)

Bhai Madhavrao Bagal
- Madhavrao Bagal Potrait
- Born: 28 May 1895; Kolhapur, Kolhapur State, British India
- Died: 6 March 1986 (aged 90); Kolhapur, India
- Occupations: Painter, writer, independence activist and politician
- Known for: Freedom fighter, social reformer, political activist, politician, Satyashodhak, Gandhian, Writer, Orator, Painter

Madhavrao Khanderao Bagal (28 May 1895 – 6 March 1986), also called Bhai Madhavrao Bagal, was a noted writer, artist, journalist, social reformer, political activist, orator and freedom fighter from Kolhapur.

== Early life ==
He was born on 28 May 1895 in Kolhapur to Khanderao Bagal.

His father Khanderao Bagal was a prominent pleader, tehsildar and also a social reformer. Khanderao was a leader of Satyashodhak Samaj and editor of a newspaper named "Hunter" and hence was also known as "Hunterkar".

He received his early education at the Rajaram High School, Kolhapur and later completed painting, modelling and mural decoration courses from J. J. School of Art, Bombay.

== Painter ==
Madhavrao Bagal, created his own style of painting with expressing light and shade through minimal colors. The environment created in his painting is beautiful. He has written two books namely Artists of Kolhapur and Art and Artists that talk about art and artists in Kolhapur.

== Social reformer ==
As a social reformer, he worked for up-liftment of Dalits and advocated they be allowed right to visit temple and mingling with other castes. His father was staunch Satyashodhak and Madhavrao followed his footsteps and way back in 1927, he declared that Satyashodhaks should become Socialists. He was instrumental in installation of the first ever bust/statue of emancipator Dr Babasaheb Ambedkar.

== Political activist ==
As a political activist he founded Praja Parishad in Kolhapur State in 1939 and took efforts of awaken farmers of Kolhapur and raise their voice against unjust revenues by way of agitation, in which his chief companion was Ratnappa Kumbhar and others.

In 1941, when local self-government was instituted in erstwhile Princely State of Kolhapur, the Kolhapur Municipal Corporation was put under control board of three persons — Madhavrao Bagal, Govindrao Korgaonkar and Ratnappa Kumbhar.

== Freedom fighter ==
He was among the front runner leaders, who spearheaded the agitation for independence of India and especially merger of Kolhapur State into the Union of India. He was arrested with several of his compatriots like Ratnappa Kumbhar, Dinakara Desai, Nanasaheb Jagadale, R. D. Minche and others. He joined Indian National Congress in the mid-1930s, disillusioned by pro-British politics played by older leaders of peasants movement like Bhaskarrao Jadhav, with whom Madhavrao had started agricultural co-operative societies in Kolhapur and adjoining regions. During 1940-47, he was closely working with leaders like Mahatma Gandhi, Vallabhbhai Patel, Jawaharlal Nehru.

== After independence ==
He was one of the front-runner leaders from Dhangar (Maratha) community, who jointly formed Peasants and Workers Party in year 1947 with other former congressman such as Keshavrao Jedhe of Pune, Shankarrao More of Pune, Kakasaheb Wagh of Nasik, Nana Patil of Satara, Tulsidas Jadhav of Solapur, Dajiba Desai of Belgaum, P.K.Bhapkar and Datta Deshmukh of Ahmadnagar, Vithalrao Hande and others.

== Writer ==
He is author of about 30-35 books some of which are Kalāvihāra (1966), Bahujanasamājāce śilpakāra (1966), Jīvana saṅgrāma; agara, siṃhāvalokana (1970), Sahavāsāntūna (1970), Bhāī Mādhavarāvajī, nivaḍaka lekhasaṅgraha (1998).

== Death ==
He died on 6 March 1986.

== Memorials ==
The following institutions have been named after his as memorials:-

- Madhavraoji Bagal Vidhyapeeth, Kolhapur is a University named after him.
- Bhai Madhavrao Bagal Kanya Prashala, Village Kabwada, Kolhapur District.
- Bhai Madhavrao Bagal Award is instituted by the Madhavraoji Bagal Vidhyapeeth, Kolhapur, which is given every year to an individual for outstanding contribution to the society.
