= Chatrapati Mela =

Historical fairs held in British India

Chatrapati Melas were a series of fairs organised by Marathas and non-Brahmins of Maharashtra to counter Ganpati and Shivaji Melas organised by Bal Gangadhar Tilak, a Brahmin, who in turn had organised his melas to counter Muharram processions of Shia Muslims. These melas consisted of street marches, dancing, singing and staging spun with a nationalist, anti Muslim and anti Brahmin rhetoric.

Chatrapati melas were first organised in 1922, by Keshavrao Jedhe, the images of Mahatma Gandhi, Shivaji, and Maharaja of Kolhapur were carried in the mela instead of that of Tilak. The melas criticised the construction by the Poona Municipal corporation of a statue of Tilak, which cost ₹15,000.

Chatrapati Melas asserted the masculinity of Maratha men by making attacks on the “sexual purity” of the Brahmin community and making sexual innuendos against Brahmin women and widows. Brahmins were routinely declared as “Dasiputras,” meaning “bastards” born through the union between Maratha men and Brahmin women. These attacks were made to counter the Brahminical portrayal of Marathas as Shudras and their history of concubinage of lower-caste women. Brahmins were also depicted as foreigners. The Brahmin Peshwa rule was branded as a period of “sexual debauchery.” A popular slogan of these melas was "the Chatrapati Mela has come; Brahmin women better run."

The attendees to these melas brandished swords, javelins and criticised Brahmin hegemony while advocating for a "true national patriotism of non-brahmins".
