= Dinkarrao Javalkar =

Social activist (1898–1932)

- दिनकरराव जवळकर
- Born: 1898; Alandi (Chorachi), District Pune
- Died: 1932 (age 34); Pune
- Occupations: Journalist, social activist
- Years active: 1917–1932
- Notable work: Deshache Dushman, Krantiche Ranashing

Dinkarrao Javalkar (Marathi: दिनकरराव जवळकर, 1898–1932) was a social activist and a leader of non-Brahmin movement in Bombay Presidency. He, along with Keshavrao Jedhe, first emerged as a young leader of non-Brahmin movement in Pune, and later gained state-wide reputation for his scathing critic of Bal Gangadhar Tilak and Vishnushastri Chiplunkar in his book Deshache Dushman (Enemies of the Country). Started as a principled follower of Mahatma Phule, he further turned more towards communism and worked to bring communist principles together with teachings of Satyashodhak Samaj.

== Early life ==
Jawalkar(जवळकर)was born in a Maratha peasant family in 1898 at Alandi (Chorachi) near Pune. His family owned 5-6 acres of land, which they had to sell in 1926. He got married in the same year. Without any other source of steady income, his livelihood mainly depended upon writing and patronage.

He completed his education till matriculation. Around this time, he came in contact with Shahu Maharaj of Kolhapur who got impressed by his fierce writing and oratory and asked him to come Kolhapur. At Kolhapur, he managed a newspaper Tarun Maratha (Young Maratha). He left Kolhapur in 1921 and settled at Pune. At Pune, he started working with Keshavrao Jedhe, a prominent non-Brahmin leader of his time.

== Background to Deshache Dushman ==
The Pune of early 1900s was notably divided in orthodox conservatives and reformers. The reformer faction was led by various leaders of Satyashodhak Samaj, most prominently by Shahu Maharaj, while Tilak was the leader of the conservatives. The conservatives would oppose any measures of social reforms that the reformers would try to achieve. Even after the death of Tilak in 1920 and of Shahu Maharaj in 1922, the two groups often resorted to fierce criticism of each others.

In 1924, Pune Municipality erected statues of two prominent Brahmin figures - Tilak and Chiplunkar - in the city. Against this backdrop, the non-Brahmin group proposed a statue of Mahatma Jotirao Phule to be installed at a suitable public place in the city. This proposal was vehemently opposed by the Brahmin group. B. B. Bhopatkar, a prominent Brahmin who ran a newspaper Bhala (Javelin) argued "what service Jotirao Phule rendered to Pune as to set up his public memorial? He was not a public figure but a sectarian."

== Deshache Dushman ==
All Hindus are equal. No one is superior, no one is inferior. Let all flesh and blood be one. Four varnas are a real deceit. It's a tool to keep the non-Brahmins in slavery. There is no difference among the Hindus. Hindu is the only varna. If a Hindu eats or marries with another Hindu that's not adharma. In contrast, what divide Hindus in the name of religion is not a dharma, but a trick by Brahmins. One who calls themselves a Hindu, whether they are Europeans or Africans, they are our coreligionists.

— Dinkarrao Javalkar, Deshache Dushman (1925)

Javalkar wrote his most famous work Deshache Dushman, literally Enemies of the Country in July 1925. The book was published by Keshavrao Jedhe and printed by R. N. Lad. Introduction to the book was written by Keshavrao Bagade, a non-Brahmin lawyer. The book was a blistering critic of Tilak and Chiplunkar in a tone that was intensely aggressive. Its language was fiery, sometimes even obscene. He stated that Tilak and Chiplunkar were not national heroes as they were generally considered, but indeed enemies of the country. He further stated that Brahmins desired to consolidate their power and caste superiority by dividing the masses and keeping them trapped in the fabricated ideas of superiority and inferiority by birth.

He concluded the book with an appeal to all Hindus that they should free themselves from the slavery of Brahmanism and from the chains of caste system. He stated that only those Brahmins who stop considering themselves superior and unite with the masses with flesh and blood should be considered an ally. Though he heavily criticized the Brahmin caste, he also wrote favourably about some progressive Brahmin leaders of those times - Agarkar, Gokhale, Ranade - in the book itself.

While the book was admired by certain non-Brahmin leaders like Keshav Sitaram Thackeray, it created an instant furore among the Brahmin group. In September 1925, one Shrikrishna Madhav Chiplunkar, nephew of Vishnushastri Chiplunkar filed a suit against Javalkar, Jedhe, Lad, and Bagade for defaming his family. The case was trialed before City Magistrate who gave his verdict on 15 September 1926. Javalkar and Lad were sentenced to imprisonment for one year. Jedhe and Bagade were sentenced for six months. The court also imposed monetary fine on all four of them. All of them were sent to Yerwada Jail and remained in jail until bail was achieved after two weeks.

Javalkar and others appealed in a higher court in October 1926. In the appeal, Dr. B. R. Ambedkar appeared for Javalkar and won the case resulting in acquittal of all four accused. The Deshache Dushman case was one of the first cases pleaded by Dr. Ambedkar who further went on to become an eminent jurist and first law minister of India.

Because of its pugnacious language, Deshache Dushman turned out to be a very controversial book. Javalkar tried to publish its second edition; however, by that time differences grew between Jedhe and Javalkar, and the second edition could not happen. Even after his death, the book could not be republished until 1984 and its republished copies suffered mass burning in 1991.

== Politics ==
The results of Montagu–Chelmsford Reforms in 1919 provided that seven seats would be reserved for non-Brahmin castes in Bombay presidency. During the same time, some non-Brahmin leaders whose works were previously restricted to social activities started taking part in active politics. Javalkar extensively travelled during this period. In May 1927, he along with Jedhe, toured Central Province and Berar and gave speeches at many places. The same year, he declared his support to Mahad Satyagraha by Dr. Ambedkar and also participated in burning of Manusmriti.

In 1927, British government appointed Simon Commission to consider giving more political rights to Indians. As the commission had no Indian members, the non-Brahmin party, along with Indian National Congress, decided to boycott this commission. However, there was an alternate view that held leaders of depressed communities should participate in working of the commission and press upon their issues. Dr. Ambedkar testified in front of the commission in October 1928. Javalkar decided to cooperate with the commission. This, however, created a riff between him and his long-time colleague Jedhe.

In 1927, Javalkar took upon editorship of a Marathi newspaper Kaivari from Bhaskarrao Jadhav, another non-Brahmin leader and a member of legislative assembly of Bombay Presidency. Jadhav was already opposed by Jedhe for participating in electoral politics. Collaboration with Jadhav created further differences between Jedhe and Javalkar. However, his work at Kaivari brought him to support red flag movement of mill workers at Mumbai. He actively supported the workers' union and came to an opinion that the workers should struggle equally against both British government and against capitalism.

Javalkar visited England in 1929–30 to further his cause of non-Brahmin movement. Back home in India, he was being criticized by Jedhe-led group of non-Brahmins for his alliance with Jadhav, who in turn was in collaboration with the British. His visit to England intensified his nationalist feelings and also brought him in contact with the British Communist Party. He came back to India in 1930 as a nationalist and a Marxist ready to spread socialist ideas and to form a radical anti-capitalist and nationalist peasant's movement. He also proposed that non-Brahmin party to change its caste-demonstrating name and assume Shetkari Paksha (Peasant Party) as its new name.

Javalkar continued with his writing after coming back from England. He wrote Krantiche Ranashing (The War-cry of Revolution), one of the earliest Marxist books in Marathi. In this book, he drew upon themes of Satyashodhak Samaj as a starting point and came to a conclusion that there would be no emancipation until religious bondage was broken. He strongly held that Indian peasants should come together under principles of socialism and form a peasant swaraj.

Javalkar edited a newspaper Tej for few months in 1931. His writing turned more towards socialism and their tone turned more revolutionary. In Tej, he wrote articles some radical articles like "The Raising of a Peasant Army" and "Preparations for the First War of Freedom." Here he took a clear position that three chief enemies of masses were capitalism, feudalism, and imperialism. In these three, he maintained that feudalism and imperialism were already on decline and capitalism was the primary enemy.

Javalkar had, through his writing and speeches, had created strong connect with masses of rural Maharashtra like no other communist leaders of his time. Within the non-Brahmin party, he was trying to form a group with a well-defined constitution, anti-capitalist ideology, and a new flag with a plough as its symbol.

On 16 January 1931, Javalkar was arrested for giving a speech at Azad Maidan Solapur in spite of prohibitory orders by the government. He was sentenced to imprisonment for one-and-a-half year. Though, he was released in March as a result of Gandhi–Irwin Pact.

== Death and legacy ==
Javalkar mostly remained sick after his return from England. Meanwhile, his tours and speeches were still ongoing. After his release from prison in March 1931, he visited Nagpur on invitation of the non-Brahmin movement there. He fell sick at Nagpur. On his way back, he participated in Kalaram Temple satyagraha at Nashik under the leadership of Dr. Ambedkar. At Nashik, his health deteriorated further and he returned to Pune where he saw no improvement. He died of consumption on 3 May 1932. He was survived by his wife Indutai and son Shivajirao.

Javalkar strived to create a well-organized peasant's organisation within the non-Brahmin party. Omvedt (1973) notes "though the radical peasant organisation that Javalkar projected did not come to fruition, but its beginnings were suggestive." Indeed, Peasants and Workers Party of India was formed about a decade and a half after his death by the very own non-Brahmin leaders - Keshavrao Jedhe and others - that were part of Indian National Congress during his lifetime.

== Notes and references ==
- Javalkar, Dinkarrao (2005) [First published 1925]. Deshache Dushman (in Marathi). Pune: Sumedh Prakashan.
- Omvedt, Gail (1973-04-28). "Non-Brahmans and Communists in Bombay". Economic & Political Weekly. 8 (17): 800–805. JSTOR 4362584.
- Omvedt, Gail (1993). Reinventing Revolution: New Social Movements and the Socialist Tradition in India. M. E. Sharpe. p. 21. ISBN 9780765631763.
- Nalawade, Vijay (1989). Life and Career of Keshavrao Jedhe (PhD). Kolhapur: Shivaji University. hdl:10603/138403.
- Keer, Dhananjay (2006). Dr. Babasaheb Ambedkar (in Marathi). Mumbai: Popular Prakashan. ISBN 9788171858927.
- Malage, Vasant Dattu (2012). "Growth of Non-Brahmin Movement and Party". Contribution of Sir Siddappa T Kambli in the Making of Modern Karnataka (1882-1956). Kolhapur: Shivaji University. hdl:10603/111582.
- Patil, Khaserao, Himmatrao (1996). महाराष्ट्रातील ब्राह्मणेतर चळवळ आणि दिनकरराव जवळकर - एक मूल्यमापन (in Marathi). Aurangabad: Dr. Babasaheb Ambedkar Marathwada University. hdl:10603/97806.
- Paswan, Sanjay (2002). Encyclopaedia of Dalits in India. Vol. 13. Kalpaz Publication. pp. 121–123. ISBN 9788178351285.
