= Diarchy in Bombay Presidency =

Diarchy was established in Bombay Presidency based on the recommendations of the Montague-Chelmsford report. It ended with the election in 1937 when the Government of India Act 1935 came into effect.

== Government of India Act 1919 ==
The Government of India Act 1919 enlarged the provincial legislative councils and increased the strength of elected members to be greater than that of nominated and official members. It introduced a system of dyarchy in the provinces. Although this act brought about representative government in India, the governor was empowered with overriding powers. It classified the subjects as belonging to either the Centre or the Provinces. The Governor General could override any law passed by the provincial councils. It brought about the concept of "Partial Responsible Government" in the provinces. Provincial subjects were divided into two categories - reserved and transferred. Education, sanitation, local self-government, agriculture and industries were listed as the transferred subjects. Law, finance, revenue and home affairs were the reserved subjects. The provincial council could decide the budget in so far it related to the transferred subjects. Executive machinery dealing with those subjects was placed under the direct control of provincial legislature. However, the provincial legislature and the ministers did not have any control over the reserved subjects, which came under the governor and his executive council.

== Legislative Council ==
The Council had a total of 116 members in addition to the ex - officio members of the Governor's Executive Council. Out of the 116, 86 were elected from constituencies of the presidency reserved for Non-Muhammadans, Muhammadans, Europeans, Landholders, Universities and Commerce & Industry. 7 constituencies were reserved for Marathas.

== Executive Council and Ministers ==
As per the principle of dyarchy, certain responsibilities such as agriculture, health, education, and local government, were transferred to elected ministers. However, the important portfolios like finance, police and irrigation were reserved with official members of the Governor's Executive Council.

=== Members of Executive Council ===
Portfolio	Member
Home	Maurice Hayward (1921-1926), John Ernest Buttery Hotson (1926-1931), George Arthur Thomas (1931-1933), Robert Duncan Bell (1933-1937)
Finance	Sir Henry S. Lawrence (1921-1926), Sir Chunilal Mehta (1926-1928), Govind Balvant Pradhan (1928-1933)
Revenue	Sir Ibrahim Rahimtoola (1921-1923), Sir Chunilal Mehta (1923-1925), Jean Louis Rieu (1925-1929), Walter Frank Hudson (1929-1933)
Finance & Revenue	Ghulam Hussain Hidayatullah (1933-1935), Sir Dhanjishah Bomanjee Cooper (1935-1937)
General	Chimanlal Harilal Setalvad (1921-1923), Sir Cowasji Jehangir (1923-1928), Ghulam Hussain Hidayatullah (1928-1932), Robert Duncan Bell (1932-1937)

=== Elected Ministers ===
Portfolio	Minister
Forest, Excise & Agriculture	Sir Chunilal Mehta (1921-1923), Ali Muhammad Khan Dehlavi (1923-1927), Govind Balvant Pradhan (1927-1928), Rafiuddin Ahmed (1928), Bhaskarrao Vithojirao Jadhav (1928-1930), Siddappa Totappa Kambli (1930-1937)
Education	R. P. Paranjpye (1921-1923), Bhaskarrao Vithojirao Jadhav (1923-1927), Harilal Desai (1927-1928), Rafiuddin Ahmed (1928-1932), Siddappa Totappa Kambli (1932-1937)
Local Self-Government	Ghulam Hussain Hidayatullah (1921-1928), Harilal Desai (1928-1930), Sardar Sir Rustom Jehangir Vakil (1930-1933), Sir Dhanjishah Bomanji Cooper (1933-1934), Shah Nawaz Bhutto (1934-1936) Ali Muhammad Khan Dehlavi (1936-1937)
