= Pudhari =

Marathi-language publication

Pudhari (पुढारी)

- Type: Daily newspaper
- Format: Broadsheet
- Owner(s): Dr. Yogesh Pratapsinh Jadhav
- Founder(s): Ganpatrao Jadhav
- Publisher: Pudhari Publications
- Editor-in-chief: Dr.Pratapsinh Jadhav
- Founded: 1937
- Language: Marathi
- Headquarters: Kolhapur
- Website: www.pudhari.news
- Free online archives: newspaper.pudhari.co.in

Pudhari is a popular Marathi daily, printed in three centres and distributed in Maharashtra, Goa and North Karnataka. It is the leader in Kolhapur and Western Maharashtra and the third-largest Marathi newspaper daily in the entire state of Maharashtra. Alongside Satyawadi, it is one of the two oldest surviving newspapers in the state.

Pudhari News, a Marathi news channel was launched on 29 August 2023. Its headquarters is located in Navi Mumbai, Maharashtra.

== History ==
Pudhari was founded as a weekly in 1937 and turned daily in 1939 by Ganpatrao Jadhav. Pratapsinh Jadhav followed in his footsteps. Currently, Dr. Yogesh Jadhav is the chairman and group editor of Pudhari Publications, while Dr. Pratapsinh Jadhav is the Chief Editor.

In 2016, Pudhari's publisher, Pudhari Publications, invested in new colour printing and design technologies.
