= Stri Purush Tulana =

1882 Marathi-language feminist pamphlet

Stri Purush Tulana (Hindi:स्त्रीपुरुषतुलना) (A comparison between men and women) is a pamphlet/book written by feminist activist Tarabai Shinde. Born in the Berar province of Buldhana (present day Maharashtra), Shinde was a writer who protested against patriarchy and the caste system. She was a member of the Satyashodhak Samaj and an associate of Savitribai Phule and Jyotirao Phule. The pamphlet was originally published in Marathi in 1882. The literary work critiques patriarchy as well as the gender and caste systems in 19th-century India. It is also considered the first modern feminist text in India. Shinde questions the position of women in the society and their rights.

== Description and analysis ==
Stri Purush Tulana was a reaction to a newspaper article in Pune Vaibhav, an orthodox newspaper which supported the caste and gender system. The article was written attacking a young Brahmin widow Vijayalakshmi who was sentenced for execution for aborting her illegitimate child fearing public disgrace and ostracism. The article also criticized women in general, for their changing morals and behavior. Shinde reacted firmly against this through her work. Though the book received negative views from the society, Jyotirao Phule appreciated Shinde's work and also referenced it in his magazine, 'Satsar'

Stri Purush Tulana, when published in 1882, remained virtually unknown but later became known after it was republished in 1975 by S.G Malshe.

The book starts by Shinde questioning the Gods.

Let me ask you something, Gods! You are supposed to be omnipotent and freely accessible to all. You are said to be completely impartial. What does that mean? That you have never been known to be partial. But wasn't it you who created both men and women? Then why did you grant happiness only to men and brand women with nothing but agony? Your will was done! But poor women have had to suffer for it down the ages.

The book also criticizes the caste system, patriarchy, denial of education to women, polygamy, ban on widow remarriage and many other practices which opposed women.
