= Tarabai Shinde =

Indian feminist of British India (1850-1910)

- Born: 1850; Buldhana, Berar Province, British India (now in Maharashtra, India)
- Died: 1910 (aged 59–60)
- Occupations: feminist, women's rights activist, writer
- Known for: criticising the social differences between men and women
- Notable work: Stri Purush Tulana (A Comparison Between Women and Men) (1882)

Tarabai Shinde (1850–1910) was a feminist activist who protested patriarchy and caste in 19th century India. She is known for her published work, Stri Purush Tulana ("A Comparison Between Women and Men"), originally published in Marathi in 1882. The pamphlet is a critique of caste and patriarchy, and is often considered the first modern Indian feminist text. It was very controversial for its time in challenging the Hindu religious scriptures themselves as a source of women's oppression, a view that continues to be controversial and debated today. She was a member of Satyashodhak Samaj.

== Early life and family ==
Tarabai was born in Marathi Family in the year 1850 to Bapuji Hari Shinde in Buldhana, Berar Province, in present-day Maharashtra, she was a founding member of the Satyashodhak Samaj, Pune. Her father was a radical and head clerk in the office of Deputy Commissioner of Revenues, he also published a book titled, "Hint to the Educated Natives" in 1871. There was no girls' school in the area. Tarabai was the only daughter who was taught Marathi, Sanskrit and English by her father. She also had four brothers. Tarabai's marriage was completed when she was quite young, but was granted more freedom in the household than most other Marathi wives of the time since her husband moved into her parent's home.

== Social work ==
Shinde was associate of social activists Jyotirao Phule and Savitribai Phule; both husband & wife and were a founding member of their Satyashodhak Samaj ("Truth Finding Community") organisation. The Phules shared with Shinde an awareness of the separate axes of oppression that constitute gender and caste, as well as the intermeshed nature of the two.

== "Stri Purush Tulana" ==
“I’m doing it to make you men open your eyes and take a new look at your country and have some pride in it, rather than each one of you just abandoning the dharma, habits, and customs of his own country. I’m doing it out of the hope that you might stop treating all women as though they had committed a crime and making their lives hell for it.”

— Tarabai Shinde on one of her reasons to write her work, Stri Purush Tulana

Tarabai Shinde's popular literary work is "Stri Purush Tulana". In her essay, Shinde criticised the social difference of caste, as well as the patriarchal views of other activists who saw caste as the main form of antagonism in Hindu society. According to Susie Tharu and K. Lalita, "...Stri Purush Tulana is probably the first full fledged and extant feminist argument after the poetry of the Bhakti Period. But Tarabai's work is also significant because at a time when intellectuals and activists alike were primarily concerned with the hardships of a Hindu widow's life and other easily identifiable atrocities perpetrated on women, Tarabai Shinde, apparently working in isolation, was able to broaden the scope of analysis to include the ideological fabric of patriarchal society. Women everywhere, she implies, are similarly oppressed."

Stri Purush Tulana was written in response to an article which appeared in 1881, in Pune Vaibhav, an orthodox newspaper published from Pune, about a criminal case against a young Brahmin widow, Vijayalakshmi in Surat, who had been convicted of murdering her illegitimate son for the fear of public disgrace and ostracism and sentenced to be hanged (later appealed and modified to transportation for life). Having worked with upper-caste widows who were forbidden to remarry, Shinde was well aware of incidents of widows being impregnated by relatives. The book analysed the tightrope women must walk between the "good woman" and the "prostitute". The book was printed at Shri Shivaji Press, Pune, in 1882 with 500 copies at cost nine annas, but hostile reception by contemporary society and press, meant that she did not publish again. The work however was praised by Jyotirao Phule, a prominent Marathi social reformer, who referred to Tarabai as chiranjivini (dear daughter) and recommended her pamphlet to colleagues. The work finds mention in the second issue of Satsar, the magazine of Satyashodhak Samaj, started by Jyotirao Phule in 1885, however thereafter the work remained largely unknown till 1975, when it was rediscovered and republished.

== See also ==
- Jyotirao Phule, another revolutionary who fought for the rights of women and Dalit.
- Savitribai Phule, Wife of Jyotirao Phule, and social reformer.

== Sources ==
- Shinde, Tarabai. 1882. Stri purush tulana. (Translated by Maya Pandit). In S. Tharu and K. Lalita (Eds.) "Women writing in India. 600 B.C. to the present. Volume I: 600 B.C. to the early 20th century". The City University of New York City : The Feminist Press.
- Gail Omvedt. 1995. Dalit Vision, Orient Longman
- Chakravarti, Uma and Gill, Preeti (eds). Shadow Lives: Writings on Widowhood. Kali for Women, Delhi.
- O'Hanlon, Rosalind. 2000. A Comparison Between Women and Men : Tarabai Shinde and the Critique of Gender Relations in Colonial India. Delhi, Oxford University Press, 2000, 144 p., ISBN 0-19-564736-X.
- O'Hanlon, Rosalind. 1991. Issues of Widowhood: Gender and Resistance in Colonial Western India, in Douglas Haynes and Gyan Prakash (eds) "Contesting Power. Resistance and Everyday Social Relations in South Asia", Oxford University Press, New Delhi.
- O'Hanlon, Rosalind. 1994. For the Honour of My Sister Countrywomen: Tarabai Shinde and the Critique of Gender Relations in Colonial India, Oxford University Press, Oxford.
