= H. S. Bhatavdekar =

Indian film director (1868–1958)

Harishchandra Bhatavdekar
- Born: Harishchandra Sakharam Bhatavdekar; 15 March 1868
- Died: 20 February 1958 (aged 90)
- Other name: Save Dada
- Occupation: Filmmaker
- Known for: First Indian to make a film in India
- Works: The Wrestlers; Sir Wrangler Mr. R.P. Paranjpe; Delhi Durbar of Lord Curzon

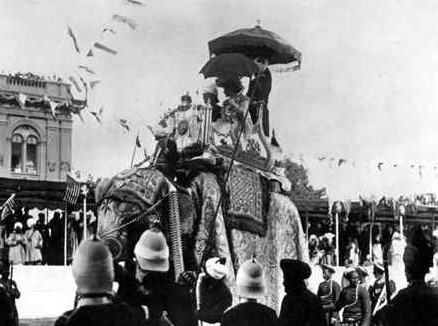
Lord and Lady Curzon on an elephant, Coronation Darbar in Delhi, 1903, News film by H. S. Bhatavdekar

Harishchandra Sakharam Bhatavdekar (15 March 1868 – 20 February 1958), also known as Save Dada, was the first Indian to make a film in India.

== Biography ==
H. S. Bhatavdekar was a resident of Mumbai (Bombay). A Maharashtrian portrait photographer by occupation, Bhatavdekar was one of the first witnesses to the Lumiere Brothers film show in 1896 in Mumbai. He soon acquired a film camera from London and a projector and went on to make some films on day-to-day life of the city as also some important events. His family name was changed to Save and his descendants live on Yari Road in Mumbai, Maharashtra.

== Filmmaking career ==
"The Wrestlers" was shot during a wrestling match in Mumbai and was the first film to be shot by an Indian.

H. S. Bhatavdekar's later films also were all reality films, with "Local Scenes...", "Sir Wrangler..." and "Delhi Darbar..." being of historical significance; since important personalities like R. P. Paranjpye can be seen landing in India from a ship; and the proceedings of the Delhi Durbar (Delhi Royal Court). Bhatavdekar also filmed Lord Curzon at the coronation of King Edward VII in Kolkata (Calcutta) in 1903. Bhatavdekar can be considered the first documentary filmmaker of India, with his films India's first newsreels.

== Filmography ==
(as a director)

- The Wrestlers (1899)
- A man and his monkeys (1899)
- Local Scenes: Landing of M. M. Bhownuggree (1901)
- Atash Behram (1901)
- Sir Wrangler Mr. R. P. Paranjpye (1901)
- Delhi Durbar of Lord Curzon (1903)
- Delhi Durbar (1903/I)
