= Kolhapur Municipal Corporation =

Local civic body in Kolhapur, Maharashtra, India

Kolhapur Municipal Corporation कोल्हापूर महानगरपालिका

Type
- Type: Municipal Corporation of the Kolhapur

History
- Founded: 12 October 1982

Leadership
- Mayor: Ruparani Nikam, BJP
- Municipal Commissioner & Administrator: Smt. K Manjulekshmi
- Deputy Mayor: Akshay Vikram Jarg, JSS

Structure
- Seats: 81
- Political groups: Government (46): BJP (26); SHS (15); NCP (4); JSS (1); Opposition (35): INC (34); SS(UBT) (1)

Elections
- Last election: 15 January 2026
- Next election: 2031

Motto
- ' बहुजन हिताय बहुजन सुखाय '

Website
- https://web.kolhapurcorporation.gov.in/

Kolhapur Municipality was established on 12 October 1954. Establishment of municipality initiated planning of modern Kolhapur city of Maharashtra state. Due to Maharashtra government anaunces the 15% growth in the municipal corporations seats there was a 92 seats from 81 seats in Kolhapur municipal corporation. Municipal Corporation mechanism in India was introduced during British Rule with formation of municipal corporation in Madras (Chennai) in 1688, later followed by municipal corporations in Bombay (Mumbai) and Calcutta (Kolkata) by 1762. Kolhapur Municipal Corporation is headed by Mayor of city and governed by Commissioner. Kolhapur Municipal Corporation has been formed with functions to improve the infrastructure of town.

== Revenue sources ==
The following are the income sources for the corporation from the Central and State Government.

=== Revenue from taxes ===
Following is the Tax related revenue for the corporation.

- Property tax.
- Profession tax.
- Entertainment tax.
- Grants from Central and State Government like Goods and Services Tax.
- Advertisement tax.

=== Revenue from non-tax sources ===
Following is the non-tax related revenue for the corporation.

- Water usage charges.
- Fees from documentation services.
- Rent received from municipal property.
- Funds from municipal bonds.

== List of Mayors ==
List of Mayor of Kolhapur City
#	Name	Term			Election	Party
1	Narayan Jadhav	16 August 1978	20 August 1979	1 year, 4 days		
2	Nanasaheb Yadav	20 August 1979	20 August 1980	1 year, 0 days		
3	Dattatrey Kanerkar	20 August 1980	25 February 1981	189 days		
4	Baburao Parkhe	6 March 1981	20 August 1981			
5	Subhash Rane	20 August 1981	20 August 1982			
6	Vilasrao Sasane	20 August 1982	20 August 1983			
7	Baliram Pawar	20 August 1983	20 August 1984			
8	Mahadev Adgule	19 March 1986	19 March 1987			
9	Ramchandra Phalke	29 March 1989	29 January 1990			
10	Raghunath Bawdekar	16 February 1990	28 March 1990			
11	Bhim Singh Rajput	28 March 1990	17 November 1990			
12	Shyamrao Shinde	16 November 1991	16 November 1992			
13	Raosaheb Pawar	16 November 1993	16 November 1994			
14	Raju Shingade	16 November 1995	16 November 1996			
15	Shivajirao Kadam	17 November 1997	17 November 1998			
16	Sunil Kadam	17 November 2000	15 October 2001			
17	Shirish Kanerkar	29 October 2001	6 April 2002			
18	Bhimrao Pawar	6 April 2002	17 August 2002			
19	Bajirao Chavan	7 March 2003	17 May 2003			
20	Marutirao Katware	17 May 2003	12 March 2004			
21	Ajit Karade	16 November 2005	16 May 2008			
22	Sagar Chavan	1 December 2009				
23	Vandana Buchade	15 November 2010	15 November 2011	1 year, 0 days		Indian National Congress
27	Sunita Raut	2 January 2014	28 July 2014	207 days		Nationalist Congress Party
28	Trupti Malvi	8 August 2014	17 June 2015	313 days		Nationalist Congress Party
29	Vaishali Dakare	4 July 2015	14 November 2015	133 days		Indian National Congress
30	Hasina Faras	25 November 2016	12 December 2017	1 year, 17 days	2015	Nationalist Congress Party
31	Swati Yavaluje	22 December 2017	15 May 2018	144 days	2015	Indian National Congress
32	Shobha Bondre	25 May 2018	26 November 2018	185 days	2015	Indian National Congress
33	Sarita More	10 December 2018	16 June 2019	188 days	2015	Nationalist Congress Party
34	Madhavi Gawandi	2 July 2019	8 November 2019	129 days	2015	Nationalist Congress Party
35	Surmanjiri Latkar	19 November 2019	30 January 2020	72 days	2015	Nationalist Congress Party
36	Nilofar Ajrekar	17 February 2020	14 November 2020	271 days	2015	Indian National Congress
–	Vacant (Commissioner's rule)	14 November 2020	6 February 2026	5 years, 84 days	–	
37	Ruparani Nikam	6 February 2026	incumbent	123 days	2026	Bharatiya Janata Party

== Municipal elections ==
The period from 1941 to 1944 was the golden period in the history of municipality. There were major changes in various fields. In the three-year election of March 1941, local self-government was established. A control board of three persons – Bhai Madhavrao Bagal, Seth Govindrao Korgaonkar, Shri Ratnappa Kumbhar – was appointed in it. Motto of this board "To reserve the society without any discrimination. There is no linking of this board to any political organization. Whatever rights are confessed by government to citizens should be utilized fully is prime duty of the board." is declared in the board's manifesto.

== Progress of corporation ==
The period from 1954 to 71 was the period of speedy growth of Kolhapur city. It is seen that the municipality moved towards corporation status during this period. It is seen from records that in 1960, there were 44 members in municipality. Out of them 37 were from general category, 3 from reserved backward category and 4 from women reserved category. The municipal working was based on administrative triangle of general body meeting, chief officer and standing committee. Engineers, health officers, account officers, supervisors, octroi and tax officers used to help chief officer. In 1956- c57, the annual income of municipality was Rs. 33,21,213 through taxes and other means, and the expenditure was Rs. 29,29,161. This indicates the growing business of municipality. During this period, a network of roads was constructed in the city. New bridges were constructed as per requirement. Water supply was made more effective. New markets and gardens were constructed to make the city more beautiful.

Effective growth in industrialization in Kolhapur resulted in starting a new industrial era, due to devoted efforts of Y. P. Pawar, Mhadba Mistri, Tatya Shinde, and late Rambhai Samani. The large area of Udyam Nagari was busy in preparing machinery and spare parts. The products from Kolhapur Industrial Estate started getting exported to several Asian and African companies. Municipality helped the growth of industry in many ways.

During this period, Shivaji University was established at the hands of Dr. Radhakrishnan in 1962. Thus, municipality helped in restructuring industry and education. In December 1972, the municipal council was dissolved.

== Era of elected body of members ==
In August 1978, the first people-elected corporation was formed in true sense. During this period, Shri Babasaheb Kasabekar (1978–79), Shri Nanasaheb Yadav, (1979–80), late Shri D. N. Kanerkar (1980), Baburao Parkhe (1980-81), Prof. Shri Subhash Rane were mayors and they contributed significantly to the development of Kolhapur city.
