= Chunilal Mehta =

Industrialist and legislator in British India

Sir Chunilal Mehta was an industrialist and legislator in British India. He was the owner of the Century Mills and served as a minister in the Bombay Presidency.

== Early life ==
Chunilal Mehta was born to Vijbhukhandas Atmaram who belonged to the Modh Vaniya community of Surat. He was the eldest of four siblings, the others being Mangaldas, Ranchordas, and Motiben.

Vijbhukhandas Atmaram Mehta came to Bombay in the mid-1800s and rose to become the owner of Century Mills. He adopted his brother's son, Purshotamdas Thakurdas who also became an industrialist.

Chunilal inherited the Century Mills from his father. He was also a director in many Tata companies. Sir Chunilal was married to Taraben and had children Kusum, Ratan, Champavati, Bhagvandas, Lily, Jaya, and Prahlad.

Sir Chunilal's daughter Kusum married Sir Harilal Kania, the first Chief Justice of India and another daughter Champavati married prominent doctor Shantilal Jamnadas Mehta.

== Career ==
Sir Chunilal Mehta became a member of the Bombay Legislative Council and was appointed as a Minister of Forest, Excise & Agriculture under the system of Diarchy in Bombay Presidency in 1921. He later became a member of the Governor's Executive Council and held the portfolios of Revenue (1923–1925) and Finance (1926–1928).

Sir Chunilal was a leader of the Indian Merchants' Chamber and also the Chancellor of the SNDT Women's University from 1926 to 1932. He was amongst the first Indians to be given membership of the Willingdon Sports Club and the Cricket Club of India. He was the Vice President of the Bombay Cricket Association from 1935 to 1937.
