= Pratapsinh Jadhav =

Indian journalist, industrialist and editor

Dr. Pratapsinh G. Jadhav
- Born: 5 November 1945 (age 80); Kolhapur, Maharashtra, India
- Occupations: Media person Industrialist; Editor (Pudhari Publications); Journalist
- Known for: Pudhari
- Parent(s): Ganpatrao Jadhav; Indiradevi
- Awards: Padma Shri

Dr. Pratapsinh Ganpatrao Jadhav is an Indian media person, journalist, industrialist and the editor of Pudhari Publications from the Indian state of Maharashtra. Born in Kolhapur to Ganpatrao Jadhav, journalist, freedom fighter and the founder of Pudhari daily, he took over the editorship of the daily in 1971 from his father. Under his leadership, the group has grown to include Jotiba Agro Farms, Pudhari Papers, Shivkashi Printers, Tulja Realty, P. G. Jhadav Investments and Mahalaxmi Softex. He had a significant role in building Siachen Hospital for the army. Previously troops could not be medically treated due to the lack of a medical facility but due to the help provided by Dr.Jadhav, soldiers are now given proper medical treatment. He contributed to the flood relief during the 2019 floods in the districts of Kolhapur and Sangli by creating his own Pudhari relief foundation. The Government of India awarded him the civilian honour of the Padma Shri in 2003.
