= Keshavrao Jedhe =

Freedom Fighter and Socialist Leader (1896–1959)

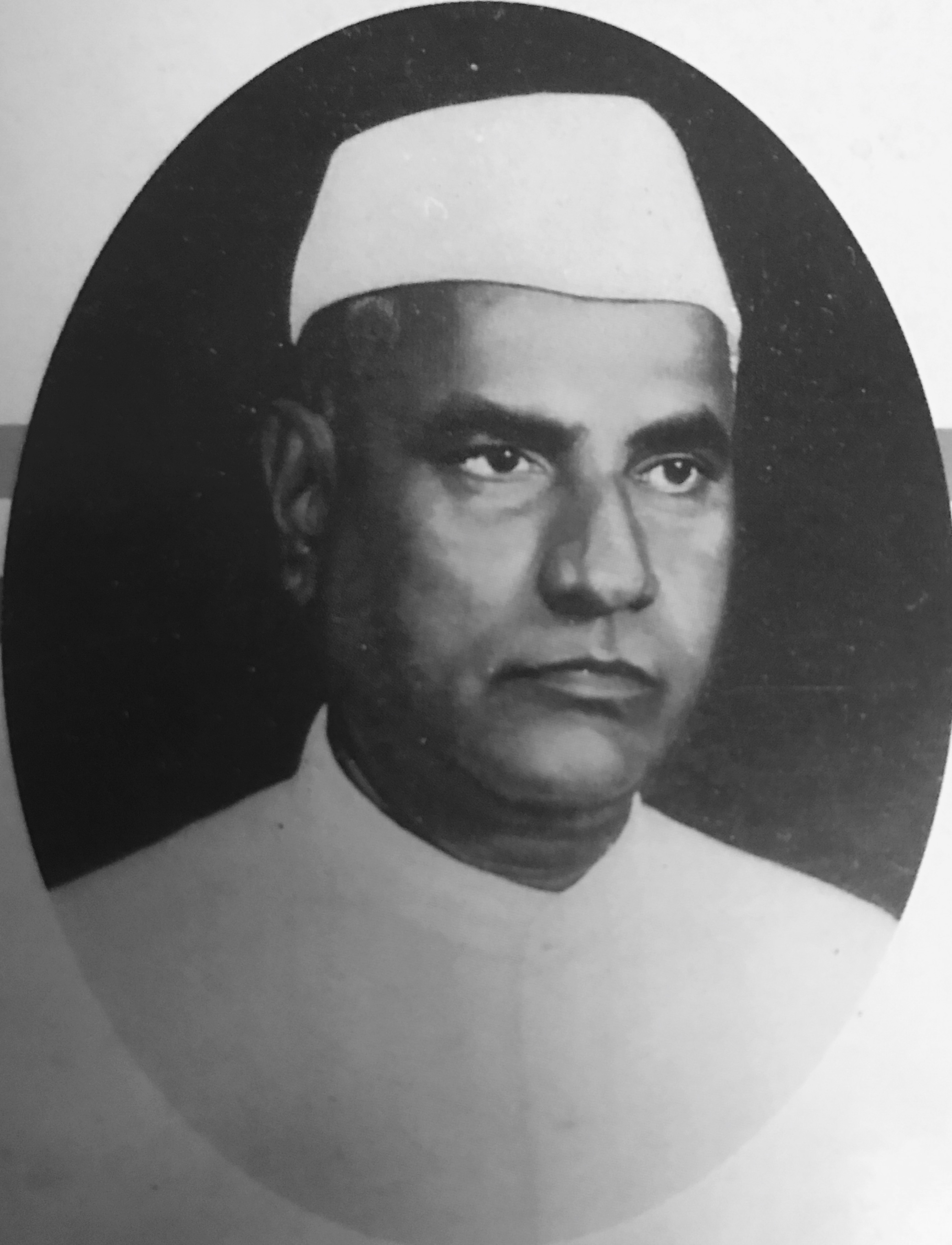
- Born: Keshavrao Marutirao Jedhe Deshmukh; 21 April 1896; Bombay Presidency, British India
- Died: 12 November 1959 (aged 63); Pune, India
- Occupations: Freedom fighter, politician, social activist
- Organization: Satyashodhak Samaj
- Known for: • Playing a prominent role in the formation of Maharashtra • Co-founding Peasants and Workers Party of India
- Political party: Peasants and Workers Party of India
- Other political affiliations: Indian National Congress
- Movement: • Non-Brahmin movement • Indian Independence Movement • Samyukta Maharashtra Movement

Keshavrao Marutirao Jedhe (né Deshmukh 21 April 1896 – 12 November 1959) was an Indian independence activist and politician from Pune. He served as a leading figure in the Indian National Congress, and in the Samyukta Maharashtra movement during the independence. The famous Swargate chowk in Pune is named after him.

== Early life and background ==
Keshavrao Jedhe was the younger son of Marutirao Jedhe. The Jedhes were a wealthy Maratha family with Deshmukh lineage from Pune. The family members belonged to the Satyashodhak Samaj and played an active part in the activities of the samaj in the early parts of 20th century. The family chiefly derived their wealth from a brass factory they owned. The factory was run by Jedhe's oldest brother, one of his brother, Baburao was active in non-Brahman movement simultaneously Keshavrao was active in Satyashodhak Samaj. Baburao was in fact, considered a close associate of Shahu, ruler of the princely state of Kolhapur.

== Political activism and career ==
=== Satyashodhak Samaj and Non-Brahman Party ===
After death of Shahu Maharaj in 1922, Jedhe assumed leadership of the non-Brahmin communities in Pune and surrounding areas under the banner of Non-Brahman party (NBM) and satyashodhak samaj. Capturing the Ganpati and Shivaji festivals from Brahmin domination were the early goals of Jedhe and his associates. They combined nationalism with anti-casteism as the party's aim. Jedhe led through the 1920s until its merger with the Congress party. spent twelve years of his life for the NBM. During this period, he served as member of Pune Municipality for NBM. He also took part in equality and untouchability removal campaigns organized by Dalit leader, Dr. Ambedkar. The Samaj and the party also conducted activities in Satara District, Kolhapur State and other places in this area that were designed to harass Brahmins, and to drive them from their positions as priests, government officials, money-lenders, and teachers in the rural areas. Prior to 1920s, the samaj opposed the Indian national movement because it was a movement led by the elites. Followers of the Samaj during 20th century in addition to Jedhe included educationalist Bhaurao Patil Nana Patil, Khanderao Bagal and Madhavrao Bagal. By the 1930s, given the mass movement nature of the Congress party under Mahatma Gandhi, Jedhe joined the Congress, and the samaj activities withered away.

=== Congress party ===
In the 1930s, Jedhe merged the non-Brahmin party with the Congress party, and transformed the Congress from an upper-caste dominated body to a more broadly based, but Maratha-dominated party in Pune and other parts of Maharashtra. He brought the Maratha community of Maharashtra into mainstream politics and won the first election in November 1934 for the Bombay Presidency legislative council.In 1938, Keshavrao became president of the state Congress and Jedhe Mansion was the centre of activity.In the early 1940s Jedhe started a peasant league within Congress which was seen by some as a challenge to the then Marathi and Gujarati Brahmin leadership of the Congress party in Bombay presidency. Jedhe was instrumental in building the Congress Bhavan in Pune.

After Independence in 1948, Jedhe left the party to become one of the founder members of Peasants and Workers Party (PWP). He fought and lost the first Lok Sabha election in 1952 from Pune as PWP candidate against his friend and Congress candidate N. V. Gadgil. Disappointed with left leaning policies of other PWP leaders, Jedhe returned to the Congress fold in August 1952. He was elected to Lok Sabha in 1957 elections from Baramati as a Congress party candidate.

Later, Yashwantrao Chavan often said he joined the Congress only because of Keshavrao.

=== Samyukta Maharashtra Movement pioneer ===
The Indian National Congress was pledged to linguistic states, but the States Re-organisation Committee recommended a bilingual state for Maharashtra-Gujarat, with Mumbai as its capital. Its inauguration on 1 November 1956, caused a great political stir and, under the leadership of Keshavrao Jedhe, an all-party meeting was held in Pune and Samyukta Maharashtra Samiti was founded on 6 February 1956. In the second general election of 1957, the Samiti defeated the stalwarts of Congress by securing 101 seats out of 133, including 12 from Mumbai. The Congress could form a government only with the support of Gujarat, Marathwada and Vidarbha. Yashwantrao Chavan became the first Chief Minister of the bi-lingual Bombay State.

S.M. Joshi, S. A. Dange, N. G. Gore and P. K. Atre fought relentlessly for Samyukta Maharashtra, even at the cost of sacrificing the lives of several people and finally succeeded in convincing Congress leaders that Maharashtra should form a separate state. The resignation of CD Deshmukh, the then Finance Minister of the Nehru Cabinet, had its salutary effect, and on 1 May 1960, the state of Maharashtra, which included western Maharashtra, Vidarbha and Marathwada was born with the blessings of Pandit Jawaharlal Nehru.

== Jedhe Mansion ==
Jedhe Mansion – second home of Maharashtra Congress Movement

Jedhe Mansion at 907, Shukrawar Peth, Pune, was houses of Keshwarao Jedhe, once the centre of political and social activities in Pune and Maharashtra during Pre and Post Independence Era. Jedhe Mansion was built by Marutrao Babaji Jedhe in 1885, Jedhe Mansion was where Keshavrao Jedhe launched his stormy battles against social norms and the political establishment of the day from the late 1920s to the 1960s. Pune was then divided into ‘western’ and ‘eastern’ parts, along geographical and sociological lines. Western Pune, represented by Kesari Wada, was dominated by Brahmins and their culture, while eastern Pune was represented by Jedhe Mansion and Keshavrao's bahujan samaj.

The Jedhe family believed in the ideology of Satyashodhak Samaj, set up by Mahatma Phule. Keshavrao's elder brothers Dadasaheb and Baburao were close associates of Shahu Maharaj of Kolhapur who was then spearheading the Satyashodhak movement. Shahu Maharaj visited Jedhe Mansion whenever he was in Pune.

In the 1920s, Jedhe Mansion emerged as a political and social school for several youths from the bahujan samaj. The Jedhe brothers lived together and the story goes that a minimum of 50 people, (not members of the Jedhe family), shared a meal at any given time. An activist of the Satyashodhak movement would head straight for Jedhe Mansion as soon as he landed in Pune. Apart from common workers, it was also home to stalwarts like Karmaveer Vitthal Ramji Shinde, Kakasaheb Gadgil, Dinkarrao Jawalkar and Karmaveer Bhaurao Patil. Leaders like Pandit Motilal Nehru, Netaji Subhash Chandra Bose, Dr Rajendra Prasad, Jayaprakash Narayan, Senapati Bapat, Bhausaheb Hire and Shankarrao Deo also visited Jedhe Mansion. Mahatma Gandhi too came to Jedhe Mansion twice.

Till 1934, Jedhe Mansion was the centre of social activities related to the Independence movement in Maharashtra. During this period, Maharashtra witnessed several controversies like Shivaji's memorial and installation of the statue of Mahatma Phule in Pune. Jedhe Mansion was where strategies were drawn up to fight the anti-social and Conservist activities. Jedhe Mansion also witnessed several meetings on the Goa Liberation Movement and the Samyukta Maharashtra agitation in 1956.
