= Robert Duncan Bell =

Scottish civil servant

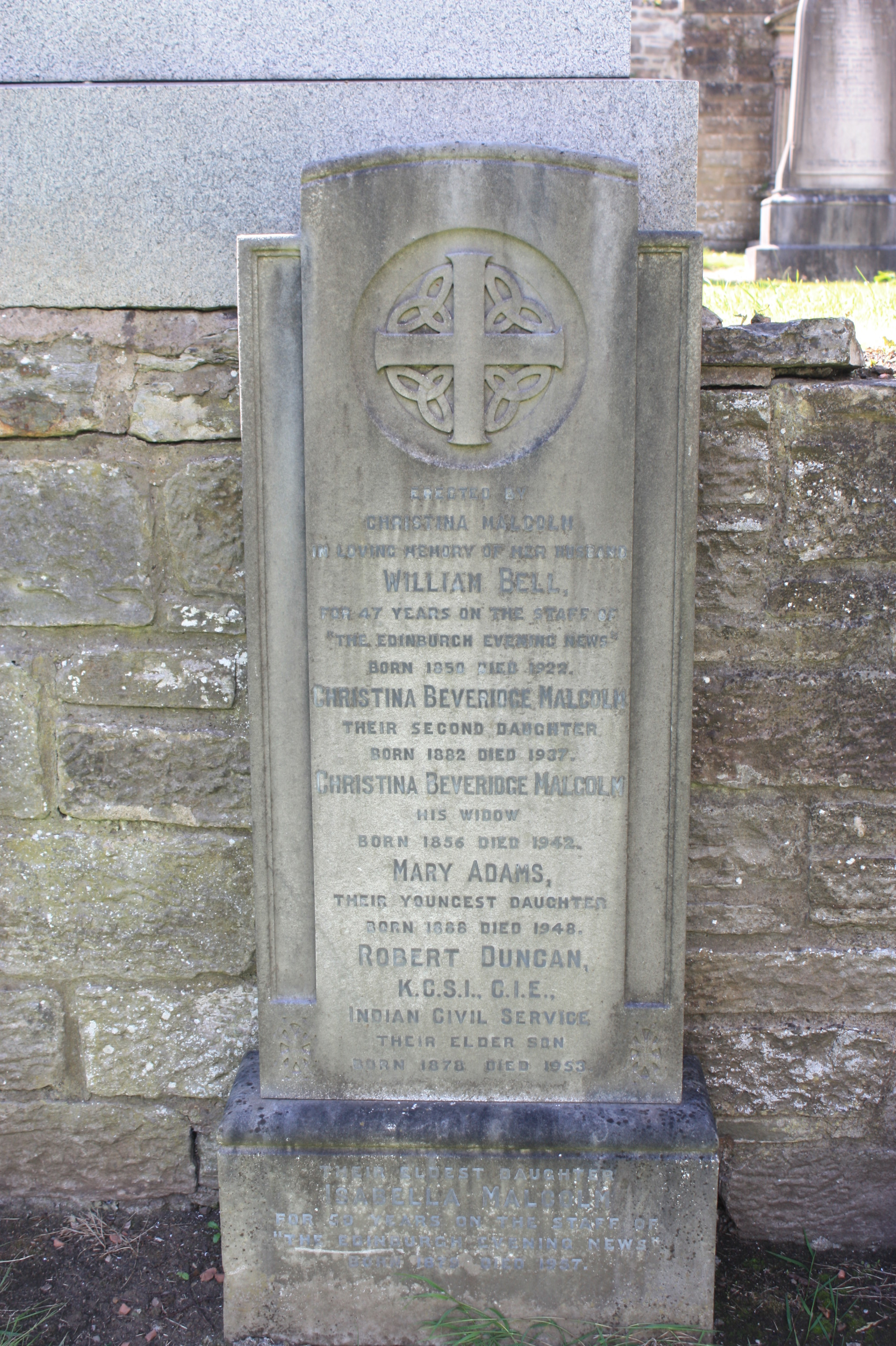
The grave of Robert Duncan Bell, Grange Cemetery, Edinburgh

Sir Robert Duncan Bell, KCSI, CIE (18 May 1878 – 14 January 1953) was a Scottish civil servant who was the Acting Governor of Bombay during the British Raj, from 30 May 1937 to 18 September 1937.

== Life ==
Bell was the son of William Bell, a typesetter with the Edinburgh Evening News, and his wife, Christina Beveridge Malcolm. The family lived at 3 Gladstone Terrace in the Grange, Edinburgh, close to The Meadows. In 1905, Bell moved to India as a junior civil servant. He was a member of the Bombay Legislative Council in the 1920s and present during the Bombay Riots of 1928/29.

Bell became Acting Governor of Bombay on 30 May 1936, after Governor Lord Brabourne went on leave with his wife, Lady Brabourne. Bell was sworn in with a 17-gun salute.

Bell is buried with his parents in Grange Cemetery in south Edinburgh. The grave lies just to the west of the north face of the central vaults.

== External ==
- "Colonial administrators and post-independence leaders in India (1616–2000)". Oxford Dictionary of National Biography (online ed.). Oxford University Press. (Subscription or UK public library membership required.)
