= Bhaskarrao Jadhav =

Indian politician

Bhaskarrao Vithojirao Jadhav

Member of Bombay Legislative Council
- Incumbent
- Assumed office 1922

Minister of Education, Bombay Presidency
- In office 1923–1926

Minister of Forest, Excise & Agriculture, Bombay Presidency
- In office 1928–1930

Member of Central Legislative Assembly
- Incumbent
- Assumed office September 1930

Personal details
- Born: 17 June 1867
- Died: 26 June 1950 (aged 83)
- Education: Wilson College, Elphinstone College, Government Law College
- Occupation: Politician, social reformer

Bhaskarrao Vithojirao Jadhav (17 June 1867 – 26 June 1950) was an Indian politician, social reformer, and leader of the Satyashodhak Samaj, Non-Brahmin movement and the co-operative movement.

== Early life ==
Bhaskarrao Vithojirao Jadhav was born on 17 June 1867 in Nagaon in a poor Maratha family. His schooling was often disturbed due to his father's frequent job changes. He finally studied at Elphinstone High School where he stood first in the matriculation examination. He was further educated at the Wilson College, Elphinstone College, and the Government Law College in Bombay. During his student days, he was influenced by the ideology of the Satyashodhak Samaj.

== Career ==
Bhaskarrao Jadhav started his career as an administrator in the Kolhapur princely state in 1895. He worked as the Superintendent or administrator of Kolhapur municipality from 1904 to 1918 and retired as Revenue Member of the State Council in 1895. He finally retired from the Kolhapur state service in 1921 to work in the Bombay Presidency.

Jadhav started the Maratha Educational Conference in 1907 and was in the Non-Brahmin movement in the Bombay Presidency since its inception. He represented the claims of the Maratha and allied Communities before the joint Parliamentary Committee in England in 1919, and secured seven reserved seats for them.

Jadhav was nominated to the Bombay Legislative Council in 1920 and became the leader of the Non-Brahmin Party in the Bombay Legislative Council. He was subsequently elected to the Council twice from Satara constituency in 1923 and 1926. Under the system of diarchy in Bombay Presidency, he served as a Minister of Education from 1923 to 1926 and Minister of Forest, Excise & Agriculture from 1928 to 1930.

Jadhav was in favour of cooperating with the Simon Commission and opposed its boycott which caused rifts in the Non-Brahmin Party. In September 1930, he was elected to the Central Legislative Assembly. He represented the Justice Party at the Round Table Conference. Jadhav lost the election to the Bombay Legislative Council in 1937.

== Social Reform ==
Bhaskarrao Jadhav was the president of the Satyashodhak Samaj from 1920 onwards.

Bhaskarrao Jadhav was also a scholar of Indian history and philosophy. He wrote scholarly articles on various topics like criticism of Ramayana, origin of the Marathas and their language, development of the Vedas, evolution of the deity Mahadeva etc.
