= Satyashodhak Samaj =

Social reform movement in India, 1873–1930s

- Formation: 24 September 1873 (153 years ago)
- Founder: Jyotirao Phule; Savitribai Phule
- Founded at: Poona, Bombay Presidency, British India (now Pune, Maharashtra, India)
- Dissolved: 1930s
- Legal status: Defunct
- Purpose: Advocating the rights of women, peasants, and Dalits
- Women's Wing President: Savitribai Phule

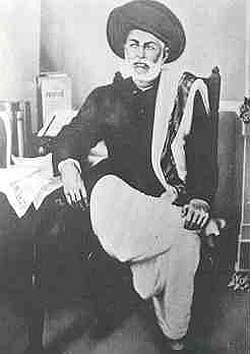
Jyotiba Phule, the founder of Satyashodhak Samaj

Satyashodhak Samaj (Truth-Seekers' Society) was a social reform society founded by Jyotiba Phule in Pune, Maharashtra, on 24 September 1873. The society endeavoured to mitigate the distress and sufferings of Dalits and women. It espoused a mission of education and increased social rights and political access for underprivileged groups, focused especially on women, peasants, and Dalits, in Maharashtra. Jyotirao's wife Savitribai was the head of women's section of the society. The Samaj disbanded during the 1930s as leaders left to join the Indian National Congress party.

== Early years ==
Phule was born into a Mali family in 1827 and was educated at a Christian missionary school. After he completed his own education, he and his wife focused on expanding educational opportunities for low caste communities. The Protestant Christian tilt of Phule's education strongly affected the theoretical underpinnings of the Satyashodhak Samaj. The Satyashodhak movement espoused a framework that could be called religious. It emphasised the equality inherent in all men, as bestowed upon them by a divine creator. It maintained faith in one God, rejected any kind of intermediary between God and man (referring here to the necessity of priests in religious rituals), and rejected the caste system. The Samaj also developed arguments against priestly social and political superiority.

Initially, Phule was attracted towards Arya Samaj, Prarthana Samaj and Poona Sarvajanik Sabha but he mistrusted them to successfully bring more rights for lower castes. This mistrust caused Phule to establish Satyashodhak Samaj. The Samaj argues that priestly dominance is not an inherent trait; rather, the varnas were manufactured in a strategic move meant to establish and protect priestly social standing. The artificial origins of the system gave low caste communities the right to contest it at the time. The Samaj insisted that, in order to reclaim their social standing, low caste groups should oppose priests as middleman between men and god in religious rituals and ceremonies. The Samaj also advocated for social changes that went against prevalent traditions, including less expensive weddings, inter-caste marriages, the end of child marriage, and the right of the widow to remarry.

The Samaj's original commitment to education and charitable activities was combined with the espousal of this anti-Brahmin rhetoric as the organisation spread across Maharashtra. The organisation attracted individuals of all castes, religions, and professions, including Brahmins, Muslims, lawyers, merchants, peasants, land-owners, agricultural laborers, Rajputs, untouchables, and government officials. Phule thought that the Samaj could uplift disadvantaged communities through collective action and organised movement, and the first step to doing so was educating low caste individuals about the misdeeds of the Brahmins. In order to spread their ideas more effectively, the Samaj published the Deenbandhu newspaper from 1877 to 1897. In addition, the Samaj emphasised the special importance of English education because it played a vital role in building occupational skills and served as the basis for the intellectual emancipation of disadvantaged groups. Phule also believed that an English education might open opportunities for employment with the British Government.

The Samaj's view of the colonial government went against nationalist groups at the time. They cultivated relations with British officials in order to seek benefits for low caste groups and saw the British government as the most likely power to offer low caste groups fair treatment. In fact, when Phule was criticised by Brahmins about his unwillingness to fight for national liberation, he responded that Shudras should expand their scope of freedom by directing their complaints to a benevolent, if misguided, British government.

== Later years ==
The Samaj's critiques of Brahminical tradition in Maharashtra formed the basis for a peasant-based mass movement against the shetji-bhatji class of intelligentsia and the moneylender-landlord. In the early 20th century, the Samaj faced difficulty in connecting with the peasant areas of Maharashtra. Finding lectures ineffective, the Samaj turned to tamashas, popular folk dramas, to communicate their messages. Satyashodhak tamashas followed the traditional format but subverted the pro-Brahmin elements of the dramas. They began with an invocation to Ganpati, a traditional deity, but added an explanation that the actual meaning of the word came from gan (people) and pati (leader). The invocation to Ganpati was therefore an invocation to the people as a source of rule. The plays continued with a discussion of Brahmin tyranny, followed by a story about the efforts of Brahmins to cheat peasants. These Satyashodhak tamashas were also used by non-brahman elites for political purposes, including as election propaganda.

Through the tamashas, the Samaj was able to connect its activities and those of non-Brahmin leaders with general peasant interests. The inculcation of Satyashodhak and non-Brahmin ideology in the peasant masses led to rebellion in some parts of Maharashtra. In Satara in 1919, tenants revolted against their Brahmin landlords in coordination with the Samaj's anti-religious ideology. The Vijayi Maratha newspaper describes the event: "Brahmin land rent had greatly soared … no profit remained to the peasants – then they decided they didn’t want such a low contract on Brahmin lands. In this way, the Satyashodhak Samaj freed them from every type of Brahmin slavery". The process of rebellion in other cities in Maharashtra took a similar shape – the Satyashodhak Samaj arrived with its ideology and its tamashas that mocked Brahmin superiority. Peasants stopped relying on Brahmins for religious ceremonies, interrupted Brahmin ceremonies, violated temples, and broke idols. Poor, low caste peasants had accepted a social ideology which argued that their status was not legitimised in any religious texts and gave them the right to revolt against their Brahmin landlords in order to achieve a better lifestyle. These peasant revolts in Maharashtra showed that the Satyashodhak Samaj's ideology was salient to common people and capable of stimulating group action.

== Criticism of the Samaj ==
While the Samaj found great allies in low caste groups as well as Brahmins, some Brahmins found Phule's efforts to be sacrilegious and anti-nationalist. They fought back against the idea of Brahmins as opportunistic invaders and greedy elites. One particular critic, Vishnushashtri Chiplunkar, argued that Brahmins had always respected lower-caste individuals. He claimed that Brahmins respected the great saints and holy men who were born into the lowest castes and elevated to positions of respect by merit. He argued that the Samaj was simply trying to expose Brahmins in an attempt to gain favor with the British colonial government and gain some small rights. To critics like Chiplunkar, the Samaj's attempts to gain social and political rights for Shudras and women by lobbying the colonial government were seen as begging India's oppressors to help them reject Hindu tradition. Many upper-caste leaders of Maharashtra disliked the Samaj's friendly relations with Christian missionaries and its appeals to the British Raj and so treated the organisation with scorn.

Some Brahmins also questioned the religious framework of the Satyashodhak Samaj, noting the Christian ties inherent in the Satyashodhak belief that all beings were granted universal rights at birth by a generous and loving creator. They argued that Phule was attempting to make a new religion, and that it seemed to lack any ethical or theological purpose. In response to his argument that Brahmins were Aryan invaders who established and enforced a religion and social system to benefit them and keep them in power, they argued that Phule did not have the authority to rewrite history. For how could he go against the writings of the Ramayana and Bhagavad Gita, and who was he to declare the truth of the alternate history he had created? Chiplunkar declared that Phule was luring his worshippers into what would ultimately be a fruitless search after truth.

== Revival under Shahu ==
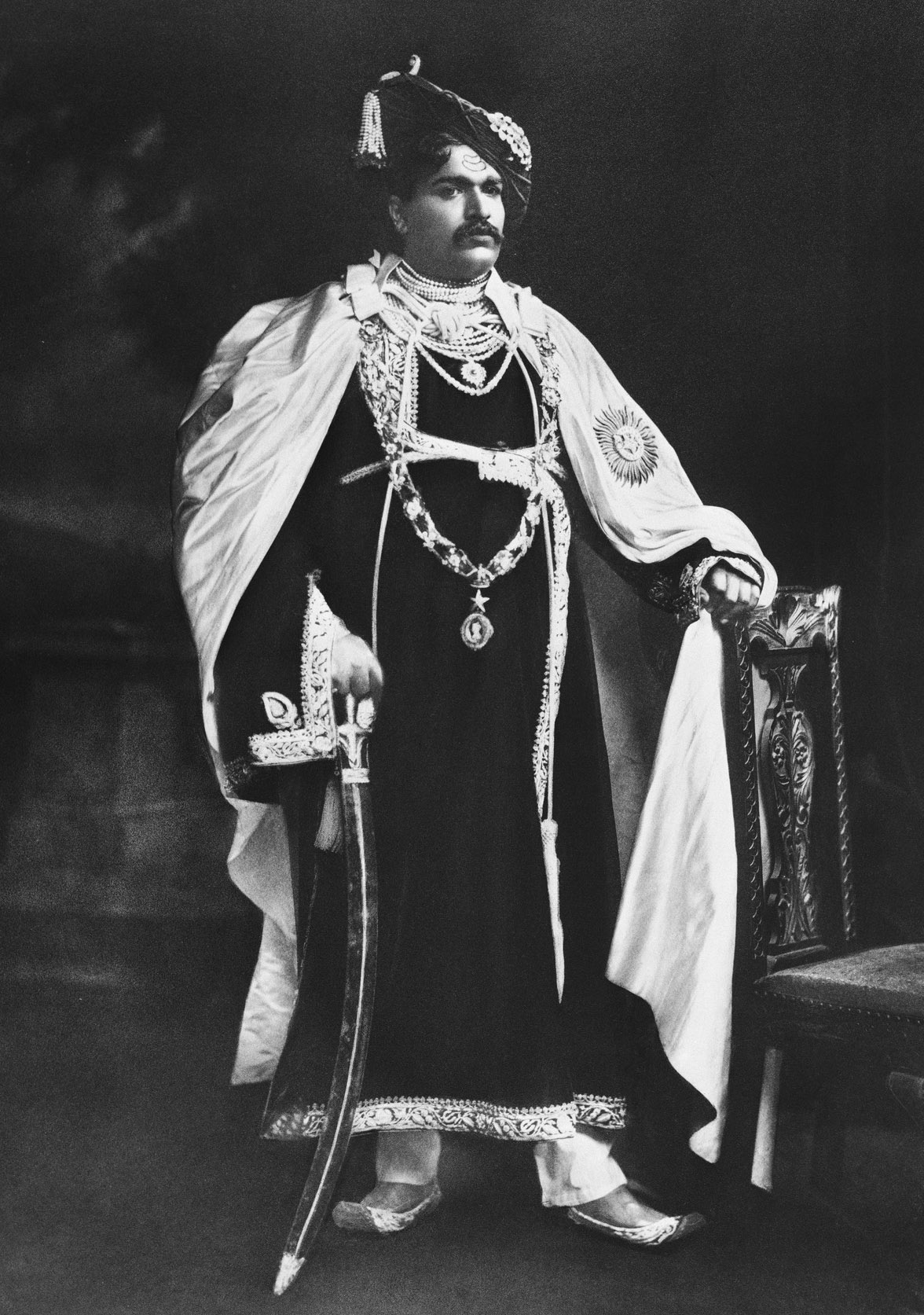
Chhatrapati Shahu who revived Samaj activities in early 20th century.

The non-Brahmin movement, that was embodied in Satyashodhak Samaj, had not made much difference to any sections of the society in the 19th century and languished after the death of Phule. However, it was revived in the early 20th century by the Maratha ruler of the princely state of Kolhapur, Shahu Maharaj. In 1902, Shahu reserved 50 percent civil service posts in Kolhapur state for all communities other than Brahmins, Prabhus (Note: Prabhus are subdivided into CKP and Pathare Prabhu.) and Parsi. He also sponsored religious ceremonies that did not need a Brahmin priest to officiate. By the 1920s, the Samaj had established strong roots among the rural masses in Western Maharashtra and Vidarbha and took a strong economic overtone in its message. At that time the organisation styled itself the representative of the Bahujan Samaj. It also defined the Brahmins, merchants and moneylenders as the oppressors of the masses. The Samaj also conducted activities in Satara district, Kolhapur State and other places in this area that were designed to harass Brahmins, and to drive them from their positions as priests, government officials, moneylenders, and teachers in the rural areas. Prior to 1920s, the Samaj opposed the Indian national movement because it was a movement led by the elites. Later followers of the Samaj during 20th century included educationalist Bhaurao Patil and Maratha leaders such as Bhau Kondaji Dumbre Patil Keshavrao Jedhe, Nana Patil, Khanderao Bagal and Madhavrao Bagal. By the 1930s, given the mass movement nature of the Indian National Congress under Mahatma Gandhi, the Samaj leaders such as Jedhe joined the Congress, and the Samaj activities withered away.

== Legacy ==
The doctrine of the Satyashodhak Samaj left a major impact on India's intellectual and political spheres, especially in relation to Indian politics. The Indian movement owed a great deal to the Satyashodhak doctrines of universal rights and equality and the Samaj's arguments against Brahmin domination of social, religious, and political life. The Indian Dalit political movement, which was separate from the non-Brahmin one (as the non-Brahmin movement did not often emphasise the particular political and social difficulties associated with the Dalit experience), continued to be affected by Phule's teachings into the early twentieth century.

== See also ==
- Arya Samaj
- Vishnushastri Krushnashastri Chiplunkar
- Shuddhi Movement
- Ramakrishna Mission
- Hindu reform movements
- Social reformers of India
- List of Hindu gurus and sants
- List of Hindu organisations
- Indian independence movement
