= List of United Kingdom locations: Mos-Mz =

The United Kingdom

This is part of the list of United Kingdom locations: a gazetteer of place names in the United Kingdom showing each place's locality and geographical coordinates.

== Mo (continued) ==
=== Mos-Moz ===
Location	Locality	Coordinates (links to map & photo sources)	OS grid reference
Mosborough	Sheffield	53.31°N 01.37°W	SK4280
Moscow	East Ayrshire	55.63°N 04.41°W	NS4840
Mose	Shropshire	52.50°N 02.36°W	SO7590
Mosedale	Cumbria	54.67°N 03.00°W	NY3532
Moseley	Birmingham	52.44°N 01.88°W	SP0883
Moseley	Wolverhampton	52.58°N 02.10°W	SO9398
Moseley	Worcestershire	52.22°N 02.27°W	SO8159
Moses Gate	Bolton	53.55°N 02.40°W	SD7306
Mosley Common	Wigan	53.50°N 02.43°W	SD7101
Moss	Argyll and Bute	56.49°N 06.94°W	NL9644
Moss	Doncaster	53.61°N 01.10°W	SE5914
Moss	Highland	56.74°N 05.79°W	NM6868
Moss	Wrexham	53.07°N 03.04°W	SJ3053
Mossbank	Shetland Islands	60.45°N 01.20°W	HU4475
Moss Bank	Cheshire	53.36°N 02.72°W	SJ5285
Moss Bank	St Helens	53.46°N 02.73°W	SJ5197
Mossbay	Cumbria	54.62°N 03.58°W	NX9827
Mossblown	South Ayrshire	55.48°N 04.53°W	NS4024
Mossbrow	Trafford	53.39°N 02.43°W	SJ7189
Mossburnford	Scottish Borders	55.43°N 02.53°W	NT6616
Mossdale	Dumfries and Galloway	55.00°N 04.09°W	NX6670
Mossedge	Cumbria	55.00°N 02.83°W	NY4768
Moss Edge (Lancaster)	Lancashire	53.93°N 02.86°W	SD4349
Moss Edge (Wyre)	Lancashire	53.88°N 02.88°W	SD4243
Moss End	Berkshire	51.44°N 00.76°W	SU8672
Moss End	Cheshire	53.29°N 02.49°W	SJ6778
Mossend	North Lanarkshire	55.81°N 03.99°W	NS7560
Mosser	Cumbria	54.60°N 03.37°W	NY1124
Mosser Mains	Cumbria	54.61°N 03.37°W	NY1125
Mossgate	Staffordshire	52.93°N 02.09°W	SJ9437
Mosshouses	Scottish Borders	55.64°N 02.74°W	NT5339
Moss Houses	Cheshire	53.22°N 02.16°W	SJ8970
Moss Lane	Cheshire	53.23°N 02.15°W	SJ9071
Mossley	Cheshire	53.14°N 02.19°W	SJ8761
Mossley	Tameside	53.50°N 02.04°W	SD9701
Mossley Brow	Tameside	53.51°N 02.04°W	SD9702
Mossley Hill	Liverpool	53.37°N 02.93°W	SJ3887
Moss Nook	Manchester	53.36°N 02.25°W	SJ8385
Moss Nook	St Helens	53.44°N 02.70°W	SJ5394
Moss of Barmuckity	Moray	57.63°N 03.27°W	NJ2461
Mosspark	City of Glasgow	55.83°N 04.33°W	NS5463
Moss Pit	Staffordshire	52.77°N 02.12°W	SJ9220
Moss-side	Highland	57.57°N 03.92°W	NH8555
Moss-side	Moray	57.53°N 02.75°W	NJ5550
Moss Side	Cumbria	54.85°N 03.26°W	NY1952
Moss Side	Knowsley	53.46°N 02.84°W	SJ4497
Moss Side (Fylde)	Lancashire	53.76°N 02.94°W	SD3830
Moss Side (South Ribble)	Lancashire	53.69°N 02.74°W	SD5122
Moss Side	Manchester	53.45°N 02.25°W	SJ8395
Moss Side	Sefton	53.52°N 02.92°W	SD3903
Moss-side of Monellie	Aberdeenshire	57.44°N 02.66°W	NJ6039
Mosstodloch	Moray	57.62°N 03.12°W	NJ3360
Mosston	Angus	56.58°N 02.75°W	NO5444
Mossy Lea	Lancashire	53.60°N 02.71°W	SD5312
Mosterton	Dorset	50.84°N 02.78°W	ST4505
Moston	Cheshire	53.22°N 02.90°W	SJ4070
Moston	Manchester	53.50°N 02.19°W	SD8701
Moston	Shropshire	52.83°N 02.65°W	SJ5626
Moston Green	Cheshire	53.14°N 02.42°W	SJ7261
Mostyn	Flintshire	53.31°N 03.27°W	SJ1580
Motcombe	Dorset	51.02°N 02.22°W	ST8425
Mothecombe	Devon	50.30°N 03.96°W	SX6047
Motherby	Cumbria	54.64°N 02.90°W	NY4228
Motherwell	North Lanarkshire	55.78°N 03.99°W	NS7556
Motspur Park	Kingston upon Thames	51.38°N 00.26°W	TQ2167
Mottingham	Bromley	51.42°N 00.02°E	TQ4172
Mottisfont	Hampshire	51.03°N 01.54°W	SU3226
Mottistone	Isle of Wight	50.64°N 01.43°W	SZ4083
Mottram in Longdendale	Tameside	53.45°N 02.01°W	SJ9995
Mottram Rise	Tameside	53.47°N 02.03°W	SJ9897
Mottram St Andrew	Cheshire	53.29°N 02.19°W	SJ8778
Mott's Green	Essex	51.82°N 00.18°E	TL5116
Mott's Mill	East Sussex	51.09°N 00.15°E	TQ5135
Mouldsworth	Cheshire	53.23°N 02.73°W	SJ5171
Moulin	Perth and Kinross	56.71°N 03.73°W	NN9459
Moul of Eswick	Shetland Islands	60.26°N 01.11°W	HU493536
Moulsecoomb	Brighton and Hove	50.83°N 00.11°W	TQ3306
Moulsford	Oxfordshire	51.54°N 01.16°W	SU5883
Moulsham	Essex	51.71°N 00.45°E	TL7005
Moulsoe	Milton Keynes	52.06°N 00.68°W	SP9041
Moulton	Cheshire	53.21°N 02.52°W	SJ6569
Moulton	Lincolnshire	52.79°N 00.07°W	TF3024
Moulton	North Yorkshire	54.42°N 01.64°W	NZ2303
Moulton	Northamptonshire	52.28°N 00.85°W	SP7866
Moulton	Suffolk	52.24°N 00.47°E	TL6964
Moulton	The Vale Of Glamorgan	51.42°N 03.33°W	ST0770
Moulton Chapel	Lincolnshire	52.74°N 00.09°W	TF2918
Moulton Eaugate	Lincolnshire	52.72°N 00.07°W	TF3016
Moulton End	North Yorkshire	54.43°N 01.58°W	NZ2703
Moulton Park	Northamptonshire	52.26°N 00.87°W	SP7764
Moulton Seas End	Lincolnshire	52.82°N 00.04°W	TF3227
Moulton St Mary	Norfolk	52.60°N 01.52°E	TG3907
Moulzie	Angus	56.87°N 03.18°W	NO2877
Mount (near Bodmin)	Cornwall	50.47°N 04.62°W	SX1467
Mount (near Perranporth)	Cornwall	50.36°N 05.12°W	SW7856
Mount	Kirklees	53.65°N 01.86°W	SE0918
Mountain	Bradford	53.76°N 01.86°W	SE0930
Mountain	Isle of Anglesey	53.30°N 04.67°W	SH2282
Mountain Air	Blaenau Gwent	51.77°N 03.23°W	SO1509
Mountain Ash	Rhondda, Cynon, Taff	51.68°N 03.39°W	ST0499
Mountain Bower	Wiltshire	51.47°N 02.28°W	ST8075
Mountain Cross	Scottish Borders	55.70°N 03.37°W	NT1446
Mountain Street	Kent	51.23°N 00.94°E	TR0652
Mount Ambrose	Cornwall	50.24°N 05.22°W	SW7043
Mount Ballan	Monmouthshire	51.59°N 02.73°W	ST4989
Mountbenger	Scottish Borders	55.51°N 03.11°W	NT3025
Mountbengerburn	Scottish Borders	55.51°N 03.09°W	NT3125
Mountblow	West Dunbartonshire	55.90°N 04.44°W	NS4771
Mount Bovers	Essex	51.58°N 00.65°E	TQ8491
Mount Bures	Essex	51.95°N 00.76°E	TL9032
Mount Charles (Lanivet)	Cornwall	50.47°N 04.76°W	SX0468
Mount Charles (St Austell)	Cornwall	50.33°N 04.78°W	SX0252
Mount Cowdown	Wiltshire	51.28°N 01.59°W	SU2854
Mount End	Essex	51.68°N 00.13°E	TL4801
Mount Ephraim	East Sussex	50.95°N 00.10°E	TQ4819
Mounters	Dorset	50.96°N 02.32°W	ST7718
Mountfield	East Sussex	50.95°N 00.46°E	TQ7320
Mountgerald	Highland	57.61°N 04.41°W	NH5661
Mount Gould	Devon	50.37°N 04.12°W	SX4955
Mount Hawke	Cornwall	50.27°N 05.21°W	SW7147
Mount Hermon	Cornwall	49.99°N 05.21°W	SW7015
Mount Hermon	Surrey	51.30°N 00.56°W	TQ0057
Mounthigh	Highland	57.63°N 04.19°W	NH6963
Mount Hill	South Gloucestershire	51.44°N 02.50°W	ST6572
Mountjoy	Cornwall	50.40°N 04.99°W	SW8760
Mount Lane	Devon	50.73°N 04.33°W	SX3595
Mountnessing	Essex	51.64°N 00.34°E	TQ6297
Mounton	Monmouthshire	51.63°N 02.70°W	ST5193
Mount Pleasant	Buckinghamshire	51.99°N 00.99°W	SP6933
Mount Pleasant	Cheshire	53.10°N 02.24°W	SJ8456
Mount Pleasant	Cornwall	50.42°N 04.81°W	SX0062
Mount Pleasant (Castle Gresley)	Derbyshire	52.75°N 01.58°W	SK2817
Mount Pleasant (Repton)	Derbyshire	52.83°N 01.54°W	SK3126
Mount Pleasant (Belper)	Derbyshire	53.02°N 01.49°W	SK3448
Mount Pleasant	Devon	50.79°N 03.15°W	ST1900
Mount Pleasant	Durham	54.70°N 01.59°W	NZ2634
Mount Pleasant (Barcombe)	East Sussex	50.92°N 00.01°E	TQ4216
Mount Pleasant (Newhaven)	East Sussex	50.79°N 00.05°E	TQ4502
Mount Pleasant	Flintshire	53.23°N 03.15°W	SJ2372
Mount Pleasant	Gateshead	54.94°N 01.59°W	NZ2661
Mount Pleasant	Hillingdon	51.59°N 00.49°W	TQ0490
Mount Pleasant	Kent	51.33°N 01.30°E	TR3065
Mount Pleasant	Kirklees	53.70°N 01.65°W	SE2323
Mount Pleasant	Merthyr Tydfil	51.67°N 03.34°W	ST0798
Mount Pleasant	Neath Port Talbot	51.64°N 03.80°W	SS7596
Mount Pleasant	Norfolk	52.50°N 00.93°E	TL9994
Mount Pleasant	Pembrokeshire	51.70°N 04.88°W	SN0105
Mount Pleasant	Shropshire	52.72°N 02.75°W	SJ4914
Mount Pleasant	Stockton-on-Tees	54.57°N 01.32°W	NZ4420
Mount Pleasant	City of Stoke-on-Trent	52.99°N 02.18°W	SJ8844
Mount Pleasant	Suffolk	52.09°N 00.52°E	TL7347
Mount Pleasant	Warwickshire	52.48°N 01.48°W	SP3587
Mount Pleasant (Redditch)	Worcestershire	52.27°N 02.00°W	SP0064
Mount Pleasant (Wychavon)	Worcestershire	52.04°N 01.94°W	SP0439
Mountpleasant	Highland	58.59°N 03.51°W	ND1268
Mount Sion	Wrexham	53.06°N 03.06°W	SJ2953
Mount Skippett	Oxfordshire	51.83°N 01.49°W	SP3515
Mountsolie	Aberdeenshire	57.62°N 02.11°W	NJ9359
Mountsorrel	Leicestershire	52.72°N 01.14°W	SK5814
Mount Sorrel	Wiltshire	51.01°N 01.95°W	SU0324
Mount Tabor	Calderdale	53.73°N 01.92°W	SE0527
Mount Vernon	City of Glasgow	55.84°N 04.15°W	NS6563
Mount Wise	Devon	50.35°N 04.18°W	SX4553
Mousa	Shetland Islands	59.99°N 01.18°W	HU458238
Mousehill	Surrey	51.16°N 00.65°W	SU9441
Mousehole	Cornwall	50.07°N 05.55°W	SW4626
Mousley End	Warwickshire	52.31°N 01.69°W	SP2169
Mouswald	Dumfries and Galloway	55.03°N 03.47°W	NY0672
Mouth Mill	Devon	51.00°N 04.43°W	SS2926
Mowbreck	Lancashire	53.79°N 02.88°W	SD4233
Mow Cop	Cheshire	53.11°N 02.22°W	SJ8557
Mowden	Darlington	54.53°N 01.59°W	NZ2615
Mowden	Essex	51.76°N 00.56°E	TL7710
Mowhaugh	Scottish Borders	55.47°N 02.30°W	NT8120
Mowmacre Hill	City of Leicester	52.66°N 01.15°W	SK5708
Mowshurst	Kent	51.20°N 00.07°E	TQ4547
Mowsley	Leicestershire	52.49°N 01.05°W	SP6489
Moxby	North Yorkshire	54.08°N 01.09°W	SE5966
Moxley	Wolverhampton	52.55°N 02.06°W	SO9695
Moy	Highland	57.38°N 04.06°W	NH7634
Moycroft	Moray	57.64°N 03.29°W	NJ2362
Moy Hall	Highland	57.38°N 04.06°W	NH7635
Moylgrove	Pembrokeshire	52.06°N 04.75°W	SN1144

== Mt ==
Location	Locality	Coordinates (links to map & photo sources)	OS grid reference
Mt Florida	City of Glasgow	55.82°N 04.25°W	NS5961

== Mu ==
Location	Locality	Coordinates (links to map & photo sources)	OS grid reference
Muasdale	Argyll and Bute	55.59°N 05.70°W	NR6740
Muchalls	Aberdeenshire	57.01°N 02.16°W	NO9092
Much Birch	Herefordshire	51.96°N 02.72°W	SO5030
Much Cowarne	Herefordshire	52.12°N 02.55°W	SO6247
Much Dewchurch	Herefordshire	51.97°N 02.75°W	SO4831
Muchelney	Somerset	51.01°N 02.81°W	ST4324
Muchelney Ham	Somerset	51.00°N 02.81°W	ST4323
Much Hadham	Hertfordshire	51.85°N 00.06°E	TL4219
Much Hoole	Lancashire	53.70°N 02.80°W	SD4723
Much Hoole Moss Houses	Lancashire	53.69°N 02.78°W	SD4822
Much Hoole Town	Lancashire	53.69°N 02.80°W	SD4722
Muchlarnick	Cornwall	50.37°N 04.51°W	SX2156
Much Marcle	Herefordshire	51.98°N 02.51°W	SO6532
Much Wenlock	Shropshire	52.58°N 02.56°W	SO6299
Muck	Highland	56.83°N 06.23°W	NM417795
Mucking	Essex	51.50°N 00.41°E	TQ6881
Muckle Flugga	Shetland Islands	60.85°N 00.88°W	HP609198
Muckleford	Dorset	50.73°N 02.51°W	SY6493
Muckle Green Holm	Orkney Islands	59.13°N 02.83°W	HY525273
Muckle Holm	Shetland Islands	60.57°N 01.26°W	HU402886
Muckle Ossa	Shetland Islands	60.54°N 01.60°W	HU217846
Muckle Roe	Shetland Islands	60.37°N 01.42°W	HU319654
Muckle Skerry	Orkney Islands	58.68°N 02.92°W	ND462782
Mucklestone	Staffordshire	52.93°N 02.41°W	SJ7237
Muckleton	Norfolk	52.91°N 00.69°E	TF8139
Muckleton	Shropshire	52.78°N 02.60°W	SJ5921
Muckley	Shropshire	52.55°N 02.53°W	SO6495
Muckley Corner	Staffordshire	52.65°N 01.88°W	SK0806
Muckley Cross	Shropshire	52.55°N 02.53°W	SO6495
Muckton	Lincolnshire	53.30°N 00.05°E	TF3781
Muckton Bottom	Lincolnshire	53.31°N 00.04°E	TF3682
Mudd	Tameside	53.44°N 02.01°W	SJ9994
Muddiford	Devon	51.12°N 04.05°W	SS5638
Muddlebridge	Devon	51.06°N 04.11°W	SS5232
Muddles Green	East Sussex	50.89°N 00.18°E	TQ5413
Mudeford	Dorset	50.72°N 01.74°W	SZ1892
Mudford	Somerset	50.96°N 02.61°W	ST5719
Mudford Sock	Somerset	50.96°N 02.64°W	ST5519
Mudgley	Somerset	51.20°N 02.80°W	ST4445
Mugdock	Stirling	55.95°N 04.32°W	NS5576
Mugeary	Highland	57.36°N 06.25°W	NG4438
Mugginton	Derbyshire	52.98°N 01.58°W	SK2843
Muggintonlane End	Derbyshire	52.99°N 01.58°W	SK2844
Muggleswick	Durham	54.84°N 01.93°W	NZ0450
Mugswell	Surrey	51.27°N 00.19°W	TQ2654
Muie	Highland	58.00°N 04.25°W	NC6704
Muir	Aberdeenshire	56.98°N 03.54°W	NO0689
Muircleugh	Scottish Borders	55.69°N 02.78°W	NT5145
Muirdrum	Angus	56.52°N 02.71°W	NO5637
Muiredge	Fife	56.17°N 03.04°W	NT3598
Muirend	City of Glasgow	55.81°N 04.28°W	NS5760
Muirhead	Angus	56.49°N 03.07°W	NO3434
Muirhead	Fife	56.23°N 03.16°W	NO2805
Muirhead	North Lanarkshire	55.89°N 04.11°W	NS6869
Muirhead	South Ayrshire	55.54°N 04.64°W	NS3331
Muirhouse	City of Edinburgh	55.97°N 03.26°W	NT2176
Muirhouse	North Lanarkshire	55.77°N 03.97°W	NS7655
Muirhouses	Angus	56.69°N 02.99°W	NO3956
Muirhouses	Falkirk	56.00°N 03.58°W	NT0180
Muirhouses	Perth and Kinross	56.40°N 03.18°W	NO2724
Muirkirk	East Ayrshire	55.51°N 04.07°W	NS6927
Muir of Alford	Aberdeenshire	57.22°N 02.76°W	NJ5415
Muir of Fowlis	Aberdeenshire	57.19°N 02.72°W	NJ5612
Muir of Lochs	Moray	57.64°N 03.17°W	NJ3062
Muir of Ord	Highland	57.51°N 04.47°W	NH5250
Muir of Pert	Angus	56.51°N 02.96°W	NO4136
Muir of Tarradale	Highland	57.51°N 04.43°W	NH5450
Muirshearlich	Highland	56.87°N 05.07°W	NN1380
Muirtack	Aberdeenshire	57.42°N 02.01°W	NJ9937
Muirton (Perth)	Perth and Kinross	56.40°N 03.46°W	NO1025
Muirton (near Auchterarder)	Perth and Kinross	56.27°N 03.74°W	NN9211
Muirton of Ardblair	Perth and Kinross	56.57°N 03.36°W	NO1643
Muker	North Yorkshire	54.36°N 02.15°W	SD9097
Mulbarton	Norfolk	52.55°N 01.22°E	TG1900
Mulben	Moray	57.53°N 03.08°W	NJ3550
Mulberry	Cornwall	50.45°N 04.79°W	SX0265
Muldoanich	Western Isles	56.91°N 07.44°W	NL689938
Mulfra	Cornwall	50.15°N 05.57°W	SW4534
Mullach Charlabhaigh	Western Isles	58.28°N 06.77°W	NB2043
Mullenspond	Hampshire	51.20°N 01.58°W	SU2945
Mull Head (Papa Westray)	Orkney Islands	59.38°N 02.88°W	HY499553
Mull Head (Deerness)	Orkney Islands	58.96°N 02.72°W	HY586091
Mullion	Cornwall	50.02°N 05.25°W	SW6719
Mullion Cove	Cornwall	50.00°N 05.26°W	SW6617
Mull of Galloway	Dumfries and Galloway	54.63°N 04.87°W	NX147306
Mull of Kintyre	Argyll and Bute	55.29°N 05.77°W	NR604070
Mull of Logan	Dumfries and Galloway	54.73°N 04.98°W	NX082421
Mull of Oa	Argyll and Bute	55.59°N 06.33°W	NR273418
Mumbles Head	Swansea	51.56°N 03.98°W	SS628873
Mumbles Hill	Swansea	51.56°N 03.99°W	SS6287
Mumby	Lincolnshire	53.24°N 00.26°E	TF5174
Mumps	Oldham	53.54°N 02.10°W	SD9305
Munderfield Row	Herefordshire	52.15°N 02.52°W	SO6451
Munderfield Stocks	Herefordshire	52.14°N 02.51°W	SO6550
Mundesley	Norfolk	52.87°N 01.43°E	TG3136
Mundford	Norfolk	52.50°N 00.65°E	TL8093
Mundham	Norfolk	52.53°N 01.43°E	TM3398
Mundon	Essex	51.68°N 00.70°E	TL8702
Mundy Bois	Kent	51.17°N 00.71°E	TQ9045
Muness	Shetland Islands	60.68°N 00.84°W	HP6301
Mungrisdale	Cumbria	54.66°N 02.99°W	NY3630
Munlochy	Highland	57.54°N 04.27°W	NH6453
Munsley	Herefordshire	52.05°N 02.49°W	SO6640
Munslow	Shropshire	52.47°N 02.70°W	SO5287
Munstone	Herefordshire	52.07°N 02.71°W	SO5142
Murch	The Vale Of Glamorgan	51.43°N 03.20°W	ST1671
Murchington	Devon	50.67°N 03.86°W	SX6888
Murcot	Worcestershire	52.05°N 01.91°W	SP0640
Murcott	Oxfordshire	51.83°N 01.15°W	SP5815
Murcott	Wiltshire	51.61°N 02.07°W	ST9591
Murdieston	Stirling	56.15°N 04.14°W	NS6798
Murdishaw	Cheshire	53.31°N 02.67°W	SJ5580
Murieston	West Lothian	55.86°N 03.50°W	NT0664
Murrayfield	City of Edinburgh	55.94°N 03.26°W	NT2173
Murraythwaite	Dumfries and Galloway	55.03°N 03.37°W	NY1272
Murrell Green	Hampshire	51.28°N 00.94°W	SU7455
Murrell's End (Hartpury)	Gloucestershire	51.89°N 02.32°W	SO7822
Murrell's End (Redmarley D'Abitot)	Gloucestershire	51.96°N 02.37°W	SO7430
Murroes	Angus	56.50°N 02.87°W	NO4635
Murrow	Cambridgeshire	52.64°N 00.02°E	TF3707
Mursley	Buckinghamshire	51.94°N 00.82°W	SP8128
Murston	Kent	51.34°N 00.75°E	TQ9264
Murthly	Perth and Kinross	56.52°N 03.48°W	NO0938
Murton	Cumbria	54.58°N 02.43°W	NY7221
Murton	Durham	54.81°N 01.39°W	NZ3947
Murton	North Tyneside	55.02°N 01.50°W	NZ3270
Murton	Swansea	51.58°N 04.05°W	SS5889
Murton	York	53.96°N 01.01°W	SE6552
Murton Grange	North Yorkshire	54.28°N 01.18°W	SE5388
Murtwell	Devon	50.39°N 03.76°W	SX7556
Musbury	Devon	50.74°N 03.03°W	SY2794
Muscliff	Bournemouth	50.75°N 01.87°W	SZ0995
Muscoates	North Yorkshire	54.21°N 00.95°W	SE6880
Muscott	Northamptonshire	52.26°N 01.09°W	SP6263
Mushroom Green	Dudley	52.47°N 02.10°W	SO9386
Musselburgh	East Lothian	55.94°N 03.04°W	NT3573
Musselwick	Pembrokeshire	51.71°N 05.17°W	SM8106
Mustard Hyrn	Norfolk	52.70°N 01.61°E	TG4418
Muston	Leicestershire	52.92°N 00.78°W	SK8237
Muston	North Yorkshire	54.19°N 00.33°W	TA0979
Mustow Green	Worcestershire	52.36°N 02.20°W	SO8674
Muswell Hill	Haringey	51.59°N 00.15°W	TQ2890
Mutehill	Dumfries and Galloway	54.80°N 04.05°W	NX6848
Mutford	Suffolk	52.43°N 01.64°E	TM4888
Muthill	Perth and Kinross	56.32°N 03.84°W	NN8616
Mutley	Devon	50.37°N 04.13°W	SX4855
Mutterton	Devon	50.83°N 03.37°W	ST0305
Mutton Hall	East Sussex	50.96°N 00.24°E	TQ5821
Muxton	Shropshire	52.72°N 02.43°W	SJ7114

== Mw ==
Location	Locality	Coordinates (links to map & photo sources)	OS grid reference
Mwdwl-eithin	Flintshire	53.27°N 03.26°W	SJ1676
Mwynbwll	Flintshire	53.19°N 03.22°W	SJ1867

== My ==
Location	Locality	Coordinates (links to map & photo sources)	OS grid reference
Mybster	Highland	58.44°N 03.44°W	ND1652
Myddfai	Carmarthenshire	51.95°N 03.79°W	SN7730
Myddle	Shropshire	52.80°N 02.78°W	SJ4723
Myddlewood	Shropshire	52.80°N 02.81°W	SJ4523
Myddyn-fych	Carmarthenshire	51.79°N 04.00°W	SN6213
Mydroilyn	Ceredigion	52.17°N 04.26°W	SN4555
Myerscough Smithy	Lancashire	53.77°N 02.59°W	SD6131
Mylor Bridge	Cornwall	50.18°N 05.08°W	SW8036
Mylor Churchtown	Cornwall	50.17°N 05.05°W	SW8235
Mynachdy	Cardiff	51.49°N 03.21°W	ST1678
Mynachdy	Rhondda, Cynon, Taff	51.64°N 03.38°W	ST0495
Mynachlog-ddu	Pembrokeshire	51.93°N 04.70°W	SN1430
Mynd	Shropshire	52.36°N 02.95°W	SO3574
Myndd Llandygai	Gwynedd	53.16°N 04.09°W	SH6065
Myndtown	Shropshire	52.49°N 02.90°W	SO3989
Mynydd Bach	Ceredigion	52.36°N 03.89°W	SN7176
Mynydd-bach	Monmouthshire	51.64°N 02.75°W	ST4894
Mynydd-Bach	Swansea	51.65°N 03.95°W	SS6597
Mynydd-bach-y-glo	Swansea	51.63°N 04.01°W	SS6195
Mynydd Bodafon	Isle of Anglesey	53.33°N 04.31°W	SH4685
Mynydd Gilan	Gwynedd	52.78°N 04.53°W	SH2924
Mynydd Isa	Flintshire	53.16°N 03.12°W	SJ2564
Mynyddislwyn	Caerphilly	51.63°N 03.17°W	ST1994
Mynydd-llan	Flintshire	53.23°N 03.27°W	SJ1572
Mynydd Marian	Conwy	53.27°N 03.66°W	SH8977
Mynydd Mechell	Isle of Anglesey	53.37°N 04.48°W	SH3589
Mynyddygarreg	Carmarthenshire	51.74°N 04.29°W	SN4208
Mynytho	Gwynedd	52.84°N 04.52°W	SH3030
Myrelandhorn	Highland	58.50°N 03.23°W	ND2858
Myrtle Hill	Carmarthenshire	51.95°N 03.80°W	SN7630
Mytchett	Surrey	51.28°N 00.73°W	SU8855
Mytchett Place	Surrey	51.27°N 00.72°W	SU8954
Mytholm	Calderdale	53.73°N 02.03°W	SD9827
Mytholmes	Bradford	53.83°N 01.95°W	SE0338
Mytholmroyd	Calderdale	53.73°N 01.98°W	SE0126
Mythop	Lancashire	53.79°N 02.97°W	SD3634
Myton	Warwickshire	52.27°N 01.56°W	SP3064
Myton Hall	North Yorkshire	54.08°N 01.32°W	SE4466
Myton-on-Swale	North Yorkshire	54.08°N 01.34°W	SE4366
Mytton	Shropshire	52.74°N 02.83°W	SJ4417
