= Mount Hermon (disambiguation) =

Mount Hermon is a high mountain on the border between Israel, Syria and Lebanon. The name may also refer to:

== Places ==
=== In the United States ===
- Mount Hermon, California
- Mount Hermon, Kentucky
- Mount Hermon, Louisiana
- Mount Hermon, Massachusetts
- Mount Hermon, New Jersey
- Mount Hermon, Alamance County, North Carolina
- Mount Hermon Township, Pasquotank County, North Carolina
- Mount Hermon, Virginia

=== Elsewhere ===
- Mount Hermon, Cornwall, a hamlet in England

== Schools ==
- Northfield Mount Hermon School, a private, college-preparatory school in Massachusetts, United States
- Mount Hermon Female Seminary, Mississippi, a former institution of higher education for black women (1875-1924)
- Mount Hermon High School, a high school in Mount Hermon, Louisiana, United States
- Mount Hermon School, Darjeeling, India

== Battles ==
- First Battle of Mount Hermon, fought on October 6, 1973
- Second Battle of Mount Hermon, fought on October 8, 1973
- Third Battle of Mount Hermon (Operation Dessert), fought on October 21–22, 1973

== Other uses ==
- Mount Hermon field mouse, rodent species
- Mount Hermon Cemetery, Sillery, Quebec City, Canada
