= List of battles of the Yom Kippur War =

This is a list of land, naval, and aerial battles of the Yom Kippur War (6-25 October 1973).

Date	Battle	Campaign	Arab forces	Israel	Outcome
6-8 October 1973	Operation Badr	Suez Canal - East	Egypt	Israel	Egyptian victory
6 October 1973	Battle of Lahtzanit	Suez Canal - East	Egypt	Israel	Egyptian victory
6 October 1973	Battle of Port Tawfik	Sinai	Egypt	Israel	Egyptian victory
6 October 1973	First Egyptian Air Strike	Sinai	Egypt	Israel	Inconclusive
6 October 1973	Battle of Budapest	Suez Canal - East	Egypt	Israel	Israeli victory
7-8 October 1973	Battle of Qantara	Suez Canal - East	Egypt	Israel	Egyptian victory
6-7 October 1973	Battle of Oracle	Suez Canal - East	Egypt	Israel	Egyptian victory
7-8 October 1973	Battle of El Ferdan	El Ferdan Sector, East of Ismailia	Egypt	Israel	Egyptian victory
7-8 October 1973	Israeli Counterattack on October 8	Sinai	Egypt	Israel	Egyptian victory
6-9 October 1973	Battle of Putzer	Suez Canal - East	Egypt	Israel	Egyptian victory
6 October 1973	Battle of Ofira	Aerial	Egypt	Israel	Israeli victory
6-7 October 1973	Battle of Jabal Essheikh	Golan	Syria	Israel	Syrian victory
6-9 October 1973	Battle of the Valley of Tears	Golan	Syria	Israel	Israeli victory
6-8 October 1973	Battle of Tel Saki	Golan	Syria	Israel	Israeli victory
6-9 October 1973	Battle of Naffakh	Golan	Syria	Israel	Israeli victory
7 October 1973	Battle of Model 5	Aerial	Syria	Israel	Syrian victory
7 October 1973	Battle of Romani	Suez Canal - East	Egypt	Israel	Israeli victory
7 October 1973	Battle of Marsa Talamat	Naval	Egypt	Israel	Israeli victory
7 October 1973	Tagar	Aerial	Egypt	Israel	Inconclusive
7 October 1973	Battle of Latakia	Naval	Syria	Israel	Israeli victory
7-10 October 1973	Battle of Tel Fares	Golan	Syria	Israel	Israeli victory
8–9 October 1973	Battle of Baltim	Naval	Egypt	Israel	Israeli victory
8 October 1973	Battle of Jabal Essheikh	Golan	Syria	Israel	Syrian victory
8 October 1973	Battle of Tabat al-Shajara	Tabat al-Shajara in Sinai	Egypt	Israel	Egyptian victory
9 October 1973	Syrian GHQ raid	Aerial	Syria	Israel	Israeli victory
8-10 October 1973	Air battle of Port Said	Port Said	Egypt	Israel	Egyptian victory
11 October 1973	Battle of Latakia	Naval	Syria	Israel	Syrian victory
11 October 1973	Battle of Khan Arnaba	Bashan	Syria	Israel	Israeli victory
11-12 October 1973	Battle of Beit Jinn	Bashan	Syria	Israel	Israeli victory
11-12 October 1973	Battle of Tel Shams	Bashan	Syria	Israel	Israeli victory
12 October 1973	Gown	Aerial	Syria	Israel	Israeli victory
13-14 October 1973	Battle of Mashara	Bashan	Syria; Iraq Jordan	Israel	Israeli victory
13 October 1973	Mezzeh Raid	Aerial	Syria	Israel	Israeli victory
14 October 1973	Battle of the Sinai	Sinai	Egypt	Israel	Israeli victory
14 October 1973	Air battle of Mansoura	Nile Delta	Egypt	Israel	Egyptian victory
14-15 October 1973	Battle of Wadi Mabouk	Sinai	Egypt	Israel	Israeli victory
15-17 October 1973	Battle of the Chinese Farm	Sinai	Egypt	Israel	Israeli victory
16 October 1973	Missile base raid	Aerial	Egypt	Israel	Israeli victory
17 October 1973	Battle of the 25th Brigade	Suez Canal - East	Egypt	Israel	Israeli victory
17 October 1973	Battle of Serapeum	Serapeum Village	Egypt	Israel	Egyptian victory
19 October 1973	Battle of Kafr Nasij	Bashan	Syria	Israel	Israeli victory
21-22 October 1973	Battle of Jabal Essheikh	Golan-Bashan	Syria	Israel	Israeli victory
18-22 October 1973	Battle of Ismailia	Suez Canal - West	Egypt	Israel	Egyptian victory
22 October 1973	October 22 Scud missile attack	Israeli Army bridgehead at Deversoir	Egypt	Israel	Egyptian victory
24-25 October 1973	Battle of Suez	Suez Canal - West	Egypt	Israel	Egyptian victory
