= Battle of Mount Hermon =

Battle of Mount Hermon may refer to:

- First Battle of Mount Hermon, fought on October 6, 1973
- Second Battle of Mount Hermon, fought on October 8, 1973
- Third Battle of Mount Hermon (Operation Dessert), fought on October 21–22, 1973
