= Muirhead =

Muirhead may refer to:

== People ==
- Muirhead (surname)
- Muirhead Bone (1876–1953), Scottish artist
- Muirhead Collins (1852-1927), English-born Royal Navy officer, colonial Australian naval officer and public servant, and Australian federationist

== Places ==
- Muirhead, Angus, a village near Dundee, Scotland
- Muirhead, Fife, a location in Scotland
- Muirhead, New Jersey, an unincorporated community in the USA
- Muirhead, North Lanarkshire, a village near Chryston, Scotland
- Muirhead, Northern Territory, a suburb of Darwin, Australia
- Muirhead, South Ayrshire, a location in Scotland
- 7818 Muirhead (1990 QO), an asteroid

== See also ==
- Head of Muir, a small village near Falkirk, Scotland
- Muirhead's inequality in mathematics, named after Robert Franklin Muirhead
- Muirhead Library of Philosophy, a series of philosophical publications named after J H Muirhead
- Moorehead, a surname
- Reddingmuirhead, a small village near Falkirk, Scotland
