= Moston =

Moston may refer to:

- Moston, Cheshire East, Cheshire, a civil parish west of Sandbach
- Moston, Cheshire West and Chester, Cheshire, a civil parish north of Chester
- Moston, Manchester, a suburb in the city of Manchester, England
  - Moston railway station
- Moston, Shropshire, a rural hamlet in Shropshire, England
- Moston Brook, a stream in Greater Manchester
- New Moston, a district in the City of Manchester
