= Mumbles Hill =

Hill in Wales

Coordinates: 51.5688°N 3.9852°W

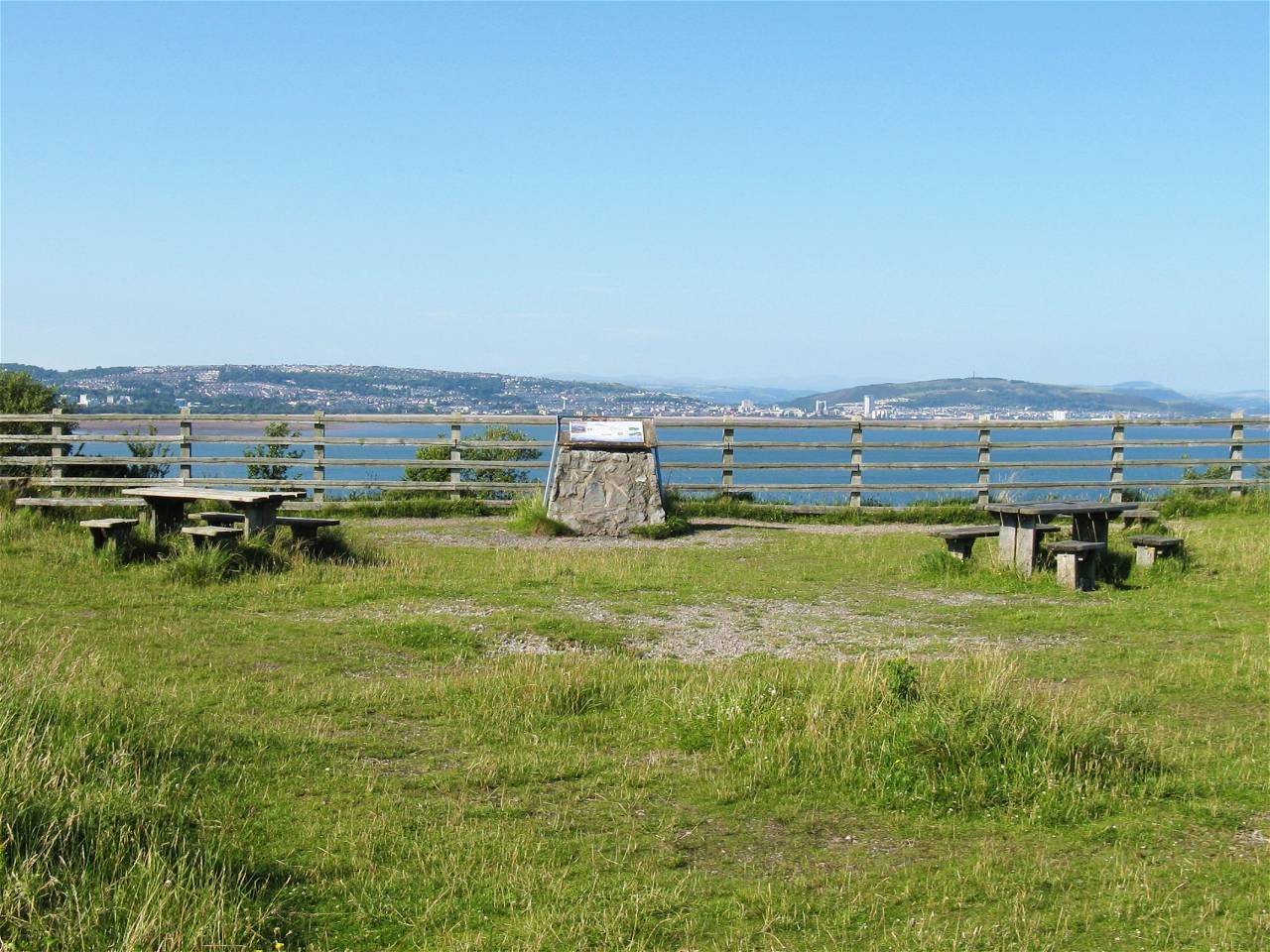
Viewpoint and picnic area on Mumbles Hill

Mumbles Hill is a hill near the south eastern tip of the Gower Peninsula, Wales. The hill is notable for housing four large storage tanks tunnelled into its limestone rock as part of the Swansea Main Drainage Scheme constructed in the 1930s, which helped eliminate sewage pollution in Swansea Bay. Parts of the hill form a designated Local Nature Reserve, declared in 1991.

Defensive gunnery positions were built on the hill in World War II. Remnants of the 623rd Anti-Aircraft Battery gun emplacements and control bunker are still visible on the hill. Coastal Defence Battery 299 had a site on a hill with 6 inch gun and underground magazines, though none of this remains on the hill. There are, however, information boards marking the spot.

== Swansea main drainage scheme ==
Mumbles Hill played a significant role in the Swansea Main Drainage Scheme of the 1930s. The limestone rock of the hill was utilized for a complex engineering project that included the construction of four large storage tanks tunnelled directly into the hill. As documented by the engineer John Percy Pike in his 1937 paper for the Institution of Civil Engineers, these storage tanks were each roughly 2,000 feet long, 16 feet 6 inches wide and 10 feet 6 inches high, with 20 feet of rock maintained between adjacent tanks. Together, they provided a total capacity of about 7.5 million gallons. As early as 1890, the Swansea Town Council had begun considering comprehensive drainage solutions, with one proposal visualizing a main sewage outfall at Mumbles Head. By 1915, the scheme was formally incorporated as an integral part of the borough extension proposals, which Parliament sanctioned in 1918.

The project included a screening chamber and disintegrating pumps constructed adjacent to the main road, which required removing approximately 6,000 cubic yards of limestone from the hillside. A statutory requirement stipulated that solid matter had to be cut up sufficiently small to pass through a bar screen with spaces of only half an inch between bars. The scheme also featured access tunnels driven into the hill, with one tunnel at a gradient of 1 in 10 and another at 1 in 7, as well as a main shaft positioned between storage tanks. A ventilating plant was installed in an access gallery built transversely above the tanks at the mid-point of their length, which extracted foul air from the tanks and delivered it through a shaft into the open air near the hill top. The sea outfall works consisted of twin five-foot diameter cast-iron pipes which extended 765 yards from the storage tanks to a point of discharge beyond the Mumbles Lighthouse. The period of discharge was limited by statute to about eight hours per tide cycle, from approximately three hours before to five hours after high water, with sewage being stored in the tanks during the remaining four hours.

The engineering work was particularly challenging due to the topography of Mumbles Hill, which rises about 150 feet above the level of the main road. The surface of the hill was described as "very broken indeed", creating difficulties for survey work. The engineering team had to employ innovative methods for setting out and constructing the works, including the use of plummets suspended by steel wires in the tunnels and creating illuminated targets for precise alignment. Construction took place primarily between 1931 and 1936, with the works formally inaugurated on 30 July 1936. The entire Swansea Main Drainage Scheme cost approximately £2,139,000, with the outfall works and main trunk sewer accounting for £1,234,500 of this total.

This infrastructure, which also included a twin 5-foot diameter cast-iron sea outfall extending from the tanks to a point east of the Mumbles lighthouse, represented a significant portion of the £1,820,000 main drainage scheme for Swansea. The completed scheme represented an important environmental improvement for Swansea, eliminating sewage pollution that had affected the River Tawe and Swansea Bay for over half a century.
