= Amir Drori =

Founder of the Israel Antiquities Authority

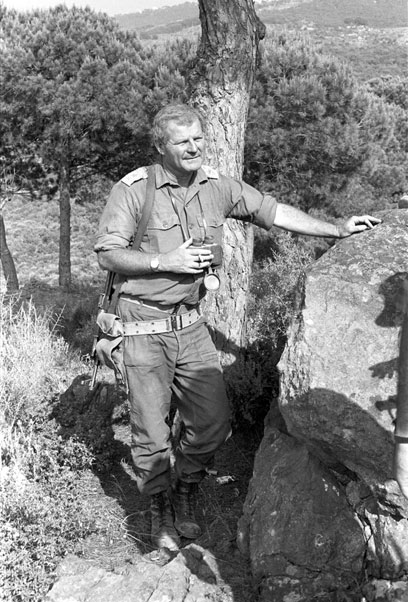
- Amir Drori, 1982
- Native name: אמיר דרורי
- Born: August 5, 1937; Tel Aviv, Mandatory Palestine
- Died: March 12, 2005 (aged 67)
- Allegiance: Israel
- Branch: Israel Defense Forces
- Service years: 1955–1988
- Rank: Aluf (Major General)
- Commands: Golani Brigade, Northern Command, Deputy Chief of the General Staff, Commander GOC Army Headquarters
- Conflicts: 1956 Suez Crisis; Six-Day War; War of Attrition; Yom Kippur War; 1982 Lebanon War
- Awards: Medal of Courage
- Other work: Director of the Israel Antiquities Authority

Amir Drori (Hebrew: אמיר דרורי; 1937–2005) was an Israeli general, founder and the first director general of the Israel Antiquities Authority.

== Military career ==
Amir Drori was born in Tel Aviv in 1937 and graduated from the IDF's Junior Command Preparatory School in Haifa. He was drafted into the Israel Defense Forces in 1955, where he joined the Golani infantry brigade. During the 1956 Suez Crisis Drori led a demolition team and participated in fighting in Rafah and the Sinai. He was awarded the Medal of Courage for his part in the Israeli raid on the Syrian village of Tawafiq in 1960.

During the 1967 Six-Day War Drori served as deputy commander of Golani's 51st Battalion and took part in fighting on the Golan Heights. During the subsequent War of Attrition he commanded Golani's 13th Battalion, participating in fighting on the Golan Heights, Beit She'an Valley, the Jordan Valley and along the Suez Canal. Between 1970 and 1972 he served as the chief operations officer of Israel's Southern Command, under Ariel Sharon.

In 1972 Drori was given command of the Golani Brigade, which he was to lead through the intensive fighting of the 1973 Yom Kippur War. The brigade participated in the efforts to halt the Syrians on the Golan Heights, as well as in the battles for Mount Hermon and the Israeli push into Syria. He was wounded during the Third Battle of Mount Hermon, in which his troops recaptured the Israeli post held by Syrian commandos, but returned to lead the brigade during the fighting preceding the final disengagement agreements of May 1974.

In 1976 Drori was appointed to lead the IDF's 36th Armored Division. A year later he received the rank of Aluf and was appointed head of the Operations Directorate's operations department. He went on to command the IDF's training department before given command of Israel's Northern Command in 1981. He played a significant role in the 1982 Lebanon War (Operation Peace for Galilee), leading Israeli forces to the gates of Beirut through fighting with both the Syrian Army and the Palestine Liberation Organization. His conduct during the Sabra and Shatila massacre was investigated by the Kahan Commission which saw no reason to make any recommendations against him. Drori served at Northern Command for another year before leaving in December 1983. He spent the next year studying in the US.

Drori returned to Israel in 1984 and was assigned command of IDF ground forces, later went on to head the IDF's Operations Directorate, and in October 1986 became the Deputy Chief of the General Staff. He retired from the IDF in 1988 following his failure to secure the post of Chief of the General Staff.

== Civilian career ==
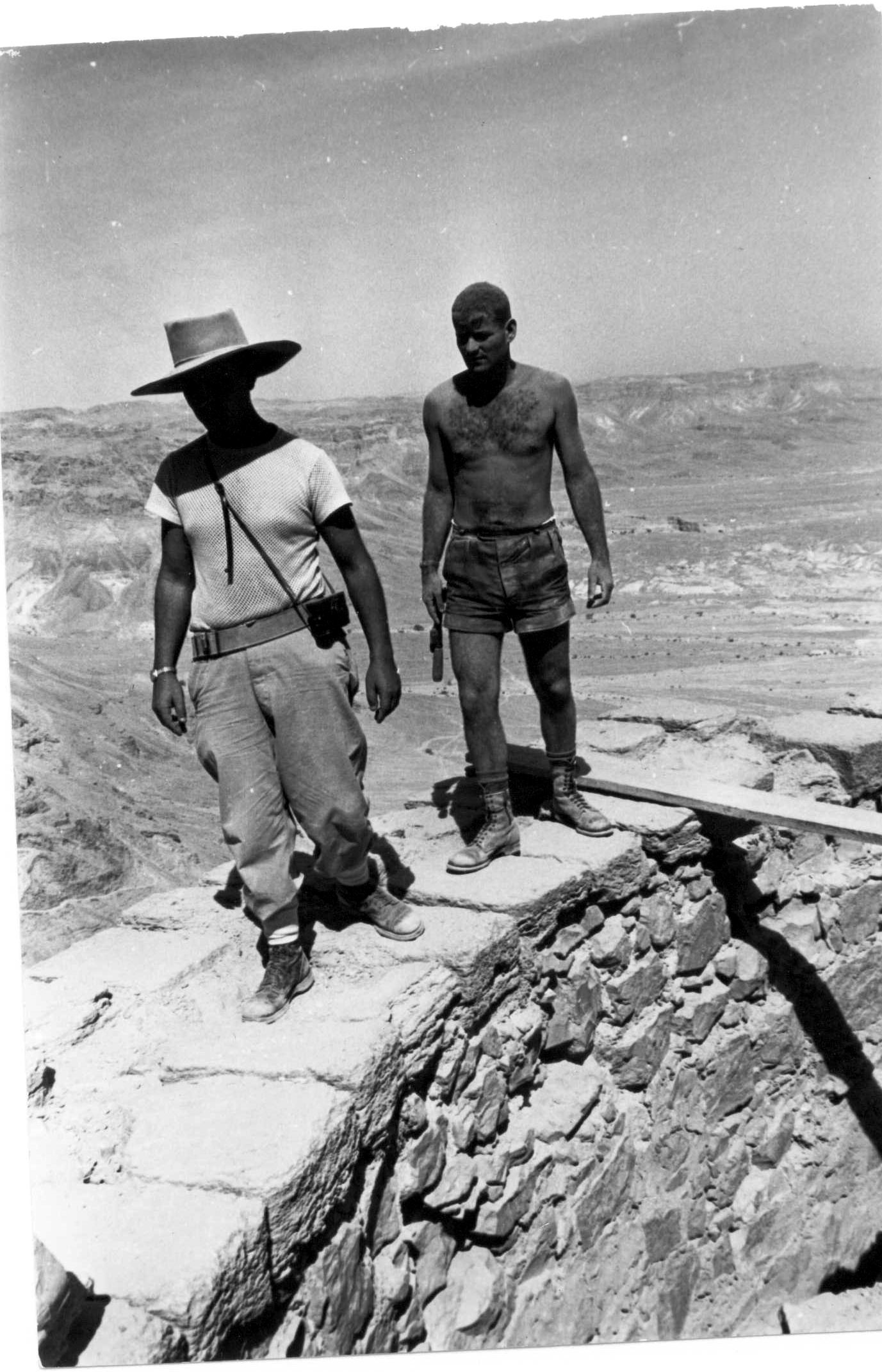
Amir Drori with Yigael Yadin at Masada, 1963

Between 1961 and 1964 Drori had studied Archaeology at the Hebrew University in Jerusalem, participating in several digs, including that of Yigael Yadin at Masada. Upon his retirement from the IDF he was appointed head of the Israeli Ministry of Education's Department of Antiquities. Under his guidance and leadership the department was expanded and restructured, in 1990 becoming the Israel Antiquities Authority (IAA) with Drori as its first director general.

Drori's tenure with the IAA was plagued by clashes with Haredi elements which considered archaeological exploration of possible burial sites as an affront to Judaism. Haredi political parties repeatedly campaigned for his dismissal, going as far as to threaten abandoning the governing coalition unless they were given control of tomb excavations. He occasionally received death threats and was even reputed to have been the target of a Pulsa diNura, a kabbalistic ceremony supposedly intended to bring about the death of an individual.

Despite weathering these challenges, Drori quit his post in 2000 after having already secured its extension.

== Death ==
Amir Drori died on March 12, 2005, after suffering a heart attack during a hiking trip in the Negev. The IAA excavations at the Roman theatre of Tiberias have been named in his honour. Archaeological exhibits at Ben Gurion Airport, in memory of general Amir Drori, the founder of the IAA, display spectacular mosaics from the Byzantine period.

His grandson, Amit Peled, a soldier in the Egoz Unit, was killed in battle during the October 7th attacks.
