= Muir of Tarradale =

Coordinates: 57.52131°N 4.42663°W

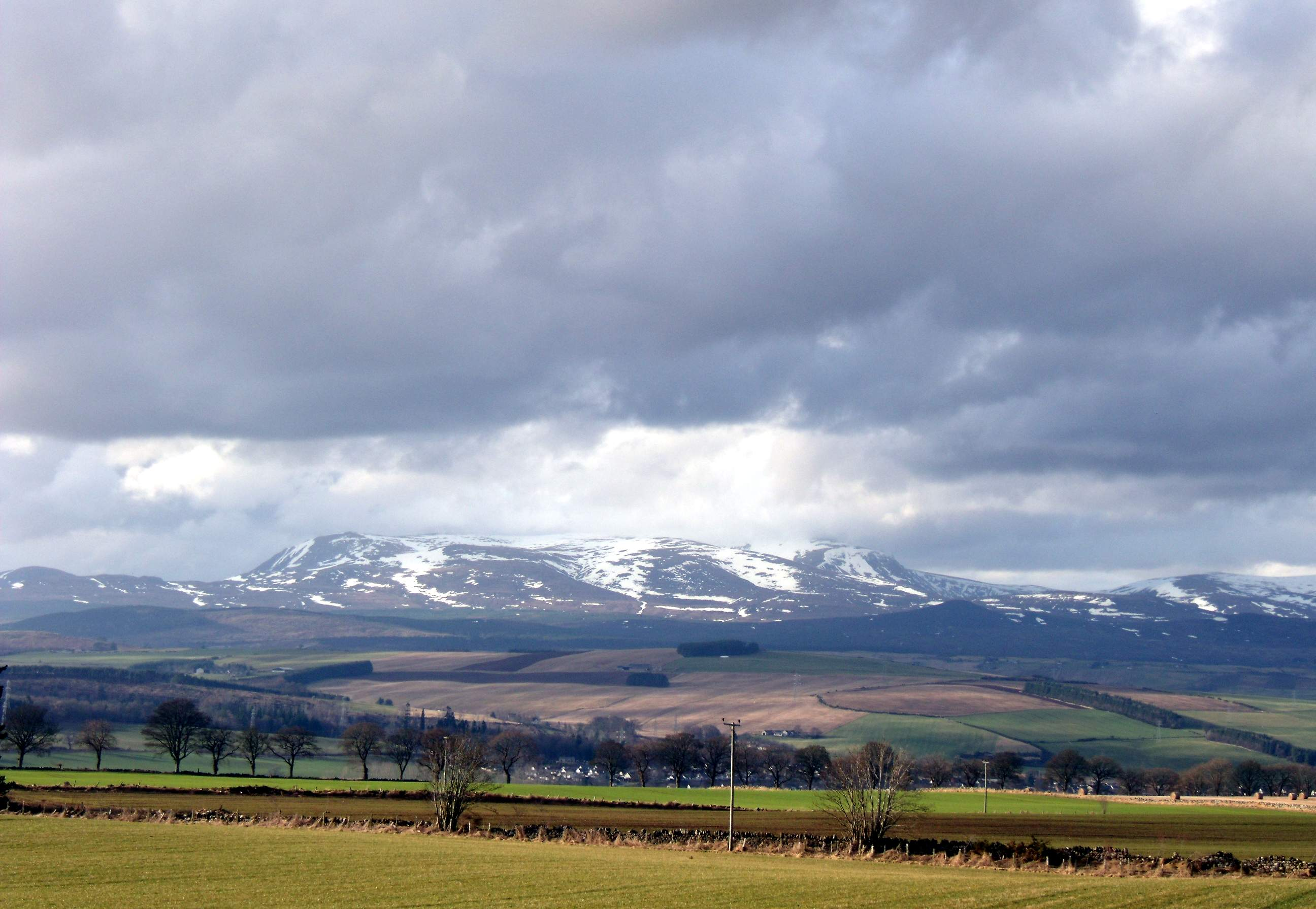
- Ben Wyvis as viewed from Muir of Tarradale.

- Location within the Ross and Cromarty area
- OS grid reference: NH547505
- Council area: Highland
- Country: Scotland
- Sovereign state: United Kingdom
- Post town: Muir of Ord
- Postcode district: IV6 7
- Police: Scotland
- Fire: Scottish
- Ambulance: Scottish

Muir of Tarradale is a scattered crofting township, lying 1.5 miles east of Muir of Ord on the western side of the Black Isle, in Ross-shire, Scottish Highlands and is in the Scottish council area of Highland.
