= Mulberry, Cornwall =

Hamlet in Lanivet, Cornwall, England

Coordinates: 50.4625°N 4.7808°W

Mulberry is a hamlet in the parish of Lanivet, Cornwall, England.
