= Muie =

Coordinates: 58.00582°N 4.24741°W

Muie: Scottish Gaelic: Muigh
- Village
- Location within the Sutherland area
- OS grid reference: NC672040
- Council area: Highland
- Lieutenancy area: Sutherland
- Country: Scotland
- Sovereign state: United Kingdom
- Post town: Rogart
- Postcode district: IV28 3UB
- Police: Scotland
- Fire: Scottish
- Ambulance: Scottish

Muie (Scottish Gaelic: Muigh) is a remote village, situated in Rogart, eastern Sutherland, Scottish Highlands and is in the Scottish council area of Highland.

The village of Ardachu lies less than 0.5 miles to the south with the village of Lairg lying 5 miles west along the main A839 road, with the villages of Pittentrail and Morvich lying east along the A839.

Due to its village being sparsely populated, small size and remoteness, data specific to Sutherland is not readily available, with statistics more commonly found on parish and regional level.

== Languages & Cultures ==
Historically, Scottish Gaelic was the dominant language in this region, however, the language uses has declined significantly, with the primary speaker being older residents. Efforts to preserve it has shown result, but resources and supports is still limited.
