= First Battle of Mount Hermon =

1973 battle of the Yom Kippur War

- Part of the Yom Kippur War
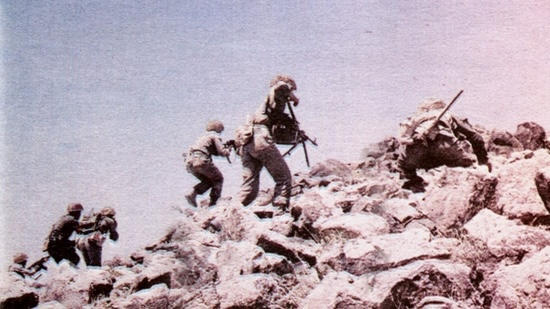
- Syrian soldiers (presumably) storming the mount of Hermon.
Date	October 6–7, 1973
Location	Mount Hermon
Result	Syrian victory
Territorial changes	Syria regains Mount Hermon

Belligerents
Israel	Syria

Commanders and leaders
Amir Drori	Ahmed Rifai al-Joju

Strength
55 soldiers (14 fighters)	1 commando battalion (~300 soldiers)

Casualties and losses
16 killed (including 2 prisoners); 12 wounded 31 captured	15 killed 3 wounded 1 helicopter crashed

The First Battle of Mount Hermon was fought at the outset of the Yom Kippur War between the Syrian Army and the Israel Defense Forces (IDF). On Yom Kippur, October 6, 1973, Syrian commandos attacked and captured the IDF outpost on Mount Hermon. Two days later, the Syrians repelled an Israeli counterattack in the Second Battle of Mount Hermon. It was eventually recaptured by Israel on October 21 in the Third Battle.

== Background ==
At a height of about 6,600 feet (2,000 m), Mount Hermon has a commanding view of the Galilee. After Israel's capture of it in the Six-Day War, it was used as a radar outpost, housing some of the IDF's most sensitive and secret electronic equipment. Israel also constructed an approach road and a ski lift. The troops manning the Hermon outpost could view the entire Syrian plain bordering on the Purple Line, there were observation posts on the outpost itself and at the upper level of the ski lift. The outpost was constructed with much help from the Druze living in the Golan. In April 1970, Colonel Hikmat Shahabi, chief of Syrian Military Intelligence, sent a letter with Sergeant-Major Nozi tewfik Abu Saleh, a Syrian Druze, to Kemal Kanj, a Golan Heights Druze leader and former member of the Syrian parliament whose brother was a general in the Syrian Army. Saleh, who was also related to Kanj, crossed the border on foot and delivered the letter, which asked Kanj to provide details regarding Israeli positions. Kanj agreed and carried out his mission. He was caught by the Israeli Military Intelligence Directorate (AMAN) in May 1971. He was pardoned in June 1973.

The Hermon outpost was considered strategically important for several reasons, such as: gathering early warning information, real-time intelligence collection, conducting electronic warfare (EW) against ground or air attack, artillery spotting on the Damascus plain, using the Hermon ridge and its western slopes for a strategic flanking move toward Syria, conducting operations in Syria and Lebanon and commanding Israel's main water sources.

The outpost was isolated in its sector with only a narrow access road connecting it to the Golan Heights and Shebaa Farms. It was made up of three levels: an underground section of bunkers for quarters, ammunition, food and water, (which were connected by tunnels to the guard and observation posts) and two above-ground storeys which contained the work rooms, laboratories, infirmary, mess, generators and observation and guard posts. When the war broke out, the outpost was still under construction and fighting positions, communication trenches and a command position were not yet built.

The outpost was situated in the 13th Battalion's sector, but was commanded by Lieutenant Gadi Zidover from the 820th Regional Brigade, whose operational subordination was not properly classified. On Yom Kippur there were sixty soldiers in the outpost: thirteen of them were 13th Battalion infantrymen, the rest were men from support units, artillerymen, non-commissioned officers from the Israeli Northern Command (NC) and regional brigade intelligence and maintenance soldiers from the 820th Brigade. Some of the officers and soldiers had only arrived between October 4 and October 6 with just their personal weapons, others were unarmed. Most of them were not familiar with the layout of the outpost or with the sector in general.

In the days before the war, the artillery forward observation officer reported a growth in the number of Syrian artillery batteries and other forces. A section of troops were assigned to defend it. On Yom Kippur, October 6, 1973, fifty-five men were in the outpost, including the defense section from the Golani Brigade, men from the Israeli Air Force (IAF) and intelligence personnel manning the electronic equipment. NC estimated that the Hermon was not a major axis of advance, and would therefore not be subject to a major attack, only routine raids. The fortifications were built to withstand artillery fire and air bombardments, but the trench system was incomplete. A week before the war, an antiaircraft battery was moved down to the Golan.

== Prelude ==
On Friday, October 5, the outpost reported a vast concentration of Syrian forces on the plain below. The Israeli soldiers were ordered to be on the alert, they shut themselves in the main bunker. The next morning, the observation posts were manned as usual and routine reconnaissance along the approach routes took place. An alert was ordered, but for some reason the Hermon outpost was not reinforced by the required fourteen-man infantry section. The security routine was maintained and included a foot patrol to secure the access road from the outpost to the lower level of the ski lift. It was conducted by the Golani troops and commanded by the platoon commander, Second-Lieutenant Hagai Funk. Only two infantrymen were left to guard the outpost.

After the patrol, the infantrymen returned to the outpost, except for three men who took up positions in an under-construction observation post on a hill north of the upper ski lift. One observation point and two guard positions were manned in the outpost itself. Three watches were deployed at dawn between Shebaa Farms and the lower ski lift, manned by members of the same company, but were subordinated throughout the day to the 902nd Nahal Battalion in Shebaa Farms. Shortly before 14:00, an EW blocking company from the 374th Communications unit, under the command of Lieutenant Moshe Sapir, arrived at the "tank curve" and located its equipment according to NC orders. Due to coordination problems, its arrival was unknown to the outpost commander and the Hermon company commander at the employment camp in Masada.

The Syrians had put the Hermon at the top of their target list. The 82nd Paratroop Battalion, the elite combat unit of the Syrian Army, under the command of Lieutenant Colonel Ahmed Rifai al-Joju, was given its final briefing on the morning of the attack. Al-Joju's company was to be landed by helicopter 0.5 miles (0.80 km) from the outpost and was to take up positions covering the outpost and the road leading toward it from the Golan. The rest of the battalion, about 200 men, were to set out on foot from the Syrian controlled Hermon. This force was to attack the outpost while al-Joju's troops would provide them with covering fire. The plan used data collected through Kanj.

== Battle ==
=== Syrian attack ===
At around 13:00, four Soviet-built MI-8 helicopters lifted off near Damascus and flew west into Lebanon, where they circled until forty-five minutes into the Syrian shelling of the Golan. They then headed southeast toward the Israeli outpost. The Israelis detected the helicopters at about 15:00, when the team at the upper ski lift reported them and fired at them until they flew out of sight. At 13:45, the artillery officer, along with other officers, noticed that the Syrian artillery units in the plain below were taking the camouflage nets from their guns.

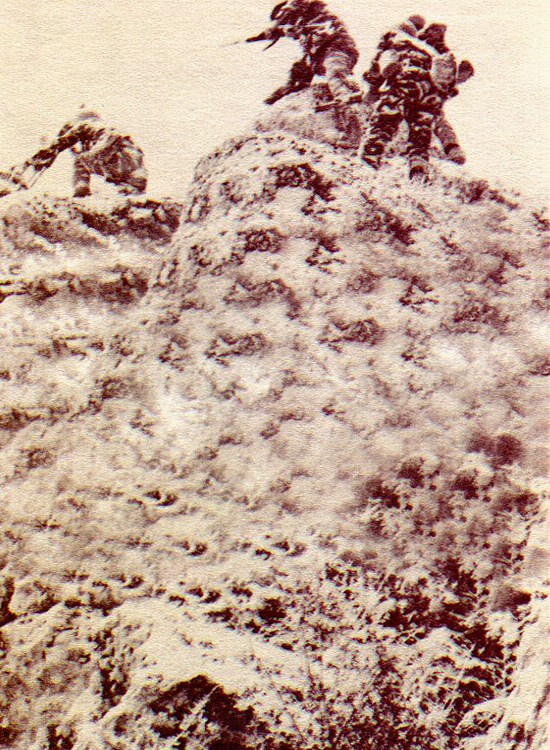
Syrian soldiers storming the Mount Hermon.

The Syrians began shelling the outpost at 14:00. All the Israeli soldiers in the outpost concentrated in the central hall of the bunker. The platoon officer and the mortar sergeant climbed up to the observation point but had to come back down due to the heavy shelling. An observation officer, a technical assistant and a driver from the 334th Artillery Battalion left the outpost in a half-track for their planned position in the "tank curve" to help pinpoint the artillery in the northern Golan. Six Syrian Air Force MiG-17 aircraft attacked the outpost. Three of the helicopters arrived from the west. Two of them landed about thirty paratroopers on Hill 2072, south of the lower ski lift. Most of the Syrian force deployed above the curve south of the upper ski lift to block access to the outpost. A few of them advanced toward the outpost to provide cover. A third helicopter with sixteen paratroopers, who were supposed to block the "tank curve", crashed (a rotor-blade hit the slope). Only three paratroopers survived and joined their comrades at the upper ski lift. They opened fire on the Israeli half-track, which kept driving. The company commander of the EW unit and his driver, who were riding in a jeep on their way to the outpost, saw the Syrians landing and turned back to their unit at the "tank curve", under fire. Three Golani soldiers at the upper ski lift observation post saw the Syrian landing but failed to fire at them due to a machine gun malfunction. After a few minutes, they abandoned their post, which was equipped with a radio, and went down to the lower ski lift to join a platoon positioned there without informing the outpost of the Syrian landing.

While Joju's troops were taking-up positions, the rest of the 82nd Battalion, two companies under the command of Captains Jassam al Salah and Mahmoud Ma'aleh, advanced on foot from the Syrian controlled Hermon position to the Israeli outpost. They were organized in eight platoon-sized forces. At around 15:15, when the first two forces arrived near the outpost, Syrian artillery opened fire and the covering force directed small-arms fire at the outpost. Meanwhile, the fourth helicopter approached and landed sixteen more commandos. Some of them joined the charge at the outpost while the rest formed a second covering force.

When the shelling subsided small-arms fire could be heard from the central hall. Zidover, Funk, and four other Golani soldiers came out to the fighting platform through the upper western opening. They saw dozens of Syrian soldiers advancing on the road toward the outpost gate and a covering force lying on the embankment outside the outpost fence. Of their three machine guns, two were out of action after the shelling. Though lacking fighting positions, the outpost commander and the infantrymen opened fire with a machine gun and their personal weapons. The Syrians were surprised by the fire and halted. The machine gunner was killed and the outpost sergeant took over the weapon. The outpost commander realized that ammunition was low and went down to the central hall to contact the 820th Brigade commander, Colonel Zvi Barazani. He explained the situation and asked him to "fire on our outposts". Barazani approved and the 334th Battalion commander, Lieutenant-Colonel Aryeh Schwartz, accepted the mission. The Golani soldiers kept firing at the Syrians and prevented them from entering the outpost until approximately 15:45, when the Israeli shelling began. At this point Barazani ordered the outpost commander to shut his men in the outpost until the shelling was over and break out only on his command. Due to a misunderstanding, the soldiers did not leave the outpost and continued defending its openings from within.

The Syrians charged into the outpost courtyard and some managed to penetrate the upper western opening into the top storey, throwing fragmentation and stun grenades and firing into the work rooms. Their entrance was hesitant and slow, and included calls in Hebrew and Arabic to the Israeli soldiers to surrender. Some went down the staircase leading to the central hall and threw grenades into it. They reached the hall but did not enter the rooms or the connecting tunnels. They may have used a smoke generator operated by a small engine. The hall filled with smoke dust and the sounds of explosions, which induced panic among the Israeli non-combatant soldiers. Many of them were choking and believed the Syrians were using gas. The room was full of dust, they had to cover their noses with flannelette soaked in urine to breathe. Some tried to take cover in the tunnels, but some were in a state of shock and remained frozen in the rooms near the central hall. Between 16:00 and 17:00, some of the soldiers returned fire from various corners of the central hall in the direction of the staircase and prevented the Syrians from coming down. The outpost commander tried to concentrate the men from the different tunnels and rooms into a single tunnel. At this point, the outpost lost its connection with the outside world.

At about 17:30, the outpost commander and several infantry soldiers tried to break out through one of the tunnels in order to get out and reach the upper ski lift, but they encountered some Syrians and had to return. Most of the men were now concentrated in the same tunnel, except for the doctor and two Golani soldiers, one of whom was dead and the other wounded. Five others hid in two bunkers in the bottom level. Since some of the men did not know their way around the outpost, they split up in the dark into two groups, which remained close to each other. At around 19:00, the Syrians stopped clearing the interior of the Israeli position and it became relatively quiet.

=== Wadi Si'on ===
At around 16:50, the men in the "Hedva" observation post, located near the Lebanese village of Shebaa, were ordered to move back to Masada via the lower ski lift, with their armored personnel carrier (APC). At about 17:00, the APC, along with an 81mm mortar half-track approached Wadi Si'on, (where the "Tali" observation point was located); both positions came under heavy fire from the ridge above them. The APC was hit by an RPG and stopped in the middle of the road. Three Israeli soldiers were killed instantly, the rest were wounded and took cover. The "Tali" commander, exposed in his half-track, was hit by a bullet in the back, but the driver started the vehicle and sped off toward the lower ski lift.

The attacking Syrians were probably the blocking force from the 87th Reconnaissance Battalion, which was supposed to take up positions in the "tank curve" that night, but strayed into the area above the road from the lower ski lift and Shebaa Farms. The Syrians maintained a constant fire and left without coming down to the road. At nightfall, at around 17:35, after the Syrians left, the "Hedva" observation post reported the encounter to the 902nd Battalion company headquarters at Shebaa Farms and asked for assistance. Company headquarters reported to the 820th Brigade headquarters at Nafakh. Putting together a rescue force, which included a doctor, a paramedic and five infantrymen, took an hour. The force, advancing in two APCs, moved slowly and carefully with its lights off. At about 18:30, it arrived at the location, treated the wounded and evacuated them. From that moment until the end of the war, no IDF troops entered the territory between Shebaa farms and the Hermon mountainside.

At around 19:30, Barazani ordered the commander of the Hermon Company, Lieutenant Yiftah Sagiv, to head from Masada to the lower ski lift with an APC and a tank platoon from the attached 71st Battalion, to check on the outpost and evacuate the wounded that had arrived in the afternoon. The force reached the lower ski lift at around 21:00. Sagiv saw that everything was in order and reported that fact to the battalion commander. Barazani ordered him to leave the tank platoon to defend the place. The company commander left on his own accord to evacuate the wounded to Nafakh. When he arrived near midnight, he reported to the NC chief and the others about the incidents at the Hermon.

At around 21:00, the outpost commander decided to try to escape to the lower ski lift. Due to a lack of communication with the other men, only he, five officers and eleven soldiers got out. They crossed a minefield, went down the Bul'an valley and headed west toward the upper ski lift. Just before 23:00, as they began to head down a rocky slope from the upper ski lift, the Syrian blocking force saw them and opened fire. The platoon commander and five of his men charged down the hill. Three were killed, including the platoon commander, and two were taken prisoner the next day. Other officers and soldiers took cover and returned fire. The observation officer was badly wounded and later died. The other eleven, some of whom were wounded, escaped the encounter and scattered. The escapees ran down the road and encountered three Israeli tanks heading their way. One of the tanks fired at them before they could identify themselves. During the night and the next day, ten of them made their way back to the Israeli lines. A soldier from the IAF unit in the outpost accidentally entered a 183rd Syrian Battalion position, deployed on high point 1614. He was caught and executed the next day.

=== Counterattack ===
At 18:07, NC accepted the suggestion raised by the Golani Brigade commander, Colonel Amir Drori, to try to reach the outpost. While the eleven Israeli soldiers were trying to make their escape, a Golani force – made up of Drori's command half-track, the 51st Battalion command post with companies A and B in fifteen more half-tracks, the 69th Reconnaissance Company in eight other half-tracks and the brigade's battalion collecting station in an ambulance – was on its way to the Hermon. The force left Rosh Pina at 07:01 and reached Neve Ativ at 04:01, but NC ordered Drori to stop, fearing a Syrian breakthrough in the Hadar-Masada sector and ordered him to deploy for a block around bunkers 103, 104 and 105, with the 13th Battalion subordinated to the brigade. Unaware of the situation throughout the Golan, Drori objected, assuming it was best to strike as early as possible and deny the Syrians time to organize. He was denied, and the force started moving back via the Sa'ar Bridge toward Masada. At 04:21, Drori was ordered to organize for a block, and at 05:19 his troops were deployed in their sector.

While the reduced 51st Battalion and the 69th Company were deployed around Masada at around 07:00, a convoy came down from the lower ski lift, having been ordered to do so by the 13th Battalion commander, Lieutenant-Colonel Ze'ev Oren. It included a tank platoon from the 71st Battalion, the infantry platoon from the 13th Battalion manning the lower ski lift in two BTR-152 APCs, the observation officer's half-track and the communications company from the 374th unit in its three vehicles. It also included the five survivors from the outpost. The three tanks remained attached to the Golani Brigade. Thirty-six soldiers were still trapped in the outpost. Two Israeli soldiers wounded in the encounter on the ridge were captured by the Syrians. Six of the soldiers who escaped made their way down the mountain, along with three observation soldiers who escaped from the upper ski lift.

=== Capture ===
At around 06:00 on October 7, the two wounded soldiers that were captured were questioned and taken to a ravine outside the outpost. At around 09:00, the Israeli soldiers in the northeastern tunnels heard shots in the courtyard. The Syrians may have fired Israeli weapons captured at the upper ski lift, and some of the Israeli soldiers thought it was their rescuers firing. Four soldiers hiding in the communication bunker heard the shots and came out through a position blown up by the Syrians that morning. Noticing soldiers with olive-colored uniforms, Uzis and an IDF helmet, a radio technician came out and yelled "Golani, Golani, don't shoot!", before his eyes had adapted to the sunlight when he noticed they were Syrians. He and the others ran back in and the Syrians chased them, throwing smoke grenades. Not knowing where the other Israelis were hiding, the Syrians called on them to surrender through the generator gratings and pointed flashlights inside, saying that whoever did not come out would be killed. The Israelis contemplated surrender, but the Golani platoon sergeant refused, opting instead to try to break out through the northeastern position. At around 11:00, he led them through the tunnel connecting the generators to the position. He came out onto the roof first, followed by a Golani soldier, an AMAN soldier and a radio operator. They were spotted on the roof, near the main entrance of the anti-aircraft hill north of the outpost.

Perhaps as a response to the Syrian calls to surrender, the sergeant opened fire and threw two grenades at the Syrians. The three Israelis were killed soon after. The others who got out lay in a trench, the Syrians firing at them but missing. When they concluded they had no chance, they surrendered. The radio technician, who waved a piece of white cloth, was killed. The Syrians held their fire, ordered the Israelis down to the courtyard and told them to lay down their weapons and helmets. At about 11:30, two Syrians entered the doctor's room on the top storey and captured him along with two Golani soldiers who were with him, one of them badly wounded. In the late afternoon, the twenty-six captured Israelis were disarmed and their hands tied with telephone wire; they were then led, tied in pairs, toward the Syrian outpost. They were escorted by about thirty Syrian soldiers from the 82nd Battalion. A badly wounded Golani soldier who fell behind was killed, his body left behind. From the Syrian outpost, the prisoners were transferred by trucks to a special forces training base at Qaboun, near Damascus, where they stayed for four days.

Five Israeli soldiers remained in the outpost: a quartermaster hiding in the emergency bunker and four soldiers hiding in the war room bunker. They found some rations in the nearby maintenance bunker and a plastic water tank, which sustained them until October 12. Using a transistor radio, they heard that the Israeli settlers in the Golan had returned to their homes and so decided to keep hiding until the IDF recaptured the outpost. In the first three days, the Syrians raked the outpost with gunfire and grenades each morning and each night. When the outpost became relatively quiet, the Israelis tried on more than one occasion to get out, but returned after hearing the Syrian guards in the central hall. At around 11:00 on Friday, October 12, Syrian soldiers entered the tunnels to look for food and caught the Israelis, including the quartermaster, by accident. The prisoners were transferred, through the Syrian outpost, to Qaboun. On October 15, all thirty one prisoners were taken to an olive grove and photographed by journalists; they were transferred to a prison the next day.

== Aftermath ==
In the battles fought in the outpost itself, near the upper ski lift and in Wadi Si'on, sixteen Israelis were killed and twelve wounded. Seven were killed and four wounded in the outpost, four were killed and three wounded near the upper ski lift, three were killed and four wounded in the Si'on encounter. Two were executed by the Syrians after their capture, thirty-one were taken prisoner. Syrian casualties were fifteen killed (twelve commandos and three helicopter crewmen) and three officers wounded trying to penetrate the outpost. The Syrians captured the outpost, the lower ski lift and the entire Hermon mountainside.

Soviet advisers arrived at the outpost a few days later to dismantle the electronic equipment, they were pleased to find most of it intact. Syrian interrogators were also able to extract valuable information from the captured Israelis. The electronic equipment was sent to the Soviet Union for analysis, the documents captured compromised Israeli military codes. With the fall of the Hermon, AMAN lost its "eyes on the Golan", the loss of the antennas on the listening posts damaged its ability to collect information.

Author Abraham Rabinovich wrote that "the fall of the Hermon was for Israel the single most humiliating episode of the Yom Kippur War". Author Walter J. Boyne commented that this was the first time in Israel's history that a commander had abandoned a position while his troops were still fighting. Funk was believed by many Israelis to be at fault for the defeat, as summarized by one soldier: "The officers ran away". The Israelis made a failed attempt to recapture the Hermon on October 8, but finally succeeded on October 21, in Operation Dessert.
