= Murcot =

Hamlet in Worcestershire, England

Coordinates: 52.05925°N 1.90952°W

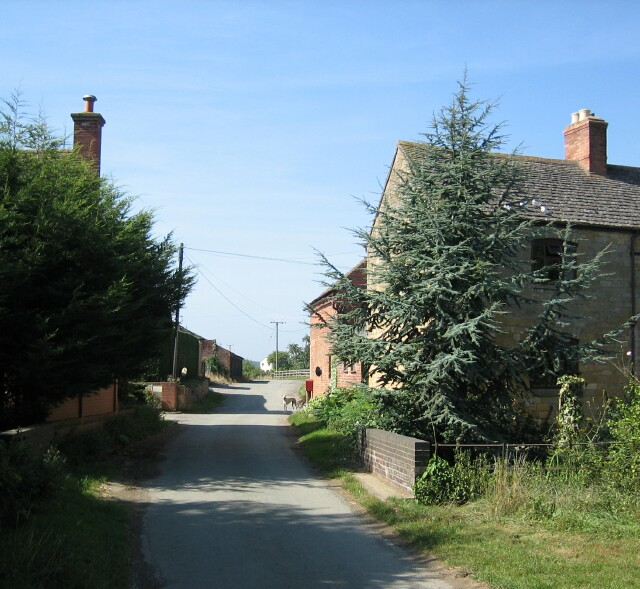
- Murcot

- Location within Worcestershire
- OS grid reference: SP063401
- District: Wychavon
- Shire county: Worcestershire
- Region: West Midlands
- Country: England
- Sovereign state: United Kingdom
- Post town: BROADWAY
- Postcode district: WR12
- Police: West Mercia
- Fire: Hereford and Worcester
- Ambulance: West Midlands

Murcot is a hamlet in the English county of Worcestershire.

Murcot is located in the west of the Vale of Evesham and is to the west and south of the village of Wickhamford. Administratively Murcot is part of the district of Wychavon.
