= Second Battle of Mount Hermon =

1973 battle of the Yom Kippur War

- Part of the Yom Kippur War
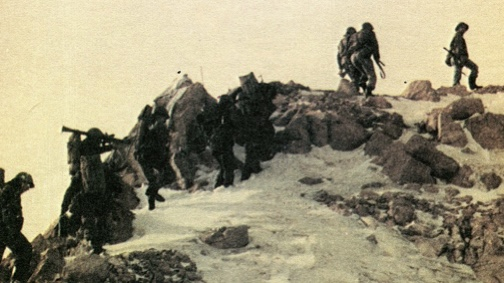
- Syrian soldiers on the Mount Hermon.
Date	October 8, 1973
Location	Mount Hermon
Result	Syrian victory

Belligerents
Israel	Syria

Commanders and leaders
Amir Drori	Ahmed Rifai al-Joju (DOW)

Strength
2 infantry battalions, 2 tanks	1 paratroop battalion (~400 soldiers), 1 commando battalion

Casualties and losses
23 killed 55 wounded	29 killed 11 wounded

The Second Battle of Mount Hermon was fought on October 8, 1973, during the Yom Kippur War between the Syrian Army and the Israeli Army. After the IDF outpost on Mount Hermon was captured by Syria on October 6, Israel decided to launch a hasty counterattack. The Syrians repelled the attack, and held on to the Hermon until October 21.

== Background ==
On Yom Kippur, October 6, 1973, Egypt and Syria launched a war against Israel that had occupied the Sinai Peninsula and the Golan Heights since the Six-Day War. As part of the initial Syrian attack near 14:00, a commando force was landed by helicopters near Mount Hermon. The IDF outpost on the mountain was caught by surprise, and fell before the next morning. Several Israeli soldiers managed to escape.

== Prelude ==
=== Syrian preparations ===
Following the 82nd Syrian Paratroop Battalion's complete takeover of the Israeli Hermon outpost on October 7, the 82nd Syrian Paratroop Battalion, under the command of Lieutenant Ahmad Rifai al-Joju, spent the morning clearing the site. He oversaw the burial of the Israeli bodies and the transportation of the Israeli prisoners out of the area. In the afternoon, he was ordered to prepare a blocking position downslope of the outpost. The battalion deployed between the upper ski lift and the Israeli outpost, getting ready for an Israeli counterattack. A company, reinforced by the battalion's supporting arms, deployed south of the lower ski lift, mostly west of the road. The fighters deployed along the slopes descending from the curves and built positions by heaping stones between the local rocks. A recoilless gun team took positions in a dugout east of the road. The engineering troops deployed a string of exposed mines on the road about 350 meters north of the "tank curve". The other two companies deployed in the commanding areas west of the outpost and south of the access road, from the landing-field to Hill 2072. one platoon positioned in the outpost, along with twenty engineering soldiers and the twenty-five men battalion mortar company without the mortars. In that area, two B-10 RCLs, aimed at the road leading from the upper ski lift to the outpost, and four Strela antiaircraft operators were also stationed. The battalion commander command post also took position west of the outpost, and a platoon was deployed near it to break counterattacks. Two observation officers were deployed in the outpost itself.

At dawn on October 7, the 183rd Commando Battalion was deployed on high point 1614 on the Hermon mountainside, southwest of the 82nd Battalion. The 183rd Battalion was the northern flank along with the 68th Infantry Brigade and the Moroccan expeditionary force in the 7th Infantry Division's breakthrough attempt. Its mission was apparently to capture Bunker 103 in Majdal Shams and then move through the Ya'afuri Valley to block the Majdal Shams-Masada road and later move across the Banias to Ghajar. On the night of October 6–7, it moved westward on foot from the Hadar area through the Hermon slopes and deployed on high point 1614. In the afternoon of October 7, its reconnaissance company seems to have attacked Bunker 103 and then retreated back to the battalion area. On the morning of October 8 the battalion was still set for defending high point 1614 and did not advance westward, since the 7th Division was stopped on the Hadar-Masada road.

=== Israeli decision to attack ===
Since 15:58 on October 6, when contact with the outpost was lost, the Israeli Northern Command (NC) knew the outpost fell to the Syrians, but did not know what happened to its soldiers. NC considered it imperative to recapture the Hermon, for both moral and strategic reasons. About an hour after contact was lost, the NC Operations Branch officer, Colonel Uri Simhoni, suggested to plan an infantry assault on the outpost. NC chief, General Yitzhak Hofi, agreed and delegated the planning to the 317th Reserve Paratroop Brigade, under the command of Haim Nadel, which was still being recruited and was transferred to NC. Amir Drori, the Golani Brigade commander, arrived at the command post at Nafakh and asked to be the planner. Hofi agreed, and Drori decided to attack as soon as possible, in order to deny the Syrians time to prepare. During October 7, Golani's 13th and 12th Battalions were fighting in the northern sector of the Golan. Two 51st Battalion companies with the brigade command post were deployed near the Masada crossroad. Shooting sounds were occasionally heard from the Hermon, leading the Golani Brigade commanders to think that the Syrians have not yet captured the outpost. At around 07:00, Drori spoke to the mortar non-commissioned officer, who escaped from the outpost, and questioned him. The questioning convinced Drori that the Hermon must be attacked quickly. At 11:00, he asked Hofi to attack, but Hofi refused.

At noon, when Dov Dror, the 17th Battalion commander, arrived in the northern sector with two squad commanders' course companies, Drori ordered Yehuda Peled, the 51st Battalion commander, to brief Dror and his company commander regarding the recapture of the Hermon. Since the evening of October 6, Peled had been studying the outpost using engineering sketches he received from the Israeli Defense Ministry's construction supervisor. When Peled briefed the 17th Battalion before sunset, he focused mostly on the outpost structure and the methods for clearing it, and less on the order of battle, the routes and the expected difficulties. The commanders had no information regarding the Syrian deployment, and the briefing had settled for a 1:50,000 scale map. At dawn on October 8, the Air Force unit commander and a reserve observation soldier, the last two escapees from the outpost, arrived at Bunker 103. The bunker commander called Drori, who questioned them on the spot. They said there were still a few dozen soldiers in the outpost, which convinced Drori that they must be rescued. Their sense of time was distorted, and they said that they escaped only one day before. At 06:47, Drori radioed Hofi, updated him on the survivors, and asked for a go-ahead, which Hofi granted.

=== Israeli Plan ===
When the go-ahead was given, Drori consulted with Peled and decided that the attack would be carried out by the following forces: The 51st Battalion with the battalion command post, the second company and the battalion collecting station; the 17th Battalion with the battalion command post and two squad commanders' course companies; two tanks from the 71st Armored Battalion platoon, which was attached to the Golani Brigade and Drori's command post. At around 07:00, Drori updated Peled on the attack and ordered him to arrive with his two companies to the bridge over Wadi Sa'ar. After consultation, Peled decided that company A would continue its blocking mission at the Masada crossroad and subordinated the tank company's third tank to it. At that time, the 13th Battalion's company B and a staff company from the Brigade Training Base (BTB), both under the command of the BTB commander, who had organized in Rosh Pina, arrived at Masada. Drori ordered them to defend the Masada crossroad. He also intended to leave half of the reconnaissance company at the crossroad, but after consulting with the company's former commander, who accompanied Drori, it was decided that half the company would join the 1st Battalion. The 51st Battalion's Company B commander, who was with his company in the middle of Majdal Shams, was ordered to wait with his company in the western entrance of the village and join the Brigade column.

At around 07:30, Drori quickly briefed Peled, Dror and his company commanders, the reconnaissance company deputy commander and the tank platoon commander, near the bridge over Wadi Sa'ar. In the ten-minute brief, Drori explained that the 17th Battalion would advance on half-tracks on the road to the outpost. The column was to be led by the two tanks, while the reduced 51st Battalion and half of the reconnaissance company were to move along the ridge on foot. Most of the briefing was about the outpost structure. The commanders were told that the first force to reach the outpost would be ordered to clear it. At this point, a Syrian shelling started, and the briefing was cut as Drori ordered the commanders to mount their half-tracks and start moving. The company commanders did not get the time to brief the fighters, and had no information about the Syrian dispositions. The brigade was not detailed any air or artillery assistance, but Drori assumed those could be provided along the way. The half-tracks were received or "borrowed" from the emergency reserve stores, and were only half equipped and in a bad technical condition. They had no machine-guns, machine-gun ammunition or machine-gun pedestals, so the units' machine-guns could not be placed. The 17th Battalion lacked rifle grenades and it departed without its battalion collecting station. The half-tracks had almost no fixed radio communication units other than portable ones, so the entire 17th Battalion used the same frequency.

== Battle ==
At 08:00 the Golani forces started making their way up the road from Masada to Majdal Shams and from there to the lower ski lift. Their movement coincided with a heavy Syrian shelling aimed at the road crossing Majdal Shams, but most of the shells landed between the houses and the ridges above it, did not hit the forces and did not interrupt their advance. The column was headed by the two tanks, followed by the 51st Battalion Company B's half-tracks, the reconnaissance half-tracks and finally the 17th Battalion half-tracks. When the 51st Battalion column reached 1,500 meters from the village, where the road crosses the dirt road ascending from Neve Ativ (33.287°N 35.753°E), the column stopped. The fighters dismounted and organized for a climb up the ridge. The tanks, Drori's command post and the 17th Battalion forces kept slowly driving up the road. At about 08:15, right before the climb, Peled briefed his Company B's commander and the reconnaissance deputy commander about the mission. The communication was conducted on the battalion frequency, and only Peled had another radio unit tuned to the brigade frequency. After several minutes, they began moving in the following order: the reconnaissance force of thirty-three soldiers under the deputy company commander, Lieutenant Shaul Lev, moved first on the path climbing up the ridge. The leading force moved on the ridge east of the path, on which the rest of the force moved. A few dozen meters behind the reconnaissance force was the command post. About 200 meters behind it the command post were columns of Company B, under Lieutenant Dov Schechter's command, with fifty-six soldiers. The battalion collecting station under Lieutenant Doctor Sidi Yehezkel was last.

During the climb, Syrian artillery shells kept falling. Drori ordered the forces to try and spot the Syrians while moving. The sky was clouded with medium-strength wind. Every once in a while, a low cloud passed, narrowing the sight. At around 09:45, after an hour and a half's climb up the ascent, when the lead force reached about 350 meters from the foot of Hill 1614, the Syrian 183rd Commando Battalion deployed on the hill opened fire. Soon, several soldiers were hit. The battle continued until around 16:00, with Peled first trying to flank the Syrians from the right (east) with a reduced Company B. The flanking failed, and the company medical aidman was killed and three fighters wounded during the retreat. After that, a platoon was sent to flank from the west, again covered by the reconnaissance company, but the commander was killed and the force retreated. From the "tank curve" Drori sent down the Hermon mountainside a force of sixteen soldiers under the 17th Battalion Company B deputy commander, Lieutenant Moti Rosen, to attack the Syrian force from behind. The force succeeded in sneaking up the Syrians undetected and opened fire, causing many casualties but one of its soldiers was killed and three wounded. At around 12:30 the 51st Battalion started getting artillery support from a 334th Battalion 155mm self-propelled gun deployed near Bukata. At about 14:30, under artillery cover, the battalion charged the Syrian force from southwest and captured high point 1614, chasing away the last Syrians left on it. The Company B commander was wounded in the charge. Meanwhile, the battalion was ordered to retreat to the "bus parking" due to the 17th Battalion's failed attack near the upper ski lift. In the battle of high point 1614 four Israeli soldiers were killed and thirteen wounded. The IDF estimated the Syrian casualties at twenty killed and an unknown number of wounded.

While the 51st Battalion was climbing up the Hermon mountainside, the motorized column with two tanks kept advancing up the road toward the outpost. The tanks were followed by the 17th Battalion forces in the following order: Company C, under Captain Yaakov Sela, the reconnaissance company's squad commanders course company, totaling at thirty-three soldiers on three half-tracks. The fourth half-track was the 17th Battalion commander's command post. Drori's command half-track, followed by Company B, with eighty soldiers on seven half-tracks. The brigade doctor, Captain Doctor Shraga Myblum, with two paramedics from the brigade infirmary, joined one of the half-tracks. The advance was uneventful until the lower ski-lift position. The tanks deployed in the parking lot south of the ski lift and fired at the constructions, which were empty since the 13th Battalion soldiers left them on Sunday. The constructions were searched and it turned out the Syrians did not reach them. The Israeli flag was removed to be hoisted on the outpost after its recapture. A tracked bulldozer belonging to a contractor who had worked on the upper ski lift was started on Drori's order and attached to the column in case a roadblock was needed. At 09:20, Drori reported to NC that he had passed the lower ski lift and was heading toward the upper ski lift.

The Syrian blocking commander spotted the Israeli motorized column as it passed the "bus park". He briefed his men to the possibility of an assault and reported to the 82nd Battalion commander on its advance. Due to the terrain and low visibility that morning, the column was unseen by him until it reappeared as it ascended from the lower ski lift on its way to the "tank curve". When the Israeli column reached the sharp curve where the road crosses Wadi Guvta, about 750 meters from the "tank curve", the B-10 RCL team fired at it. The two shells missed and exploded on the wadi slope. Only the 17th Battalion commander's command post returned fire in the general direction, since no one identified its source. The column kept moving until the two tanks and the two Company C half-tracks passed the "tank curve" and stopped about 100 meters to its north. It stopped there in order to disembark a force from Company C to scan the ridge and secure its flank. A force commanded by the Company B commander was also left there to assist the 51st Battalion, after being personally briefed by Drori. While the motorized column was heading toward the "tank curve", at 09:30 a pair of IAF aircraft from Squadron 110 attacked the Syrian forces on the Hermon. The planes had been waiting for a long time over northern Israel. A Strela missile was fired at one of them, but missed. The aerial attack was not coordinated with Drori, and he was not updated when it took place. At that time the sky was very clouded, and the planes may have attacked the Syrian Hermon.

At around 10:00, while the 51st Battalion's leading force was exchanging fire with the Syrian force on high point 1614, and the Company B deputy commander force started moving down the range to assist the battalion, Dror ordered the Company C commander to ascend on foot to on the dirt road with two teams from his company from the "tank curve" up the ridge above the road leading to the upper ski lift, to secure the motorized column's flank, which was planned to arrive from behind. About twenty-two soldiers including the company commander started moving on for on the dirt road leading through the ridgeline toward high point 2072. At that time, low clouds began to cover the landscape, and visibility was limited to a few dozen meters. A team under a platoon commander deployed right of the ridgeline and another team was deployed left of it. The company commander moved with another soldier in the center, slightly behind. After a few minutes of climb, when the first team had ascended about 200 meters up the ridge, and ahead the terrain was starting to slant, the leading force suddenly spotted below and to the right a group of ten to fifteen soldiers on the move. When they identified them as Syrians, they ran to capture the commanding area. The Syrians were also running there while opening fire. The Syrians charged several times while throwing grenades at the Israeli force, who took cover. In a very short range encounter, the Syrians were stopped and lost several soldiers. Another Syrian contingent, already located in hidden positions inside a commanding mound, fired RPG-7 shells and accurate sniper fire at them. The Israeli force was caught in a crossfire and could not advance. The Israelis were completely exposed and could not raise their heads. The Syrian force was the counterattack force of the 82nd Battalion commander with about twenty soldiers. They were armed with AK-47s, RPD submachine guns, RPG antitank weapons, antitank grenades and hand grenades. The battalion commander sent it after the blocking force reported that the motorized Israeli column had reached the "tank curve". It took positions in a rocky mound about 500 meters north of the "tank curve", commanding the string of mines the Syrians had laid on the road two days earlier.

Since the encounter the two Company C teams were practically separate. The commander of the first team and its sergeant moved upfront with about half the team, got into a battle with a small Syrian force and were wounded. The Syrians charged at them but were stopped, mostly by the team's machine gunner, who was killed in the battle. When their ammunition started to run out, the first team retreated. The dead soldier was left on the spot. Meanwhile, the company commander tried to advance with the rest of the first team, but was wounded twice during the advance. He asked for artillery support, but was denied. When he felt he was losing control of the battle, he asked for permission to retreat. His request was approved after about an hour and fifteen minutes of fighting. The second team moved between the ridgeline and the road and heard the fire aimed at the first team. The commander and his sergeant moved ahead to look for the source of the fire. After about 100 meters up the ridge, they too drew fire from the rocks commanding the road. They called the team to join them and started moving, covering each other, until they spotted Syrian soldiers firing and throwing grenades at both the half-tracks on the road and the first team. The commander, the sergeant and the machine gunner charged, and entered the Syrian formation. In a very short range battle they succeeded in killing and wounding approximately ten Syrians, but the commander and two soldiers were killed and their bodies were left on the spot. The sergeant and the other soldiers kept charging northward and arrived at the western slopes of Hill 2072, where they exchanged fire at medium range with the Syrians located on the slopes. After a while the team began to retreat toward the "tank curve", evacuating the wounded. Two soldiers who were killed could not be evacuated were left on the spot due to the Syrian fire. Because of the debacle and the fact that the commanders were hit, the battalion frequency became disorderly, with hysterical reports of casualties and requests for assistance. The commanders switched to the brigade frequency and could not understand the actual situation. The artillery officer's request for artillery support to aid the 17th Battalion was answered a few shells at the upper ski lift, before the battery was moved to a different sector. At about 11:30 Drori authorized the Company C force to retreat to the "tank curve". Out of the twenty-two company soldiers who ascended the ridge, four were killed and nine wounded. The four dead bodies were left on the spot, on Drori's permission. The wounded were evacuated to the "tank curve" and then taken by half-tracks to the brigade medical corps company deployed west of Masada.

While the two Company C teams were fighting up the range leading to high point 2072, Drori ordered Dror to take his tanks and Company B on half-tracks toward the upper ski lift. The string of mines laid on the road and the Syrian blocking force stopped them. Dror, his Intelligence officer and the 334th Battalion artillery officer were killed during the mine clearing, and the brigade doctor and operations officer were wounded. After the mines were cleared, the two tanks and three half-tracks moved ahead, under the command of Captain Aryeh Peled. About 500 meters after the "tank curve", the Syrian blocking force fired antitank and sniper fire at the Israelis, and stopped them. Eight Company B soldiers were killed and many wounded near the upper ski lift. A Company B platoon sent parallel to the motorized column to assist Company C was climbing the ridgeline uncoordinated with the Company C commander arrived at the lower part of Hill 2072. An attached officer and two fighters were killed and left on the spot. When Drori ordered a retreat, the rest of the platoon retreated with its wounded down the hill. Under the cover of the heavy fog, all the armored vehicles were evacuated backwards, and all the Israeli forces retreated to the tank curve, and later to the "bus park". Drori remained in the "tank curve" until the 51st Battalion stopped fighting on Hill 1613 and the Company B force got there. The Brigade Training Base staff company was ordered to stay around Masada, but followed the column up to the lower ski lift. It retreated to the "bus park" along with the others. Only the 12th Battalion command post and his Company A, who were ordered during the battle to reinforce the motorized column, remained at the "tank curve" until about 16:15.

== Aftermath ==
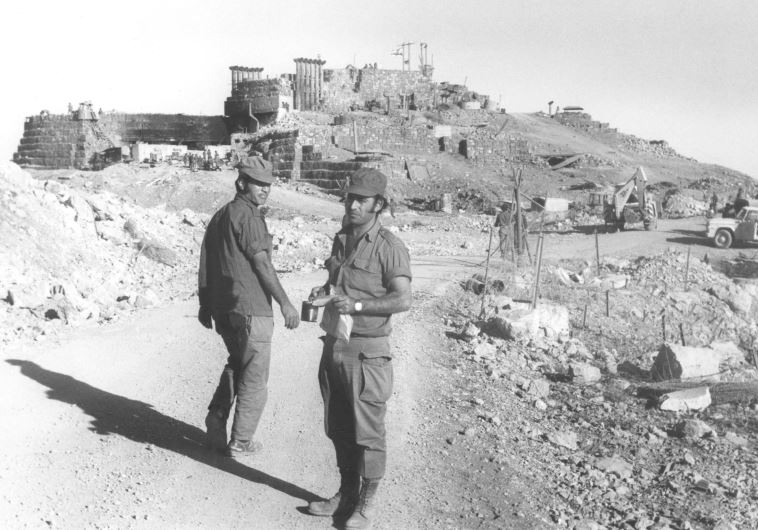
Israeli soldiers after the recapture of their outpost in the Syrian part of Mount Hermon, October 1973.

The Israeli objective, recapturing the outpost and rescuing the soldiers trapped in it, was not achieved. The Israelis lost twenty-three killed and fifty-five wounded. Four bodies were left on the spot: one was left on Drori's approval, and the three who died attacking Hill 2072 were only known to be absent at the convention at Banias. The bodies of four reconnaissance soldiers were left on Drori's approval due to the Syrian fire. The Syrian 82nd Battalion suffered two killed and four wounded at the blocking force, and the reinforcement had at least seven dead and seven wounded, including three wounded officers. The 183rd Battalion had twenty killed. The Hermon remained in Syrian hands until it was recaptured by Israel in Operation Dessert on October 22.
