= Moston, Shropshire =

Hamlet in Shropshire, England

Coordinates: 52°50′04″N 2°39′12″W

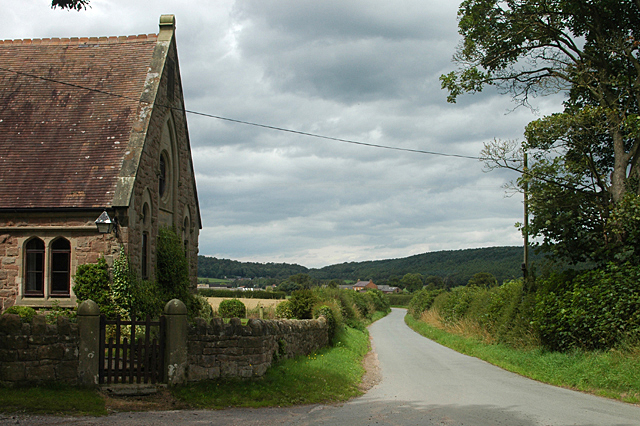
Lane to Moston

Moston is a hamlet in North Shropshire, England, about 10 miles or 16 km north-east of Shrewsbury.

In 1870–72, John Marius Wilson's Imperial Gazetteer of England and Wales described Moston as follows:

"MOSTON, a township in Stanton-upon-Hineheath parish, Salop; on the river Roden, 3¼ miles ESE of Wem. Pop., 61."
