= Mount Hermon, Cornwall =

Hamlet in Cornwall, England

Coordinates: 49.996°N 5.210°W

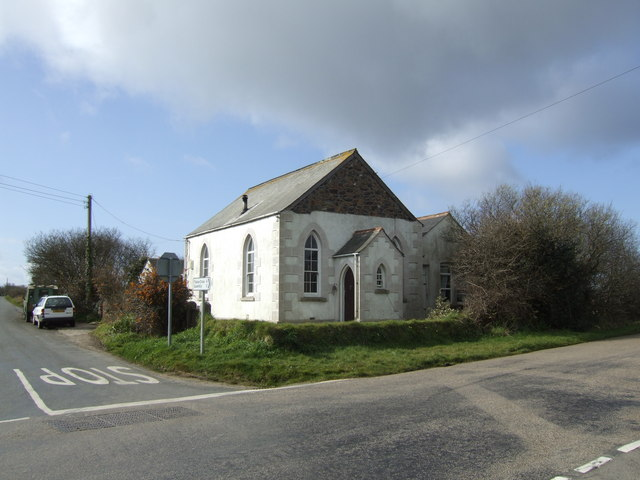
A converted chapel at Mount Hermon

Mount Hermon is a hamlet in the parish of Grade-Ruan in Cornwall, England. It is situated to the east of the A3083 road from Helston to Lizard. There is a round barrow situated to the north east of the houses. There was formerly a chapel, marked as Ebenezer Chapel (Bible Christian) on the 1879 map, but this has been converted into accommodation, and is now called Ebenezer Cottage.
