= Third Battle of Mount Hermon =

1973 battle of the Yom Kippur War

- Part of the Yom Kippur War
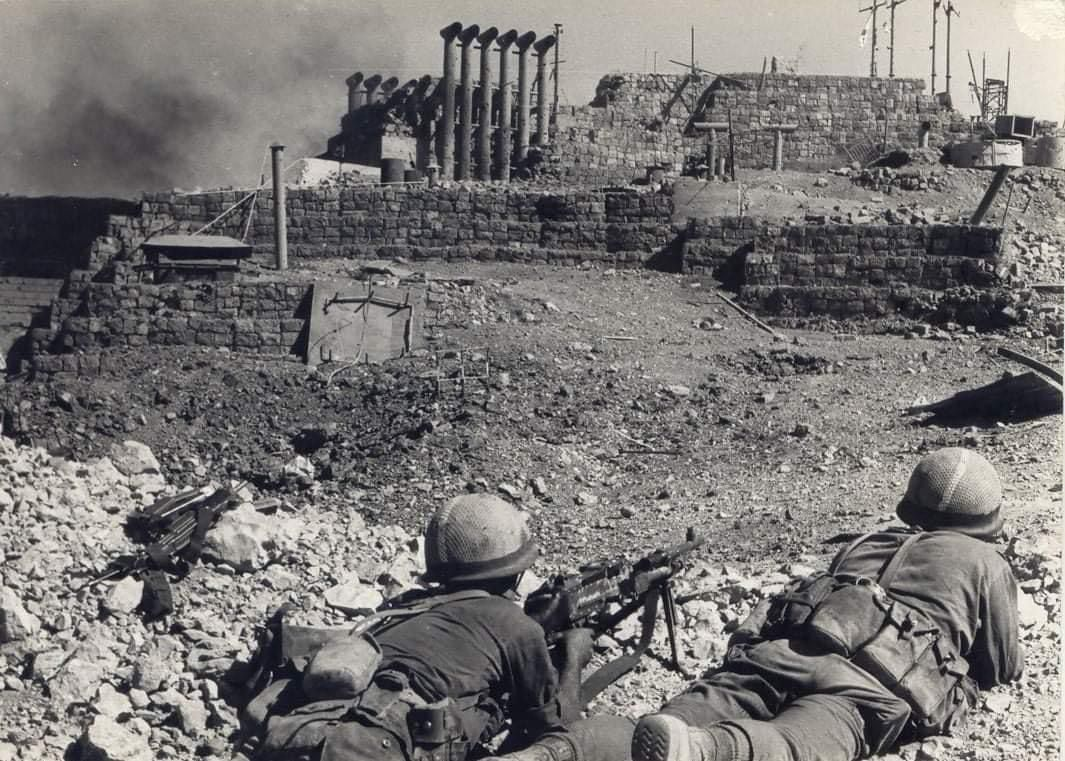
- Israeli soldiers during the battle
Date	October 21–22, 1973
Location	Mount Hermon 33°18′16″N 35°47′51″E
Result	Israeli victory
Territorial changes	Israel recaptures Mount Hermon

Belligerents
Israel	Syria

Commanders and leaders
Amir Drori (Israeli outpost); Haim Nadel (Syrian outpost); Shmaryahu Winnik †	Ahmed Rifai al-Joju (Israeli outpost); Mustafa Sharba (executed)

Strength
~400 soldiers (Israeli outpost); ~600 (Syrian outpost)	1 commando battalion (~400 soldiers)

Casualties and losses
56 killed 83 wounded	120 killed 100 wounded Several captured 7 aircraft destroyed
- Location within the Golan Heights

The Third Battle of Mount Hermon was fought on the night of October 21–22, 1973, between the Israeli Army and the Syrian Army over Mount Hermon, during the last days of the Yom Kippur War. Syrian troops had captured the IDF outpost on the mountain on October 6, and held it for two weeks. In the third battle, codenamed Operation Dessert (Hebrew: מבצע קינוח, Mivtza Kinu'ah), Israeli troops captured the Israeli outpost and the Syrian one.

== Background ==
After losing control of Mount Hermon on October 6 and failing to recapture it on October 8, the IDF, and the Golani Brigade in particular, grew determined to recapture it. Its loss levied a heavy toll on Israel's intelligence gathering during the war. At 10:15 PM on October 19, Israeli Chief of Staff (Ramatkal) David Elazar was on his way to the Israeli Northern Command to monitor an attack on the Hermon. At that time, the General Staff learned of the United States Secretary of State Henry Kissinger's notification of an immediate ceasefire to the war. Elazar was asked to return to Tel Aviv, where he met with the Defense Minister, Moshe Dayan, and they agreed that recapturing the Hermon was a top priority.

Yehuda Peled, who had commanded the failed counterattack on October 8, decided that it would be best to attack from the Syrian enclave to the east, instead of from the Golan again. The 4,000 foot climb from that direction was very steep, but would bring the attacking force straight to the Israeli outpost without fighting on the ridge. The Golani commander, Amir Drori, concurred. Peled's 51st battalion was therefore posted in an abandoned Syrian village at the foot of the eastern side of the Hermon. For three nights, the battalion practiced a quick climb with full gear, and Peled concluded that the mission was possible. Elazar ordered him to take the entire crest, including the Syrian Hermon. Golani was to capture the Israeli Hermon, while a reserve paratroopers brigade, under the command of Colonel Haim Nadel, would attack the Syrian positions established before the war.

== Prelude ==
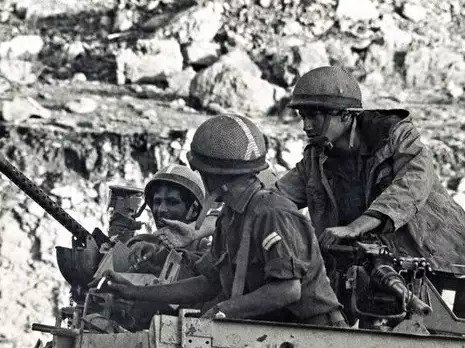
Israeli soldiers en route to Mount Hermon

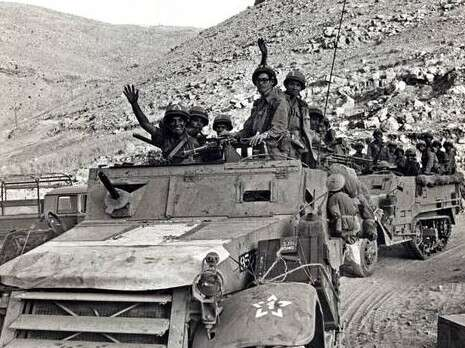
Two Israeli half-tracks ferrying soldiers to Mount Hermon

Nadel's officers suggested taking the crest and then moving down to the Israeli Hermon. Brigadier-General Yekutiel Adam, Deputy Chief of Northern Command, rejected this suggestion, saying Golani should capture the outpost it had lost. The paratroop officers suggested that Golani would attack from the east, but were rejected because the eastern slope was considered too vulnerable to Syrian artillery and too steep to safely evacuate the wounded. On the night of October 20, Drori arrived at Northern Command and was advised by a paratroop officer to change his orders. He refused.

For the two weeks before the Israeli attack, the Syrians were hiding by day, expecting an Israeli assault. Two Syrians were wounded by Israeli shelling during those two weeks. On the morning of October 21, a reconnaissance team under the command of Yoni Netanyahu climbed an adjacent spur to look at the Israeli Hermon, and reported seeing only two Syrians on the ridge the entire day. Aerial photography also failed to show any indication of Syrian forces in the outpost. That evening, 400 Golani troops gathered in a grove at the foot of the western slope. Drori told them that the Hermon was highly important, being "the eyes and ears of the country".

== Battle ==
=== Israeli Hermon ===
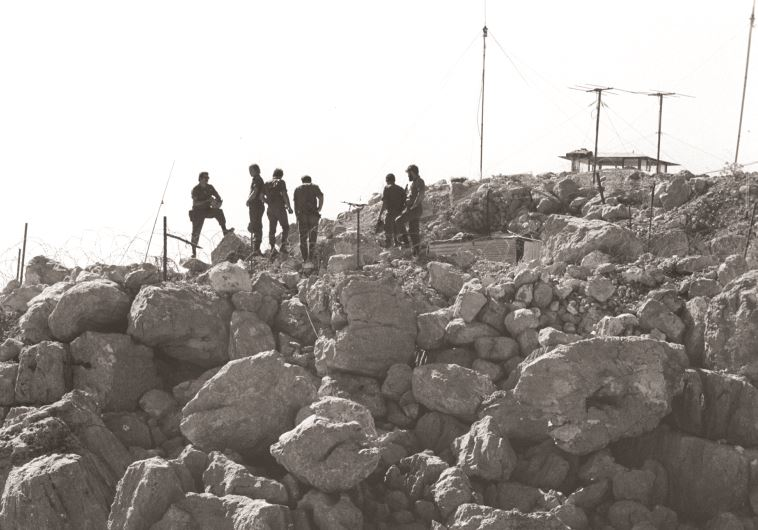
Israeli soldiers reoccupying Mount Hermon

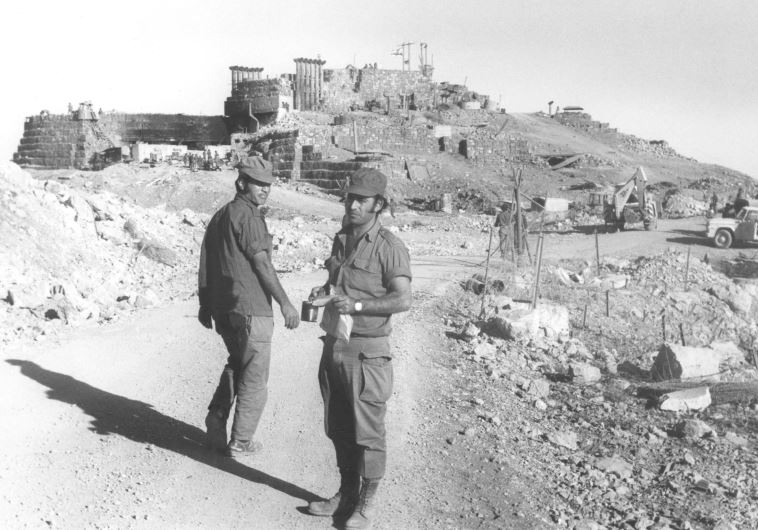
Israeli soldiers reoccupying the Hermon outpost

The battalion moved to Majdal Shams, from where it began to ascend the mountain. The reconnaissance company moved far to the left. In the middle, a motorized force led by tanks and a bulldozer prepared to move up the road to follow the two flanks. These were accompanied by artillery, firing 200 yards ahead, but it was ordered to stop when it began to hit too close to the troops. After nine hours of climbing they were two thirds of the way up, when they were hit by heavy fire. Five of the six tank commanders in the motorized force were hit by Syrian commandos lying at the side of the road. The reconnaissance company was also hit and its commander was killed. The exchange of fire took place at range of a few yards. In addition to snipers, the Syrians also used Israeli machine guns taken from the outpost after the first battle.

Several times, the Israelis mistook Syrian fire for friendly one. Peled tried to outflank the Syrians. One of his company commanders took the wrong path and turned northwest instead of northeast. He reported no enemy in sight. Peled moved forward to get a better view. Drori ordered him back, but Peled ignored him. Drori was then hit, and wanted to pass command to Peled. Peled's artillery officer and radioman were both killed. He took the radio before being hit as well. At dawn artillery was called in, and the Syrian fire began to fade. Several Syrian snipers surrendered. At 11:00 AM, a Golani officer announced that the Hermon was in Israeli hands.

=== Syrian Hermon ===
Nadel's force was airlifted to the crest by helicopters. Two battalions, totalling 606 soldiers, arrived in twenty-seven sorties. The helicopters moved through the wadis around the Syrian anti-aircraft positions, and artillery preceded the helicopters. Syrian artillery from the nearby village Arneh shelled the landing zone and seriously wounded one Israeli. Twenty-one soldiers were also landed at the summit of Mount Hermon.

By 17:25, all the Israeli paratroopers had arrived. Seven men were placed on the peak to observe. The Syrians called for seven MiGs, but these were shot down by Israeli aircraft. Two Syrian helicopters carrying reinforcements were also shot down. A Syrian ground advance from Arneh was also halted by IAF planes. The Israeli paratroopers proceeded to attack the Twists Position (Hebrew: מוצב הפיתולים, Mutzav HaPitulim), defended by 25–30 Syrians. One Israeli platoon commander and seven Syrians were killed, and the rest retreated. The Twists Position overlooked both the Syrian Hermon Position and the road to Arneh, so roadblocks and ambushes were set up around it. Israeli forces continued south, attacking the Cliff Position (Hebrew: מוצב המצוק, Mutzav HaMatsuk), with 30–40 Syrian defenders. Thanks in part to artillery support, the Israelis captured the position without suffering any casualties, killing 12 Syrians. The ambush around the Twists Position intercepted six Syrian trucks with reinforcements, capturing or destroying five.

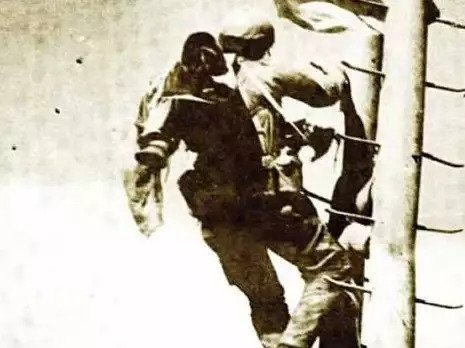
Lieutenant Eli Levin, the intelligence officer of the Golani Brigade's 51st Battalion, raises the Golani Brigade's flag on the antenna of the Hermon outpost after its recapture

At 03:00, they were overlooking the main Syrian observation post. Nadel called in artillery fire. Half an hour later, the Israeli troops attacked and discovered that the Syrian defenders had fled. At 06:00–10:00, one of the battalions moved toward the Israeli Hermon to assist the Golani troops. En route, it encountered Syrians who had escaped from the Israeli Hermon. The Israeli battalion killed some of them and took 17 others prisoner. One Israeli was killed in the shootout. The paratroopers were halfway down when they were ordered by the Northern Command to move back up.

== Aftermath ==
The Golani Brigade's casualties were 55 dead and 79 wounded. The paratroopers' casualties were one dead and four wounded. After the battle, one Golani private repeated the phrase "the eyes of the country" in an interview for the Israeli television. It has since become a common idiom for the Hermon in Israel. The Israeli conduct later came under criticism. Historian Uri Milstein argued that the planning and execution of the attack was flawed and scandalous. Thirty years after the battle, Drori rejected claims that the paratroopers' assistance was unwanted because of Golani's prestige considerations, and said that by the time the paratroopers could have arrived, they were no longer needed. After the war, the Syrian Hermon was handed back to Syria. The remainder of Mt. Hermon continues to be under Israeli control.
