= Konavade =

Village in Maharashtra

Konavade कोनवडे
- Village
- Konvade
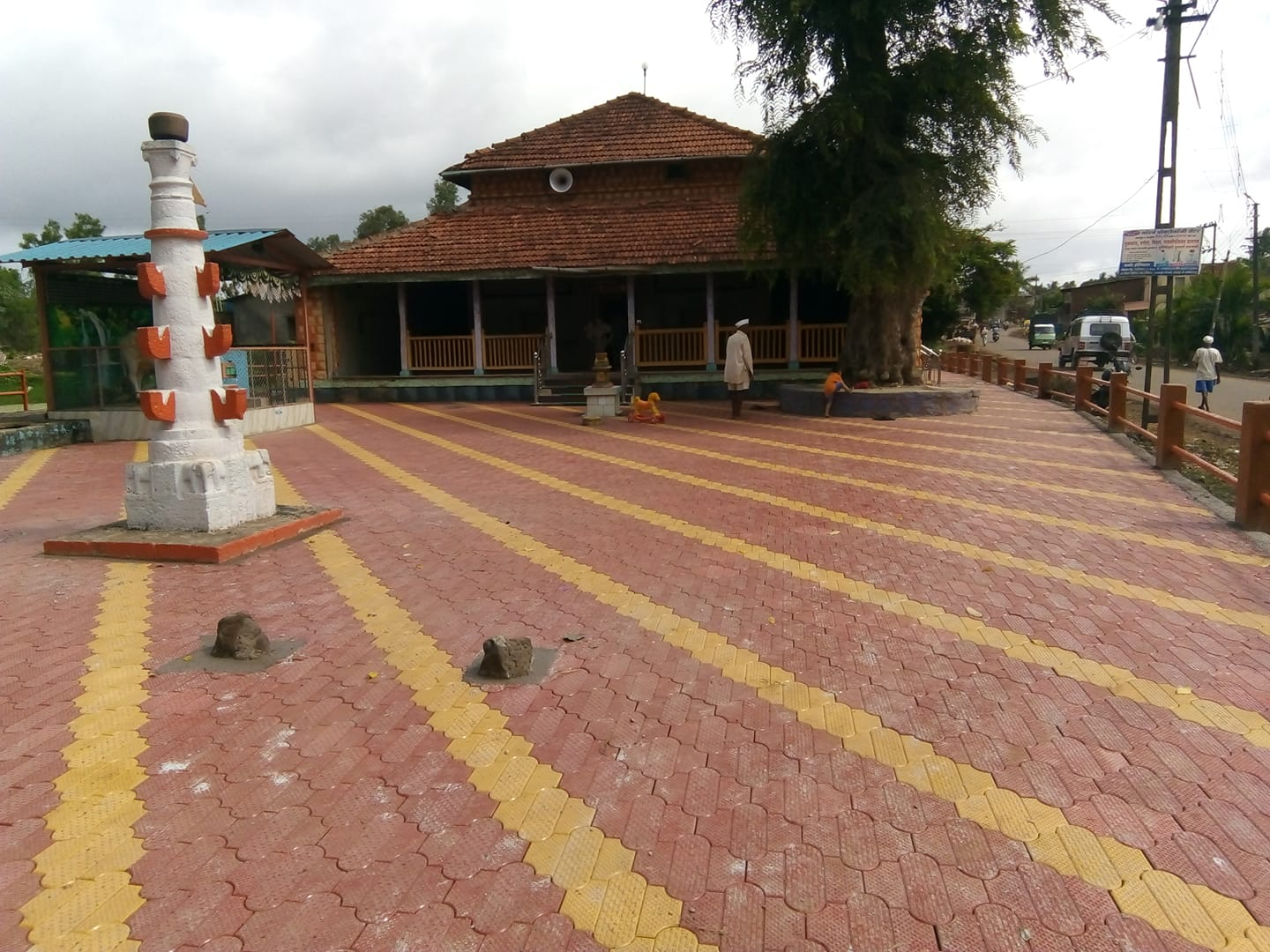
- Yamai Temple, Konavade
- Nickname: Konawade
- Location Konavade (India) Konavade (Earth)
- Coordinates: 16°22′16″N 74°8′19″E
- Country: India
- State: Maharashtra
- District: Kolhapur
- Tehsil: Bhudargad

Government
  - Type: Gram Panchayat
  - Body: Gram Panchayat, Konavade
  - Sarpanch: Mrs. Rani S. Patil
  - Vice Sarpanch: Mr. Subhash Patil (Nana)

Area
  - Total: 3.3417 km^{2} (1.2902 sq mi)
- Elevation: 545.6 m (1,790 ft)

Population (2011)
  - Total: 2,282
- Demonym: Konavdekar

Official
  - Language: Marathi
- Time zone: UTC+5:30 (IST)
- PIN: 416209
- Telephone code: 0231
- Vehicle registration: MH-09

Konavade (or Konawade) is a village in Kolhapur, Maharashtra. In ancient times, Konavade was known as Konijavada. Konavade, spelt officially as 'Konawade', is located on the banks of Vedganga, a tributary of the river Panchganga.

== History ==
The ancient name of Konavade was Konijavada. It is mentioned on a copper plate inscription found at Khasbagh Maidan, Kolhapur. This inscription dates back to the time of King Gandaraditya of the Shilahar dynasty. According to the text on this inscription, in Shaka year 1048, King Gandaraditya granted two nivartan (contemporary unit of land measurement) of land to 12 Brahmins for living and subsistence at the village Komnijavada in Kodavali division of Mirinji country. According to scholars, Mirinji country is present-day Miraj in Sangli, Kodavalli division is Kodoli near Kolhapur, and Komnijavada is the Konavade village in Bhudargad tehsil. This copper plate inscription is preserved in the Rajaram College Museum in Kolhapur.

=== Etymology ===
The modern name of the village, Konavade is an abbreviation of its ancient name Komnijavada.

== Geography ==
Konavade is situated in the southwest part of Maharashtra. Being close to the Western Ghats, locally known as Sahyadri, it is surrounded by a number of sub-ranges of the Sahyadri.

== Demographics ==
As per 2011 Census of India, the population of Konvade is 2282. The village has a lower literacy rate compared to Maharashtra as a whole. In 2011, literacy rate of Konvade was 80.95% compared to 82.34% of Maharashtra. The Male literacy stands at 90.81% while female literacy rate was 70.28%. Scheduled Castes (SC) constitutes 9.11% of the total population in Konvade. The village currently doesn't have any Scheduled Tribes (ST) population.

== Religion ==
All the inhabitants of the village follow Hinduism. Consequently, there are several temples of Hindu deities, Yamai Devi being the most prominent.

== Economy ==
Farming is the primary business of most of the residents. Fertile soil, abundance of water and use of modern farming techniques along with advanced machineries have greatly influenced the farming and have helped to attain maximum productivity. The type of climate and soil that exist in Konavade is favorable for sugarcane production, which is the primary crop here. The abundant availability of water and well-spread irrigation enables farmers to take more than one crop per year which is usually rice followed by sugarcane or groundnuts.

Animal husbandry is a common practice among the residents and as a side business, it helps the people to earn some extra income.
