= Konal, Maharashtra, India =

Rural village in Maharashtra

Konal
- Village
- Interactive map of Konal
- Coordinates: 15.849°N 73.867°E
- Country: India
- State: Maharashtra
- District: Sindhudurg
- Taluka: Dodamarg

Population (2011)
  - Total: 2,070
- Time zone: UTC+5:30 (IST)

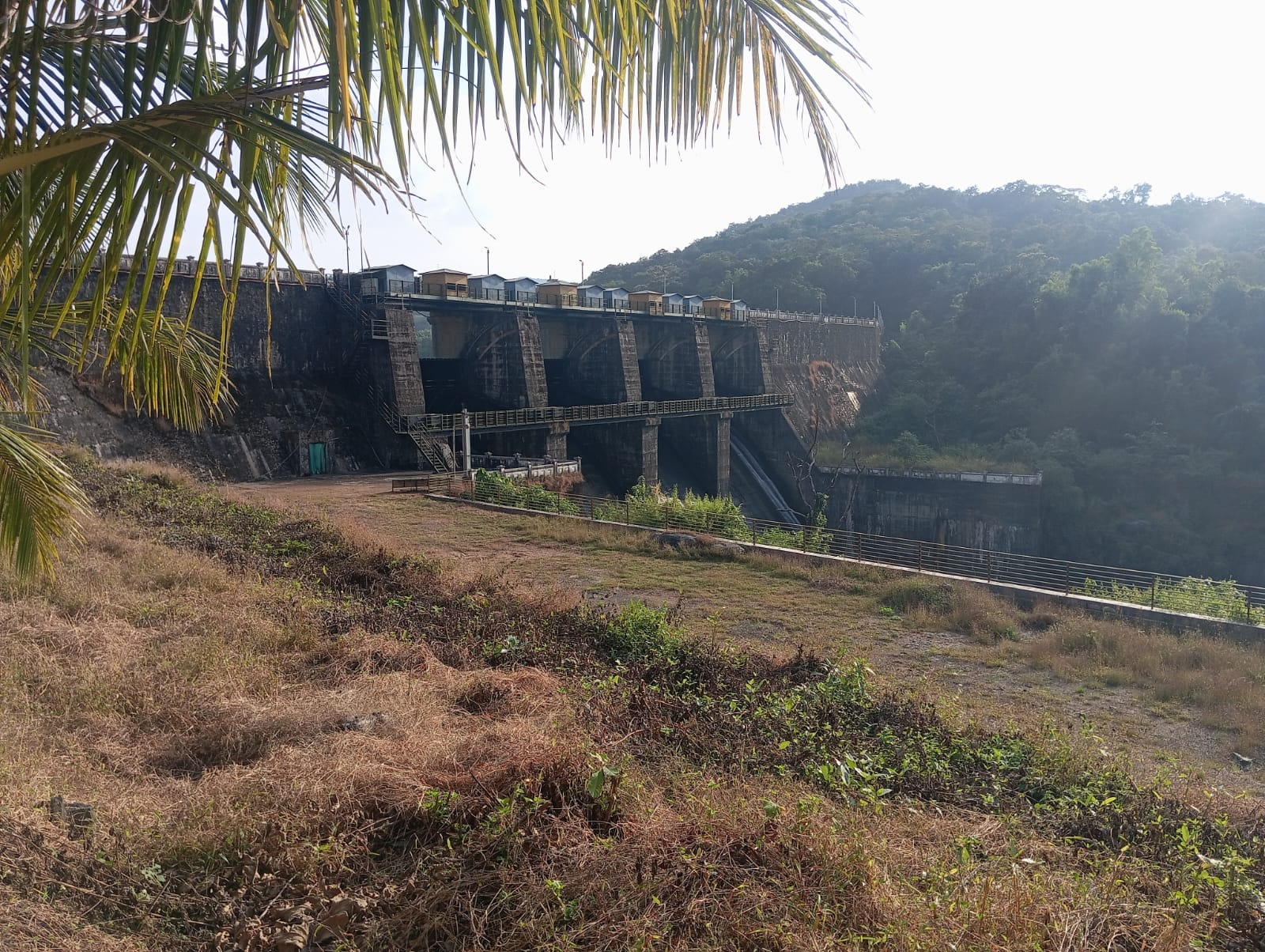
कालवा गेट

Konal is a rural village in the Dodamarg taluka of Sindhudurg district in Maharashtra, India. The village lies close to the Western Ghats.

== Geography ==
Konal village is situated on the banks of the Tilari River. The surrounding area consists of hills, dense forests, and a rich natural environment filled with biodiversity. The Tillari (Forebay) Dam, one of the major water sources in Dodamarg taluka, is a popular tourist attraction in the region.

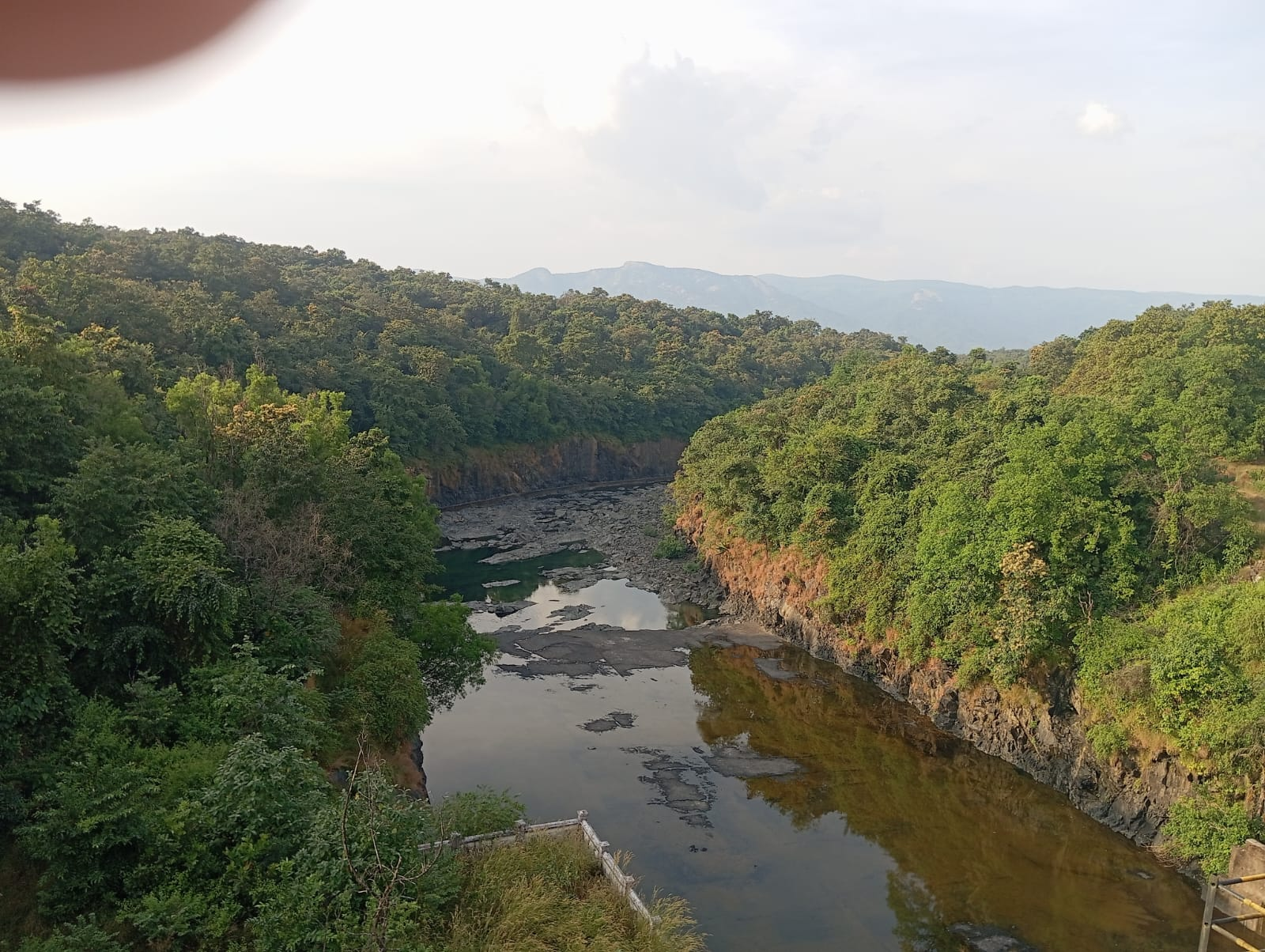
पुच्छ कालवा

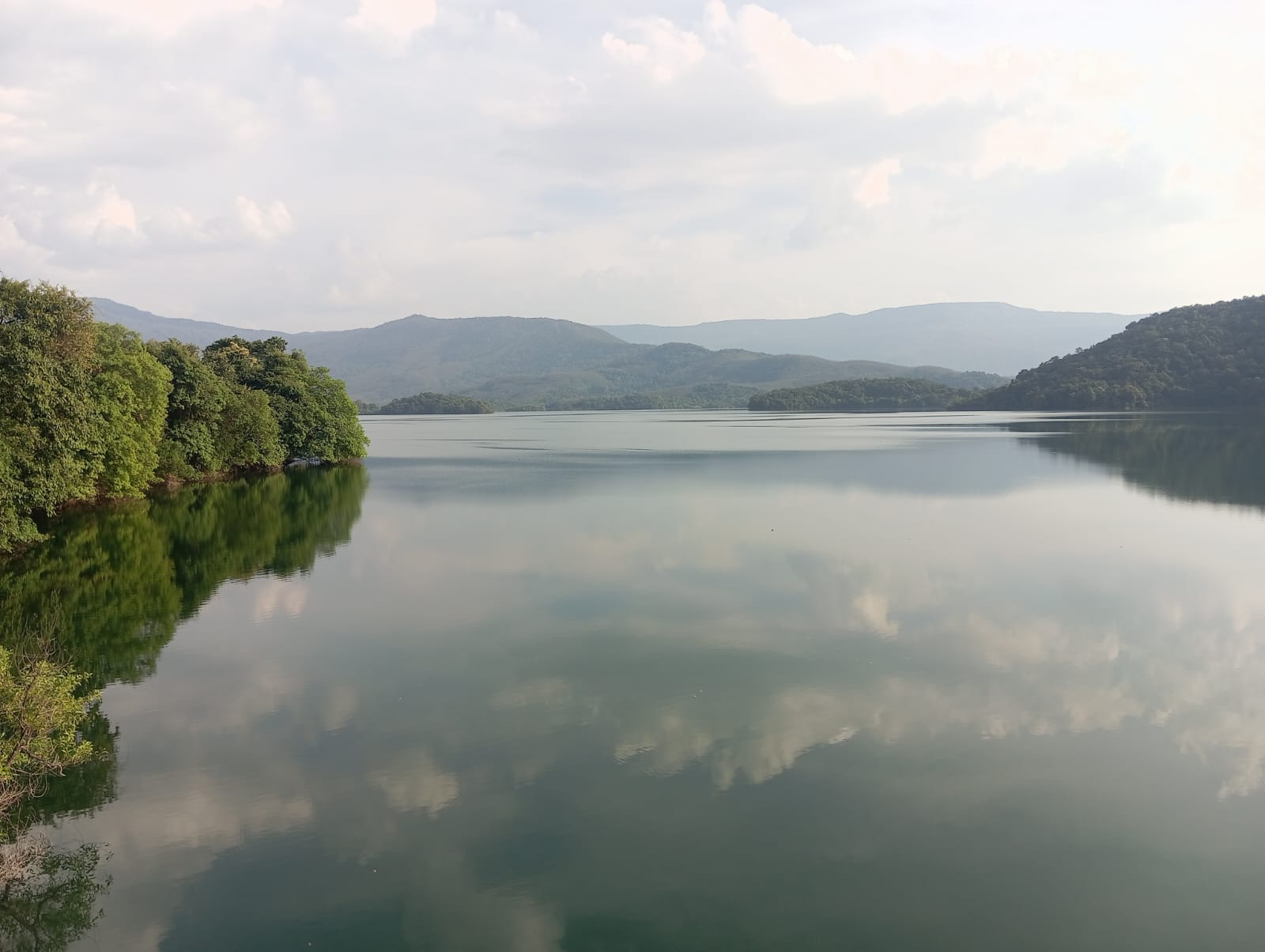
धरण जलाशय

== Administration ==
The local governance of the village is handled by the Gram Panchayat Konal. The Gram Panchayat manages water supply, sanitation, roads, local amenities, and various rural development activities.

== Demographics ==
According to the 2011 Census of India, Konal has a total population of 2,070, with an almost equal number of males and females.

== Economy ==
Agriculture, horticulture, and animal husbandry are the primary occupations in Konal. Major crops include rice, finger millet, cashew, coconut, betel nut, and banana. The cashew-processing industry in Sindhudurg district provides employment opportunities to local farmers.

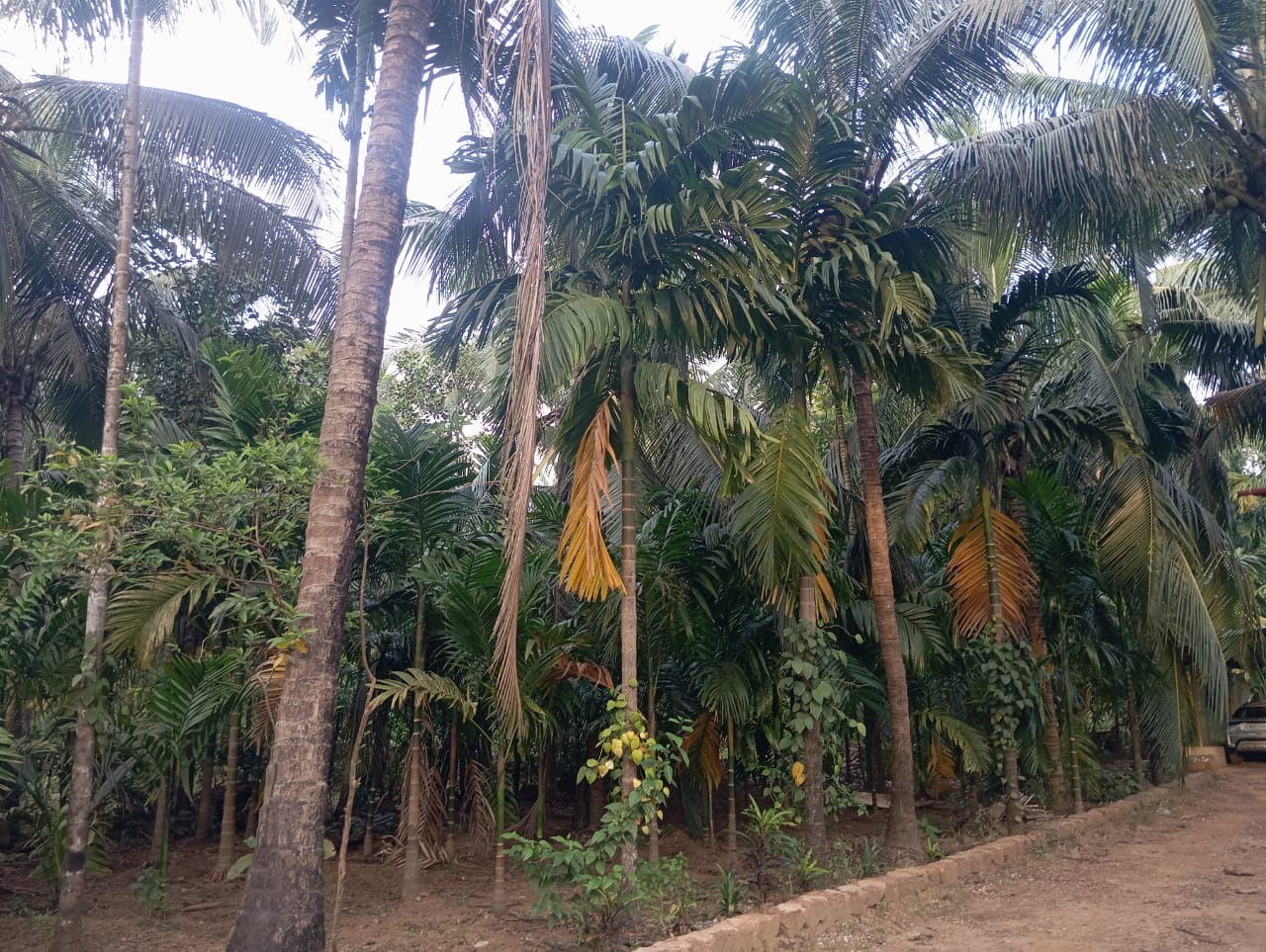
नारळ बाग

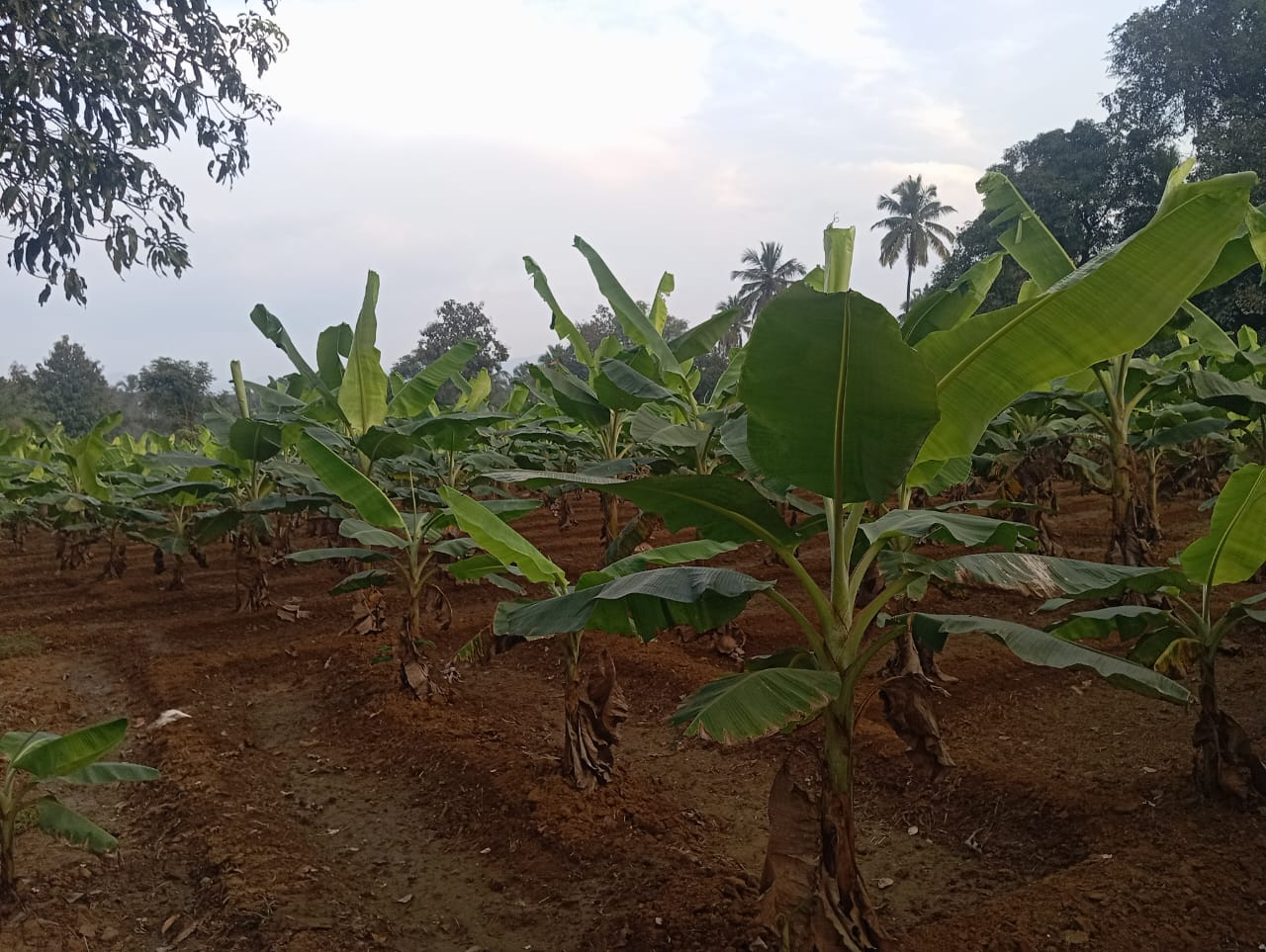
केळी बाग

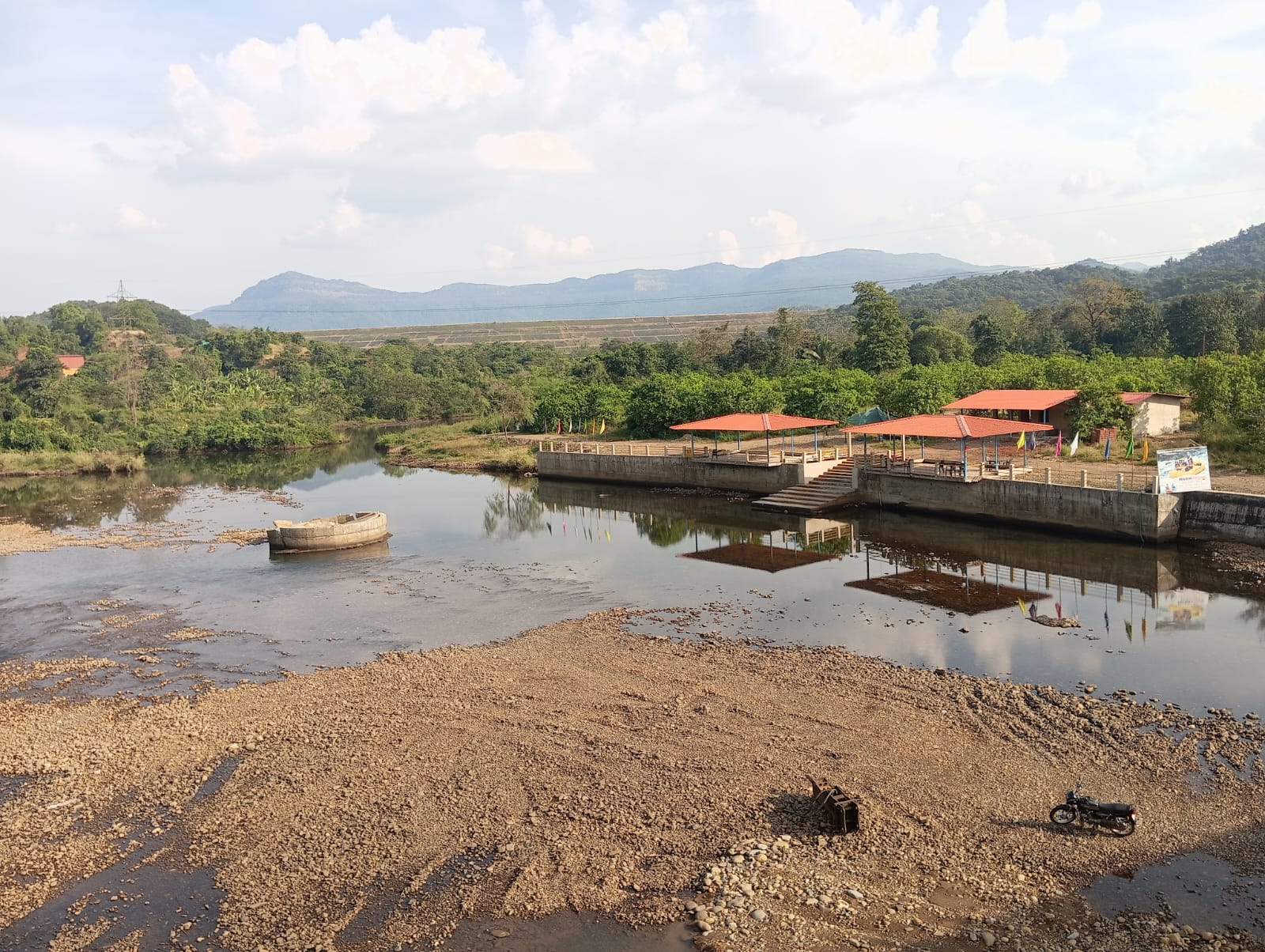
राफटिंग

== Wildlife and environment ==
The surroundings of the village are rich in biodiversity. The Tilari Canyon Wildlife Corridor is an important forested region near the village and is home to species such as Indian bison (gaur), sambar deer, foxes, monitor lizards, and a variety of birds and plants.

== Education ==
The village has a primary school, and nearby areas have access to high school education. Basic educational facilities are available for students in and around the village.

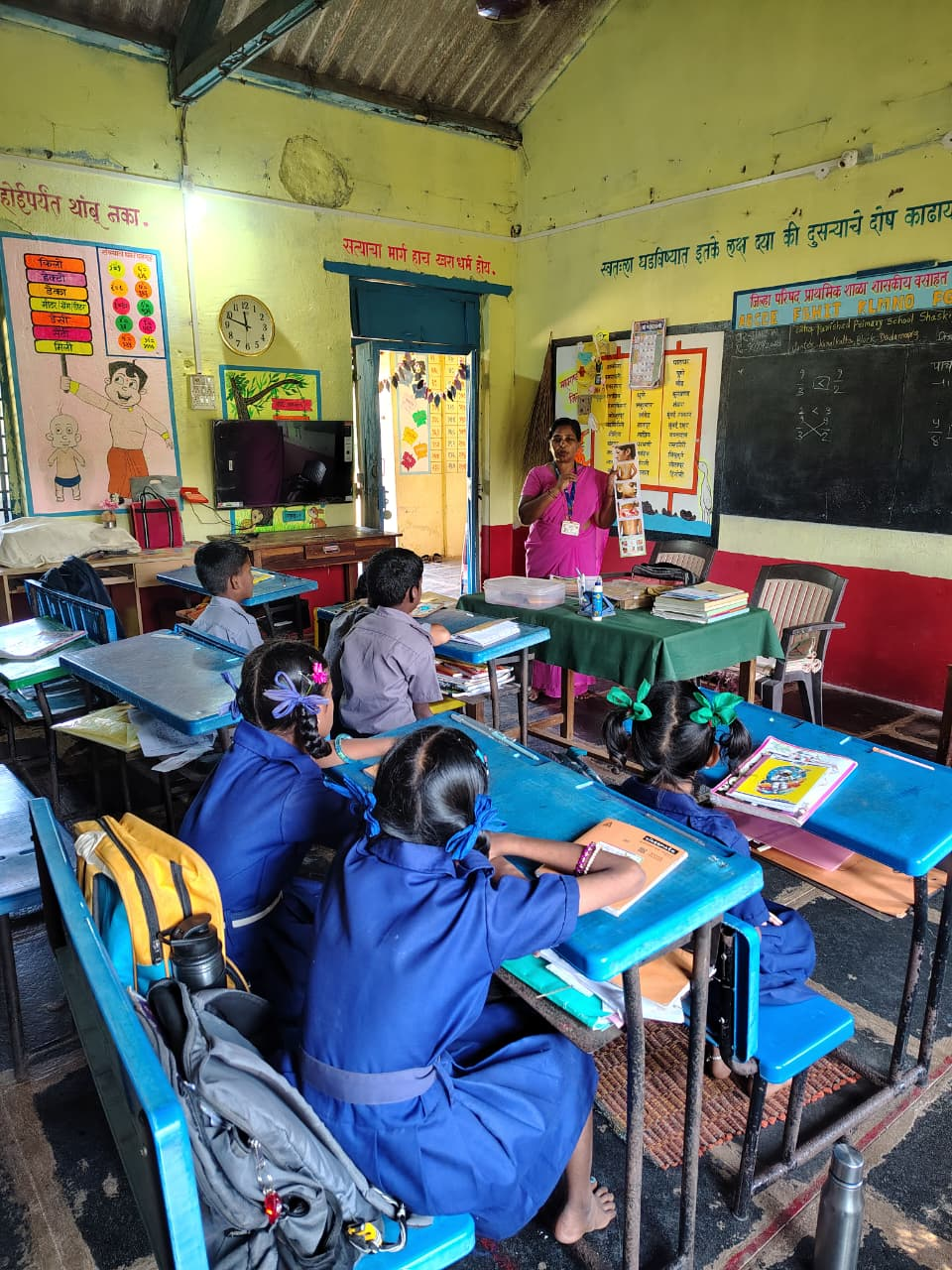
स्टुडेंट

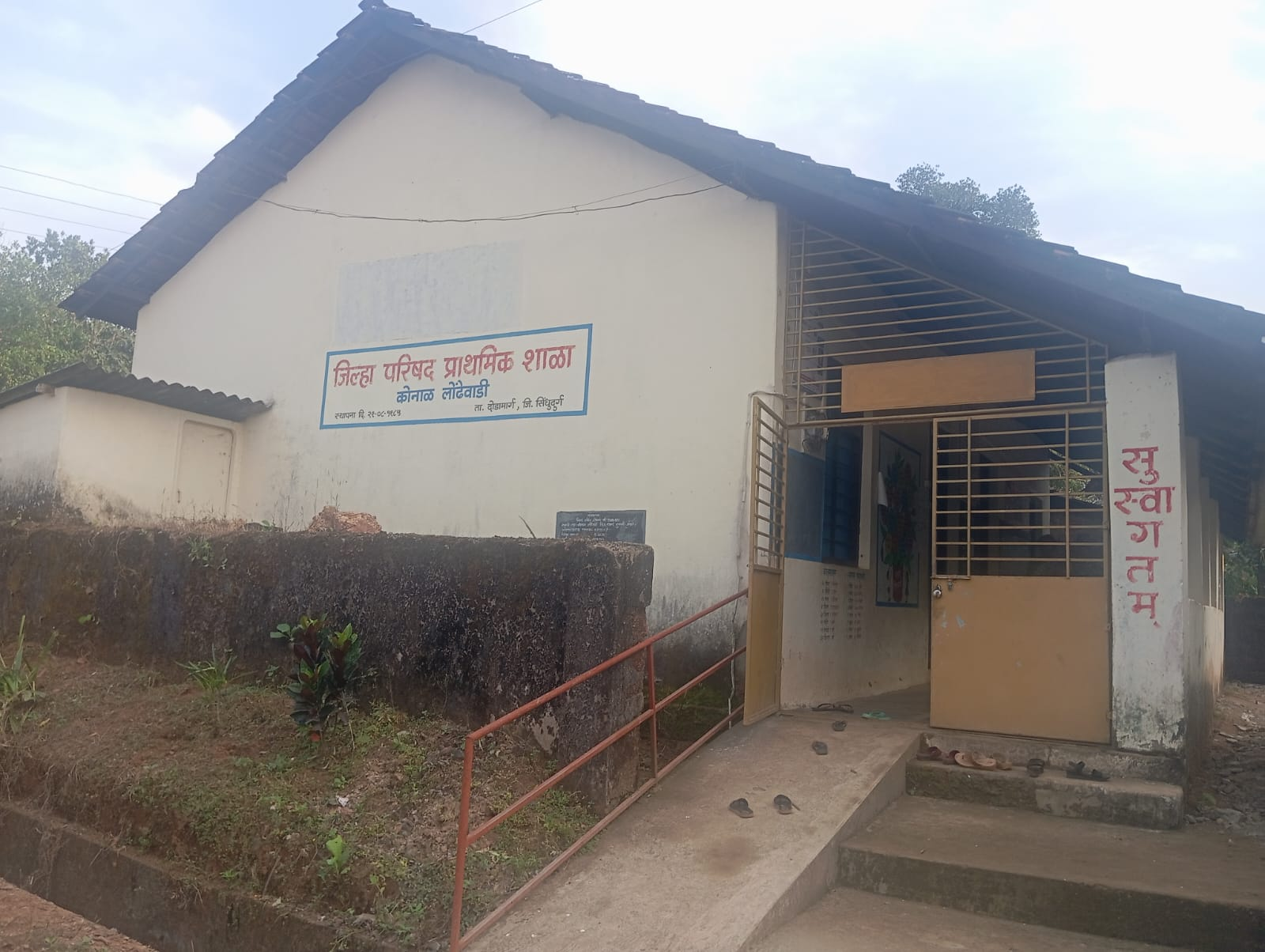
शाळेची इमारत

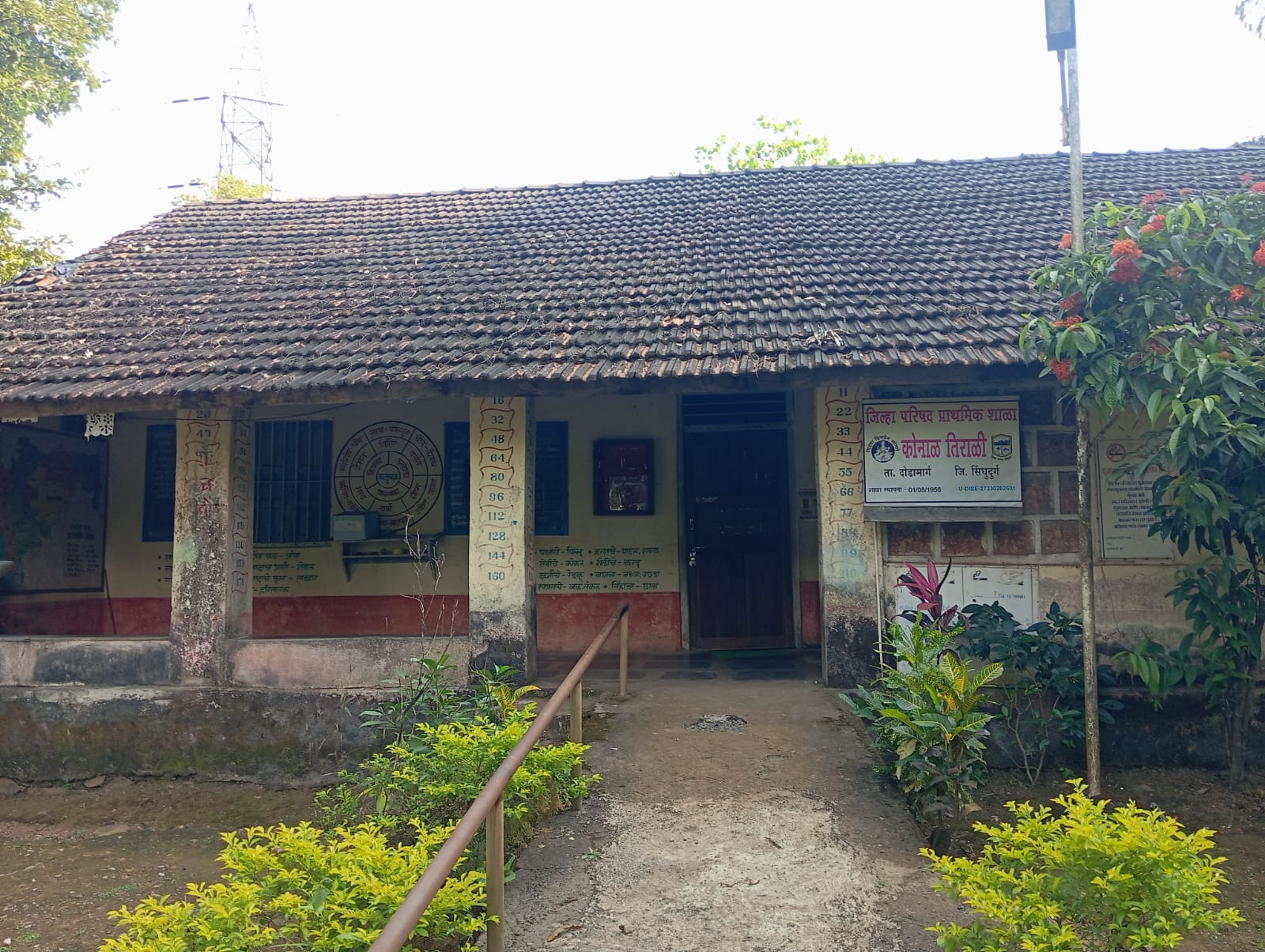
कोनाळ शाळा

== Culture ==
Konal village has temples dedicated to deities such as khanderay bhavani mandir, Bhootnath, Ganapati, and Hanuman. Annual fairs, Navaratri celebrations, bhajan events, and traditional cultural programs strengthen social harmony among the villagers.

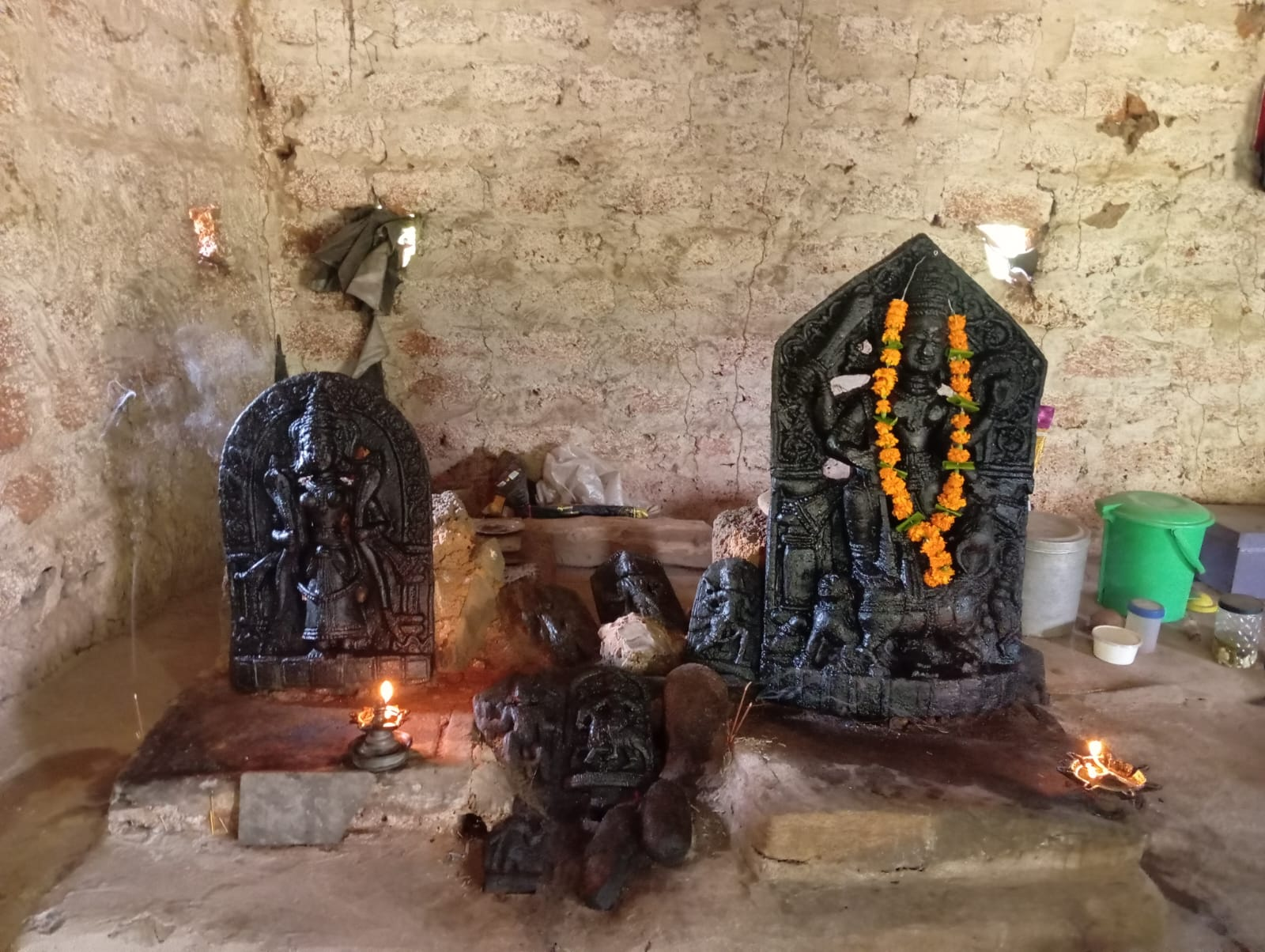
ग्रामदेवता सतेरी भूतनाथ

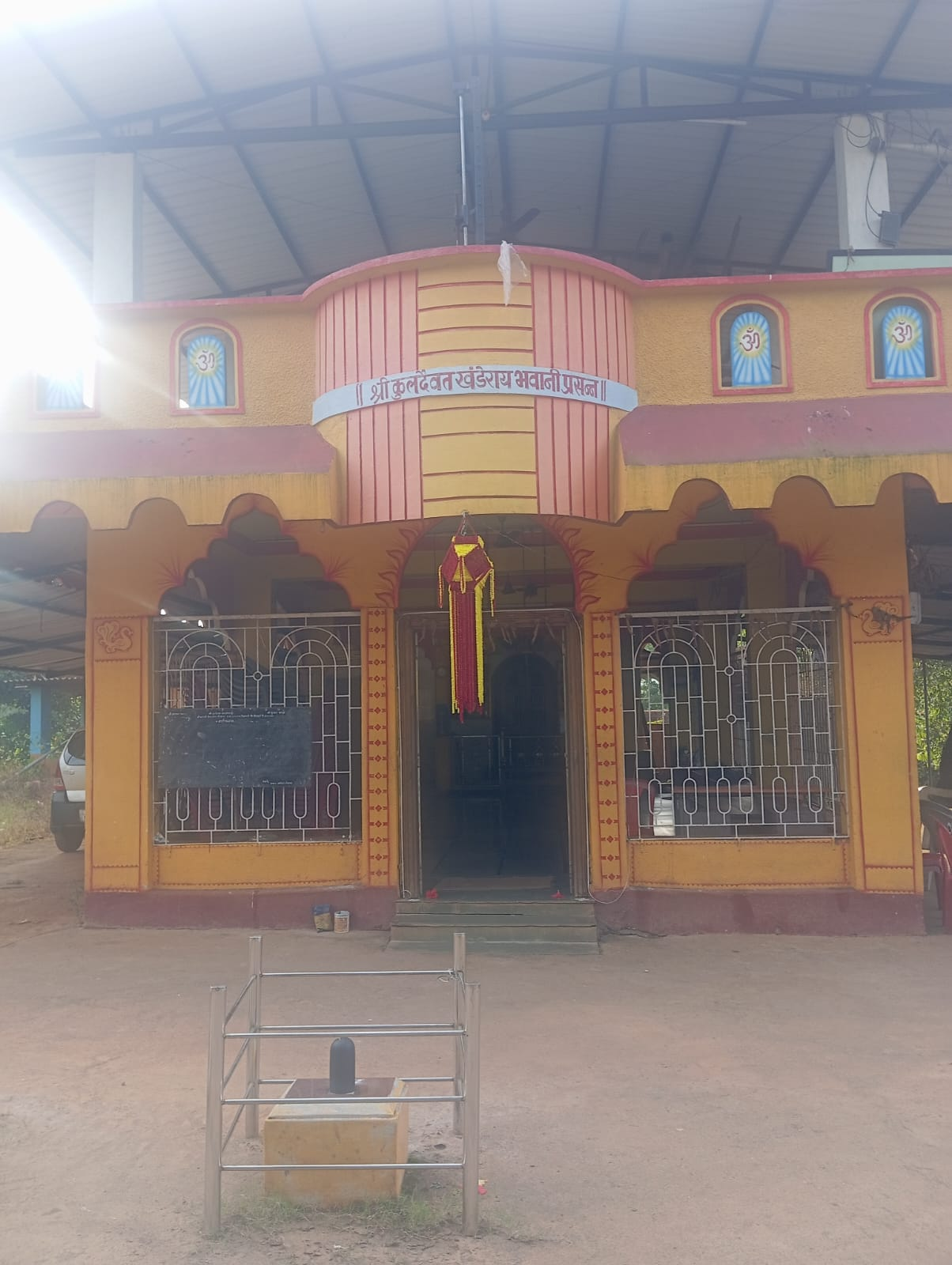
खंडेराया भवानी
