= Anant Sadashiv Altekar =

Indian historian, archaeologist, and numismatist (1898–1960)

- Born: 24 September 1898; Mhakave, Kolhapur district, Bombay Presidency (now part of Maharashtra)
- Died: 25 November 1960 (aged 62); Pune, Maharashtra, India

Academic background
- Education: Deccan College

Academic work
- Discipline: Historian
- Institutions: Banaras Hindu University; Patna University

Anant Sadashiv Altekar (24 September 1898 – 25 November 1960) was a historian, archaeologist, and numismatist from Maharashtra, India. He was the Manindra Chandra Nandy's Professor and Head of the Department of Ancient Indian History and Culture at Banaras Hindu University in Varanasi, India, and later the director of the Kashi Prasad Jayaswal Research Institute and University Professor of Ancient Indian History and Culture at the Patna University, both in Patna, India.

== Early life ==
Anant Sadashiv Altekar was born into a Deshastha Rigvedi Brahmin family on 24 September 1898 in Mhakave, a village in Kolhapur district, Maharashtra.

== Work in archeology ==
In 1936, at the invitation of the local government, he conducted an archaeological and historical survey of Kotah, and made many discoveries there, including the excavation of many old forts and temples; the most important of his discoveries from this expedition were three stone pillars dated to the year 295 of the Vikrama Era (AD 238), the second-oldest Vikrama inscriptions known. From 1951 to 1955 he led another excavation at Kumhrar, under the auspices of the Jayaswal Institute; his discoveries there confirmed the theories of David Brainard Spooner that the site, which Altekar described as "probably the earliest huge stone-pillared structure to be built by Indian architects", was a relic of the Maurya Empire. On display at the Patna Museum is a casket excavated by Altekar at a Buddhist monastery near Vaishali in 1958, said to contain the ashes of the Buddha.

== Study of the history of education in India ==
Altekar corresponded in 1932 with Gandhi concerning Hinduism and the untouchable castes. His 1934 book Education in Ancient India provided a comprehensive review of all aspects of education in India until around AD 1200, with some additional treatment of topics up to the start of the British Raj. In his book, Altekar collected extensive historical information on education in India from Sanskrit, Brahminic, Pali and Buddhist literature, along with inscriptions and accounts by foreign travellers. He also included defects in his study in the last chapter. In the book, Altekar proposes a theory of steady decline in Indian literacy from an earlier golden age, which later scholars such as Hartmut Scharfe dismissed as "sheer phantasy". Scharfe called Altekar an apologist, that his anti-British theory may have been influenced by his participation in the freedom struggle against British colonialism in 1930s when the book was first published. Scharfe acknowledges Altekar collected useful historical information.

== Other academic projects ==
Altekar's book The Position of Women in Hindu Civilization From Prehistoric Times to the Present Day (1938) was the first historical survey of the status of women in India.

Altekar's other books include

- The Vakataka-Gupta Age,
- State and Government in Ancient India,
- Rāshṭrakūṭas and their times,
- History of Benares,
- and several books on Gupta coinage.

In 1947 Altekar was elected the first chairman of the Numismatic Society of India, and in 1960 the Journal of the Numismatic Society of India published a commemorative volume in his honour. Altekar also chaired the All India Oriental Conference in 1958.
