= Shirol taluka =

Shirol Taluka
- taluka
- Interactive map of Shirol Taluka
- Country: India
- State: Maharashtra
- Division: Pune Division
- District: Kolhapur District
- Headquarters: Shirol
- Time zone: UTC+05:30 (IST)
- Major highways: NH-4

Shirol taluka is located in Kolhapur district, Maharashtra, India with its headquarters in Shirol.
