= Karveer Mahatmya =

Karveer Mahatmya is a religious/mythological scripture containing stories about the religious place Karvir, which is the present day city of Kolhapur in the state of Maharashtra in India.

The text is a work of modern era and is known to be narration of Sage Agastya, from his travels to Karvir, which is also known as 'Dakshin Kashi' or the Kashi of the South. It describes the places of pilgrimage and religious significance around Karvir. It also narrates the story of the war between goddess Amba (Mahalakshmi) and demon Kolhasur. The other characters in this story are god Bhairava or Kedarnath or Jyotirlinga, goddess Tryamboli, goddess Katyayani, demon Raktabeej and demon Raktasur. It has 72 'Adhyayas' (i.e. chapters) and over 5500 Ovi (i.e. lines).
