= Kalambe Turf Thane =

- Census town
- Location in Maharashtra, India
- Coordinates: 16.6619°N 74.2116°E
- Country: India
- State: Maharashtra
- District: Kolhapur

Population (2001)
  - Total: 8,691

Languages
  - Official: Marathi
- Time zone: UTC+5:30 (IST)

Kalambe Turf Thane is a census town in Kolhapur district in the Indian state of Maharashtra.

== Demographics ==
As of 2001 India census, Kalambe Turf Thane had a population of 8691. Males constitute 53% of the population and females 47%. Kalambe Turf Thane has an average literacy rate of 71%, higher than the national average of 59.5%: male literacy is 78%, and female literacy is 63%. In Kalambe Turf Thane, 12% of the population is under 6 years of age.
