= Vanashakti =

Non-profit environmental organisation

- Vanashakti Logo
- Founded: 2006
- Founders: Meenakshi Menon, Namita Roy Ghose, Peter Armand Menon
- Type: Environmental
- Location: Mumbai, India
- Website: http://vanashakti.org/

Vanashakti is a non-profit environmental NGO based in Mumbai, Maharashtra. It was formed in 2006, by Meenakshi Menon, Namita Roy Ghose, and Peter Armand Menon. Vanashakti aims to conserve the forests, wetlands, wildlife corridors, habitats, through education and litigation to achieve its objectives of creating awareness about environmental topics, protecting and reviving rivers and preventing opencast mining in areas that are well-endowed with biodiversity. It also directs its efforts in involving local forest-dwelling communities to protect the biodiversity of the region and provides sustainable livelihood options for forest dependent and coastal communities. Vanashakti's thrust areas are forest, mangrove and wetland protection, environmental education for both urban and rural schools, livelihoods for forest based communities and scientific investigation into local environmental degradation.

== Projects ==
=== Mangrove and Wetland Conservation ===
One of the major initiatives of Vanashakti is conservation of Wetlands, specifically mangroves in Mumbai metropolitan areas. Vanashakti conducts research on Mangroves through "photo documentation, regular visits, and archive databases". Over the years, Vanashakti has fought many court cases against activities that have harmful impact on the health of the wetlands in Maharashtra. Following are the examples of Vanashakti’s legal efforts to save the Mangroves:-

- PIL filed to stop reclamation of coastal wetlands to construct SEZ (Special Economic Zone) in Important Bird Area, the Thane Creek. In response to the PIL, Bombay High Court ordered the project proponent to stop dumping of solid waste in Mulund-Thane SEZ.
- PIL filed against Kanjurmarg dumping ground for destruction of mangroves and violation of waste management rules by BMC.Following the PIL, Bombay High Court ordered BMC to stop dumping waste in Kanjurmarg Landfill.
- Complaints filed highlighting issues of degradation/destruction of mangroves and wetlands at all levels of government.
- PIL filed by Vanashakti on the non-implementation of Wetland Rules led to High Court ruling that banned all construction on Wetlands.
- Along with two other NGOs, Vanashakti filed a PIL against illegal reclamation and dumping on the CRZ-I. The PIL also asked for the creation of a governing body to keep the destruction of wetlands in check.
- The state environment department directed the Maharashtra Pollution Control Board to carry out an inspection at Sewri Bay in response to Dayanand's letter to the state government urging the protection of its wetlands and birds. The Mumbai High Court issued notices to port trust and Maharashtra Coastal Zone Management Authority. Meanwhile, officials from the city collectorate confirmed that indeed there was destruction of mangroves at Sewri Bay.
- Thane Creek Flamingo Sanctuary has more than one and a half lakh birds, many of which are migratory species and many of them critically endangered species. The state of Maharashtra had refused to take steps to protect it. In 2011, Vanashakti proposed to declare the area as Sanctuary and requested the State Government to protect the area. Finally, in 2016 the notification was issued where the Thane creek from Airoli bridge to Vashi bridge was declared the ‘Thane creek Flamingo Sanctuary’.

=== Restoration of Degraded Wetlands ===
Vanashakti was a part of a restoration programme launched by state of Maharashtra which involved plantation of mangroves over 60 hectares across the city of Mumbai. Vanashakti collected 300 kg of garbage from 200 acres of mangrove forests in Bhandup.

=== Forests and Wildlife Protection ===
- PIL against construction of a dam on the perennial Dabhil River to protect its ecology and water security of the Sawantwadi-Dodamarg wildlife corridor.
- Petition filed against felling of 3000 trees along the Shirsha Phata Ambadi Road in Thane for widening of roads.
- Campaigns by Vanashakti helped in declaration of Sawantwadi-Dodamarg belt as Ecologically Sensitive Area (ESA) by Bombay High Court.
- Stalin and Vanashakti NGO filed a Public Interest Litigation with the Bombay High Court petitioning to identify and demarcate "Critical Wildlife Habitats" in wildlife sanctuaries in the state of Maharashtra.
- The biodiversity rich forests of Tungareshwar have an endangered buffer zone, with human industry such as quarrying, construction of roads and religious structures, deforestation and hunting have continually violated the bulwark of the ecologically sensitive zone. the State Government had not declared the ESZ despite requests by Vanashakti since 2012. After a 6 year delay, Vanashakti moved the Honourable High Court of Bombay seeking the issuance of a directive to the State Government to finalize the ESZ. In 2019, The ministry of environment forests and climate change (MoEFCC) approved the final notification to create a protective, eco-sensitive zone (ESZ) around Tungareshwar Wildlife Sanctuary (TWLS) and Tansa Wildlife Sanctuary in Palghar and Thane districts of Maharashtra.

=== Save Aarey ===
Vanashakti had filed petition with the National Green Tribunal (NGT) demanding that Aarey Milk Colony be declared a No Development Zone. The NGT prohibited any construction work in the Aarey Milk Colony until it decided on the dispute over the Metro III car shed.

=== Sanjay Gandhi National Park ===
Stalin had written a letter to Sanjay Gandhi National Park alleging hills in Dindoshi which were in the vicinity of SGNP were being flattened based on satellite images of the area and requested the authorities to take necessary steps to prevent further deforestation.

In 2015, in a petition filed by Vanashakti, it sought to demarcate “Critical Wildlife Areas” in order protect the various species from extinction inside forests and sanctuaries.

In January 2016, the Ministry of Environment and Forests in an affidavit in the National Green Tribunal that they were in the final stages of setting up an eco-sensitive zone around Sanjay Gandhi National Park. NGO Vanashakti had filed a petition seeking the declaration of Aarey Milk Colony as an Eco-Sensitive Zone.

=== Anti-Opencast Mining ===
Vanashakti was the first NGO to take up the issue of mining near Sindhudurg region in Maharashtra in 2010 following which the Union Minister of environment and forest Jairam Ramesh wrote a letter to then Chief Minister of Maharashtra Ashok Chavan asking him to review all 49 mining leases in that region.

=== River Conservation and Restoration ===
- Save Ulhas River Project under which independent research on the water quality of Ulhas River was conducted by Vanashakti. Results included increase in salinity and BOD levels, following which the complaint was filed.
- Public Trust Doctrine for Rivers is a Regulation Policy for Rivers. Urban spaces established closer to river origins lead to detrimental effects on these rivers. Discharge of sewage into these rivers makes the water non-potable for up to 30 km downstream and also disturbs groundwater percolation and recharge. Vanashakti moved the High Court to enforce the Doctrine of Public Trust for rivers, by which the State as the custodian of natural resources must keep it from pollution and should allow unrestricted access to all citizens and animals.
- The Mithi River is a seasonal river which has seen decades of abuse and encroachments on its floodplains and estuaries. Vanashakti challenged the Coastal Regulation Zone clearance granted for construction of retaining walls and service road along the banks of Mithi River by Mumbai Metropolitan Region Development Authority. On August 16, 2017, the Supreme Court in its verdict ordered the immediate barring of any deepening, widening or blasting operations in the river. It further mandated the establishment of a panel to ensure pollution in the river reduces and its restoration begins soon.

=== Coastal Conservation ===
- In 2019, Vanashakti held a Morjim-Sea Turtle Festival in collaboration with the Goa Forest Department where workshops were conducted among tourists and citizens to create awareness on Olive Ridleys turtles, their nesting habits and, the efforts of the Forest Department to preserve their nesting sites and patterns, the hatchlings and their zoological behaviour in surviving in the vast ocean, citizen dos and don'ts and the various threats to their survival in Morjim. The impact of the festival from awareness building, outreach, beach clean ups and applying the community-conservation model in Morjim were noticed.
- The coastal road project was a reclamation project that proposed reclamation up to 95 hectares of the intertidal rocky shore from Princess Street to Worli. Vanashakti through its coastal division Sagarshakti conducted a biodiversity shorewalk at Worli and documented 36 species at the Worli 'to be reclaimed' intertidal shore. Vanashakti intervened on wildlife protection and biodiversity grounds and the High Court in April 2019 squashed the CRZ (Coastal Regulation Zone) clearance and stalled the project. The matter has now been listed in the Supreme Court for which the Honourable court has refused to lift the stay on the Coastal Road CRZ clearance. The CRZ clearance had several loopholes on biodiversity and livelihood grounds that had missing data on keystone species such as corals and gorgonians.

=== Tribal Community Based Conservation ===
Vanashakti works with tribal communities living in the Mangroves to prevent deforestation and illegal usage of forest resources. Alternative methods of livelihood like apiculture are encouraged to provide financial independence to these communities. Paper bags production from Woman Self Help groups in Wada Taluka, initiated by Vanashakti gives an opportunity to women to provide for their families and reduces the incoming waste in Sanjay Gandhi National Park.

=== Awareness Programmes ===
Vanashakti regularly holds activities like beach and mangrove cleanup, rallies, cleanliness drive, workshops, tree plantation, bird watching tours and educational programs and competition in schools to generate awareness about environment amongst students and general public alike. Vanashakti hosts tours of mangrove forests in Mumbai Metropolitan Region (MMR) to educate public on the importance of mangroves and are among the forerunners in raising awareness about conservation of coastal ecology. Vanashakti works to address all aspects of conservation like education, awareness, sustainable livelihoods, engage with government authorities and judicial battles as a last resort.

=== External links ===
- Official Site
- Youtube Channel
