= Savarde Budhruk =

Savarde Budhruk Savarde
- town
- Location in Maharashtra, India
- Coordinates: 16.27°N 74.12°E
- Country: India
- State: Maharashtra
- District: Kolhapur district

Population
  - Total: 6,000

Languages
  - Official: Marathi
- Time zone: UTC+5:30 (IST)
- PIN: 416219
- Telephone code: 02325
- Vehicle registration: MH-09
- Nearest city: Murgud
- Lok Sabha constituency: Kagal
- Vidhan Sabha constituency: Kolahpur

Savarde Budhruk situated in the south-west corner of Maharashtra, India. The population of Savarde Bk was approx 6000 as per the 2001 census. As is the case in most of the Maharashtra cities, the main language spoken here is Marathi.
