= Sangrul =

- city
- Location in Maharashtra, India
- Coordinates: 16.6831235°N 74.0918827°E
- Country: India
- State: Maharashtra
- District: Kolhapur

Languages
  - Official: Marathi
- Time zone: UTC+5:30 (IST)

Sangrul is a small town in Karvir taluka of Kolhapur district in the Indian state of Maharashtra. Its Coordinates are: 16.6831235 N 74.0918827E. and is located on Maharashtra State Highway 115 between Kolhapur and Gaganbawada town.

Before the delimitation of constituency in 2008, Adyar was constituency number 282 of Maharashtra Legislative Assembly between 1977-2004.
