= Gandhinagar, Kolhapur =

Gandhingar
- Census town
- Location in Maharashtra, India
- Coordinates: 16.7091°N 74.2821°E
- Country: India
- State: Maharashtra
- District: Kolhapur

Population (2010)
  - Total: 16,331

Languages
  - Official: English Marathi
- Time zone: UTC+5:30 (IST)
- Postal code: 416119

Gandhinagar is a census town in Kolhapur district in the state of Maharashtra, India.

== Demographics ==
As of 2001 India census, Gandhinagar had a population of 12,371. Males constitute 52% of the population and females 48%. Gandhinagar has an average literacy rate of 80%, higher than the national average of 59.5%: male literacy is 84%, and female literacy is 75%. In Gandhinagar, 12% of the population is under 6 years of age.

Sindhi is spoken by 73.34% of the population of Gandhinagar.
