= Kopeshwar Temple =

Hindu Shiva temple in Khidrapur, Shirale Taluka, Kolhapur District, India

Kopeshwar Temple at Khidrapur
- Shri Kopeshwar
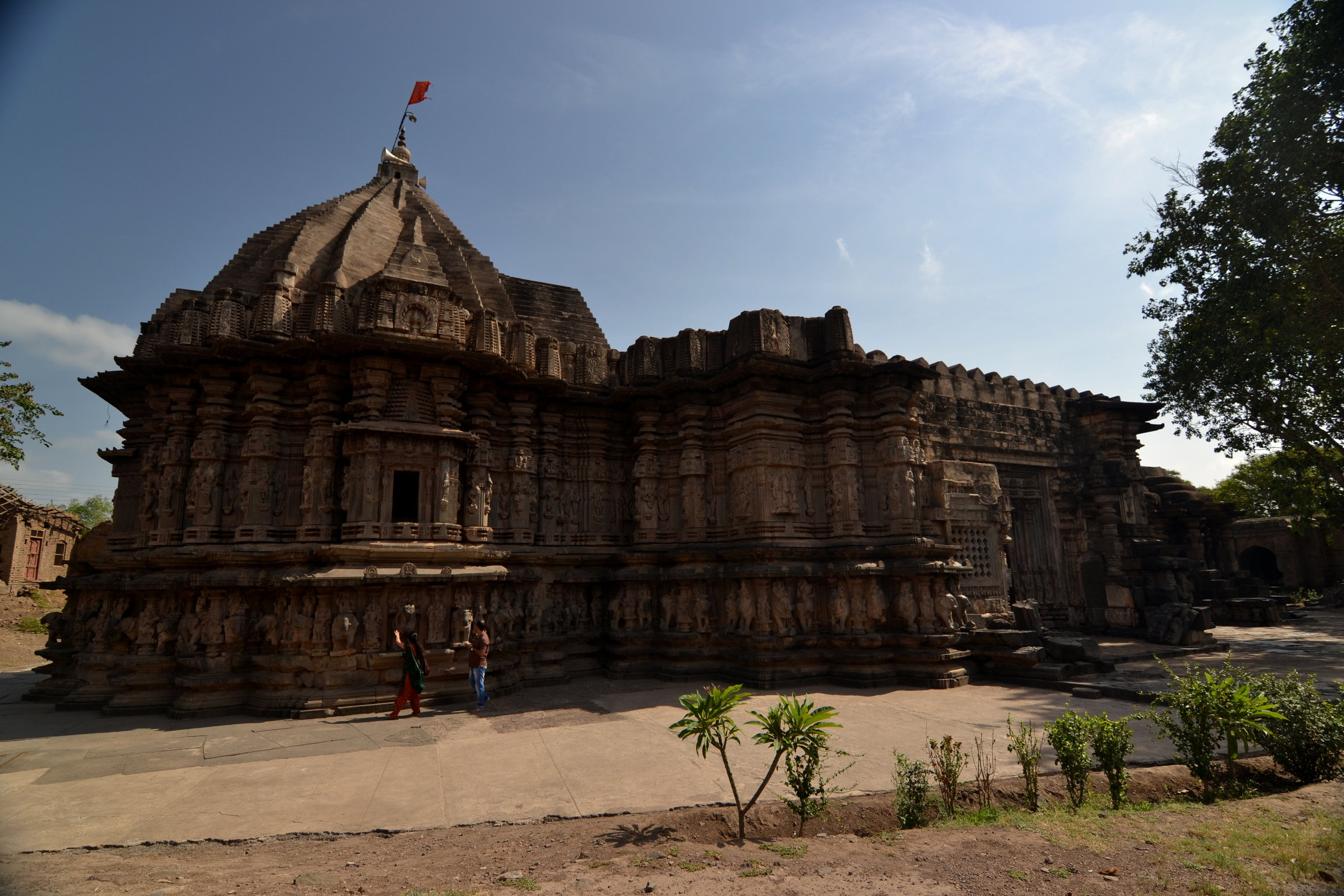
- Kopeshwar Temple at Khidrapur

- Location in Maharashtra

Religion
- Affiliation: Hinduism
- District: Kolhapur
- Deity: Shiva
- Festival: Mahashivratri

Location
- State: Maharashtra
- Country: India
- Interactive map of Kopeshwar Temple at Khidrapur
- Coordinates: 16.615898°N 74.685138°E

Architecture
- Creator: Shilahara King Gandaraditya
- Completed: 11th century

Specifications
- Temple: Good
- Monument: vandalised

Kopeshwar Temple is at Khidrapur, Kolhapur district, Maharashtra. It is a Hindu temple dedicated to Shiva. This temple is in Maharashtra It is also accessible from Sangli as well. It was built in the 12th century by Shilahara king Gandaraditya between 1109 and 1178 CE. It is to the east of Kolhapur, ancient & artistic on the bank of the Krishna river. Even though Silaharas were Jain kings, they built and renovated various Hindu temples, thus depicting their respect and love for all religions. Kopeshwar means angry Shiva .

== Structure ==
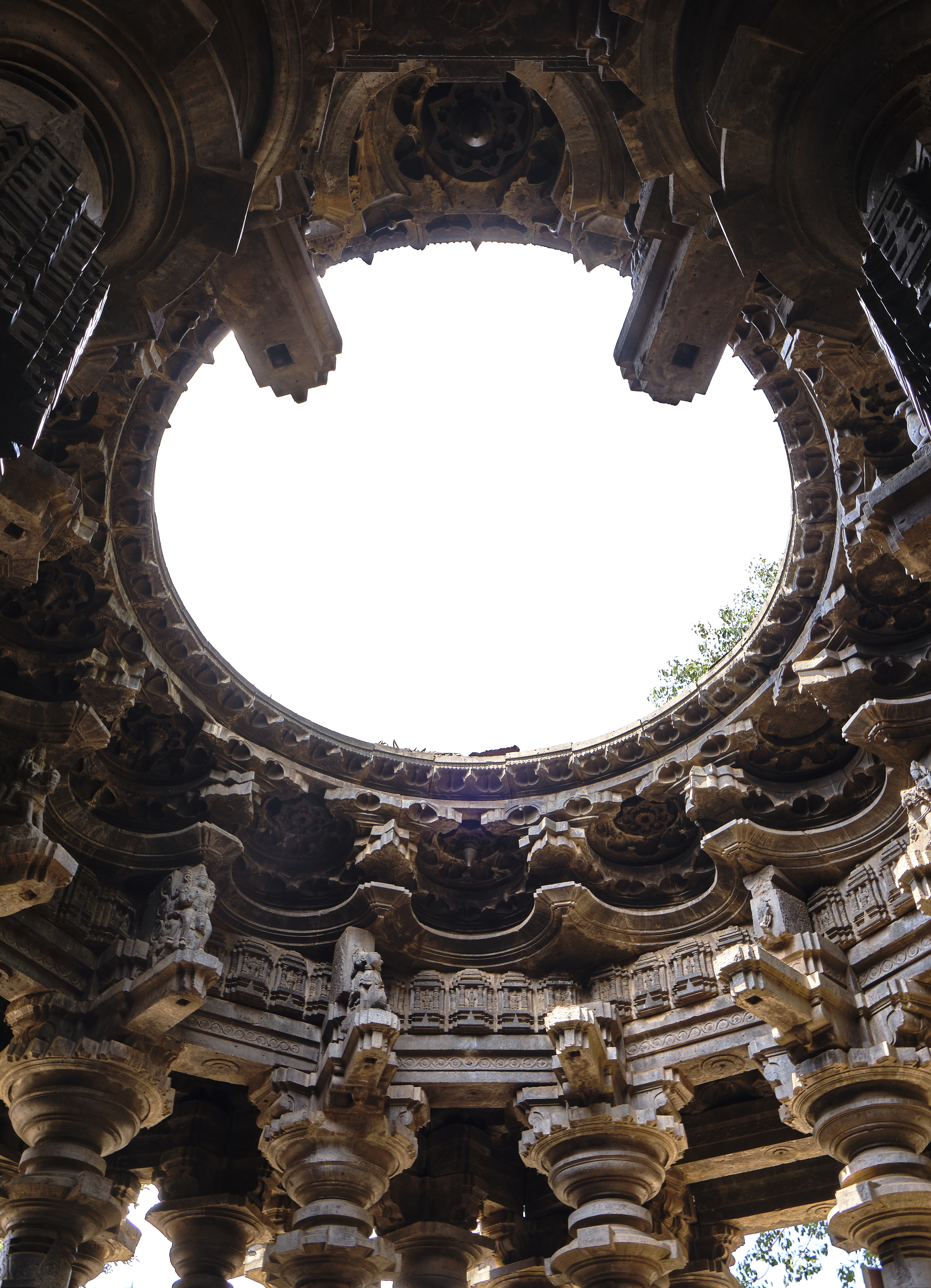
Inside view of the Swarga gruha

The entire temple is divided into four parts Swargamandapa, Sabhamandapa,Antaral kaksha and Garbha gruha. The Swargamandapa has a vestibule with an open top. The sanctum is conical. The exterior has stunning carvings of deities and secular figures. Elephant statues sustain the weight of the temple at the base. In the interior, we first see Vishnu (Dhopeshwar) & Shivaling facing north. But there is no Nandi who has a separate Mandir. Separate Actor-Pendal also called swarga mandap, hall, old pillars, carvings of gods & male and female artists in various poses are attractive. The ceiling is semi-circular with matchless engravings. On the outside, complete 'Shivaleelamrit' is carved. The Kopeshwara, an ancient & artistic temple situated on the bank of Krishna is a fine example of ancient sculpture. It was built in the 11-12 century by Shilahara. The ceiling is semi-circular with matchless engravings. Inside there is a statue of Vishnu( Dhopeshwar) and Shivling " Kopeshwar " facing north. There is no Nandi who has a separate Mandir. Separate Actor-Pendal, hall, old pillars, carvings of gods and male-female artists in various poses are attractive. This is the only Shiva temple in India with an idol of Vishnu.

== The Legend ==
It is believed that Daksha, who did not like his youngest daughter Sati marrying Shiva, conducted a Yagna to which he did not invite the couple. Sati visited her father's house on Shiva's Nandi to confront her father. Dakhsa insulted her in front of the guests present at the Yagna. Unable to bear any further insults, Sati jumped in the fire of Yagna and self-immolated. When Shiva learned of it, he was infuriated. He punished Daksha by severing his head. Vishnu pacified Shiva whereupon he restored Daksha's head but with a goat's head. The furious Shiva was brought to this place by Vishnu to calm him down. Hence the temple got its unusual name as Kopeshwar (wrathful god). This explains why Vishnu is in the temple in the form of a ling along with Shivling and Nandi is not seen in this temple as Sati rode on the Nandi while visiting her parents' home.

== History ==
The present temple was built by Shilahara kings who were native to Maharashtra. They were feudatories of Rashtrakuta. Apart from the legend, the name might have originated from the ancient name of the town, which was "Koppam". The town witnessed two major battles. The first one took place in 1058 CE between Chalukya king Ahavamalla and Chola king Rajendra. The Chola king Rajadhiraja was killed during the battle, and the coronation of the second king, Rajendra Chola took place right on the battlefield.

The second battle took place between Shilahara king Bhoj-II and Devagiri Yadav king Singhan-II, during which king Bhoj-II was captured by Yadavas and was kept captive on the fort of Panhala. This event is recorded in the 1213 CE inscription near the south entrance of the temple. This battle brought the rule of the Kolhapur branch of Shilaharas to end.

There are about a dozen inscriptions on the inside and outside of this temple, out of which only a couple of inscriptions are in good condition now. These inscriptions reveal the names of few kings and their officers. All these inscriptions except one are in Kannada language and script. The only Devanagari inscription in Sanskrit language is by Singhan-II and is located on the outer wall near South entrance of the temple.

== Swarga Mandap ==
Entering the Svarga Mandap, there is a circular opening seen at the top. It is supported by 48 hand-carved pillars. At the periphery of the Svarga Mandap there are carved idols of Lord Ganesh, Karthikeya swami, Lord Kubera, Lord Yamraj, Lord Indra, etc. along with their carrier animals like peacock, mouse, elephant, etc. Standing at the center of the Svarga Mandap, one can see idols of Lord Brahma on the left hand side wall of the entrance of Sabha Mandap. In the center, people can see the Shiva Kopeshwar shivling situated in the Garbh Gruha & towards the right hand side wall the carved idol of Vishnu is visible. A stone pedestal mounted east of the temple's southern door has a carved inscription in Sanskrit, written in Devnagari script . It mentions that the temple was renovated in 1136 by Raj Singhadev of yadav dynasty.

== Pop culture ==
This temple recently came into the limelight when the film shoot of Katyar Kaljat Ghusali was done for the song of "Shiv Bhola Bhandari" in the temple.

== Nearest cities ==
Sangli is 36 km and Kolhapur is 60 km

== Nearest Railway Station ==
Sangli railway station which is 36 km is the nearest major city railway station. Sangli station is the nearest major railway station, about 36 km (22 mi) away on the Mumbai–Bangalore main line. Sangli railway station is also connected to the city via bus services. From Sangli railway station, there are several trains to Delhi, Mumbai, Bengaluru, Pune, Goa, Mysuru, Hubli, Belgaum, Surat, Vadodara, Ahmedabad, Jodhpur, Udaipur, Bikaner, Ajmer, Agra, Gwalior, Jhansi, Puducherry, Tirunelveli(Kanyakumari), Guntakal, Tiruchirapali, Ratlam, Kota, Nagpur, Itarsi, Chitaurgarh, Abu Road, Gandhidham etc. Sangli station is convenient to reach from Khidrapur.

== Sources ==
- Kanhere, Gopal Krishna. The Temples of Maharashtra. Maharashtra Information Centre 1989 p. 105 asif
- Deglurkar, G. B. "Koppeshwar (Khidrapur) Mandir Ani Moorti". 2016. Snehal Prakashan, Pune.

== Gallery ==

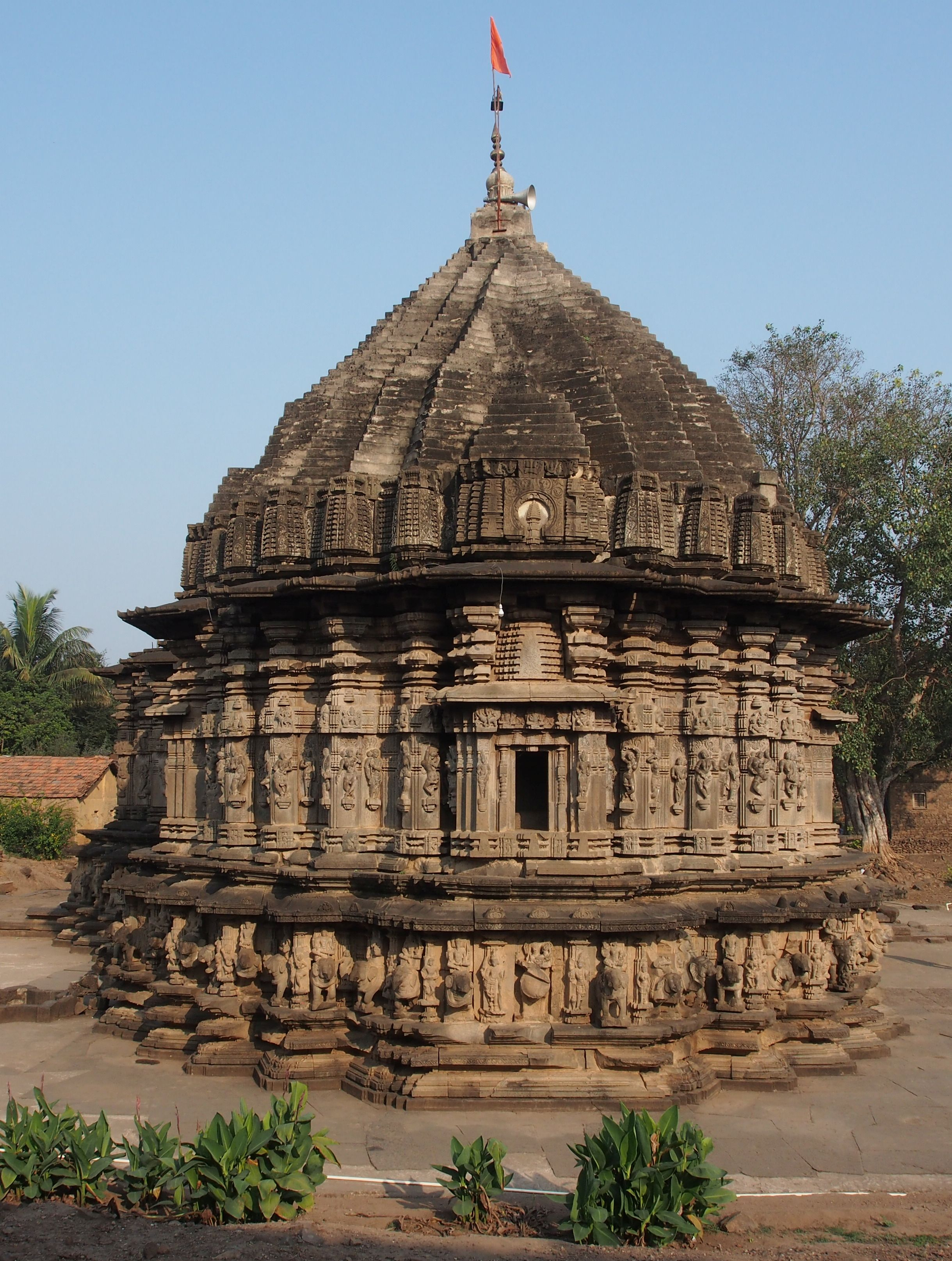

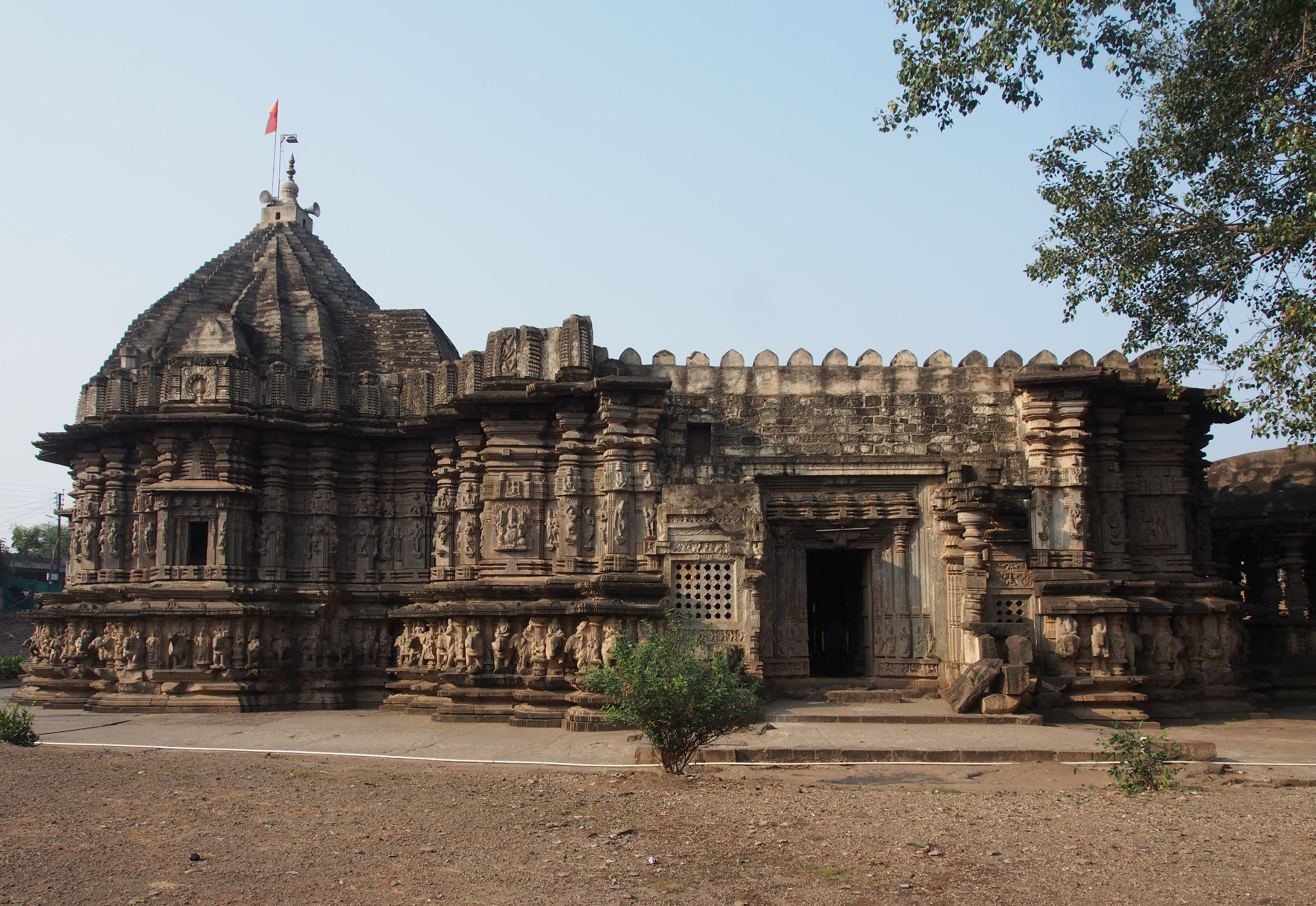

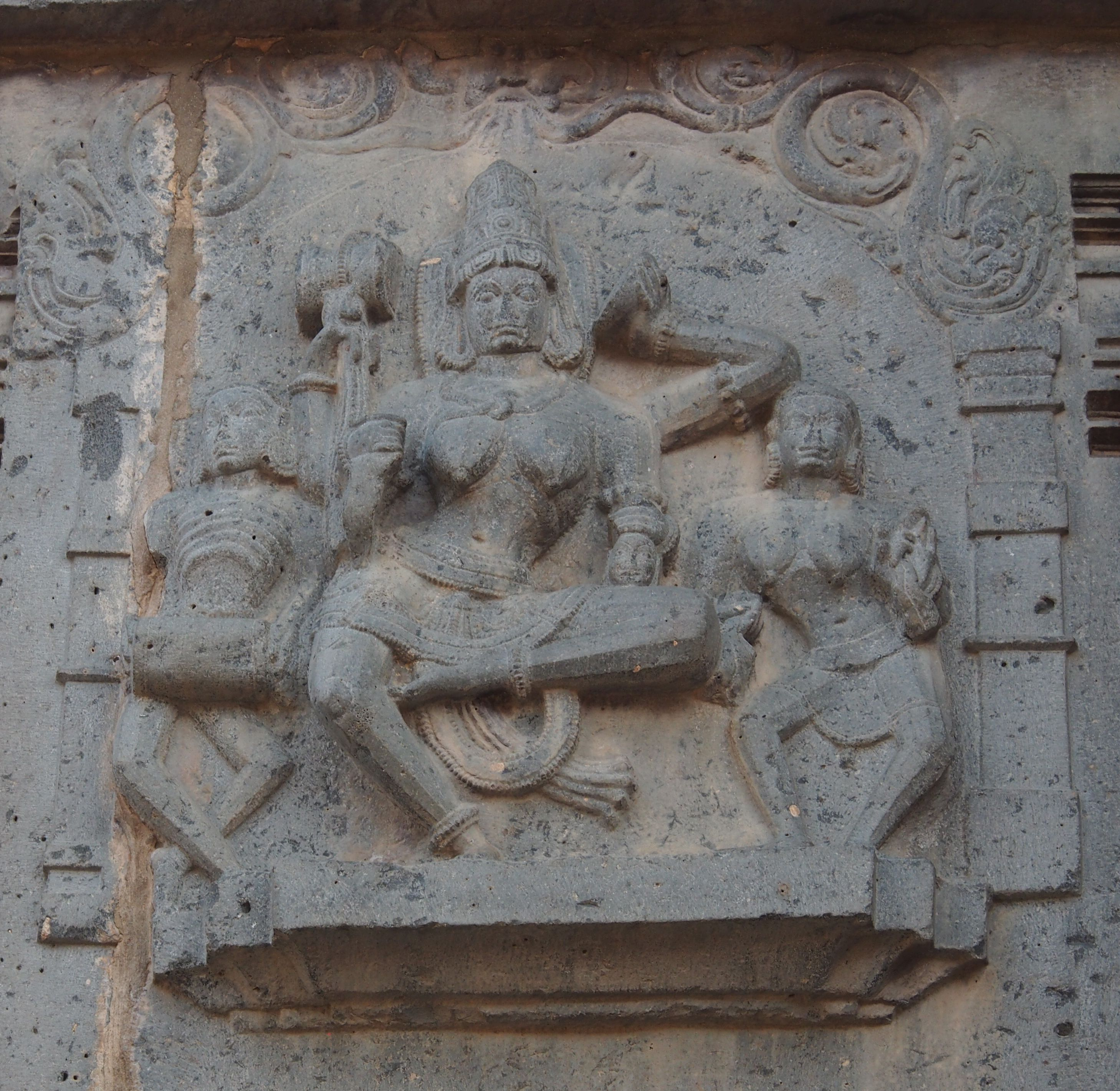

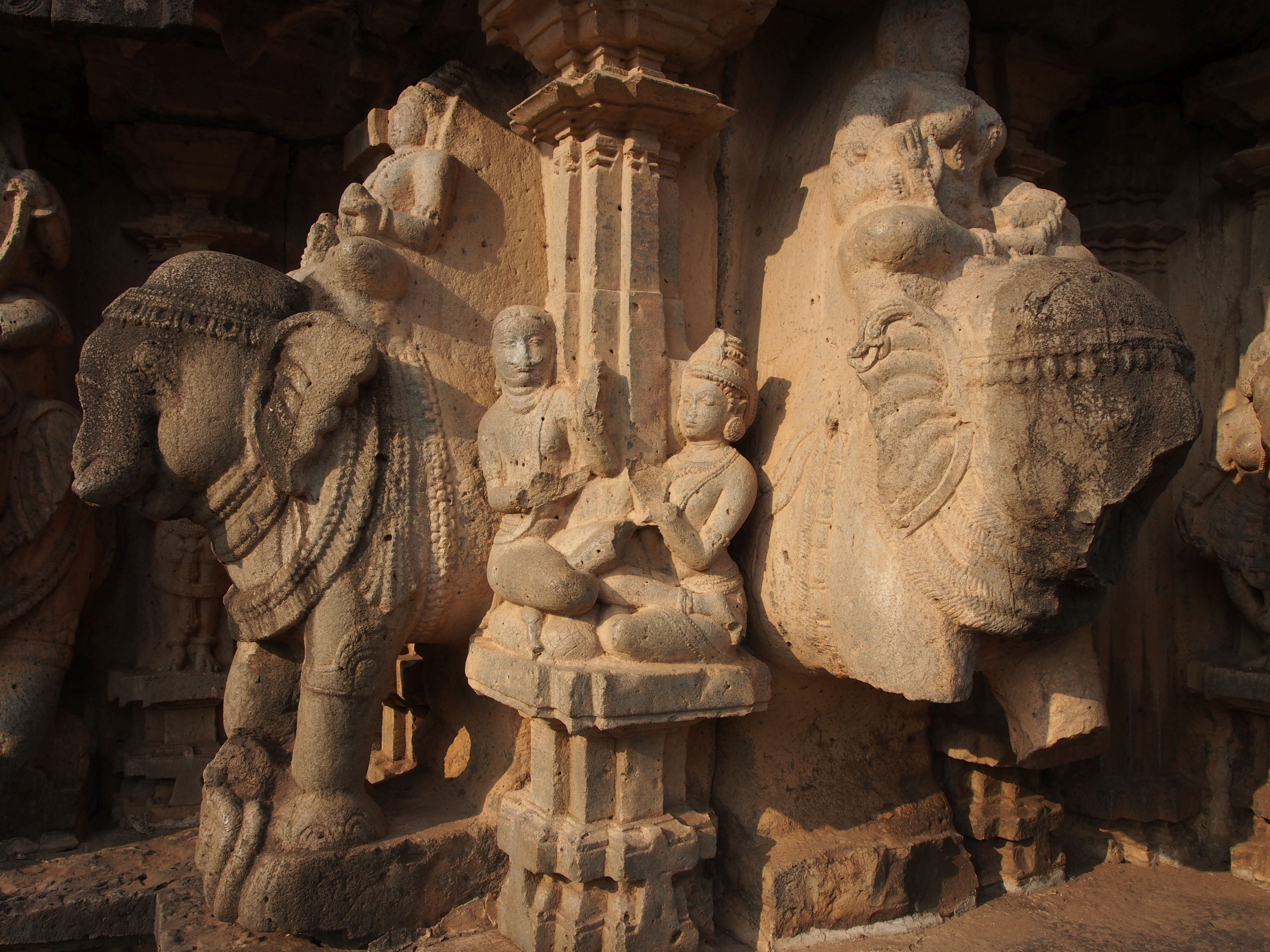

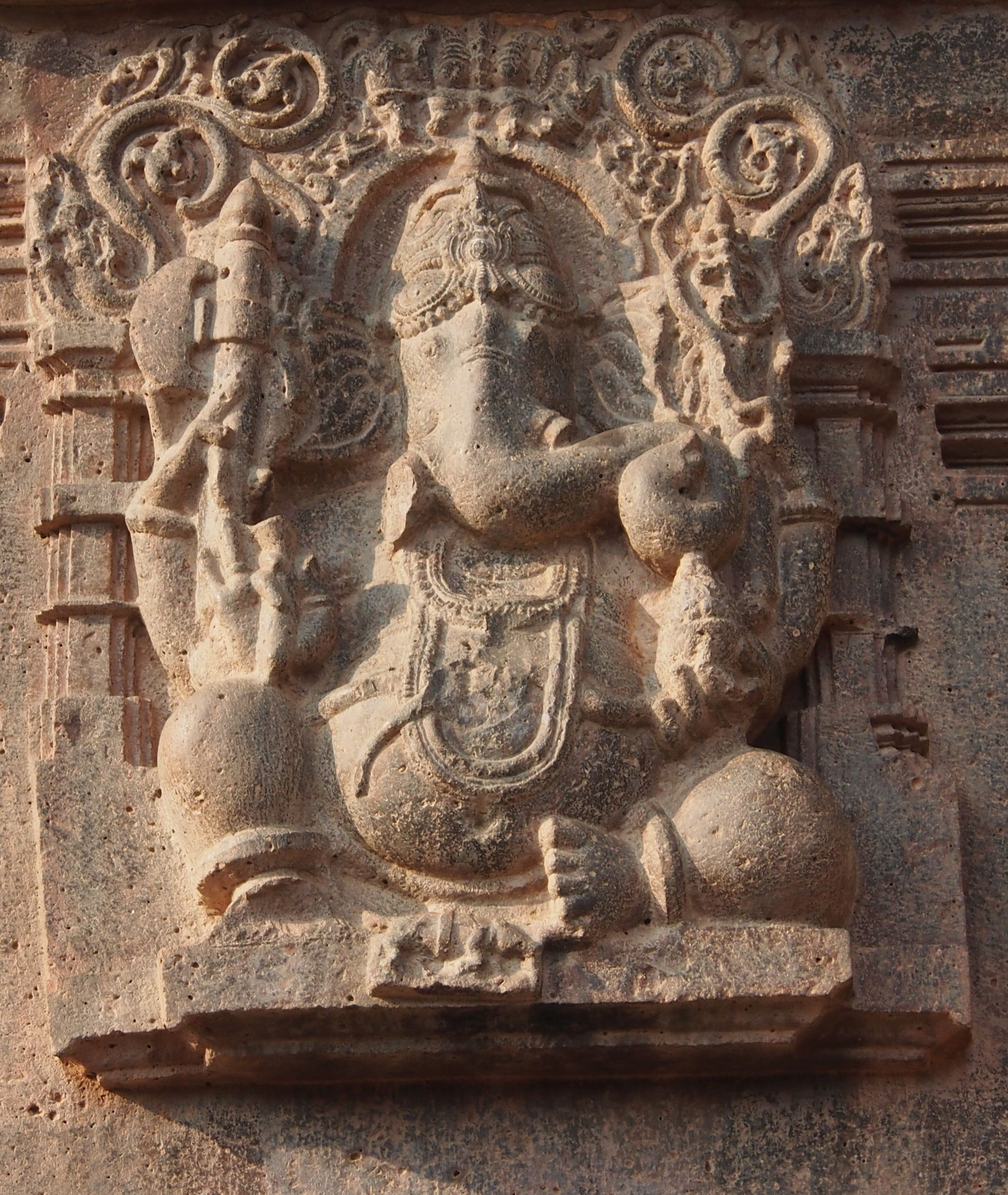

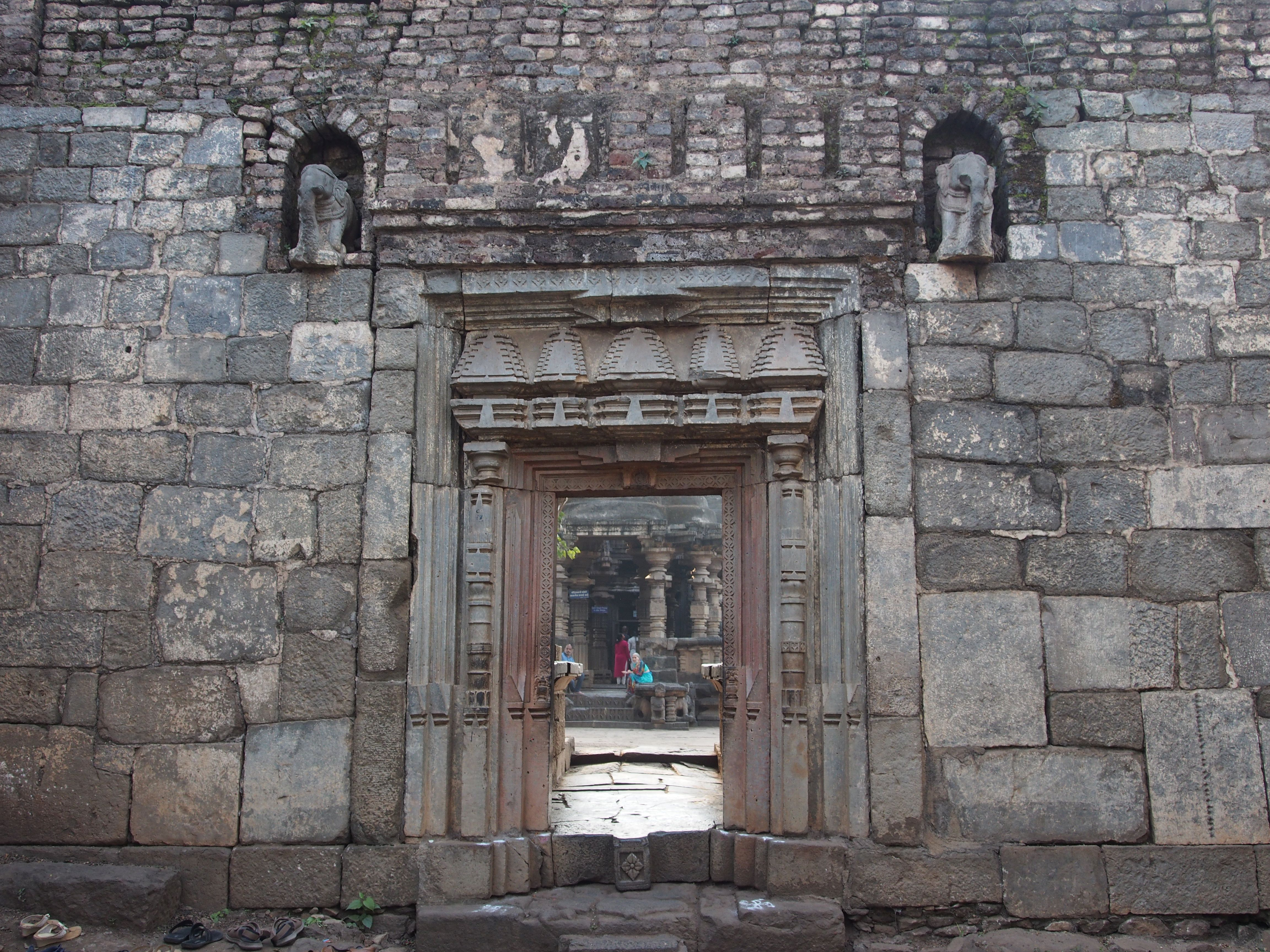
