= Shirol =

- town
- Location in Maharashtra, India
- Coordinates: 16°44′N 74°36′E
- Country: India
- State: Maharashtra

Languages
  - Official: Marathi
- Time zone: UTC+5:30 (IST)
- Postal code: 416103
- ISO 3166 code: IN-MH
- Vehicle registration: MH09

Shirol is a historic place. In a great war between Chhatrapati Shivaji Maharaj and the Mughal Empire, the Mughals were defeated and the heads of Mughal soldiers were hanged at the main gate of city. So the name Shirol: Shir (heads) + ol (row).

Shirol industrial area and tehsil in the Shirol subdivision of Kolhapur district in the Indian state of Maharashtra. The current MLA is Shri. Rajendra patil (Yadravkar)

Shirol industrial area is rapidly developing with sugar factories and auto ancillaries.

Also Shirol is very close to Narsingh wadi and sangli (Narsobachiwadi), famous for the Shree Datta Temple.

Shirol is a suburb of Sangli city and is 10 km away. Shirol is linked to Sangli and Miraj twin cities by MSRTC city bus service. Travel time from Shirol to Sangli city is just 15 minutes.

Marathi is the dominant native language of the town, which is spoken widely.

== Transport ==
From Mumbai and Pune, take NH4 national highway to Peth by the state highway 138 to Sangli. Then travel by state highway SH75 from Sangli to Shirol. Shirol is 17 km from Sangli city.

=== Railway ===
Miraj, 13 km away, has the nearest major railway junction station miraj and is connected to major cities by express and superfast trains. You can take MSRTC city buses, auto rickshaws and private cars from Miraj to Shirol. Travel time is 15–20 minutes.

=== Other railway stations ===
- Sangli - 17 km
- Jaysingpur - 7 km
- Kolhapur - 40 km

Express trains travelling on Pune-Miraj-Bangalore main line stop at Sangli railway station. One can take MSRTC city buses, auto-rickshaws and private cars from Sangli to Shirol. Travel time is 15–20 minutes.
