= Mhakave =

Village in Maharashtra

- village
- Location in Maharashtra, India Mhakave (India)
- Coordinates: 16.473755°N 74.2835°E
- Country: India
- State: Maharashtra
- District: Kolhapur

Languages
  - Official: Marathi
- Time zone: UTC+5:30 (IST)

Mhakave is an Indian village situated at the bank of the Vedaganga river in Kolhapur District, Maharashtra state. It is near to the Karnataka border. It has pincode 416216.

Shree Siddheshwar temple is situated in the village. People from the village celebrates Halsiddhnath Utsav every year. Mhakave English School & Junior College is situated at the western side of the village. Vidya Mandir Mhakave is also famous for primary school. Gram Panchayat office official website is https://sites.google.com/view/smartgpmhakave/office
