= Karvir, Kolhapur =

Karveer
- town
- Interactive map of Karveer
- Country: India
- State: Maharashtra
- District: Kolhapur

Languages
  - Official: Marathi
- Time zone: UTC+5:30 (IST)
- ISO 3166 code: IN-MH

Karvir is a tehsil in Kolhapur district in the Indian state of Maharashtra.

== See also ==
- Sangrul
