= Pargad =

Fort in Maharashtra state, India

Coordinates: 15.81649°N 74.04562°E

Pargad fort
- Part of former Maratha Empire, now Maharashtra
- Kolhapur District, Maharashtra (near Kolhapur)

Site information
- Type: Hill fort
- Owner: Government of India
- Open to the public: Yes

Location
- Shown within Maharashtra
- Location within Maharashtra

Site history
- Materials: Stone, lead

Garrison information
- Past commanders: Chhatrapati Shivaji Maharaj
- Occupants: Chattrapati Shahu

Paargad Fort is situated to the south of Kolhapur in Maharashtra state in India, at a distance of around 28 km from Chandgad. One of the major attractions of this fort is its serene environment and lush green surroundings. It is also known for housing a bronze statue of Chatrapati Shivaji and a temple of Bhagawati Bhawani.

The gad can be trekked from the village of Morle and across Palye located in Dodamarg taluka. Bus service runs from Dodamarg to Morle (18 km) and Dodamarg to Palye (16 km). A bus service also runs from Chandagad directly to Pargad.

On the way to Pargad from Goa one can visit the towns of Dodamarg, Palye and Medhe for the beautifully crafted tanks, and the Tilari Dam.

Fort was maintained by Raiba (Son of Tanaji Malusare).
