= Tillari (Forebay) Dam =

Tillari Dam
- Location within Maharashtra
- Official name: Tillari (Forebay) Dam D04936
- Location: Chandgad
- Coordinates: 15.759875°N 74.121323°E
- Opening date: 1985
- Owners: Government of Maharashtra, India

Dam and spillways
- Type of dam: Gravity
- Impounds: Kharani Nalla
- Height: 22.74 m (74.6 ft)
- Length: 350 m (1,150 ft)

Reservoir
- Total capacity: 1,514 km^{3} (363 cu mi)

Tilari (Forebay) Dam is situated in Dodamarg Taluka, in the Indian state of Maharashtra and the largest one is situated in Chandgad taluk of Kolhapur District in Maharashtra and is constructed on Tilari River as the result of a joint project by the Maharashtra and Goa governments. The water from this dam is distributed to both states. The dam is located near the border of Maharashtra and Karnataka and necessitated the relocation of several villages in the area. There are many reservoirs. The largest one is located near Belgaum in a village named Hajgoli in Maharashtra. The village is approximately 30 km from Belgaum and is a weekend spot for the people of that town.

"There has been no official ribbon-cutting function, no fanfare and no announcements, but the Rs 15 billion Tilari dam, a joint venture between Goa and Maharashtra, is now complete. The construction of the dam began in 1986."

"The Tillari dam was completed in all respects in May 2009," said S. Paramasivan, the managing director of the Tillari irrigation development corporation. "The topmost layer of the gorge-filling was completed in 2008 but the stone pitching and the erection of the four spillway gates was completed in May 2009," Paramasivan said."

The full storage of the Tillari dam will however only be done after two seasons considering the stability of the dam. "Since this is an earthen dam, the storage has to be raised in stages. But as far as Goa is concerned, the dam is complete," Paramasivan said.

The dam may have been completed now, but the waters of the Tillari dam began flowing into Goa long time back. The right bank main canal running up to Pernem was inaugurated on 19 December 2001, and the left bank main canal running into Bicholim was inaugurated on 16 February 2007.

Presently, the dam water meets the drinking water and industrial demands of three talukas in North Goa: Bicholim, Pernem and Bardez. Tillari supplies 7.5 million litres per day to the Chandel water treatment plant in Pernem and 90 million litres per day to the Assonora water treatment plant in Bardez. "But this is only because the treatment plants do not have the capacity to treat more water. PWD is increasing the capacity and we can supply whatever quantum of water they need," Paramasivan said.

Presently the right bank main canal supplies 7.5 million imperial gallons (34,000 m^{3}) per day to Pernem and the left bank main canal supplies 18.5 million imperial gallons (84,000 m^{3}) per day to Bicholim. But the original project provision is for the supply of 52 million imperial gallons (240,000 m^{3}) per day from the year 2011 onwards.

The total irrigation potential of the Tillari irrigation project in Goa is 1862 hectares, comprising 1139 hectares on the right bank main canal and 723 hectare on the left. But as of March 2009, only 301 hectares have been brought under cultivation on the right bank main canal and 165 hectares on the left bank main canal. While a total of 466 hectares have been brought under cultivation, the balance 1396 hectares will be brought under cultivation during 2009–10, Paramasivan said.

The original estimated cost of the project in 1986 was Rs 2.12 billion. Now, it has risen to about Rs 15 billion. Of this, Goa's liability is about Rs 11 billion.
