= Bhudargad =

Bhudargad Gargoti
- Tehsil
- Location in Maharashtra, India
- Coordinates: 16.235033°N 74.048109°E
- Country: India
- State: Maharashtra
- District: Kolhapur

Government
  - Type: nagar panchayat
  - Body: Panchayat Samiti

Population (2011 census)
  - Total: 15,000(Gargoti city) 150,368(bhudargad tehsil)

Languages
  - Official: Marathi
- Time zone: UTC+5:30 (IST)
- ISO 3166 code: IN-MH
- Nearest city: GARGOTI

Bhudargad is a tehsil in Kolhapur district in the Indian state of Maharashtra. Bhudargad is a fort built by Shivaji. Gargoti, the administrative place of Bhudargad tehsil is also known as an educational and economic hub of tehsil that has various institutions such as Mouni Vidyapeeth, D.Ed and B.Ed. College and ICRE - Institute of Civil and Rural Engineering.
