= Dodamarg taluka =

Dodamarg
- town
- Location in Maharashtra, India
- Coordinates: 15.7610°N 74.0909°E
- Country: India
- State: Maharashtra
- District: Sindhudurg
- Established: 26 June 1999

Languages
  - Official: Marathi
- Time zone: UTC+5:30 (IST)
- Nearest city: Bicholim

Dodamarg taluka is a taluka in Sindhudurg district in the Indian state of Maharashtra.

Dodamarg Taluka is situated between latitudes 15° 37' N and 15° 60' north and longitudes 73° 19' E and 73° 40' east. It is bordered by the Goa state to the south and west, Karnataka to the southeast and Sahyadri range to the east with a total area of 45053 hectares. Dodamarg is the smallest taluka in Sindhudurg district. According to the census of 2001, the taluka has 53 villages. Both Marathi and Malwani are widely spoken. Marathi is, however, the official language of the Dodamarg. Sex ratio in Dodamarg is 1054 i.e. for each 1000 males, which is below national average of 940 as per census 2011. Literacy rate in Dodamarg is 76.3%. Population of Dodamarg taluka is 50,032 persons as per latest provisional figures released by directorate of census operation in Sindhudurg, which shows a decrease of 2.30 percent in 2011 compared to figures of 2001 census. Dodamarg is a hilly region broken by valleys and surrounded by mountains.

The main rivers flowing across the taluka is Tilari. Tilari dam is constructed on this river. Kalne river is one of the tributary of this river.

There is a village named Mangeli at the eastern end Dodamarg taluka as well as on the border of Karnataka state. There are viewing points at Unneyi Bandharam, inter-state project of Tilari Dam, Rock Garden, the fort of Pargad and Hunumant Gad, Tervan Medhe, Kasainath Hill, Devotional places of faith like Nagnath Temple and elsewhere. The interstate dam project taken up under the auspices of Irrigation Dept. of Goa and Maharashtra State Govt. The Dam is constructed on Tilari river in Dodamarg Taluka. There is a large lake or reservoir formed by the Tilari Dam. Now-a-days, a number of wild elephants take shelter in the surroundings of Tilari. The dam and the lake at the distance of 45 km from Goa State, attract tourists as well as observers. The Wirdi fall in Dodamarg Taluka is so far an untouched site, at the distance of 20 km from Dodamarg Taluka place.

For the last 10 to 15 years, people from Kerala have done deep study of land, water, and environment of this area and started plantation of Pineapples along with Banana. Now pineapple is one of the main products of taluka. Recent years elephants are also marking entry into Dodamarg taluka from Karnataka state through Khanapur jungle. This is the first time, elephants have found habitation in Maharashtra State. The Tilari major irrigation project area (Dodamarg Taluka) is their main habitat. Inhabitants of Dodamarg also plant fruits such as pineapples and bananas, which are then sold in local markets, or even close by localities such as North Goa and Mumbai.

== Places of interest ==
The Pargad Fort was built by Chatrapati Shivaji Maharaj in 1674 to 1676 AD, on adjoining borders of Kolhapur and Sindhudurg Districts. Structurally it looks like a conch-shell. The fort was suitable to keep watch on the movement of the enemy in Goa as well as Konkan.

- Vijghar 66 MW power house
- Tilari Dam
- Pargadh - Fort
- Hanumanthgadh, Fukeri.
- Rajringan Waterfall, Fukeri.
- Megnis Sunset Point, Fukeri.
- Mangeli Water Fall
- Kasainath Mountain
- Nagnath Temple Medhe
- Virdi Water Fall
- Virdi Dam
- Talkat Garden
- Sasoli caves
- Mahalaxmi Power project konalkatta
- Parme river (bridge)
- Mangeli Ghat
- Bhekurli Sada
- Mangeli Sada
- Tilari Bionatural Farm
