= Kolhapur district =

Coordinates: 16.697904°N 74.225369°E

- District of Maharashtra
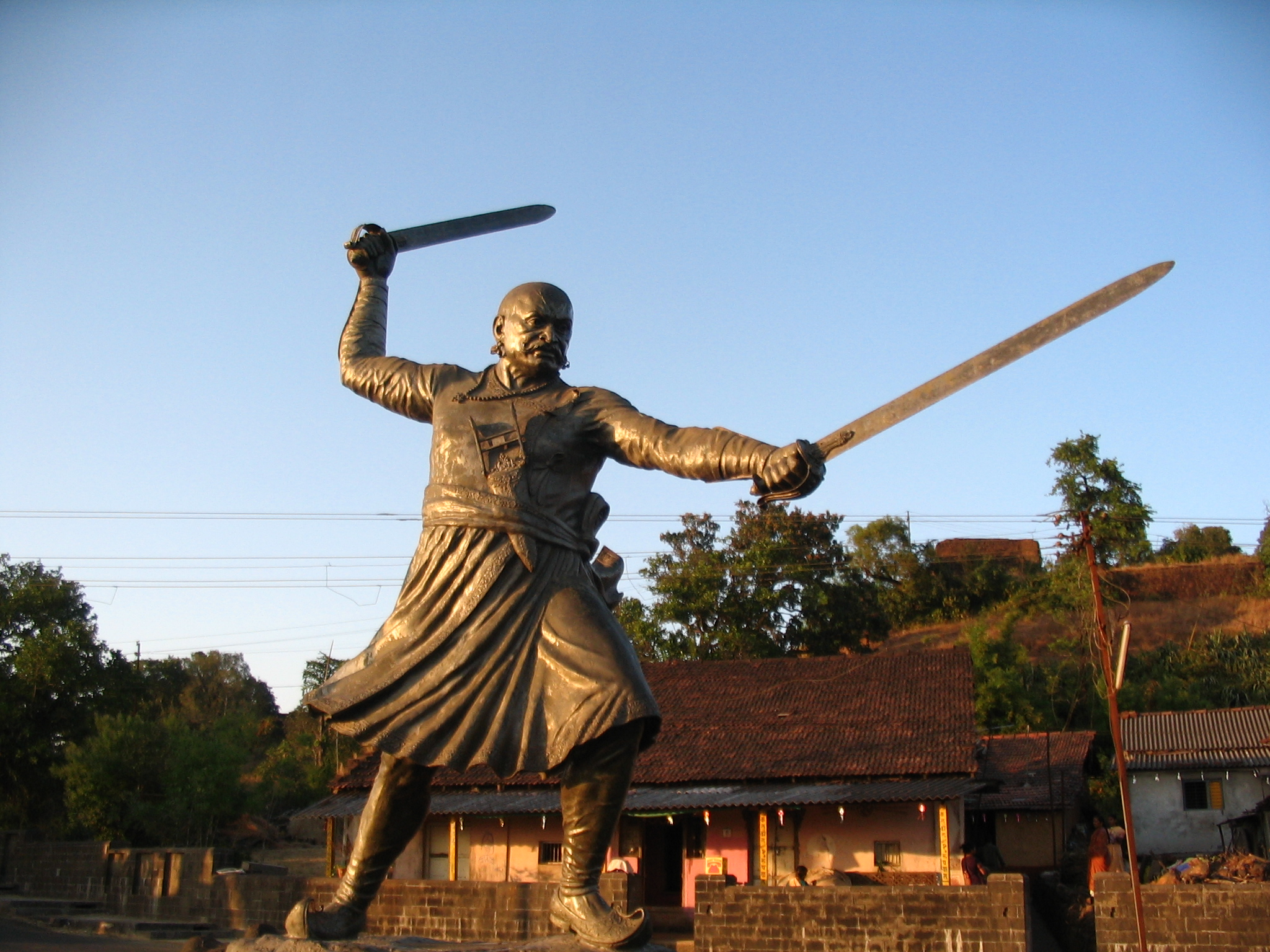
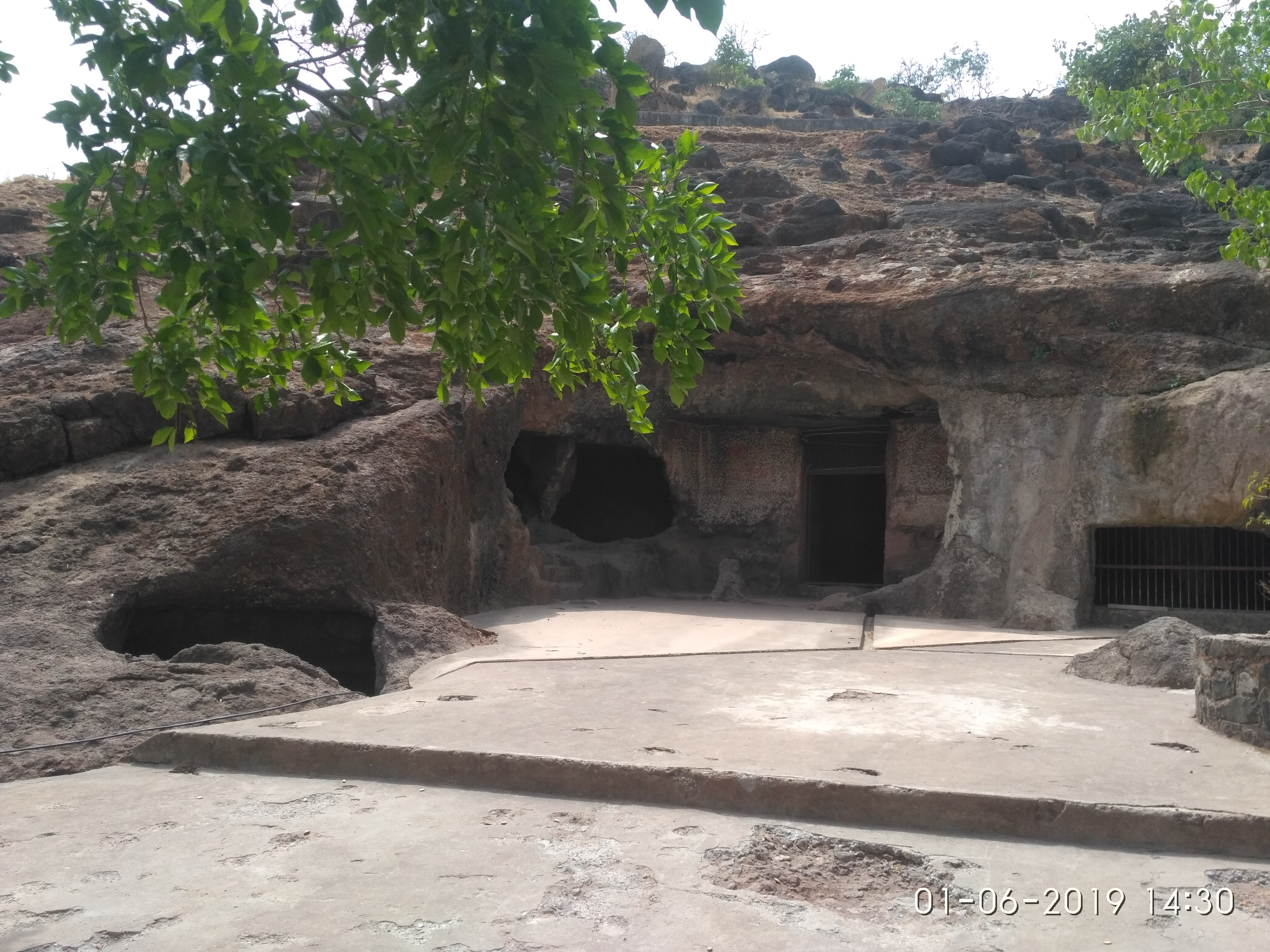
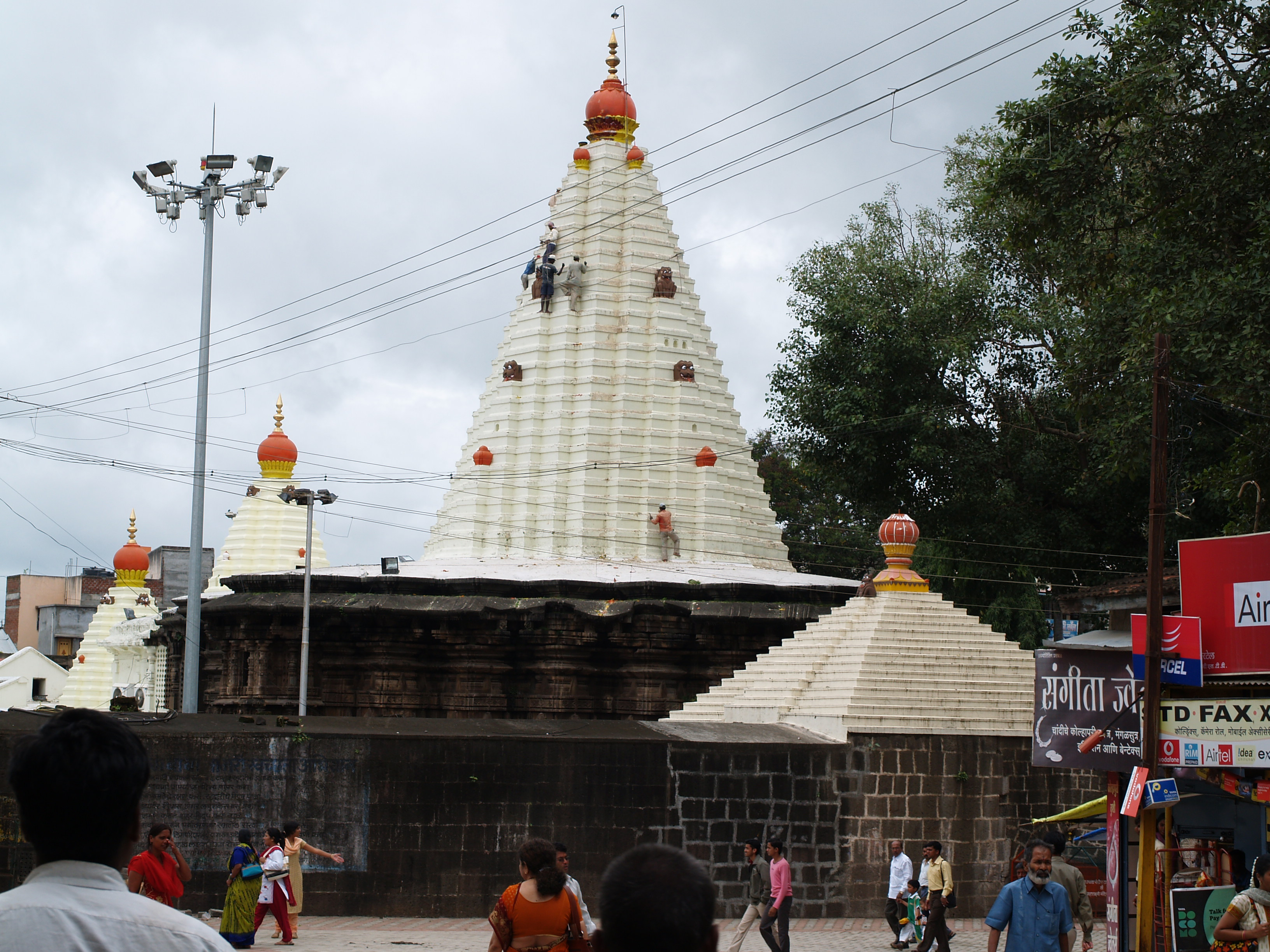
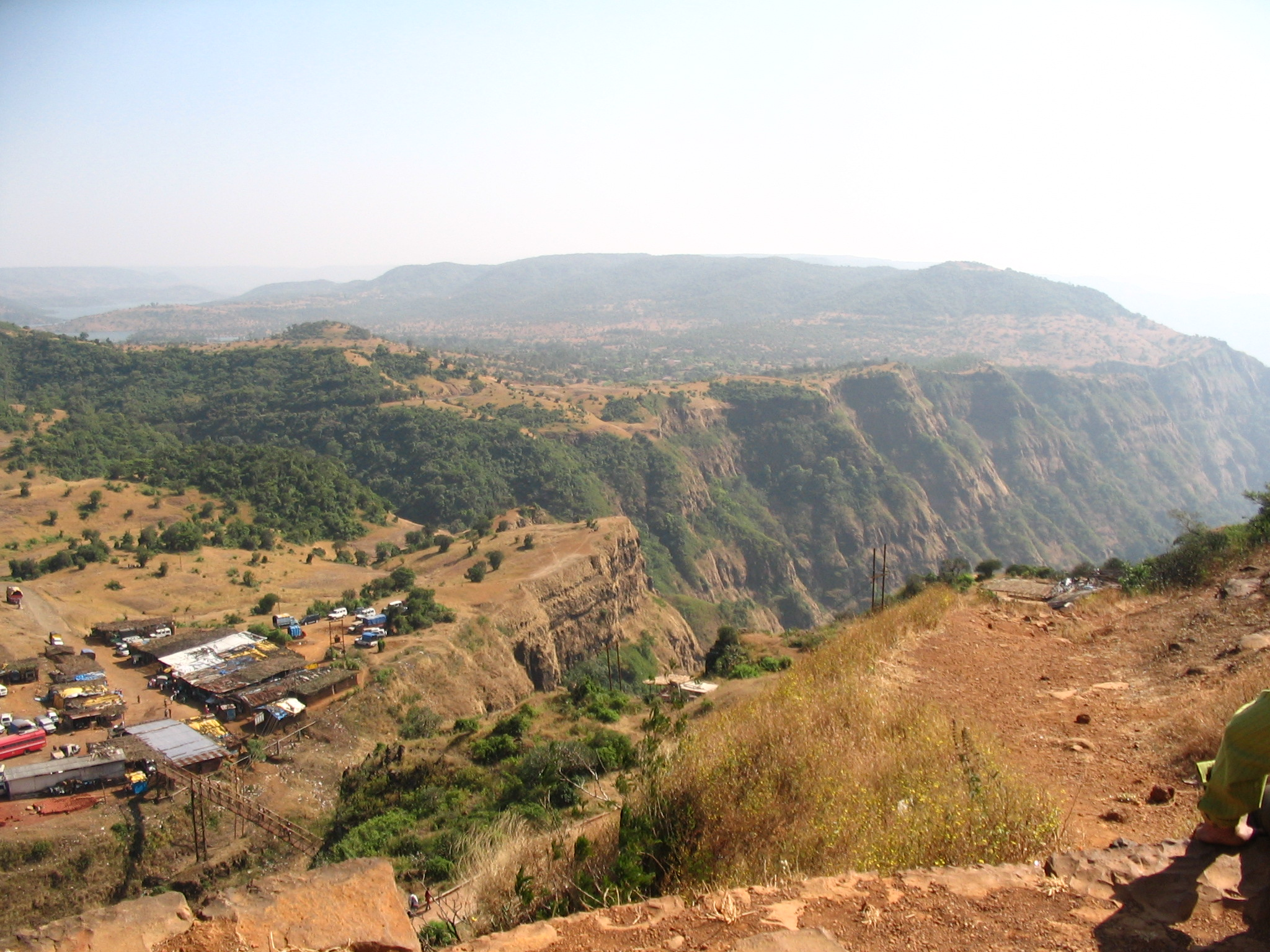
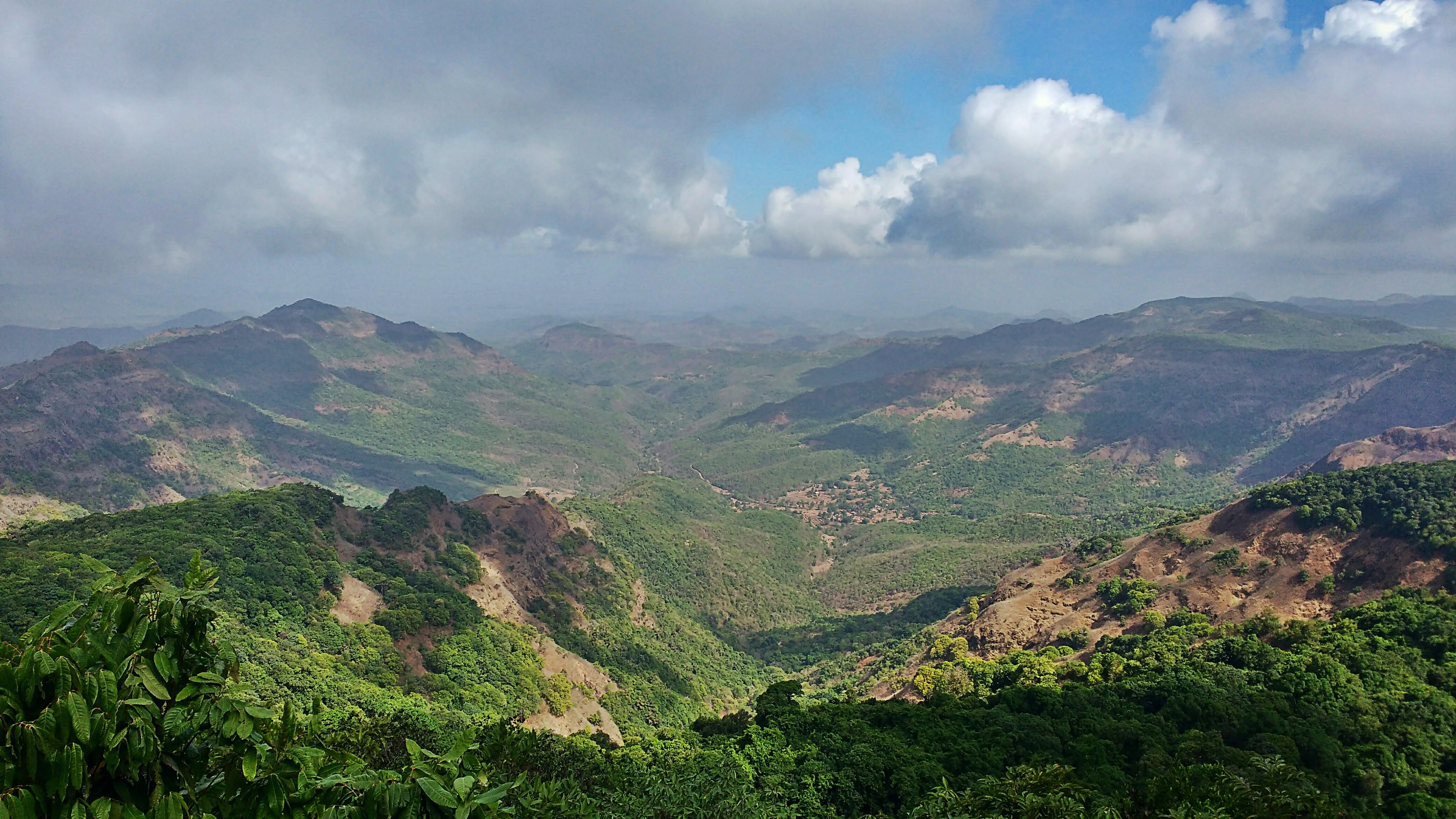
- Clockwise from top-left: Statue of Baji Prabhu Deshpande in Panhala Fort, Pohale Caves, view from Vishalgad Fort, Radhanagari Wildlife Sanctuary, Kopeshwar Temple at Khidrapur,Mahalakshmi Temple in Kolhapur

- Location in Maharashtra
- Country: India
- State: Maharashtra
- Division: Pune
- Headquarters: Kolhapur
- Tehsils: 1. Gadhinglaj, 2. Karveer, 3. Bhudargad, 4. Panhala, 5. Kagal, 6. Shirol, 7. Hatkanangale, 8. Ajara, 9. Chandgad, 10. Gaganbawada, 11. Radhanagari, 12. Shahuwadi.

Government
  - Body: Kolhapur Zilla Parishad
  - Guardian Minister: Madhuri Misal (Cabinet Minister MH)
  - President Zilla Parishad: President Mr. Rahul Patil; Vice President Mr. Jaywantrao Shimpi
  - District Collector: Mr. Rahul Rekhawar (IAS)
  - CEO Zilla Parishad: Shri Sanjay Singh Chavan (IAS)
  - MPs: Chhatrapati Shahu Maharaj (INC) (Kolhapur); Dhairyasheel Sambhajirao Mane (SS) (Hatkanangle)

Area
  - Total: 7,692 km^{2} (2,970 sq mi)

Population (2011)
  - Total: 3,874,015
  - Density: 503.6/km^{2} (1,304/sq mi)
  - Urban: 32%

Demographics
  - Literacy: 82%
- Time zone: UTC+05:30 (IST)
- Major highways: NH-4, NH-204
- Average annual precipitation: 1035 mm
- Website: kolhapur.gov.in/en/

Kolhapur district (Marathi pronunciation: [kolʱaːpuɾ]) is a district in the Maharashtra state of India. The city of Kolhapur is its district headquarter. It is situated near Panchaganga river.

It is bordered by the Sangli district to the north, by Ratnagiri district, Sindhudurg to the west and by Karnataka state to the east.

Kolhapur was a princely state during British rule in India. Shahu Maharaj ruled the state from 1894 to 1922 and worked toward its social and educational development. Kolhapur was a major hub of the Marathi film industry and was known as Chitranagari. It is now known as Bhalji Pendharkar Chitranagari.

== Geography ==
Kolhapur district has Bauxite mineral resources in Sahyadri mountains. Ghatprabha, Tamraparni, Dudhganga, Krushna, Bhogawati, Warna, Kasari, Panchaganga, Wedganga, Kumbhi rivers flow through this district. Groundnut, soyabean, tobacco, rice, jowar, cotton and sugarcane are prime crops of this district. Cashew is prime crop of Chandgad taluka. Kolhapur is part of Pune division. Radhanagari dam is present on the Bhogawati river. Kolhapur has Panhala hill station. Male to female ratio of the district is 1000:953

== Climate ==
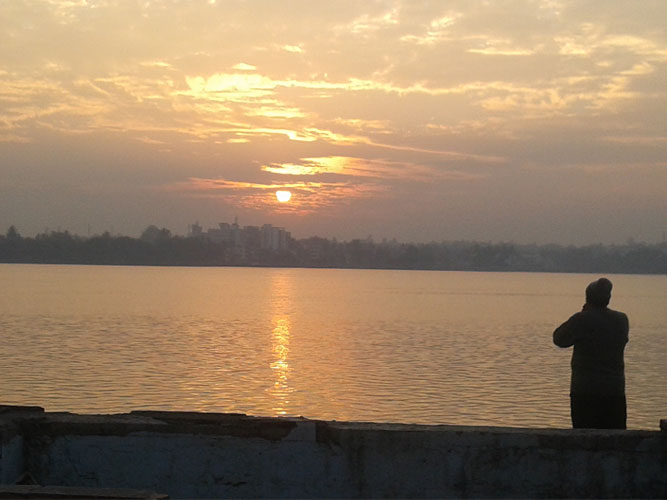
Rankala Lake at Sunrise

Kolhapur's climate is a blend of coastal and inland elements common to Maharashtra. The temperature has a range between 10 and 35 °C (50 and 95 °F). Summer in Kolhapur is comparatively cooler, but much more humid, than neighbouring inland cities. Maximum temperatures rarely exceed 35 °C (95 °F) and typically range between 33 and 35 °C (91 and 95 °F). Lows during this season are around 24 to 26 °C (75 to 79 °F).

The city receives abundant rainfall from June to September due to its proximity to the Western Ghats. The heavy rains often lead to severe flooding during these months. 2005, 2006, 2019 and 2021 were years when floods occurred. Temperatures are low in the rainy season and range between 19 and 30 °C (66 and 86 °F).

Kolhapur experiences winter from November to February. The winter temperatures are warmer than other cities in Maharashtra such as Pune and Nashik. Lows range from 9 to 16 °C (48 to 61 °F) while highs are in the range of 24 to 32 °C (75 to 90 °F) due to its high elevation and being adjacent to the Western Ghats. Humidity is low in this season making the weather much more pleasant.

== Demographics ==
According to the 2011 census, the population of the district is 3,876,001 out of which 1,230,009 are urban and 2,645,992 are rural.

Historical population
Year	Pop.	±% p.a.
1901	872,720	—
1911	792,681	−0.96%
1921	794,673	+0.03%
1931	908,317	+1.35%
1941	1,039,279	+1.36%
1951	1,267,609	+2.01%
1961	1,552,636	+2.05%
1971	2,001,973	+2.57%
1981	2,457,095	+2.07%
1991	2,989,507	+1.98%
2001	3,523,162	+1.66%
2011	3,876,001	+0.96%

Religions in Kolhapur district (2011)
Religion	Percent
Hinduism	87.20%
Islam	7.39%
Jainism	4.00%
Buddhism	0.77%
Christianity	0.40%
Other or not stated	0.24%

According to the 2011 census, Kolhapur district has a population of 3,876,001. This gives it a ranking of 65th in India (out of a total of 640). The district has a population density of 504 inhabitants per square kilometre (1,310/sq mi). Its population growth over the decade 2001-2011 was 9.96%. Kolhapur has a sex ratio of 953 females for every 1000 males. 31.73% of the population live in urban areas. Scheduled Castes and Scheduled Tribes make up 13.01% and 0.78% of the population respectively.

Kolhapur has one of the highest Human Development Index in India which stood at 0.770 in 2011.

Languages of Kolhapur district (2011)
1. Marathi (89.2%)
2. Hindi (3.84%)
3. Urdu (2.70%)
4. Kannada (2.00%)
5. Others (2.30%)

At the time of the 2011 Census of India, 89.16% of the population in the district spoke Marathi, 3.84% Hindi, 2.70% Urdu and 2.00% Kannada as their first language. Urdu and Kannada both had a decline in absolute numbers from 2001 to 2011.

Kolhapur has the highest percentage of Jains of any district in India. Neighbouring Belgaum district in Karnataka comes second.

The district has three centres of tourism,

the Mahlakshmi Temple and Karveer Pee th

Jagadguru Shankaracharya Math in the city of Kolhapur and

Jyotiba temple in Wadi Ratnagiri.

Away from Kolhapur some religious tourism towns are located, Nurdihawadi for Datta Temple and khidrapur for Kopeshwar Temple.

== Educational institutions ==
The Kolhapur district has a good number of educational institutions that provide a range of educational programs - from KG to PG and beyond. The district has Shivaji University located in the city of Kolhapur. The university provides various master and Ph.D. level programs. Shivaji University covers three districts - Kolhapur, Sangli and Satara under its jurisdiction. Apart from the university, Kolhapur district has a number of other renowned educational institutions like Council of Education's Shahaji Law College, Kolhapur CSIBER- , Kolhapur Chhatrapati Shahu Institute of Business Education and Research, Rajaram College Kolhapur, Swami Vivekanand College Kolhapur, D. Y. Patil College of Engineering and Technology, Chhatrapati Shahu Maharaj Government Medical College, Mouni Vidyapeeth, KIT College of Engineering Kolhapur, etc. Kolhapur District is enriched in terms of the availability of quality education of all kinds.

== Economy ==
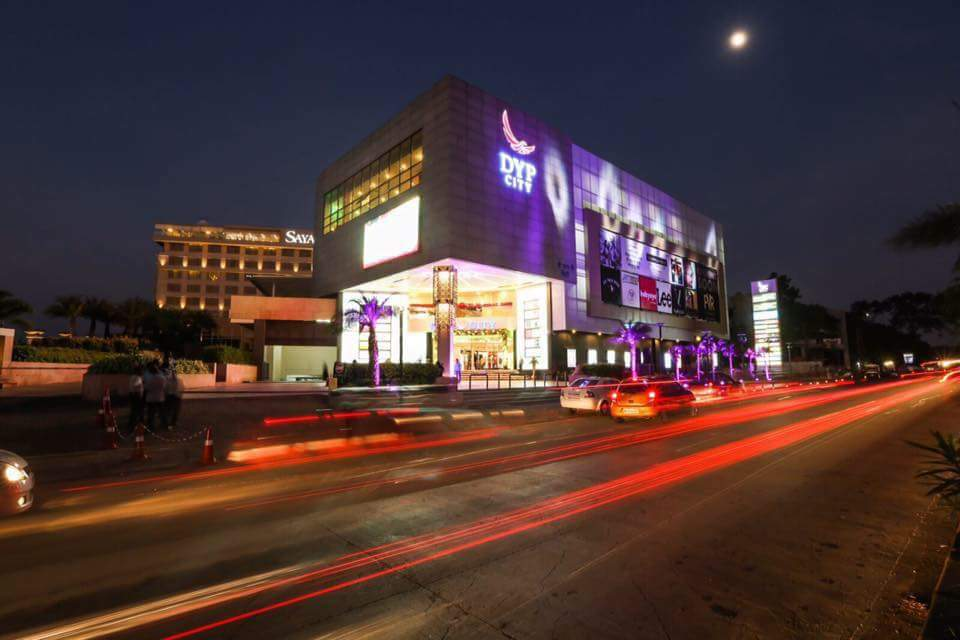
DYP City Mall, Kolhapur

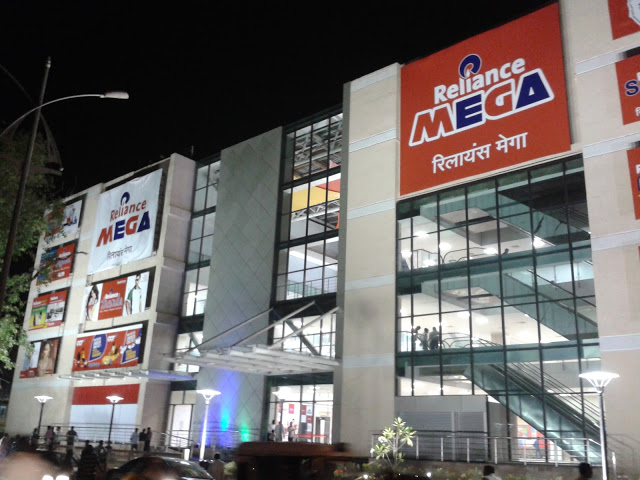
Reliance Mega mall at Kolhapur

=== Manufacturing industry ===
Kolhapur has a Higher per capita domestic product than the states average. It has auto-ancillary, Foundry, and Casting industrial establishments which act as supporting industries for Pune and Bangalore industries.

The city is the home of Kolhapuri chappal, a hand-crafted buffalo leather slipper that is locally tanned using vegetable dyes. Kolhapuri slippers are sold on Mahadwar road. Other handicrafts include: hand block printing of textiles; silver, bead and paste jewellery crafting; pottery; wood carving and lacquerware; brass sheet work and oxidised silver artwork;and lace and embroidery making.

Kolhapur is also an industrial city with approximately 300 foundries producing exports with a value of 15 billion rupees per year. A manufacturing plant of Kirloskar Oil Engines [KOEL] is set up in 5 star MIDC at Kagal near Kolhapur, and the Raymond clothes plant is also located in the same industrial area. Kolhapur has two more industrial areas, Gokul-Shirgaon MIDC, Shiroli MIDC and Shivaji Udyamnagar is an industrial area in the city. Shivaji Udyamnagar has a rich entrepreneurial tradition of more than 100 years and a high skilled artisanship in the area of oil engines.

Kolhapuri jewelry includes a type of necklace called Kolhapuri saaj, patlya (two broad bangles), chinchpeti (choker), tanmani (short necklace), nath (nose ring), and bajuband (an amulet).

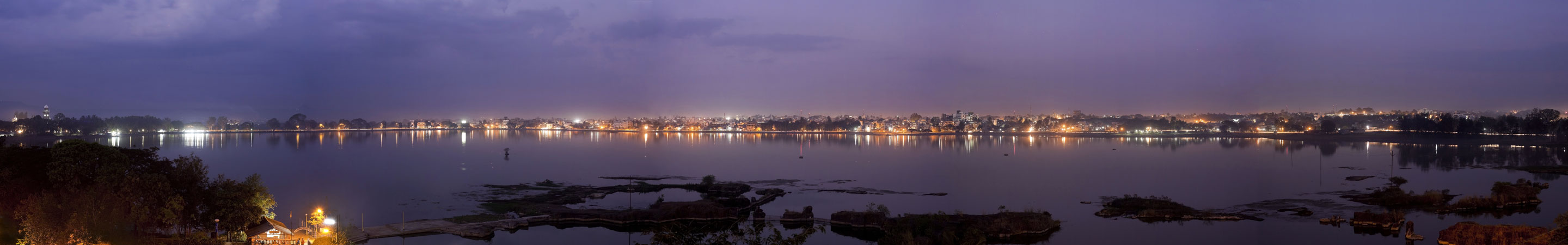
Kolhapur City at night from Rankala lake

== Administration and divisions ==
=== District council ===
Zilla Parishad Kolhapur or District Council Kolhapur is one of the District Councils having jurisdiction in the Kolhapur district. Zilla Parishad has bagged the 2021 first place award of State Level Outstanding Zilla Parishad.

The election to the 2017 Kolhapur Jilha Parishad and panchayat samitis was held from 21 February 2017. This election saw a voter turnout of 60% election.

=== Divisions ===
The district has 12 talukas and 12 panchayat samiti, 2 municipal corporation, 10 municipalities and 1,029 gram panchayats.

Districts, Sub-Divisions and Talukas in Pune Division
Name of Division (Headquarter)	Sr. No.	Districts	Administration	Sub-Division	Taluka	Source
Pune Division; HQ=Pune; Districts=5; SubDivisions=31; Talukas=64	1.	Kolhapur District	HQ-Kolhapur; Sub-Divisions-6; Taluka-12	Panhala	Panhala; Shahuwadi	District website
Pune Division; HQ=Pune; Districts=5; SubDivisions=31; Talukas=64	1.	Kolhapur District	HQ-Kolhapur; Sub-Divisions-6; Taluka-12	Ichalkaranji	Shirol; Hatkanangale	District website
Pune Division; HQ=Pune; Districts=5; SubDivisions=31; Talukas=64	1.	Kolhapur District	HQ-Kolhapur; Sub-Divisions-6; Taluka-12	Karvir	Karveer; Gaganbawada	District website
Pune Division; HQ=Pune; Districts=5; SubDivisions=31; Talukas=64	1.	Kolhapur District	HQ-Kolhapur; Sub-Divisions-6; Taluka-12	Radhanagari	Radhanagari; Kagal	District website
Pune Division; HQ=Pune; Districts=5; SubDivisions=31; Talukas=64	1.	Kolhapur District	HQ-Kolhapur; Sub-Divisions-6; Taluka-12	Bhudargad	Bhudargad; Ajara	District website
Pune Division; HQ=Pune; Districts=5; SubDivisions=31; Talukas=64	1.	Kolhapur District	HQ-Kolhapur; Sub-Divisions-6; Taluka-12	Gadhinglaj	Gadhinglaj; Chandgad	District website

=== Members of Parliament ===
- Chatrapati Shahu Maharaj
  (Kolhapur)
- Dhairyasheel Sambhajirao Mane (BSS)
  (Hatkanangle)

=== Guardian Minister ===
- Prakashrao Abitkar - 15 December 2024 - Incumbent

=== District Magistrate/Collector ===
- Mr. Amol Yedge IAS

=== Sabhapati ===
Sabhapati include:

- For Shahuwadi, Vijay Khot
- For Panhala, Vaishali Patil
- For Hatkanangale, Pradip Patil
- For Shirol, Deepali Parit
- For Kagal, Ramesh Todkar
- For Karvir, Meenakshi Patil
- For Radhanagari, Sonali Patil

== Notable people ==
- Shahu of Kolhapur - Maharaja and a social reformer.
- Tarabai - Maratha Queen and warrior.
- Ramchandra Pant Amatya - One of the Ashta Pradhans for Shivaji Maharaj.
- Santaji Ghorpade - Maratha warrior and Sarsenapati.
- Khanderao Bagal - Social reformer and Vakil of Shahu Maharaj.
- Bhai Madhavrao Bagal - Social reformer, writer, artist, Freedom fighter.
- Baburao Painter - Indian film director.
- Vishnu Digambar Paluskar - Hindustani classical singer, founder of Gandharva Mahavidyalay.
- Sudhir Phadke - Singer and composer.
- Bhalji Pendharkar - Award Winning Director.
- Nanda - Film Actress.
- Suresh Wadkar - Playback Singer.
- Jayant Narlikar - Indian astrophysicist.
- V. Shantaram - Indian filmmaker, film producer and actor.
- Shivaji Sawant - Indian novelist.
- Ranjit Desai - Popular marathi writer.
- Master Vinayak - Indian actor and film director.
- Suniti Ashok Deshpande - Indian educator, writer, translator and interpreter.
- Leena Nair - Ceo of Chanel.
- D. Y. Patil - Indian politician, former governor, educator.
- Arun Sarnaik - Actor and singer.
- Dhondutai Kulkarni - Indian classical singer from the Jaipur-Atrauli gharana.
- Govindrao Tembe - Music Composer.
- B. B. Nimbalkar - Indian cricketer, best known for his score of 443 not out[1] during the 1948–49 Ranji Trophy.
- Dhananjay Mahadik - Indian politician and former member of parliament.
- Chandrakant Patil - Indian politician, current Minister of Higher and Technical Education of Maharashtra.
- Ramesh Deo - Indian film and television actor.
- Vasantrao Ghatge - Indian entrepreneur, business magnate, industrialist and a professor.
- Jagdish Khebudkar - Marathi littérateur and lyricist of Marathi cinema.
- Ashutosh Gowariker - Indian film director, actor, screenwriter and producer.
- Madhavrao Bagal - Writer, artist, journalist, social reformer, political activist, orator and a freedom fighter.
- Anant Mane - Film director.
- Satej Patil - Politician and Home Minister of State for Maharashtra Government.
- Padmini Kolhapure - Film Actress.
- Shruti Sadolikar - Indian classical singer of the khyal style in the Jaipur-Atrauli gharana.
- Sadashivrao Dadoba Mandlik - Former Member of Parliament and NCP leader.
- Sanjay Mandlik - Past Member of Parliament and Shiv Sena Leader.
- Bhanu Athaiya - Indian costume designer and painter.
- Sangram Chougule - Body builder, Mr Universe winner (2012), Mr India (6-time winner), Mr Maharashtra (5-time winner).
- Suhas Khamkar - Body builder.
- Balakrishnabuwa Ichalkaranjikar. Indian vocalist of Khayal-genre of Hindustani classical music
- Subhash Khot FRS, mathematician and theoretical computer scientist and winner of multiple awards.

== See also ==
- Gandhinagar, Kolhapur
- Mhakave
- Pargad
- Ichalkaranji
- Kalanidhigad
- Gandharvgad
