= Bhavani Mandap =

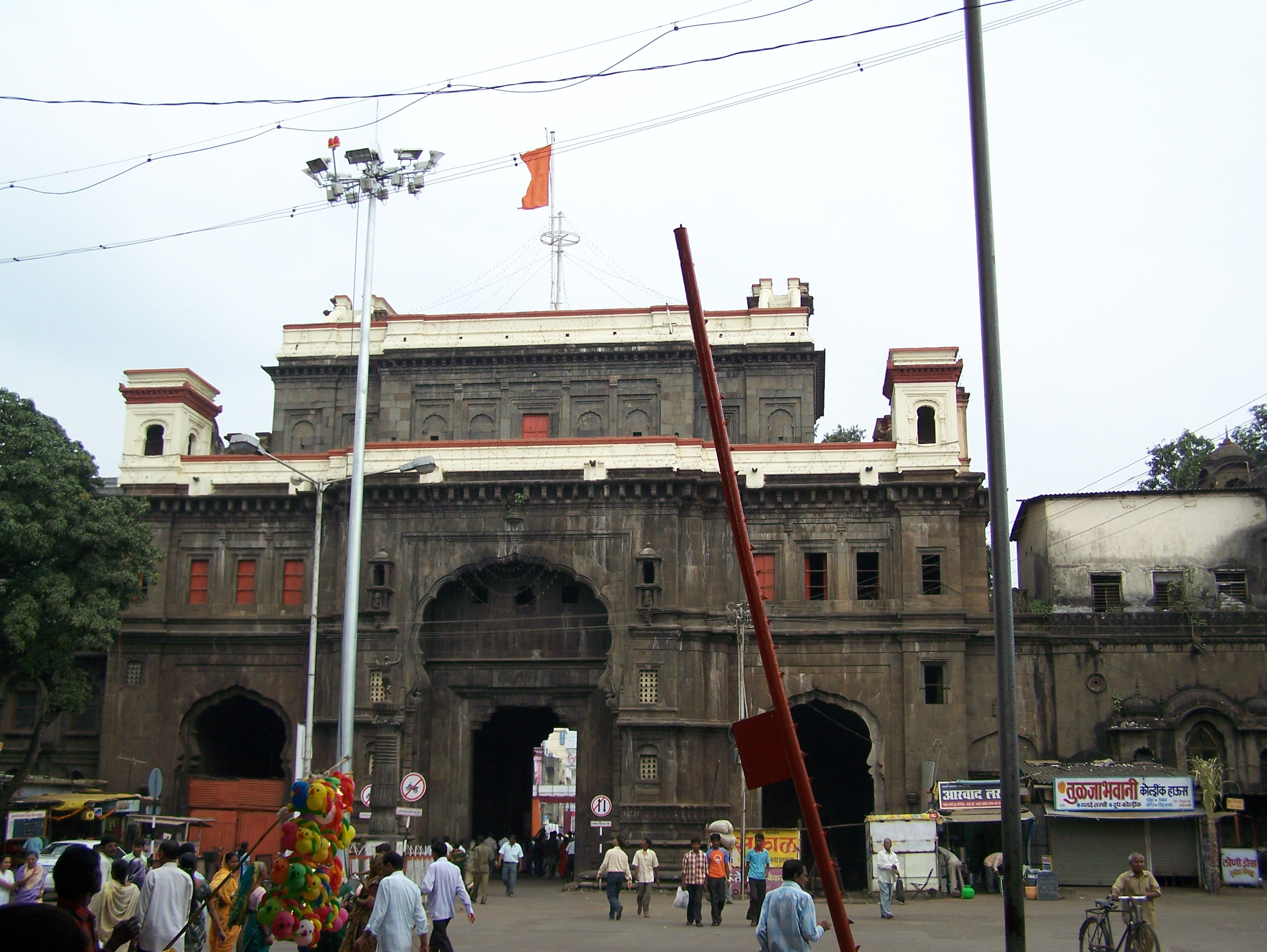

- Location within Maharashtra

General information
- Location: Kolhapur, Maharashtra, India
- Coordinates: 16.694871°N 74.224195°E

Bhavani Mandap is a historical building situated in the walled city center of Kolhapur in southern Maharashtra, India. It is located near the famous and mammoth Mahalaxmi Temple on the west.

== Religious significance ==
It is a royal palace of the Maharaja of Kolhapur. It used to be a durbar of the Chhatrapati Maharaja.

== History ==
Bhavani Mandap was an important meeting venue in yesteryears. It housed the offices of various court officials and was centre of many celebrations. It also saw a famous murder in the central courtyard. The place has the nostalgic charm and typical architecture of the British Raj bringing back memories of the rich princely state Kolhapur used to be.

== Present Time ==
At Bhavani Mandap, we can find the life size statue of Kolhapur's most loved prince Shahu Maharaj. Although, he was deemed king by the city dwellers, most of his political life was spent under the Raj. On display are stuffed animals actually hunted by Shri Shahu Maharaj including a giant bison (who has achieved some spiritual importance considering the amount of saffron spread over it), Panthers, a pair of deer and few others. It also exhibits a modest wooden throne believed to be the one used by Shivaji on his visits to Kolhapur, strengthening the idea that He was more a man on a mission with not much regards to worldly comfort. In its present form it functions as a collective tomb of Kolhapur's Maratha royalty.

== Myths ==
It is said that there is a tunnel leading to Bhavani Mandap from Panhala, the hillside fort about 20 km away from Kolhapur built to allow an escape-route for warring Maratha soldiers. Any attempts to discover this tunnel or its discovery have not been heard.
