= Suhas Khamkar =

Indian bodybuilder

- Professional bodybuilder
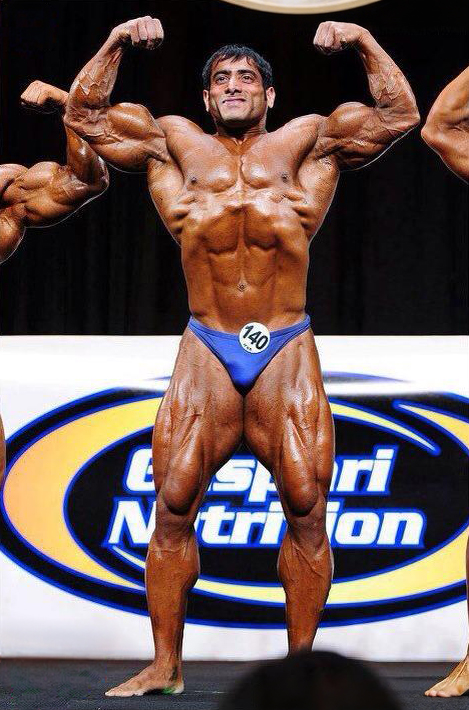
- Suhas Khamkar at Arnold Amateur 2013

Personal info
- Born: 9 August 1980 (age 46); Kolhapur, Maharashtra, India

Best statistics
- Height: 5 ft 7 in (170 cm)
- Weight: 85–90 kg (187–198 lb)

Professional (Pro) career
- Pro-debut: Mr. India; 2010
- Best win: Mr. Amateur Olympia (Champion of Champion); 2018

Suhas Khamkar (born 9 August 1980) is a professional bodybuilder from India.

== Early life ==
Khamkar is a native of Kolhapur region and comes from a family of fitness experts and bodybuilders. His inspiration for bodybuilding traces back to his hometown Kolhapur, where he grew up watching wrestlers and bodybuilders . At age 16 Khamkar drew inspiration from Arnold Schwarzenegger and sought to become a world champion bodybuilder.

== Career ==
Khamkar is the first Indian bodybuilder to win his pro card after winning the Mr. Amateur Olympia contest in October 2018.

In the 2012 Mr. India event, Khamkar placed 1st in the 80 kg category.

Khamkar was an employee of Central Railway of India. He was the first Indian bodybuilder to win a national level gold medal in the Railway national competitions. In 2010, Khamkar became the first Indian bodybuilder to win the Mr. Asia contest. He placed second in the 2012 amateur Mr. Olympia held in Kuwait and placed second in the 2017 Amateur Asia Mr. Olympia contest.

== Achievements ==
- Awarded the Shiv Chhatrapati Krida Puraskar by the Government of Maharashtra in 2008
- Shivpremi Rajya Gaurav Puraskar 2019.
- First Indian Bodybuilder to achieve PRO CARD.
- Mr. Amateur Olympia (2018)-Champion of Champion.
- Mr. Asia Body Building Title (2010).
- Mr. Olympia Amateur Body Building 1st Runner-up (2012).
- Mr. World Bodybuilding 1st Runner-up (2010–11).
- Ten-Time Mr. India Body Building Title (2004, 2006 To 2015).
- eight Times Mr.Maharashtra Title (2006 To 2008 & 2010 To 2014).
- Nine-Time Mr. All India Railway Gold (2004 To 2012).
- Four-Time Mr.Shivsena Body Building Title (2006, 2008 To 2010).
- Four-Time Mr.Mumbai Mayor Body Building Title (2002, 2003, 2007, 2008).
- Four-Time Mr.New Mumbai Mayor Body Building Title (2003, 2007, 2009, 2010).
- Five-Time Mr. Hindu Hruday Samarat Body Building Title (2005, 2008 To 2011).
- Mr. Goa Body Building Title (2006).
- Two-Times Mr.Mayor Kolhapur Body Building Title (2001, 2005).
- Mr. Mayor Ujjain (M.P.) Bodybuilding Title (2010).
- Three-Time Mr.Maharashtra Kamgar Body Building Title (1997 To 1999).
- Navi Mumbai mahapaur shree—participate (1996)
- pune festival shree—participate 1996
- Rajarampuri gym maryadit—1996 (Third rank)
- Junior Maharashtra shree pune—1996 (Third rank)
- Thane mahapaur shree—1996 participate
- Tarun Bharat shree—1996 participate.
- Youth Development club pattankodoli shree—1997 (Third rank)
- Shahu mohotsav shree—1997 (First rank)
- Maharashtra kamgar shree—1997 ( second rank)
- Desai health club raybag shree—1997 ( Third rank)
- Maratha shree—1997 (Third rank)
- Pattankadoli shree—1997 (Third rank)
- Vadange shree—1997( third rank)
- Nashik mahapaur shree—1997 participate
- Sangali mahapaur Shree—1997( fourth rank)
- Yuvakansha Mitra manual shree—1998 (Third rank)
- Sankeshvar shree—1998 (second rank)
- Colleage shree—1998 (Champion of Champions)
- Walawalkar shree—1998 (Champion)
- Vadange shree—1998 (Third rank)
- Maharashtra kamgar shree—1998 (Champion of Champions)
- Padli Khurda shree—1998 (second)
- Nanded mahapaur shree—1998 fourth
- Ashta Shree—1998 Champion
- Raybag shree—1998 second
- Kolhapur shree—1998 Champions of Champion
- Pacchim new Bharat shree—1998 second
- Yuvakansha Shree—1998 Champion
- Sangrul shree—1998 Third
- Maratha yuvak sanga shree—1998 Third
- Jr. Maharashtra shree—1998 Fourth
- International trial federation competition—1998 fifth
- Mumbai mahapaur shree—1998 participate
- Kumar ghat mahapaur shree—1998 third
- Shahu shree—1999 second
- Kamgar shree—1999 Champions of Champion
- Raybag shree—1999 Champion
- Maharashtra kamgar shree—1999 Second
- BPS Swatentradin shree—1999 Champions of champion
- Sangli mahapaur shree—1999 Champions of champion
- Thane mahapaur shree—1999 participate
- Patankar katha shree—1999 Champion
- Liberty shree—1999 third
- Valvalkar shree—1999 Champion
- Vasagde shree—1999 Champion
- Marathe yuvak sangh shree—1999 Third
- Ashta Shree—1999 Champion
- KD mangave Shree—1999 Champion
- Fighters Shree—1999 Champion
- Patan shree—1999 Champion
- Yuvakansha Shree—1999 Champion
- Shiv goda patil vikramnagar shree—1999 Champion
- Vaida patil shree—1999 Champion
- Kolhapur shree—1999 champion of champion
- Jr. Maharashtra shree—1999 Third
- Shinav kokan—1999 Champion
- Tarun Bharat shree—1999 Sixth
- Shankarrav shinde shree—1999 Champion
- Shinde sanskrutik mandal shree—1999 Champion
- Ekta shree—1999 Champion
- Pharli Shree—2000 second
- Sharad Powar shree—2000 Second
- Mr. Kolhapur—2000 Champions of champion
- College shree—2000 Champions of champion
- Utreshvar shree—2000 Champion
- Malkapur shree—2000 Champions of champion
- New Mumbai mahapaur shree—2000fourth
- Tarun Bharat shree—2000 fifth
- Shahu shree—2000 second
- Vishvashanti shree—2000 Champions of champion
- Valvalkar shree—2000 Champions of champion
- Dharmavir raje Sambhaji Shree—2000 Champions of champion
- Rotari shree—2000 Champions of champion
- Uttur shree—2000 second
- Kundal shree—2000 second
- Jamadar shree—2000 Champion
- Vikramnagar shree—2000 Champion
- Jr.maharashtra shree—2000 Second
- Practice shree—2000 Champion
- Vai Shree—2000 Champion
- Gokul shirgav shree—2000 Champion
- Jr. Maharashtra shree—2000 Second
- BPS sports shree—2000 Champions of champion
- SP group shree—2000 Champions of champion
- Subhrav gavli talim—2000 Champion
- Sangrul shree—2000 Champion
- Phonda ghat—2000 Champion
- Sangram siha Mohite patil shree—2001 Champion
- Shahu shree—2001 Champions of champion
- Man of body plus—2001 Champions of champion
- Kundal shree—2001 Champions of champion
- Major R.G patil shree—2001 Champions of champion
- Vijay siha shree—2001 Champions of champion
- Navratna shree shirgav—2001 Champions of champion
- Malkapur shree—2001 Champions of champion
- Bajirav appa shree—2001 Champions of champion
- Bheem shree—2001 Champions of champion
- Valavalkar shree—2001 Champions of champion
- Shahid Abhijeet shree—2001 Champions of champion
- Vijay Shree—2001 Champions of champion
- Shahu sugar shree—2001 Champions of champion
- Vivek shree—2001 Champions of champion
- Nangivali shree—2001 Champions of champion
- Kasbe Digraj shree—2001 champion
- SP group—2001 Champions of champion
- Bhosale vadi shree—2001 Champions of champion
- Hercules Gymnashiam—2001 Champions of champion
- Pattan kadoli—2001 Champions of champion
- Shahu shree BPS Kolhapur—2001 Champions of champion
- Pacchim Maharashtra shree—2001 champion
- Mahapaur shree—2001 Champion
- Bal Mitra shree—2001 Champions of champion
- Ranjeet shree—2001 Champions of champion
- College shree Shivaji vidyapitha—2001 Champions of champion
- Narayan rane shree—2001 Champions of champion
- Tarun Bharat shree—2001 fifth
- Kadgav shree—2001 Champions of champion
- All India interunivercity—2001 third
- Bhagva Rakshakakshi—2001 Champions of champion
- Jr. Maharashtra shree—2001 second
- Pattan kadoli shree—2001 Champions of champion
- Karad arban bank shree—2001 Champion
- Malkapur shree—2001 Champions of champion
- Fighter sports shree—2001 Champions of champion
- Tatysaheb kaur varna—2001 Champion
- Swastika shree—2001 Champions of champion
- Hercules Gymnashiam—2001 Champions of champion
- KD mangave Shree—2001 Champions of champion
- Vaigade Shree—2001 Champions of champion
- Utkarsh shree—2001 Champions of champion
- Vadgav shree—2001 Champions of champion
- Gokul shirgav shree—2001 champion
- Lokmanya shree—2002 Champions of champion
- Ishwar sports chashak—2002 Champions of champion
- Shree Bal hanuman shree—2002 Champions of champion
- Vyayam mandal shree—2002 Champions of champion
- College shree—2002 Champions of champion
- Hercules Gymnashiam—2002 Champions of champion
- Karad arban bank—2002 Champions of champion
- Shiv shree—2002 Champions of champion
- Vengurle Hercules—2002 Champions of champion
- Gajgeshvar shree—2002 Champions of champion
- Tarun Bharat shree—2002 Third
- Bhosale vadi shree—2002 Champions of champion
- Paltan festival—2002 champion
- Golden shree—2002 Champions of champion
- Malkapur shree—2002 Champions of champion
- Hutatma shree—2002 Champions of champion
- Mumbai mahapaur shree—2002 Champion
- Anil gujar shree—2002 Champions of champion
- Fedretion cup rashtriya—2002 Champions of champion
- All India university—2002 second
- Narayan rane shree—2002 Champions of champion
- Abhijeet shree—2002 Champions of champion
- Shahu shree—2002 Champions of champion
- Golden shree—2002 Champions of champion
- Karambali shree—2002 Champions of champion
- Rashtriya hawraha west Bangal—2002 Best of ten
- Open Congress shree—2002 Champions of champion
- Shrimanta Valavalkar shree—2002 Champions of champion
- Bal Mitra shree—2002 Champions of champion
- Lokmanya shree—2002 Champions of champion
- Tarun Bharat shree—2003 Champions of champion
- Shahu sakhar shree—2003 Champions of champion
- Shiv Samarth shree—2003 Champions of champion
- Golden shree—2003 Champions of champion
- Phonda ghat shree—2003 Champions of champion
- Prashant shree—2003 Champions of champion
- Bajirav appa shree—2003 Champions of champion
- Varna shree—2003 Champions of champion
- Lokmanya shree—2003 Champions of champion
- College shree—2003 Champions of champion
- Pachgav shree—2003 Champions of champion
- New Mumbai mahapaur shree—2003 Champions of champion
- Shree shivshankar shree—2003 Champions of champion
- Hutatma jotiram Chavgule—2003 Champions of champion
- Karambali shree—2003 Champions of champion
- Kai ani gujar shree—2003 Champions of champion
- Bal Bharat krida mandal icchalkaranji shree—2003 Champions of champion
- Fedretion shree—2003 Champions of champion
- Mumbai mahapaur shree—2003 Champions of champion
- Icchalkaranji shree—2003 Champions of champion
- Hatkalangle shree—2004 Champions of champion
- Kolhapur Hercules shree—2004 Champions of champion
- Kundal shree—2004 Champions of champion
- Zee Shree—2004 Champions of champion
- Atal shree—2004 Champions of champion
- Maharashtra shree—2004 second
- Raje Sambhaji Shree—2004 Champions of champion
- Sharad shree—2004 Champions of champion
- Babdev shree—2004 Champions of champion
- Mi kolhapur Hercules—2004 Champions of champion
- Pantha Valvalkar shree—2004 Champions of champion
- Sangram shree—2004 Champions of champion
- Sadguru shree—2004 Champions of champion
- Hindu hruday samratha—2005 Champions of champion
- Pacchim Maharashtra shree—2005 Champions of champion
- Tarun Bharat shree—2005 Champions of champion
- Sangharsh shree—2005 Champions of champion
- Charlies sports club—2005 Champions of champion
- Vile Parle shree—2005 Champions of champion
- Railway interdivision—2005 Champions of champion
- Parag shree—2005 Champions of champion
- All India Railway—2005 Champions of champion
- Om samartha Bharat shree—2005 Champions of champion
- Raje Maharashtra shree—2005 Champions of champion
- Hiral shree—2005 Champions of champion
- Ganesh shree—2005 Champions of champion
- Nagar vikas Shree—2005 Champions of champion
- Narayan rane shree—2005 Champions of champion
- Vasai shree—2005 Champions of champion
- Sada hasan shree—2005 Champions of champion
- North India champion—2005 Champions of champion
- Jay ambe shree—2005 Champions of champion
- Sadguru shree—2005 Champions of champion
- Khermode shree—2005 Champions of champion
- Jr. Maharashtra shree—2005 Champions of champion
- Sharad shree—2005 Champions of champion
- Atal shree—2005 Champions of champion
- Vile Parle shree—2005 Champions of champion
- Amravati mahapaur shree—2005 Champions of champion
- Maharashtra shree—2006 Champion
- Master Goa—2006 Champions of champion
- Pacchim Maharashtra shree—2006 Champions of champion
- Shivsena shree—2006 Champions of champion
- Tarun Bharat shree—2006 Champions of champion
- Yashvant shree—2006 Champions of champion
- Parag shree—2006 Champions of champion
- Kolhapur mahapaur shree—2006 Champions of champion
- Sangrul shree—2006 Champions of champion
- All India Railway—2006 Second
- Manodhirya shree—2006 Champions of champion
- Bharat shree—2006 Third
- Balvan shree—2006 Champions of champion
- Shivneri shree—2006 Champions of champion
- Chunna bhatti shree—2006 Champions of champion
- Narayan shree—2006 Champions of champion
- Shivsena shree—2006 Champions of champion
- Mora Bhai dar mahapaur shree—2006 Champions of champion
- Rashtra vadi shree—2006 Champions of champion
- Shivsena shree—2006 Champions of champion
- Eksargav Devi shree—2006 Champions of champion
- Om samarth Bharat shree—2007 Champions of champion
- Hruday Samarth shree—2007 Champions of champion
- Poisir gym shree—2007 Champions of champion
- Rukadi shree—2007 Champions of champion
- Satam shree—2007 Champions of champion
- Mumbai shree—2007 Champions of champion
- Indian Railway—2007 Champions of champion
- Ma. Prakash awde shree—2007 Champions of champion
- Bharat shree—2007 Champions of champion
- Bharat shree—2007 second
- Pacchim Maharashtra shree—2007 Champions of champion
- Lahuji shree—2007 Champions of champion
- Navi Mumbai mahapaur shree—2007 Champions of champion
- Rashtravadi shree—2007 Champions of champion
- Amdar shree—2007 Champions of champion
- Rashtravadi shree—2007 Champions of champion
- Saheb shree—2007 Champions of champion
- Parle mohotsav shree—2007 Champions of champion
- Parle mohstav shree—2007 Champions of champion
- Rajypoisar gym shree—2008 Champions of champion
- Rajya Shivsena shree -2008 Champions of champion
- Rajya mavla shree-2008 Champions of champion
- Rajya hinduhruday samrat shree-2008 Champions of champion
- Ekta shree -2008 Champions of champion
- Gurudatt shree-2008 Champions of champion
- Rastrwadi shree -2008 Champions of champion
- Pimpleshwar mhadev hanuman shree-2008 Champions of champion
- Kalyan dombiwali mahapour shree-2008 Champions of champion
- Sudarshan shree-2008 Champions of champion
- Aamdar chashak-2008 Champions of champion
- All India Railway -2008 Champions of champion
- Mumbai mahapaur shree-2008 Champions of champion
- Parag shree -2008 Champions of champion
- Aarogyadham shree-2008 Champions of champion
- Aambedkar shree-2008 Champions of champion
- Shahu sakhar shree-2008 Champions of champion
- All India Railway -2008 Champions of champion
- Karya Samarath harishchandar kakde shree-2008 Champions of champion
- Aamdar shree-2008 Champions of champion
- Narayan koregav shree-2009 Champions of champion
- Gajanan shree-2009 Champions of champion
- Navi Mumbai mahapaur shree -2009 Champions of champion
- Shivsena mharasta shree-2009 Champions of champion
- Hindu hruday Samrath shree-2009 Champions of champion
- Kadiwali shree-2009 Champions of champion
- Chembur shree-2009 Champions of champion
- Mr. Stentat shree-2009 Champions of champion
- Parag shree-2009 Champions of champion
- Bhagva shree-2009 Champions of champion
- Parag shree-2009 Champions of champion
- Rastrawadi shree-2009 Champions of champion
- Parag shree-2009 Champions of champion
- Parle -2009 Champions of champion
- Shivsena shree-2009 Champions of champion
- Parag shree -2009 Champions of champion
- Swarajya shree-2010 Champions of champion
- Aamdar shree-2010 Champions of champion
- Navi Mumbai mahapaur shree -2010Champions of champion
- Raj shree-2010 Champions of champion
- Shivsena shree -2010 Champions of champion
- Manse shree -2010 Champions of champion
- Anna patil shree-2010 Champions of champion
- Superim shree-2010 Champions of champion
- Shivsena shree-2010 Champions of champion
- Suprim shree-2010 Champions of champion
- Kandiwali shree-2010 Champions of champion
- Ambarnath navnirman shree-2010 Champions of champion
- Marathi Hruday Samarath shree-2010 Champions of champion
- jayant shree-2010 Champions of champion
- Manse boriwali shree -2010 Champions of champion
- Dharmveer shree-2010 Champions of champion
- Lokadhikar shree-2010 Champions of champion
- Kalyan dombiwali mahapaur shree -2010 Champions of champion
- Sachin Aahari shree-2010 Champions of champion
- Nagar Sevak shree-2010 Champions of champion
- Parag shree-2010 Champions of champion
- Shangri-la shree-2010 Champions of champion
- Bheem shree-2010 Champions of champion
- Shanta Cruz shree-2010 Champions of champion
- Aamdar shree-2010 Champions of champion
- Koregavkar shree-2010 Champions of champion
- Shivsai shree-2010 Champions of champion
- Satish sugar classic -2010 Champions of champion
- Mhapour shree-2010 Champions of champion
- Sainath shree-2010 Champions of champion
- Samrath Mahadik shree-2010 Champions of champion
- Dahisar shree-2011 Champions of champion
- Hinduhruday samratha shree-2011 Champions of champion
- Suprimo shree-2011 Champions of champion
- Badlapur shree-2011 Champions of champion
- Hinduhruday samratha shree-2011 Champions of champion
- Nagar Sevak shree-2011 Champions of champion
- Aamdar shree-2011 Champions of champion
- Hardcore shree-2011 Champions of champion
- Santakruz shree-2011 Champions of champion
- solapur shree-2011 Champions of champion
- Vashi mahapour shree-2011 Champions of champion
- Guru Datta shree-2011 Champions of champion
