= Temblai =

Religious deity in India

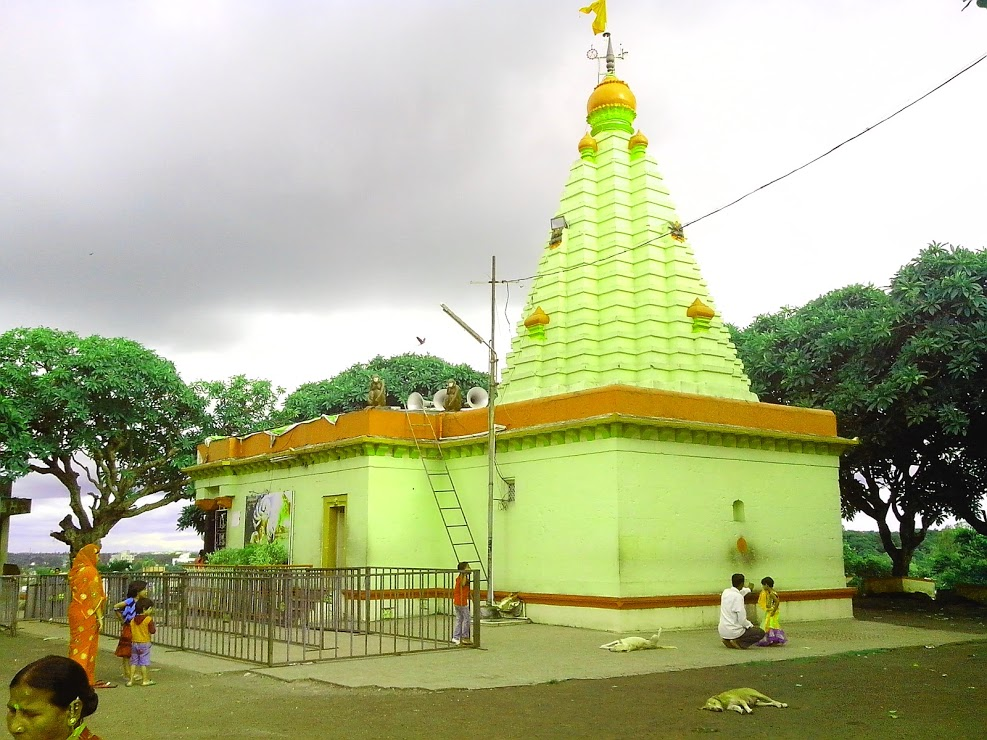
Tryamboli temple on Temblai hill, Kolhapur, Maharashtra, India

Temblai Devi or Tryamboli (as known locally) is form of Renuka devi, an incarnation of Goddess Durga and the presiding deity of temple located on a hilltop in the eastern part of Kolhapur, Maharashtra, India.

On account of the temple, the hillock on which the temple is located is known as Temblai hill. The temple complex has two temples, the bigger temple on the southern end is Temblai devi while the one on the northeastern side is a smaller one dedicated to Yamai devi. The location is flanked on the northern side by a road and the southern side by the territorial army quarters. Devotees, especially women visit the temple and pray to marry a man of their choice or if married, wish and pray for the long and healthy life of their husband. It is also a well-known local tourist spot for visitors and locals. The Temblai temple complex has been recognized as one of the many places to visit for tourists coming to the city. There exists another temple of Temblai devi near the Panchganga river at Kadamwadi a short distance away from this grand temple.

The temple complex has a large idol of Ganpati in the open plateau section on the northeastern side of the temple. Next to the Ganpati idol is a small commemorative bust statue of Chhatrapati Shivaji built by the Devasthan committee. The local authorities have developed this area with a small children's park. In the pre-independence era, the hillock was a centre for treating tuberculosis patients on account of fresh air winds blowing in over the hill.

Another relatively lesser known temple of Goddess Temblai is located in the city on the banks of the Panchaganga river at Kadamwadi on the northeastern side of the city.

== Legend ==
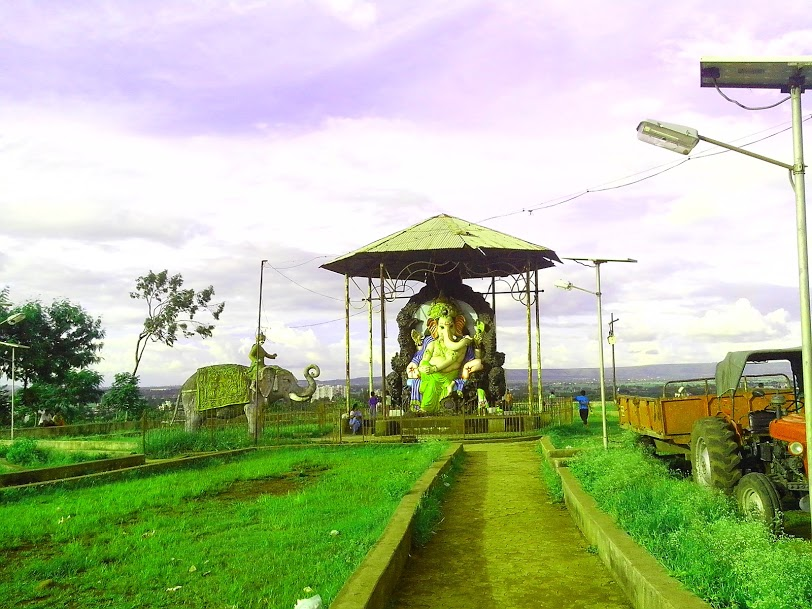
Ganesha statue at the Temblai hill temple complex

Local legends say that Goddess Renuka is the sister of Mahalaxmi and she actively supported Mahalaxmi in her endeavours to slay the demons in the region. However, after the wars Mahalaxmi did not accord her due respect to Goddess Renuka and she came down to the hill and sat there with her back towards Mahalaxmi. This is the reason why the idol of Mahalaxmi at her temple faces the west and that of the Goddess Renuka at Temblai faces the east. Every year during Navratri there is a procession that celebrates the reconciliation of the two sisters on the fifth day of Lalitpanchami.

== Culture and celebration ==
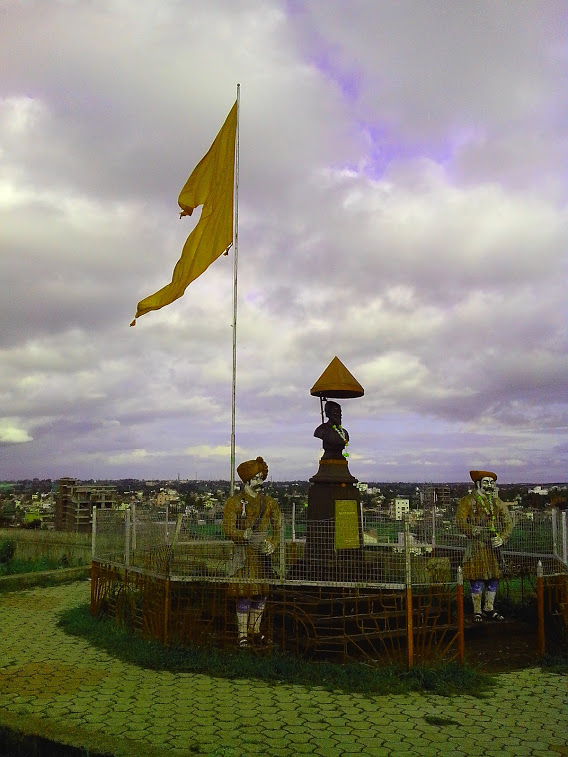
A bust statue of the founder of the Maratha empire, Shivaji inside the temple complex

In the month of Shravan, pilgrims flock to the temple for the annual pilgrimage known as Temblai yatra (jatra) where people from far off areas of Kolhapur and Belgaum district arrive to worship the Goddess. Every year during Navratri, on the fifth day of Lalitapanchami, a palkhi procession is taken from the Mahalaxmi temple to Temblai mandir at Temblai hill. As of 2013, over 1 million devotees visited the temple during Navratri festival. Local dialects use a common salutation to the Goddess Tembali chya navane chang bhala, this has extensively been used in sholkas and bhajans that devotees sing and play during the annual pilgrimage and other times at their homes. During the festival special arrangements are made by the administration to manage traffic and diversions for the convenience of the devotees. The royal family of Shahu II had special regard for the Temblai fair as people had a special importance for his presence during the event.

Another legend from the Karvir Puran states that Temblai, the younger sister of Mahalaxmi, left the city of Kolhapur 1800 years ago and came over to the hillock three miles from the city and remained there with her back to her elder sister at Mahalaxmi temple. Every year in the month of Ashvin, on the fifth day of the bright moon, the elder sister Mahalaxmi visits her younger sister at Temblai. The festival is now celebrated as traditional event where a procession is carried out with Mahalaxmi placed in a palkhi and followed by a young unmarried girl cutting a pumpkin to commemorate the killing of the demon Kolhasur by Mahalaxmi Ambabai. Temblai hill hosts a fair in the temple complex that has 15000–20000 pilgrims. There are offerings and distribution of sweets to the Goddess. The fair has food and toy stalls along with fun rides attractions for children. In October 2021, the Kolhapur Municipal corporation announced the launch of a special bus service during Navratri for pilgrims to visit the Temblai, Mahalakshmi, Jyotiba, Balumama and Nrusinhwadi temples in the region. However the authorities did not allow devotees for the traditional kohala ceremony for second year in a row amid concerns of the COVID-19 pandemic.

The royal family of the Maratha empire had also been actively participating in the temple celebrations. On one instance, the queens of the royal family of Kolhapur had invited Shahu II to perform a ceremony at the Temblai festival after his marriage.

In 2009, the Temblai temple at Panchganga ghat was also the venue for the Kolhapur municipal corporation event of Rankala mahotsav. In 2015, a five member heritage committee of the Kolhapur Municipal Corporation declared Temblai as a heritage structure under the immediate protection category.

== Temblai locality and the army ==
The Temblai area is a formation of three hillocks, one of which has the Renuka devi temple complex. The second one has a water tank built over it. The third one on the opposite side of the road was donated by the royal family of Chhatrapati of Kolhapur in the 1950s for utilization by the Indian army territorial army contingent. Prior to this the hillock was the headquarter and barrack of the royal army called Rajaram rifles (that later merged with Maratha regiment in 1951) that was under Chattrapati's command during colonial times. In December 2018, an event exhibition was organized for citizens by the territorial army to commemorate the armed forces flag day. This exhibition had a display of various arms and ammunition including machine guns, rocket launchers and grenade launchers. There was a small function too to felicitate family members of martyrs. The Temblai hillock is a small plateau overlooking the areas of Ruikar colony, Unchgaon and Vikram nagar. The locality towards the eastern side of the temple is a valley area and is known as Temblai wadi by the name of the presiding deity of the temple.
