= Kolhapur =

- City
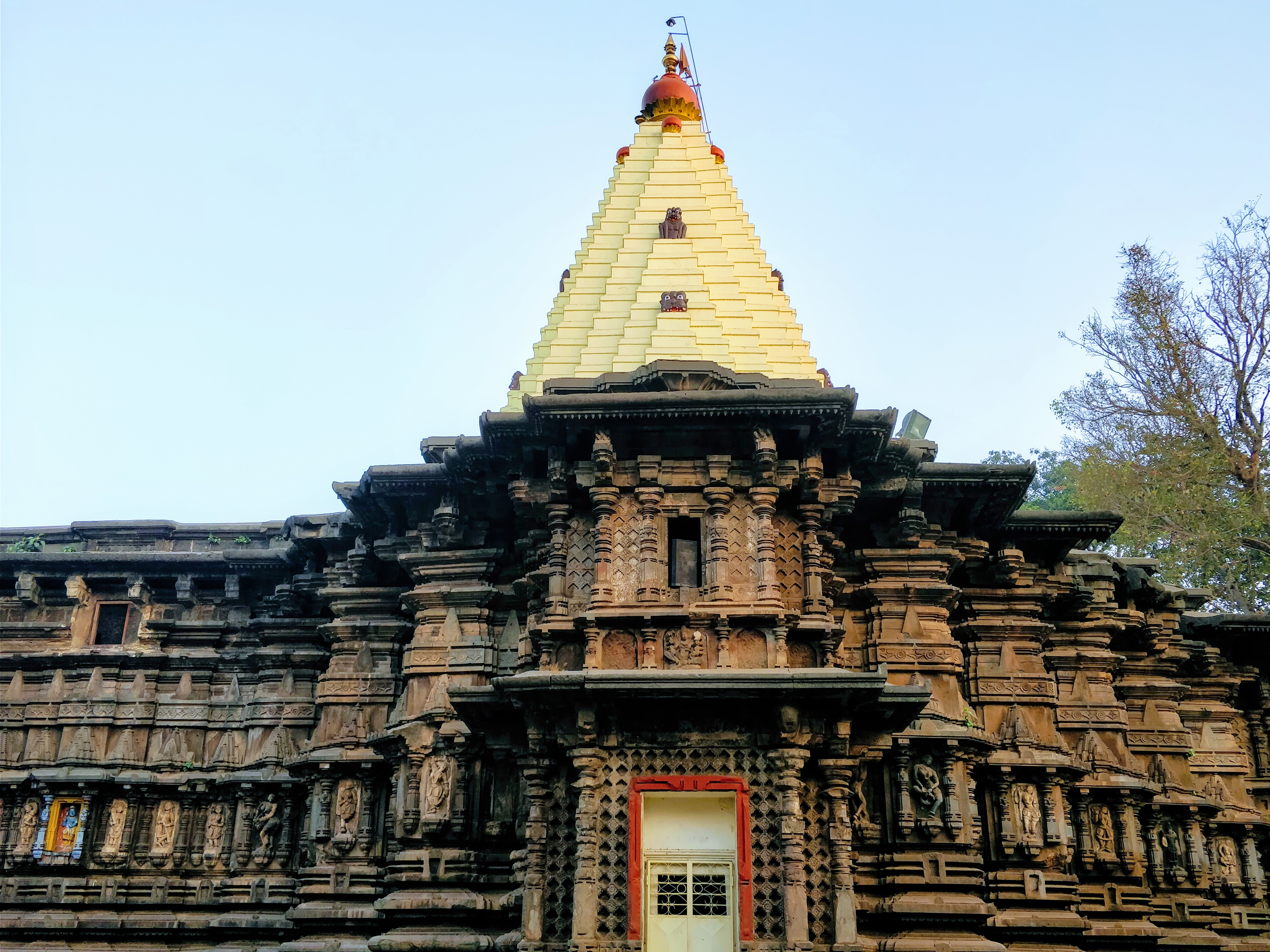
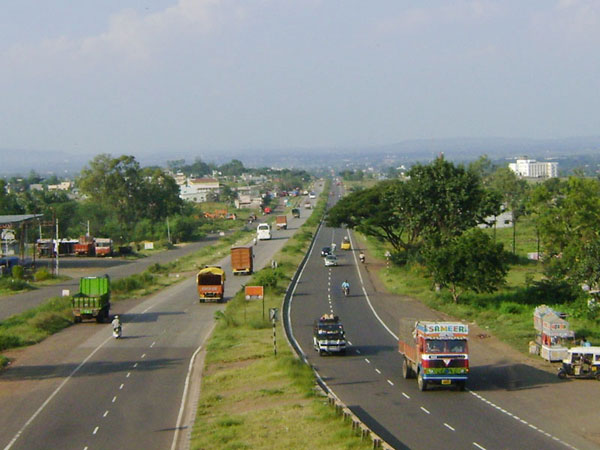
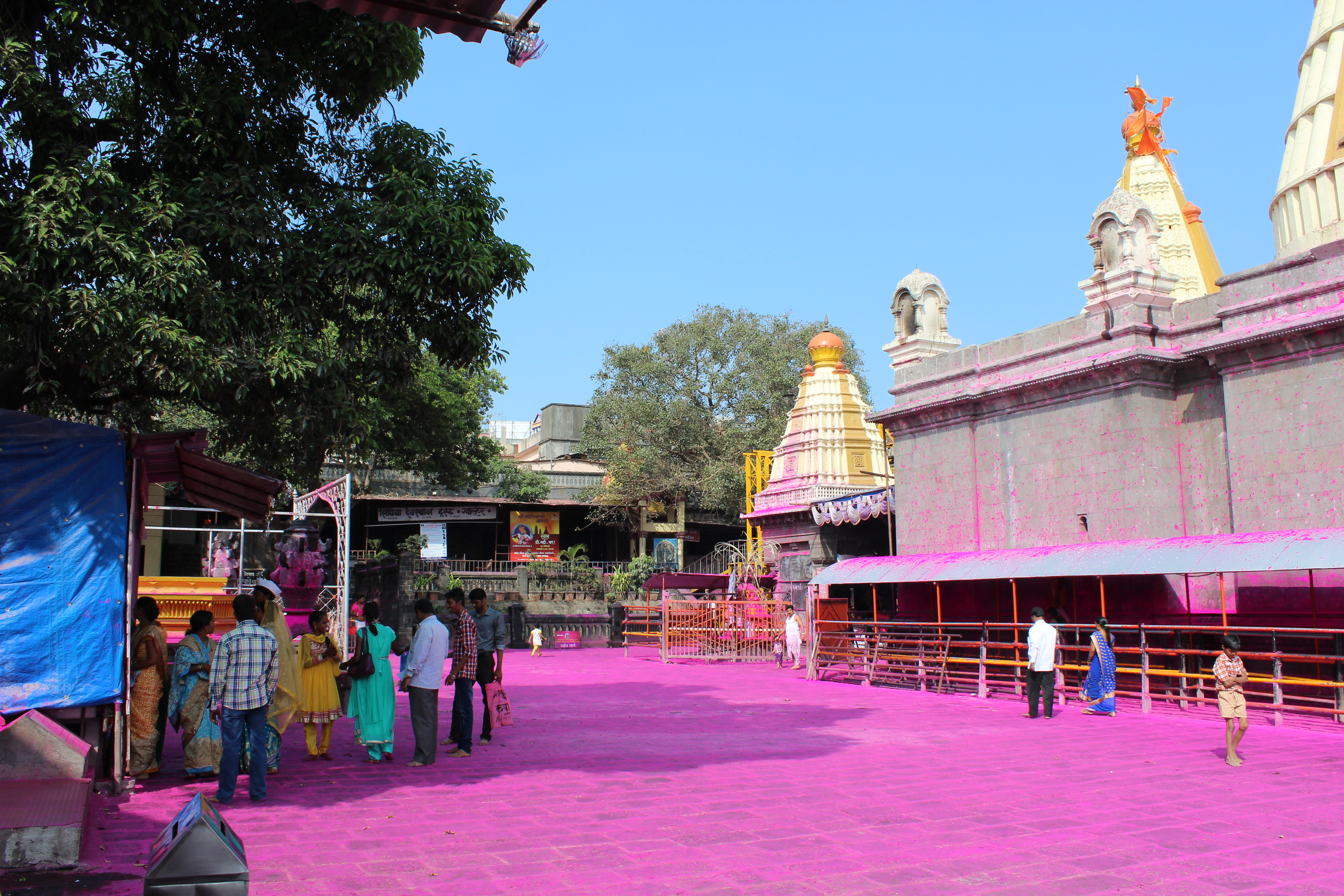
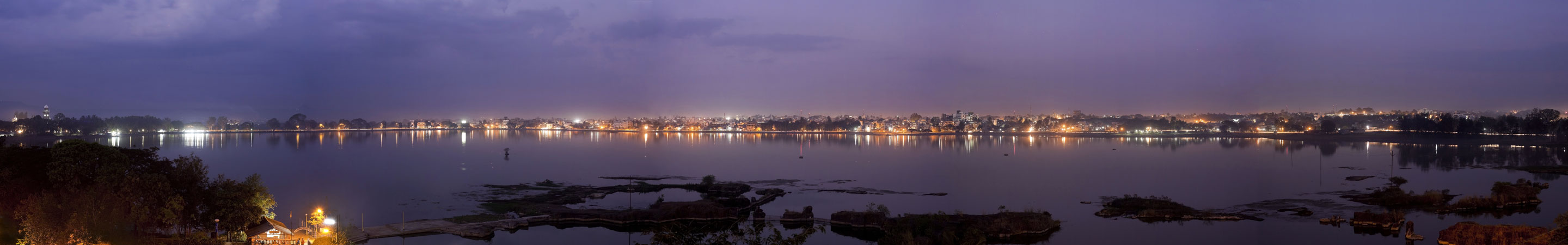
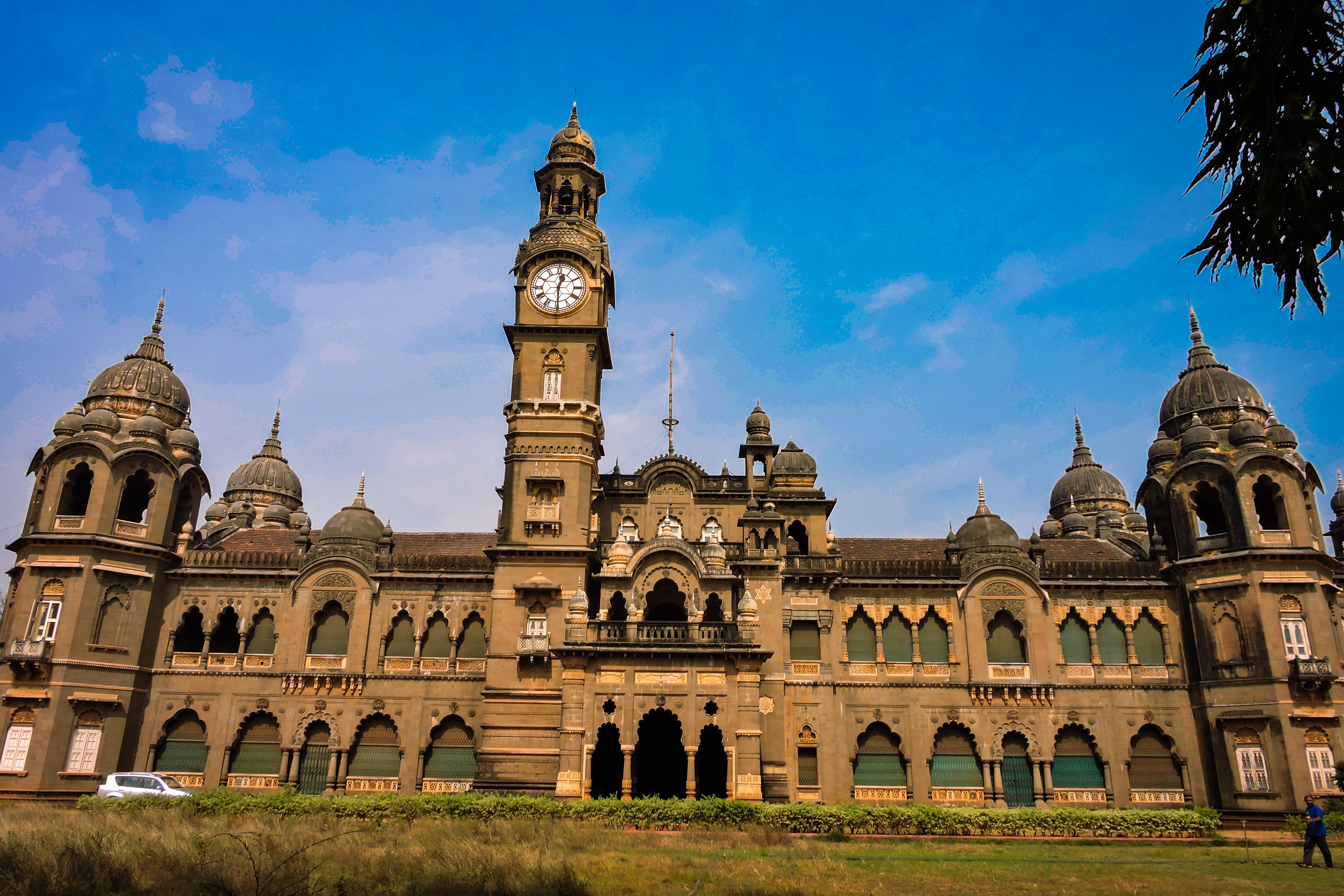
- Mahalakshmi Temple, Kolhapur National Highway-4 Jotiba temple Rankala Lake New Palace, Kolhapur
- Nickname: Karveer
- Location in Maharashtra, India Kolhapur (India)
- Coordinates: 16°41′30″N 74°14′00″E
- Country: India
- State: Maharashtra
- District: Kolhapur
- Taluka: Karveer
- Established: 904 CE
- Founder: Shilahara

Government
  - Type: Municipal Corporation
  - Body: KMC
  - Mayor: Ruparani Sangramsinh Nikam (BJP)

Area
  - City: 66.82 km^{2} (25.80 sq mi)
  - Metro: 204.12 km^{2} (78.81 sq mi)
- Elevation: 545.6 m (1,790 ft)

Population (2011)
  - City: 561,489
  - Rank: India: 80th Maharashtra: 11th
  - Density: 8,403/km^{2} (21,760/sq mi)
  - Metro: 985,736
- Demonym(s): Kolhapurkar, Kolhapuri

Official
  - Language: Marathi
- Time zone: UTC+5:30 (IST)
- PIN: 416001-10
- Telephone code: 0231
- Vehicle registration: MH-09, MH-51
- Website: kolhapur.gov.in

Kolhapur is a city on the banks of the Panchganga River in the southern part of the Indian state of Maharashtra.

Kolhapur is one of the most significant cities in South Maharashtra and has been a hub of historical, religious, and cultural activities for centuries. It is famous for its unique food culture, including its signature Kolhapuri cuisine. The city is situated in the western part of Maharashtra and is often referred to as "Dakshin Kashi" or "Mahateerth". It boasts a rich history, which has given it various other names, including Kollagiri, Kolladigiripattan, and Kollapur, all meaning "valley" Around 2 CE, Kolhapur's name was 'Kuntal'.

Kolhapur is known as 'Dakshin Kashi' or Kashi of the South because of its spiritual history and the antiquity of its shrine Mahalaxmi, better known as Ambabai. The region is known for the production of the famous handcrafted and braided leather slippers called Kolhapuri chappal, which received the Geographical Indication designation in 2019. In Hindu mythology, the city is referred to as "Karvir."

Before India became independent in 1947, Kolhapur (as Kolhapur State) was a princely state under the Bhosale Chhatrapati of the Maratha Confederacy. It is an important centre for the Marathi film industry.

== Etymology ==
Mythologically, Kolhapur is named after Kolhasur, a demon in Hindu history. According to legend, the demon Kolhasur renounced asceticism after his sons were killed by the gods for harassing people. He prayed to Mahalakshmi, requesting that she leave the area to him for a hundred years. He committed numerous crimes during this period until the goddess returned after the hundred years were over and killed him for his sins. Kolhasur's dying wish was to name the place after him, a request granted, and the area was named Kolhapur. 'Kolha' represents Kolhasur, and 'pur,' a Sanskrit word, means 'city.'

Historically, the Stone inscription from Terdal, of Shilahara kingdom, who ruled this region from 8–12 C.A.D., mention this area as 'kshullakpur' (the first stage of Jain monkhood or Junior Jain monks called as kshulakas) - as per inscription in This region most Junior monks were present during the rule of Shilaharas and Rashtrakutas it also called as Ancient Hub of Jainism and 'Kalapuri,' a city with beautifully stone carved temples. This historical information is preserved in Shilahar-era ancient Jain matha and temples near the Ambabai temple.

== History ==
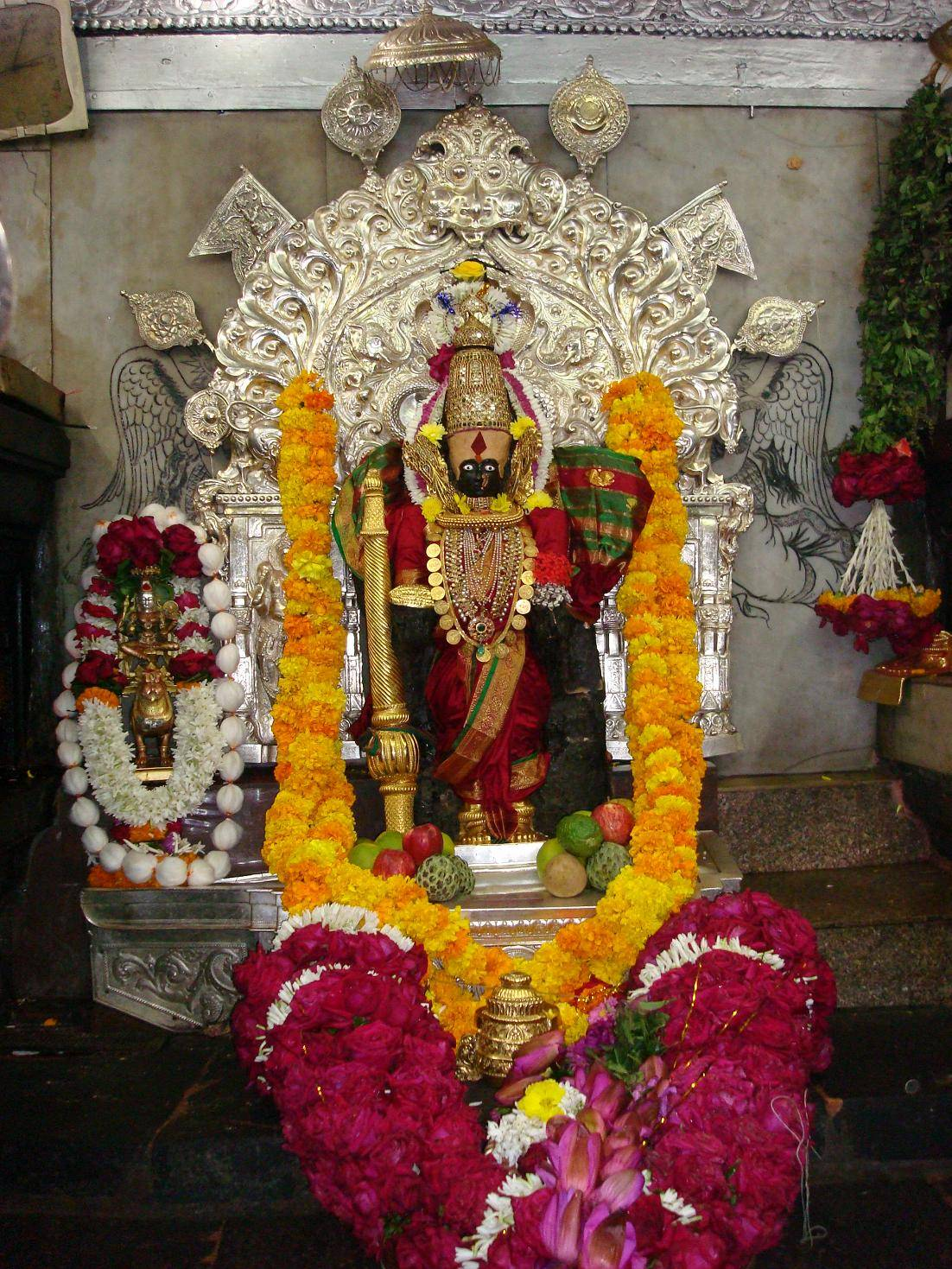
Mahalakshmi, Hindu goddess

=== Medieval era ===
The Shilahara family founded a dynasty at Kolhapur who were familial descendants of Rashtrakuta Empire, that ruled over southern Maharashtra including the modern districts of Satara, Kolhapur and Belagavi (Karnataka). Their family deity was the goddess Padmāvatī and Ambabai, whose blessing they claimed to have secured in their copperplate grants (Mahalakshmi-labdha-vara-prasada). Like their relatives of the northern branch of Konkan, the Shilaharas claimed to be of the lineage of Vidyadhara Jimutavahana, a Jain scholar. Their banner featured a golden Garuda. One of the many titles used by the Shilaharas was Tagarapuravaradhisvara, supreme sovereign ruler of Tagara.

The first capital of the Shilaharas was probably at Karad during the reign of Jatiga II, as known from their copper plate grant of Miraj and 'Vikramankadevacharita' of Bilhana. Hence, they are referred to sometimes as the 'Shilaharas of Karad'. Later, although the capital was shifted to Kolhapur, some of their grants mention Valavada and the hill fort of Pranalaka or Padmanala (Panhala) as the places of royal residence. Karhad retained its significance during the Shilahara period. This branch rose to power in the latter part of the Rashtrakuta rule and unlike the kings of the other two branches, this branch does not allude to the genealogy of the Rashtrakutas even in their early grants. They acknowledged the suzerainty of the later Chalukya dynasty for some time. They had used Kannada as an official language as can be seen from their inscriptions. The branch held southern Maharashtra from circa 940 to 1220.

From 940 to 1212 CE, Kolhapur was the centre of power of the Shilahara dynasty. An inscription at Terdal states that the king Gonka (1020 – 1050 CE) was bitten by a snake then healed by a Jain monk. Gonka then built a temple to Lord Neminath, the twenty-second Jain tirthankara (enlightened being). From this era, Jain temples in and around Kolhapur are called Gonka-Jinalaya.

Around 1055 CE, during the reign of Bhoja I (Shilahara dynasty), a dynamic Acharya (spiritual guide) named Maghanandi (Kolapuriya) founded a religious institute at the Rupanarayana Jain temple (basadi). Maghanandi is also known as Siddhanta-Chakravarti, meaning the great master of the scriptures. Kings and nobles of the Shilahara dynasty such as Gandaraditya I, who succeeded Bhoja I, were disciples of Maghanandi.

Kolhapur was the site of intense confrontation between the Western Chalukya Empire and Rajadhiraja Chola and his younger brother Rajendra Chola II of the Chola Empire. In 1052 CE, following the Battle of Koppam, the victor, Rajendra Chola II, marched on to Kolhapur and erected a jayastambha (victory pillar).

Between 1109 and 1178 CE, the Kopeshwar temple to Lord Shiva was built by Shilahara kings, Gandaraditya I, Vijayaditya, and Bhoja II in Khidrapur, Kolhapur.

=== Kolhapur State ===
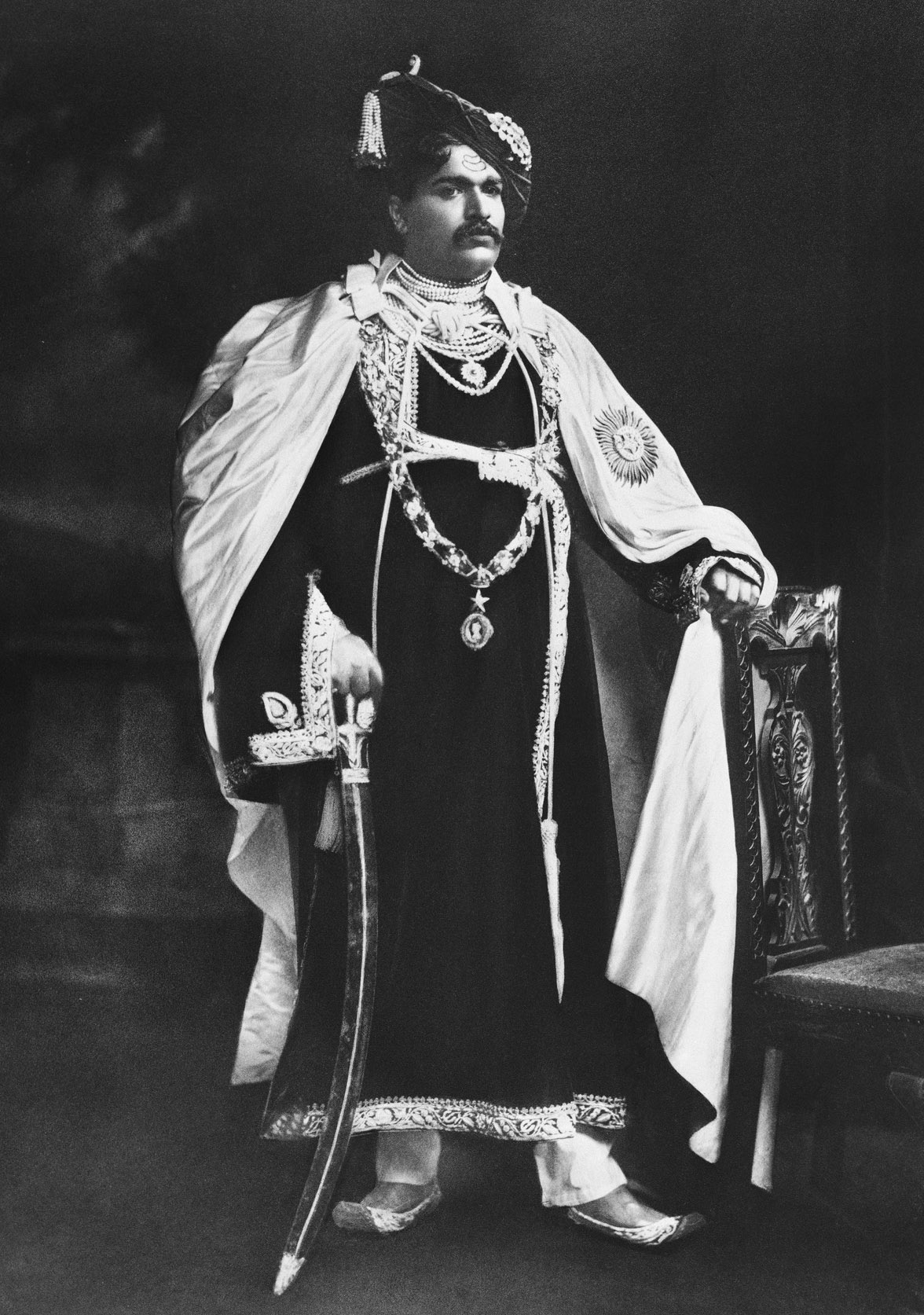
Chhatrapati Rajarshi Shahu Maharaj, Maharajah of Kolhapur

The state of Kolhapur was established by Tarabai in 1707 in the midst of a succession dispute over the Maratha crown. The Maratha throne was then occupied by descendants of Tarabai. One of the prominent Kings was Rajarshi Shahu Maharaj. In his reign, he promoted free education to people of all castes, religions and fought against untouchability. The state was annexed by the British in the 19th century. After India's independence in 1947, the Maharaja of Kolhapur acceded to the Dominion of India on 14 August 1947 and merged with Bombay State on 1 March 1949. Kolhapur is sometimes found spelled as Colapore. Often, Kolhapur is also referred as Dakshin Kashi or the Kashi of the South, due to its rich religious history.

=== Scriptural references ===
Kolhapur is mentioned in the Devi Gita, the final chapter of the Devi-Bhagavata Purana, a text of Shaktism. Kolhapur is noted as a place of Kollamma worship. In the text, Devi says,

"O King of Mountains! Still I am now telling something out of My affection to My Bhaktas. Hear. There is a great place of pilgrimage named Kollapura in the southern country. Here the Devi Ambabai always dwells."

== Geography ==
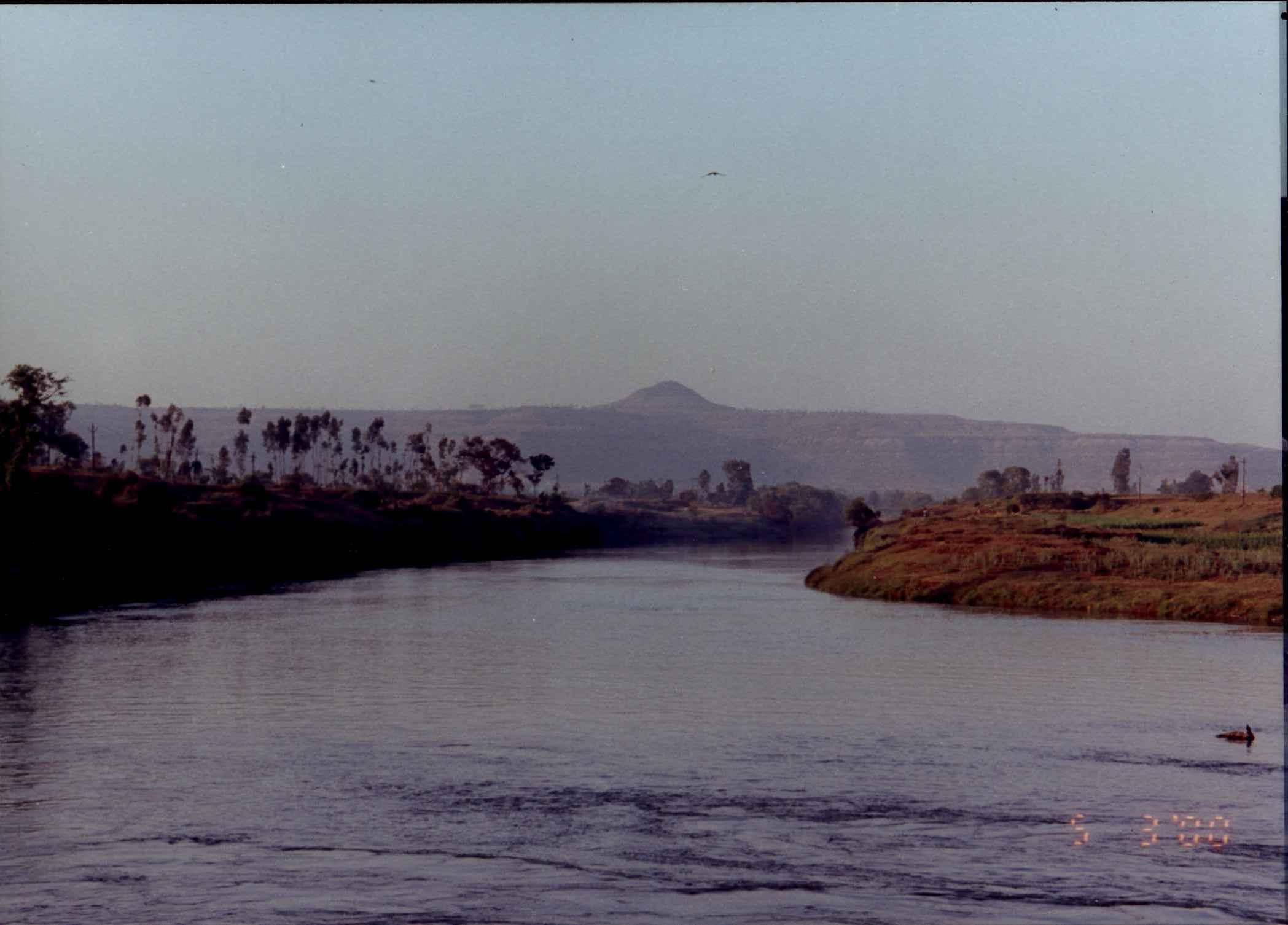
The Panchganga river at Kolhapur

Kolhapur is an inland city located in south-west Maharashtra state, 385 km (239 mi) south of Mumbai and 237 km (147 mi) south of Pune, 656 km (408 mi) north-west of Bengaluru, 539 km (335 mi) west of Hyderabad and 49 km (30 mi) west of Sangli city. Within Maharashtra, Kolhapur's nearest cities and towns are Ichalkaranji 30 km (19 mi), Jaysingpur 40 km (25 mi), Kagal 20 km (12 mi), Belgaum 114 km (71 mi). It lies in the Sahayadri mountains in the Western Ghats at an elevation of 569 m (1,867 ft). Tambraparni river dam near Umgaon village is close by, as also are Radhanagari and Kalambawadi dams. Panhala 21 km (13 mi) and Jyotiba Temple 19 km (12 mi) are in the vicinity of Kolhapur too.

=== Climate ===
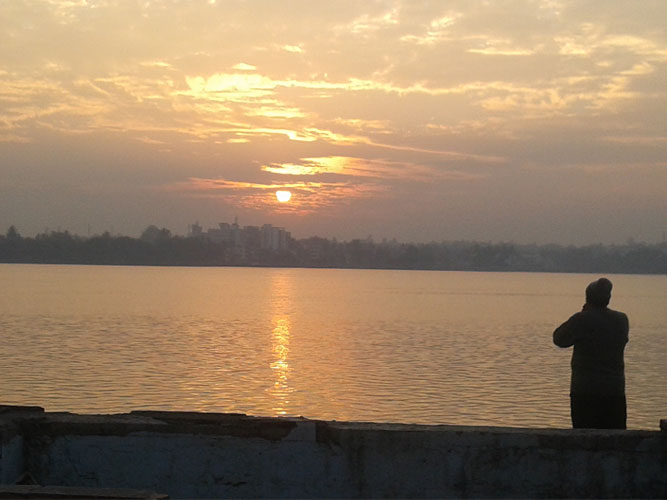
Rankala Lake at morning

Kolhapur's climate is a blend of coastal and inland elements common to Maharashtra. The temperature ranges between 10 and 35 °C (50 and 95 °F). Summer in Kolhapur is comparatively cooler, but much more humid, than neighbouring inland cities. Maximum temperatures rarely exceed 35 °C (95 °F) and typically range between 33 and 35 °C (91 and 95 °F). Lows during this season are around 24 to 26 °C (75 to 79 °F).

The city receives abundant rainfall from June to September, attributed to its proximity to the Western Ghats. These heavy rains often result in severe flooding during these months. Years such as 2005, 2006, 2019, and 2021 experienced significant floods. Temperatures are lower in the rainy season, ranging between 19 and 30 °C (66 and 86 °F).

Kolhapur experiences winter from November to February. Unlike other cities in Maharashtra, such as Pune and Nashik, its winter temperatures are relatively warmer. Lows range from 9 to 16 °C (48 to 61 °F), while highs are in the range of 24 to 32 °C (75 to 90 °F), owing to its high elevation and proximity to the Western Ghats. The low humidity during this season contributes to pleasant weather.

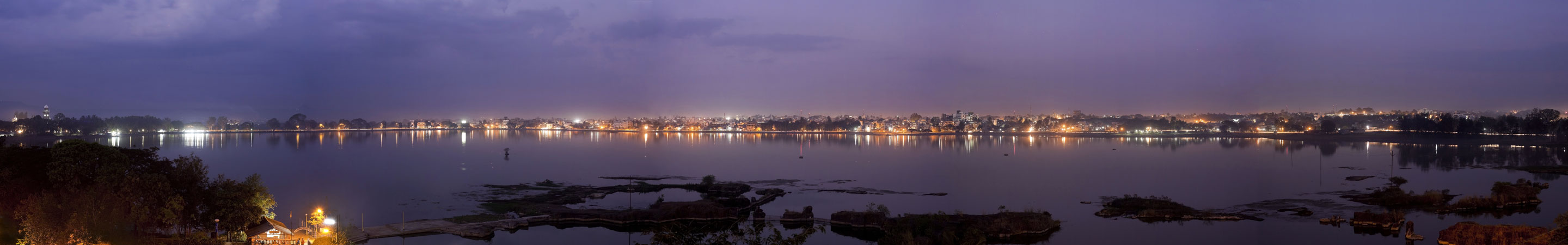
Kolhapur City at night from Rankala lake

Climate data for Kolhapur (1991–2020, extremes 1946–2020)
Month	Jan	Feb	Mar	Apr	May	Jun	Jul	Aug	Sep	Oct	Nov	Dec	Year
Record high °C (°F)	35.4 (95.7)	37.8 (100.0)	40.4 (104.7)	41.7 (107.1)	42.3 (108.1)	40.0 (104.0)	33.3 (91.9)	32.2 (90.0)	35.7 (96.3)	36.5 (97.7)	34.6 (94.3)	35.0 (95.0)	42.3 (108.1)
Mean daily maximum °C (°F)	30.2 (86.4)	32.6 (90.7)	35.5 (95.9)	36.8 (98.2)	35.5 (95.9)	30.1 (86.2)	26.9 (80.4)	26.7 (80.1)	28.7 (83.7)	30.7 (87.3)	30.6 (87.1)	29.8 (85.6)	31.2 (88.2)
Mean daily minimum °C (°F)	15.5 (59.9)	17.0 (62.6)	20.1 (68.2)	22.1 (71.8)	22.7 (72.9)	22.2 (72.0)	21.5 (70.7)	21.1 (70.0)	20.8 (69.4)	20.6 (69.1)	18.4 (65.1)	15.8 (60.4)	19.9 (67.8)
Record low °C (°F)	8.7 (47.7)	8.8 (47.8)	12.4 (54.3)	13.8 (56.8)	16.2 (61.2)	17.6 (63.7)	18.1 (64.6)	18.0 (64.4)	16.4 (61.5)	13.9 (57.0)	9.6 (49.3)	8.6 (47.5)	8.6 (47.5)
Average rainfall mm (inches)	0.4 (0.02)	0.7 (0.03)	6.6 (0.26)	19.9 (0.78)	37.1 (1.46)	214.1 (8.43)	296.5 (11.67)	227.9 (8.97)	133.9 (5.27)	118.5 (4.67)	19.2 (0.76)	2.8 (0.11)	1,077.5 (42.42)
Average rainy days	0.0	0.1	0.5	1.5	2.6	11.6	18.3	16.7	8.9	6.6	1.5	0.2	68.4
Average relative humidity (%) (at 17:30 IST)	39	32	32	40	51	75	84	84	76	62	49	44	56
Source: India Meteorological Department

Kolhapur has been ranked 28th best “National Clean Air City” under (Category 2 3-10L Population cities) in India.

=== Hydrology ===
The Panchganga River originates in the Western Ghats. It has five tributaries which supply the city and surroundings – the Bhogavati, Tulsi, Kumbhi, Kasari and Dhamani rivers. Kolhapur has a number of lakes. The Rankala Lake was once a stone quarry.

The Kalamba lake was built in 1873. These two lakes provide the city with domestic potable water.

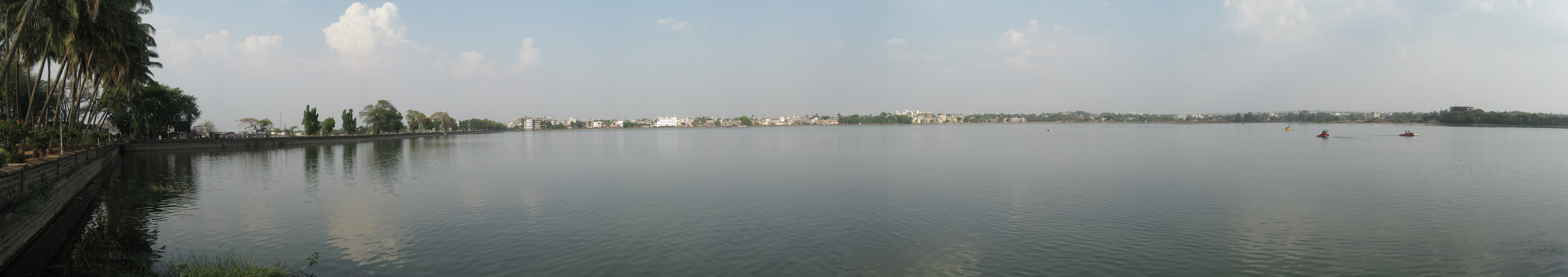
Rankala lake panorama

== Governance ==
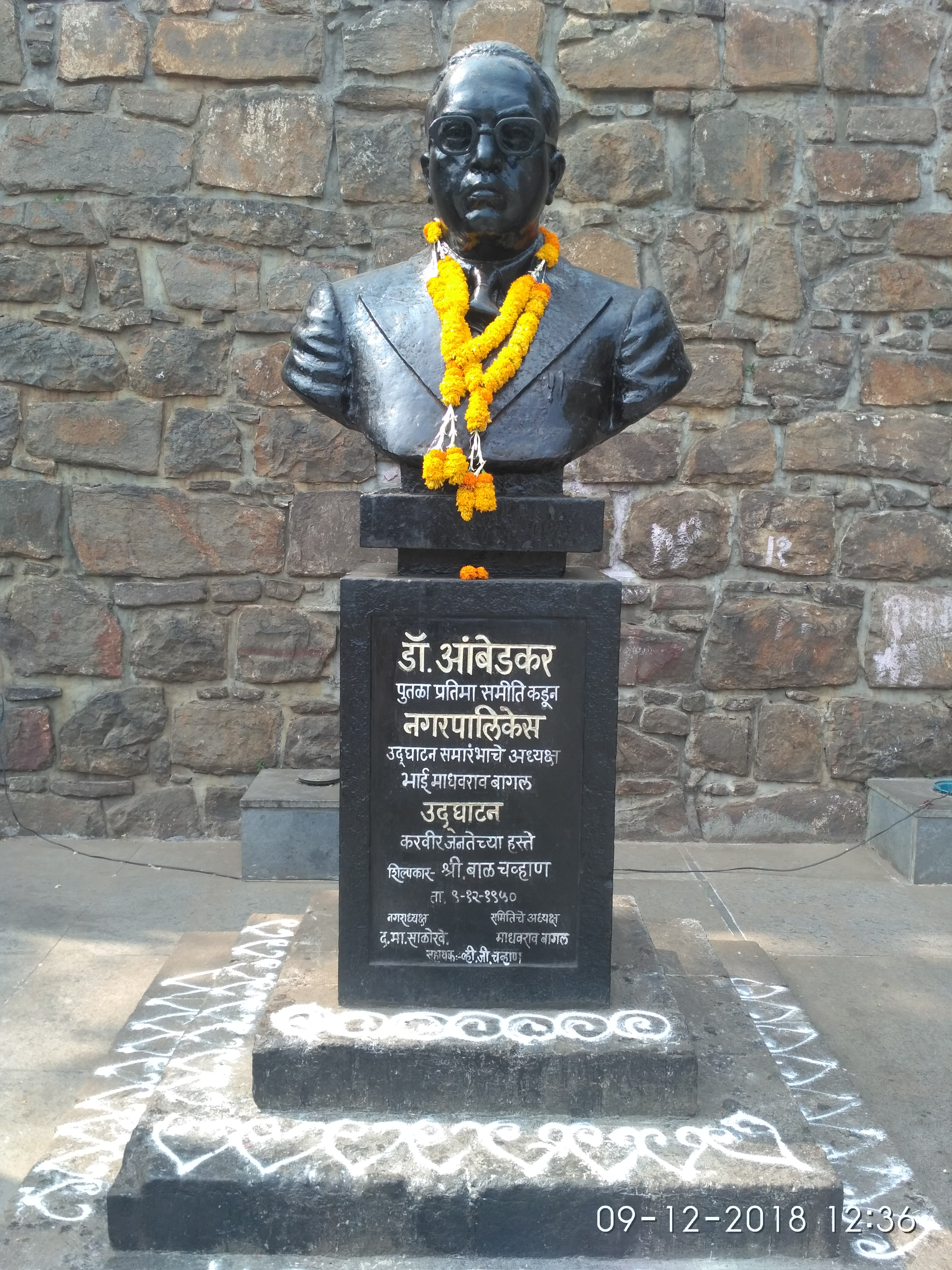
The world's first statue of B. R. Ambedkar, a bust erected in 1950 at Bindu Chowk in Kolhapur.

Kolhapur is governed by the Kolhapur Municipal Corporation (KMC). The city is divided into five wards, named with the letters A to E. The corporation provides services such as sewage treatment and free cremation for residents and has made a number of improvements, for example, the Kolhapur Road Project, the Anti-Encroachment Drive to stop illegal building activity encroaching on the city's open spaces, and the Suvarna Jayanti Nagarotthan Project to improve roads and storm water management. The KMC faces problems like the civic limits of Kolhapur city which have not expanded since 1972, due to which the city cannot benefit from various government schemes.

The Kolhapur Municipal and Regional Development Authority was established on 16 August 2017. This authority to manage Kolhapur city and 42 villages around it was formed for the balanced development of Kolhapur city and the neighbouring villages.

=== Municipal finance ===
According to financial data published on the CityFinance Portal of the Ministry of Housing and Urban Affairs, the Kolhapur Municipal Corporation reported total revenue receipts of ₹495 crore (US$59 million) and total expenditure of ₹574 crore (US$69 million) in 2022–23. Tax revenue accounted for about 32.1% of the total revenue, while the corporation received ₹194 crore in grants during the financial year.

== Demographics ==
Religion in Kolhapur City (2011)
Religion	Percent
Hinduism	83.89%
Islam	10.88%
Jainism	3.35%
Christianity	0.95%
Buddhism	0.53%
Other or not stated	0.40%

As per the 2011 census of India, the population of Kolhapur city is 549,236 and that in 'Kolhapur Municipal and Regional Development Authority' is 561,837. Kolhapur has one of the highest Human Development Index ratings among Indian districts, at 0.770 in 2011. The most common religion in Kolhapur is Hinduism.

Languages of Kolhapur City (2011)
1. Marathi (83.7%)
2. Hindi (8.30%)
3. Urdu (2.49%)
4. Kannada (1.39%)
5. Gujarati (1.08%)
6. Others (3.04%)

== Economy ==
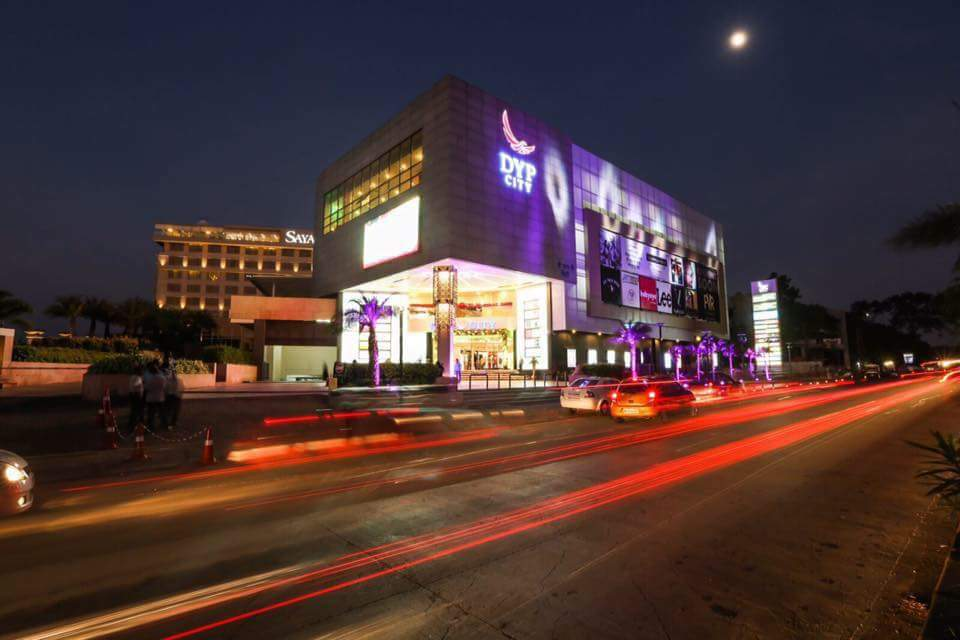
DYP City Mall, Kolhapur

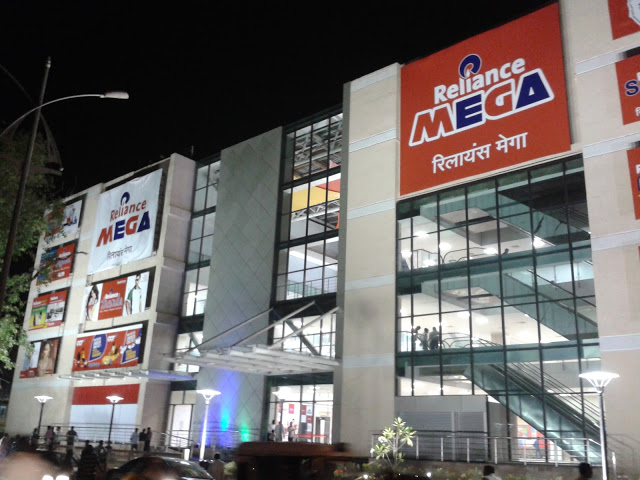
Reliance Mega mall at Kolhapur

Kolhapur has a higher per capita domestic product than the state's average. It has auto-ancillary, foundry and casting industrial establishments which act as supporting units for industries in Sangli, Satara, Pune and Bangalore.

Kolhapur is also an industrial city with approximately 300 foundries generating exports with a value of 15 billion rupees per year. A manufacturing plant of Kirloskar group Kirloskar Oil Engines Limited [KOEL] is set up in the MIDC at Kagal near Kolhapur, as is the Raymond clothes plant. Kolhapur has two more industrial areas, Gokul-Shirgaon MIDC and Shiroli MIDC. Shivaji Udyamnagar is an industrial area in the city with a rich entrepreneurial tradition of more than 100 years and specializing in oil engines.

The city is the home of Kolhapuri chappal, a handcrafted buffalo leather slipper that is locally tanned using vegetable dyes. Kolhapuri slippers are sold on Mahadwar road. Other handicrafts include hand block printing of textiles, silver, bead and paste jewellery crafting, pottery, wood carving and lacquerware, brass sheet work and oxidised silver artwork, and lace and embroidery making.

Kolhapuri jewellery includes a type of necklace called Kolhapuri saaj, patlya (two broad bangles), chinchpeti (choker), tanmani (short necklace), nath (nose ring), and bajuband (an amulet).

Considering the economic activity, Kolhapur has a large Income Tax office, which collects substantial revenue for the Government of India.

== Tourism ==
The Bombay Gazetteer recorded almost 250 temples in the region of which 6 – Ambabai, Temblai, Vithoba, Mahakali, Phiranga and Yallamma temples – are considered the most prominent. Tourism is an important source of revenue with about three million annual visitors. Kolhapur's attractions include:

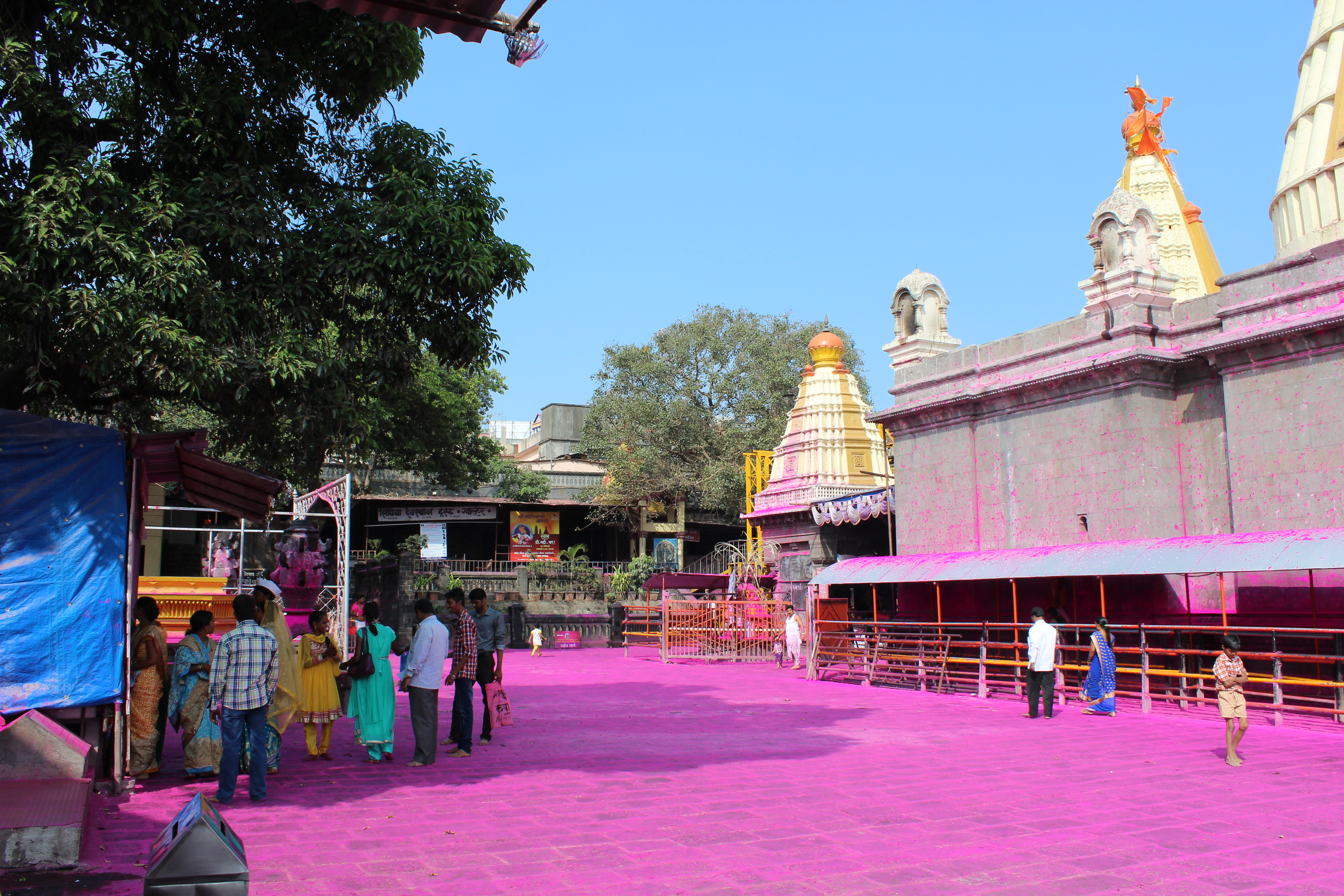
Jyotiba Temple, Kolhapur

- Mahalakshmi Temple, Kolhapur
- Jyotiba Temple
- Panhala Fort
- Kaneri Math
- New Palace
- Temblai temple complex
- Rankala Lake
- The Tara Rani equestrian statue
- An 85 feet (26 m) idol of the Lord Ganesh at the Chinmaya Mission (Top-Sambhapur).

The Kolhapur Maybach car of the chhatrapatis of Kolhapur is displayed to the public during the annual Dusshera procession.

=== Film industry ===
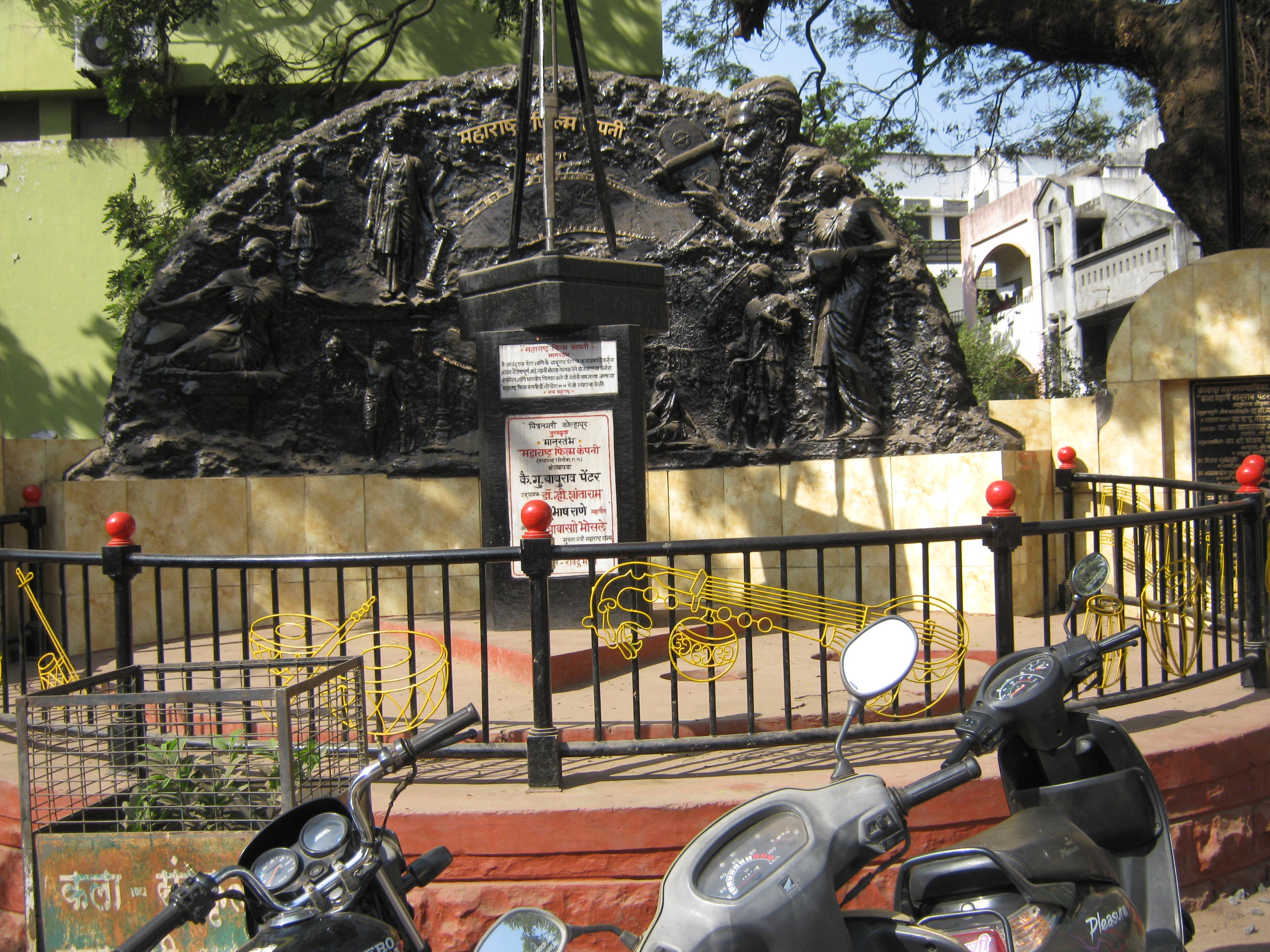
A Memorial to Baburao Painter in Kolhapur

On 1 December 1917, the Maharashtra Film Company was established in Kolhapur by Baburao Painter. The city has become the primary centre for the Marathi film industry. Kolhapur plays host to many film festivals, including the Kolhapur International Film Festival. The Kolhapur film city was renovated in 2017.

== Cuisine ==
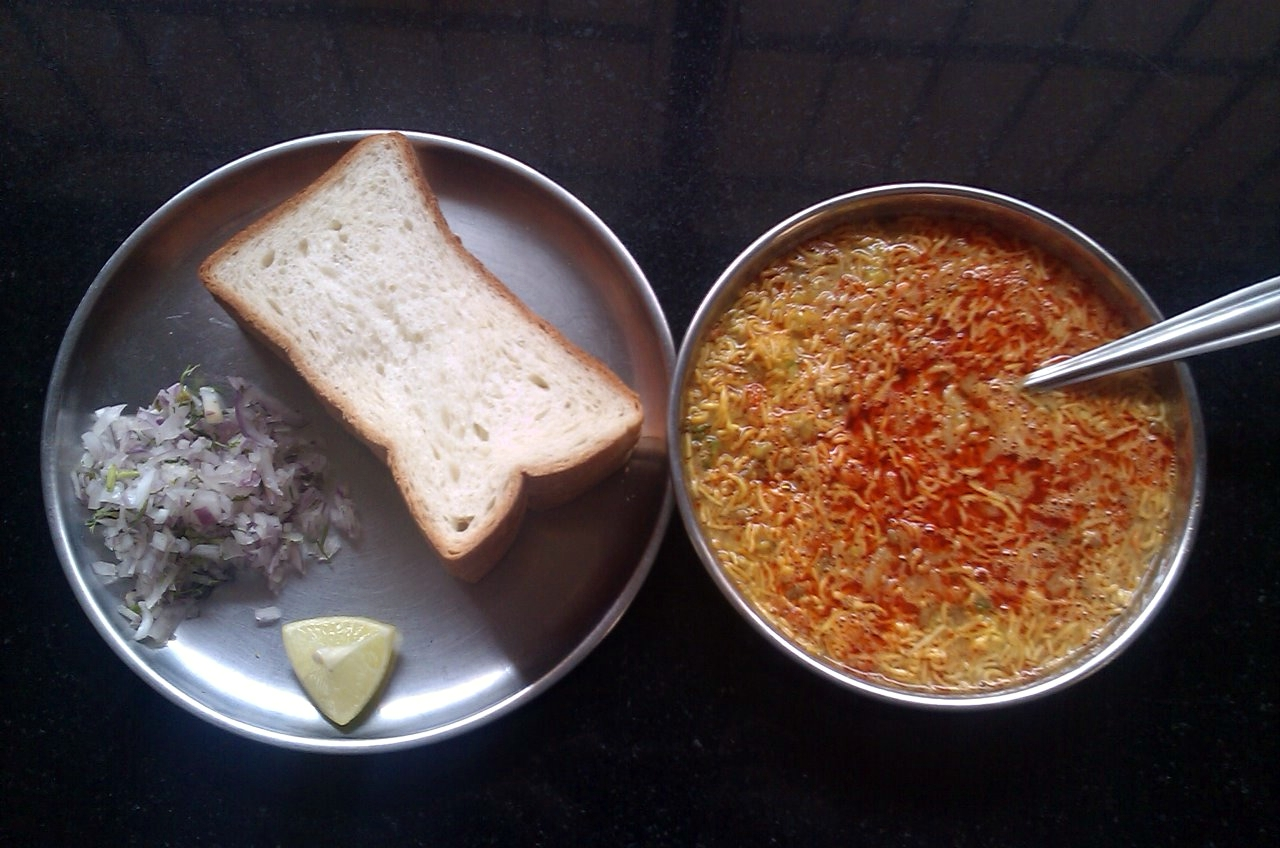
Kolhapuri Misal

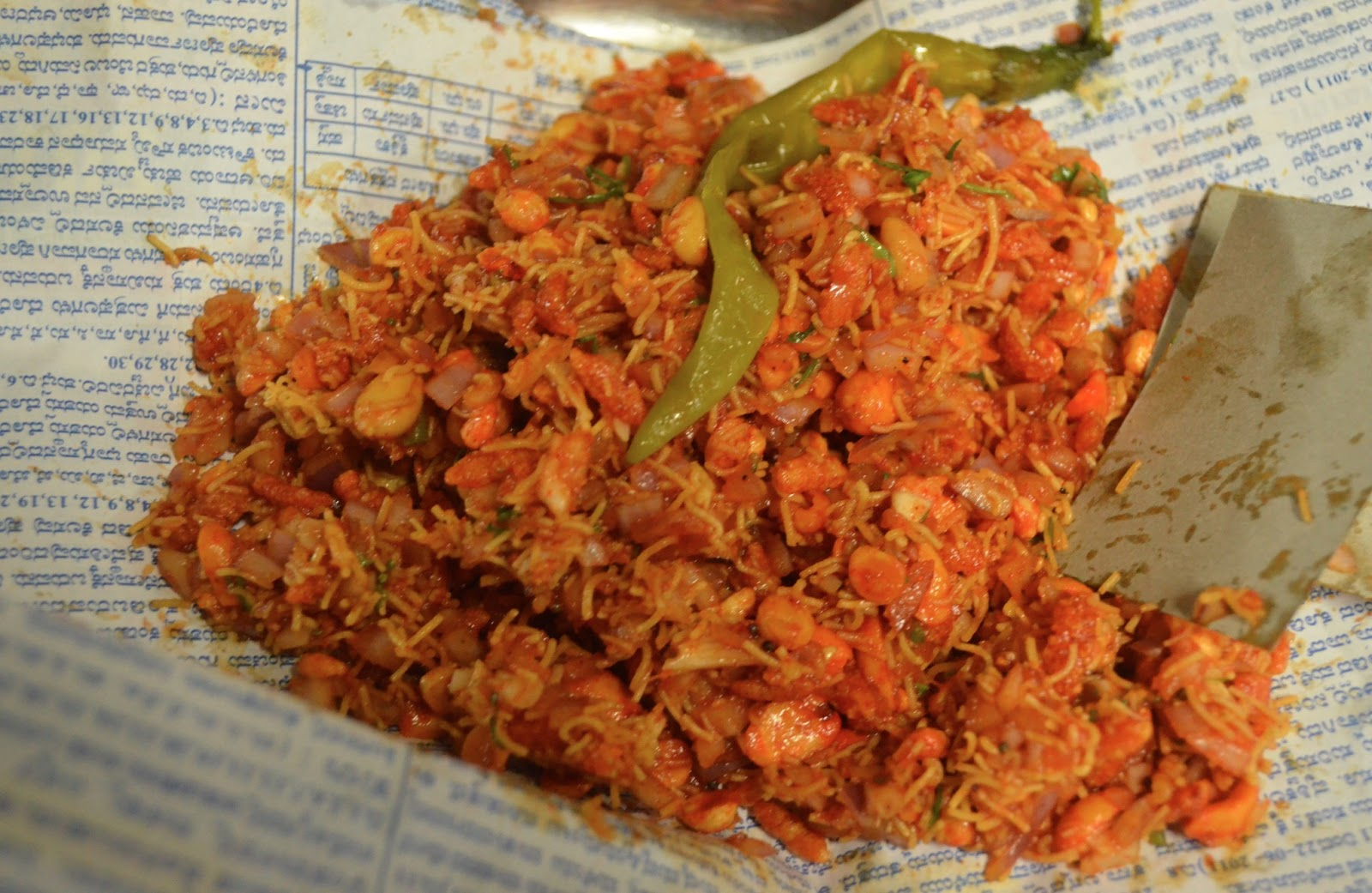
Kolhapuri Bhel

Kolhapur cuisine includes mutton dishes, Kolhapuri misal, and ethnic meat dishes. The city also lends its name to certain types of food and ingredients, such as Kolhapuri lavangi (chili peppers), Kolhapuri jaggery (cane juice concentrate), Kolhapuri masala (spice mixture) and Kolhapuri chutney (onion garlic chutney) which is a staple in gravies and curries.

Kolhapur cuisine also includes soup-like curries called Pandhara Rassa and Tambda Rassa which are served as a part of a Thali. Pandhara Rassa, which can be loosely translated as white curry, is a soup-like dish made from mutton stock and coconut milk infused with spices like cinnamon, coriander, ginger, and garlic. It is served as an appetizer, and also as a part of the main course. Tambda Rassa, red curry, is a spicier form of the dish made by substituting coconut milk with red chillies.

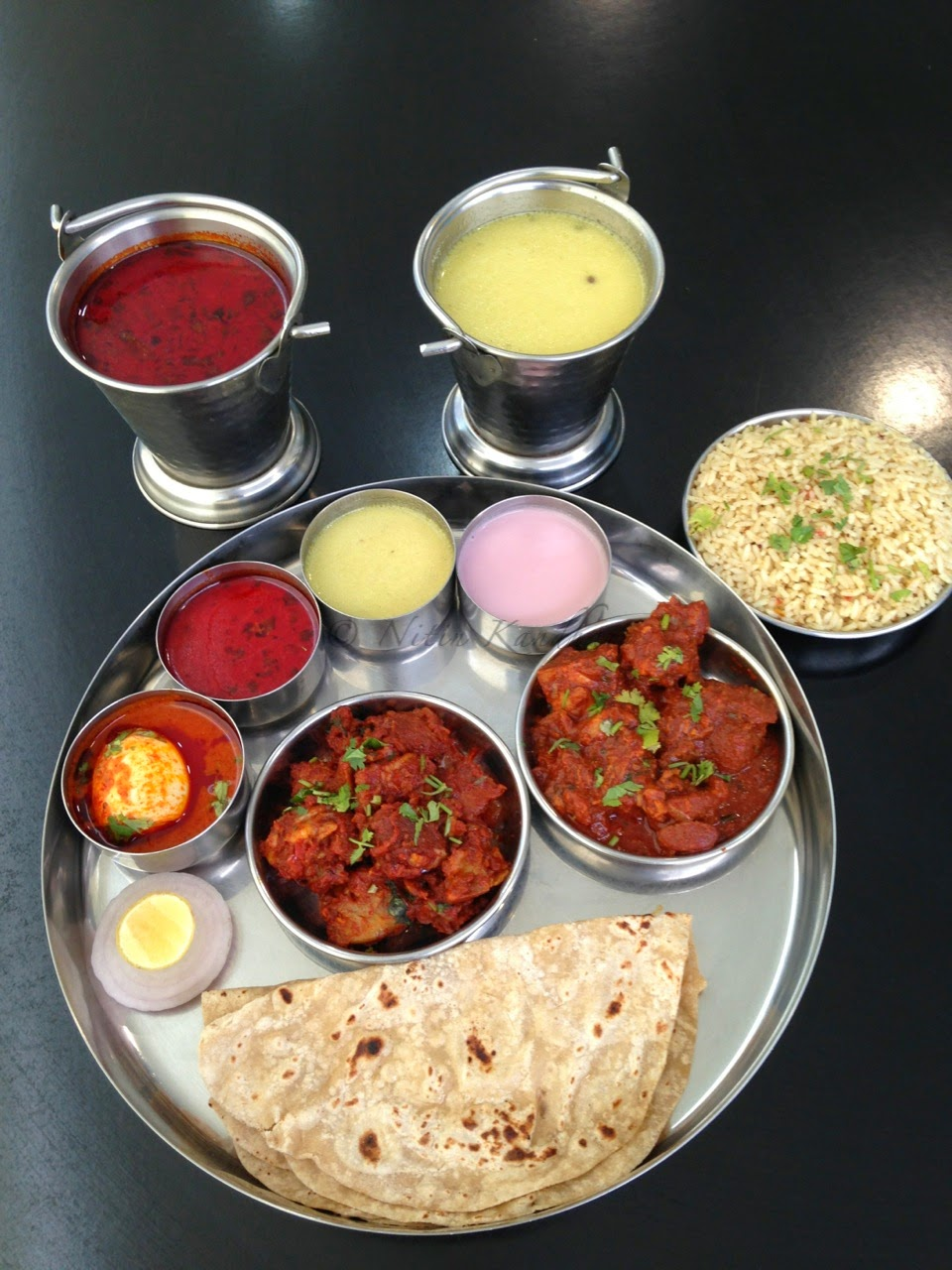
Kolhapuri Mutton plate with Tambada and Pandhara Rassa (outside the plate).

== Media and telecommunication ==
Kolhapur's main newspaper is the Pudhari. Other Marathi language newspapers include Sakal, Loksatta, Lokmat, Kesari, Saamna, Tarun Bharat, and Punyanagari.

The English language dailies include The Times of India (Kolhapur edition), The Indian Express, Business Standard and The Economic Times.

Kolhapur's FM radio services include Tomato FM (94.3 MHz), Radio Mirchi (98.3 MHz), Radio City (95 MHz), Big FM (92.7 MHz) and All India Radio FM (102.7 MHz).

== Sports ==
Wrestling (known as Kushti in Hindi/Marathi), football and kabaddi are the sports most played in the city.

Chhatrapati Shahu Stadium is known as wrestling capital of India. Kolhapur has a long history of kushti (wrestling) and has produced many wrestlers. The sport flourished during the reign of Shahu of Kolhapur (1894–1922). During this golden age, he built Akharas or Taleems (as they are colloquially called) all over Kolhapur and organized wrestling tournaments, inviting wrestlers from across the Indian sub-continent. Since then, Kolhapur's wrestling culture has been dominated by various Taleems like Gangavesh taleem, Shahupuri taleem, Motibag taleem, etc. More than 70 wrestlers undertake training in each of these.

India's first individual Olympian Khashaba Dadasaheb Jadhav, India's first Hind Kesari Shripati Khanchnale and Rustam-e-Hind Dadu Chougule belonged to Kolhapur.

Chhatrapati Shahu Stadium is a football stadium in Kolhapur. Khasbag Wrestling Stadium, India's largest wrestling stadium is situated in Kolhapur. B.B. Nimbalkar (former Ranji cricketer), Suhas Khamkar (Mr. Asia, Winner), Virdhawal Khade (Indian Olympian in swimming), Tejaswini Sawant (Arjuna awardee, world championship gold medalist shooter), Rahi Sarnobat (Arjuna awardee, Asian Gold medalist in shooting), Rucha Pujari (chess – Woman International Master), Shahu Mane also belong to the city. Aniket Jadhav who played the FIFA U-17 World Cup 2017 is from Kolhapur.

== Transport ==
=== Railway ===
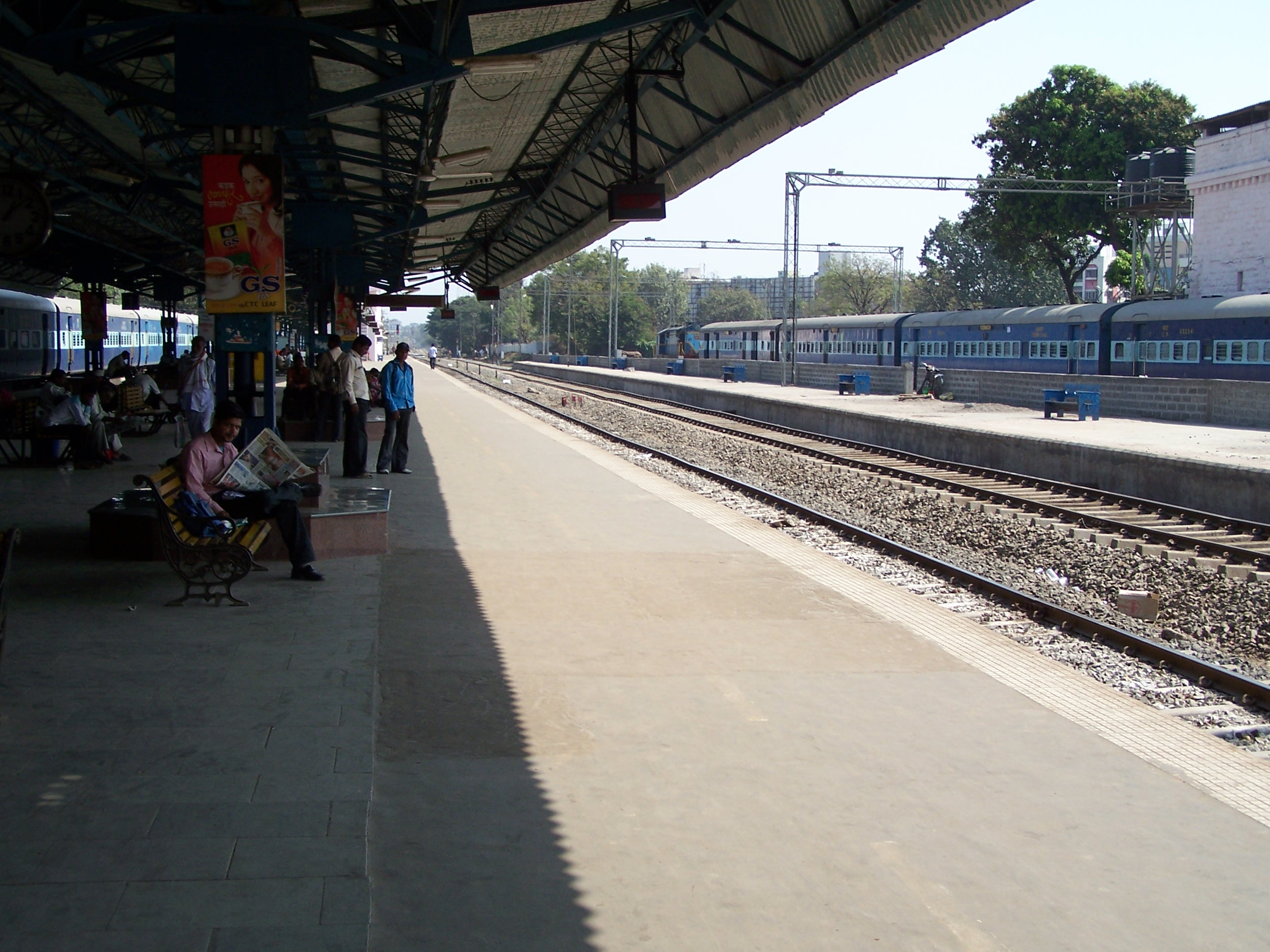
Kolhapur railway station

The Chhatrapati Shahu Maharaj Terminus links Kolhapur via rail to India's major cities with express services to Miraj, Sangli, Pune, Mumbai, Bengaluru and New Delhi. A daily shuttle service connects Kolhapur with the main rail hub of Miraj on the Central Railway main line. A daily DEMU local train also runs from Kolhapur to Sangli railway station. A new railway route from Miraj via Kolhapur until Vaibhavwadi has been confirmed, which will connect Kolhapur and many other towns with to the Western coastal region of India.

=== Road ===
Kolhapur is located on National Highway 4 and National Highway 204. Kolhapur is 55 km from Sangli City and 200 km from Pune. The city has three state transport bus stands: Central Bus Stand (CBS), Rankala Bus Stand and Sambhajinagar Bus Stand. Kolhapur Municipal Transport (KMT) provides local bus services. The CBS of Kolhapur is the busiest bus stand in western Maharashtra with more than 50,000 commutators a day.

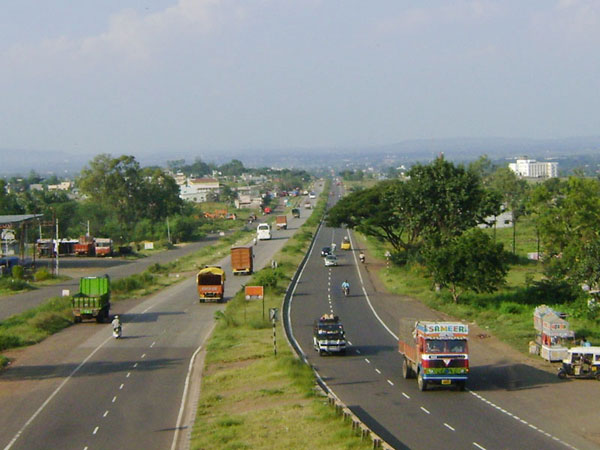
NH 4, (Now NH 48) near the city

=== Airport ===
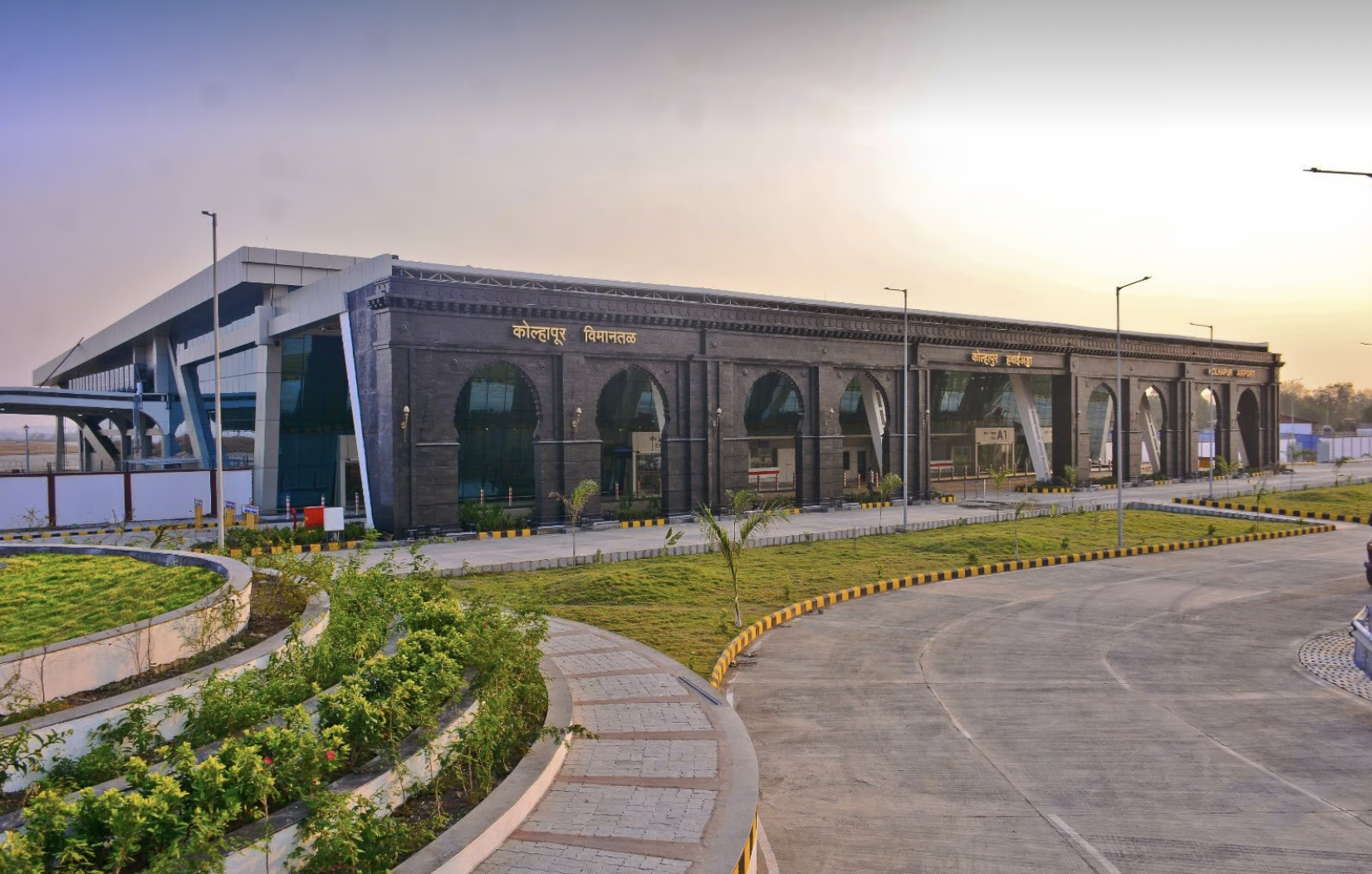
New Terminal at Kolhapur Airport

Kolhapur's domestic airport, also known as Chhatrapati Rajaram Maharaj Airport, is located 9 kilometres (5.6 mi) south east of the city at Ujalaiwadi.

Indigo operates daily flights to Hyderabad Airport and Tirupati Airport as well as three times a week to Ahmedabad Airport. Star Air operates flights three times in a week to Mumbai Airport. Expansion of runway and construction of airport terminal building is in progress.

The nearest international airports to Kolhapur are Pune International Airport (240 km [150 mi]) and Goa International Airport (220 km [140 mi]).

== Education ==
Kolhapur has educational institutions for engineering, medicine, management studies, pharmaceutical sciences and agriculture. Shivaji University is located in Kolhapur city.

== Kolhapur Jaggery ==
The Kolhapur jaggery is a variety of jaggery made from fresh sugarcane juice in Kolhapur. It is manufactured from sugarcane which is a common and widely cultivated crop in Kolhapur. The waters of the streams forming the Panchganga river are primarily used for sugarcane cultivation in Kolhapur.

=== Name ===
Kolhapur jaggery made from sugarcane is a prized crop in Kolhapur and so named after it. It is known as 'Kolhapuri Gul (कोल्हापुरी गूळ)' — Gul means jaggery in the local state language of Marathi.

=== Geographical indication ===
It was awarded the Geographical Indication (GI) status tag from the Geographical Indications Registry under the Union Government of India on 31/03/2014 (valid until 30/7/2031).

Kolhapur Agricultural Produce Market (Kolhapur Sheti Utpanna Bazar Samiti) from Kolhapur, proposed the GI registration of Kolhapur jaggery. After filing the application in January 2012, the jaggery was granted the GI tag in 2021 by the Geographical Indication Registry in Chennai, making the name "Kolhapur jaggery" exclusive to the Jaggery manufactured in the region. It thus became the first jaggery variety from Maharashtra and the ninth type of goods from Maharashtra to earn the GI tag.

== Notable people ==
- Ramchandra Pant Amatya – one of the Ashta Pradhans of Shivaji
- Bhanu Athaiya – Indian costume designer and painter
- Madhavrao Bagal – writer, artist, journalist, social reformer, political activist, orator and a freedom fighter
- Sanjivani Bhelande – playback singer born in Kolhapur
- Sangram Chougule – body builder, Mr Universe winner (2012), Mr India (6-time winner), Mr Maharashtra (5-time winner)
- Ramesh Deo – Indian film and television actor
- Ranjit Desai – Marathi writer
- Suniti Ashok Deshpande – Indian educator, writer, translator and interpreter
- Vasantrao Ghatge – Indian entrepreneur, business magnate, industrialist and a professor
- Santaji Ghorpade – Maratha warrior and Sarsenapati
- Ashutosh Gowariker – Indian film director, actor, screenwriter and producer
- K. D. Jadhav – (1926–1984) was an Indian freestyle wrestler and Olympic bronze medallist
- Suhas Khamkar – body builder
- Jagdish Khebudkar – Marathi littérateur and lyricist of Marathi cinema
- Padmini Kolhapure – film actress
- Dhondutai Kulkarni – Indian classical singer from the Jaipur-Atrauli gharana
- Swapnil Kusale – (b 1995) sport shooter and Olympic bronze medallist
- Dhananjay Mahadik – Indian politician and former Member of Parliament
- Sadashivrao Dadoba Mandlik – former Member of Parliament and NCP leader
- Sanjay Mandlik – Member of Parliament and Shiv Sena Leader
- Anant Mane – film director
- Leena Nair – CEO of Chanel
- Nanda – film actress
- Jayant Narlikar – Indian astrophysicist
- B. B. Nimbalkar – Indian cricketer, best known for his score of 443 not out during the 1948–49 Ranji Trophy
- Chandrakant Patil – Indian politician and Maharashtra BJP president
- D. Y. Patil – Indian politician and educator
- Satej Patil – politician and Minister of State for home in the Maharashtra Government
- Bhalji Pendharkar – director
- Sudhir Phadke – singer and composer
- Shruti Sadolikar – Indian classical singer of the khyal style in the Jaipur-Atrauli gharana
- Arun Sarnaik – actor and singer
- Shivaji Sawant – Indian novelist
- Shahu of Kolhapur – Maharaja and a social reformer
- V. Shantaram – Indian filmmaker, film producer and actor
- Tarabai – Maratha queen and warrior
- Govindrao Tembe – music composer
- S. P. P. Thorat – Lieutenant general in the Indian Army
- Master Vinayak – Indian actor and film director
- Suresh Wadkar – playback singer

== See also ==
- Marathi people
- List of Maratha dynasties and states
- Notable people from Kolhapur
