= Tarun Bharat =

Marathi language newspaper in western India

- Type: Daily newspaper
- Format: Broadsheet
- Owner(s): Tarun Bharat Daily Pvt Ltd.
- Publisher: Tarun Bharat Daily Pvt Ltd.
- Editor-in-chief: Ankush Gorad
- Founded: 1919; 106 years ago
- Language: Marathi
- Headquarters: Belagavi, Karnataka
- Website: www.tarunbharat.com
- Free online archives: epaper.tarunbharat.com

Tarun Bharat ("Young India") is a Marathi newspaper based in Belagavi, India. It is the seventh-largest-selling Marathi daily newspaper in the country. The paper has eight editions from locations in North Karnataka (Belagavi), Southern Maharashtra (Kolhapur, Sangli, Satara), Konkan (Sindhudurg and Ratnagiri), Mumbai and Goa.

Baburao Thakur founded the newspaper 1919 during the British colonial era. The Current Editor is Kiran B. Thakur and the Executive Director is Prasad K. Thakur.

== Supplementary magazines ==
- Khazana (Wednesday)
- Mukta (Friday) a Supplement for women
- Champion (Saturday) a Supplement for Children
- Aksharyatra (Sunday)
- Gharkul (Sunday only for Belgaum edition) Supplement on property
- Diwali Magazine

== See also ==
- List of Marathi-language newspapers
- List of newspapers in India
