= Mahalakshmi Temple, Kolhapur =

Indian temple in Kolhapur

Ambabai Temple of Mahalaxmi
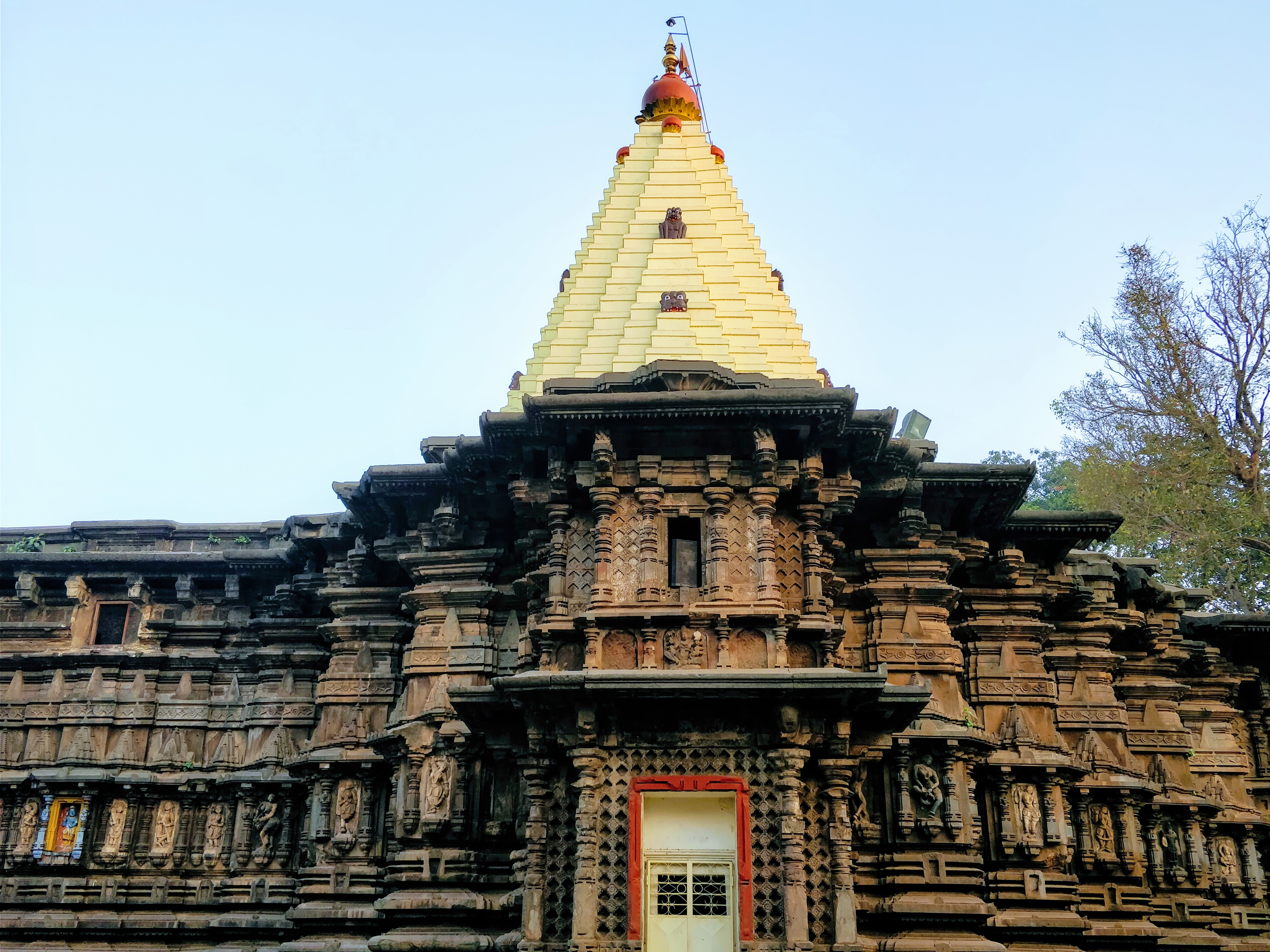

- Location in Maharashtra

Religion
- Affiliation: Hinduism
- District: Kolhapur
- Deity: Mahalakshmi
- Festivals: Kirnotsav; Rathotsav; Lakshmi Puja; Diwali; Varalakshmi Vratam; Lalita Panchami; Navratri; Margshirsha Guruvar
- Governing body: Paschim Maharashtra Devasthan Samiti

Location
- Location: Bhavani Mandap, Mahadwar Road, Kolhapur
- State: Maharashtra
- Country: India
- Coordinates: 16°42′00″N 74°14′00″E

Architecture
- Style: Hemadpanti architecture
- Creator: Karnadeva, Chalukya Empire
- Completed: 7th century CE

Website
- www.mahalaxmikolhapur.com

Mahalakshmi Temple (also known as Ambabai Mandir) is dedicated to Goddess Mahalakshmi. According to Hinduism, Goddess Mahalakshmi is the consort of Maha Vishnu and it is customary among Hindus to visit Tirumala Venkateswara Temple, Kolhapur Mahalakshmi Temple and Padmavathi Temple as a yatra (pilgrimage). It is believed by Hindus that visiting these temples as a pilgrimage helps achieve moksha (salvation). It is also believed by Hindus that Mahalakshmi had appeared here to kill demon Kolhasur. It is considered one of the three and a half Shaktipeetha's in the Shakta tradition.

== History ==
The temple was built by the Chalukya king Karnadeva in 634 CE.

Based on the claims made by twelfth century Kannada poet Brahmashiva in his writings, historian Paul Dundas states that the temple was originally a Jain temple dedicated to the eighth Tirthankar, Chandraprabh Bhagwan, and was later converted into a Hindu shrine for Goddess Mahalakshmi during religious tensions in the medieval era.

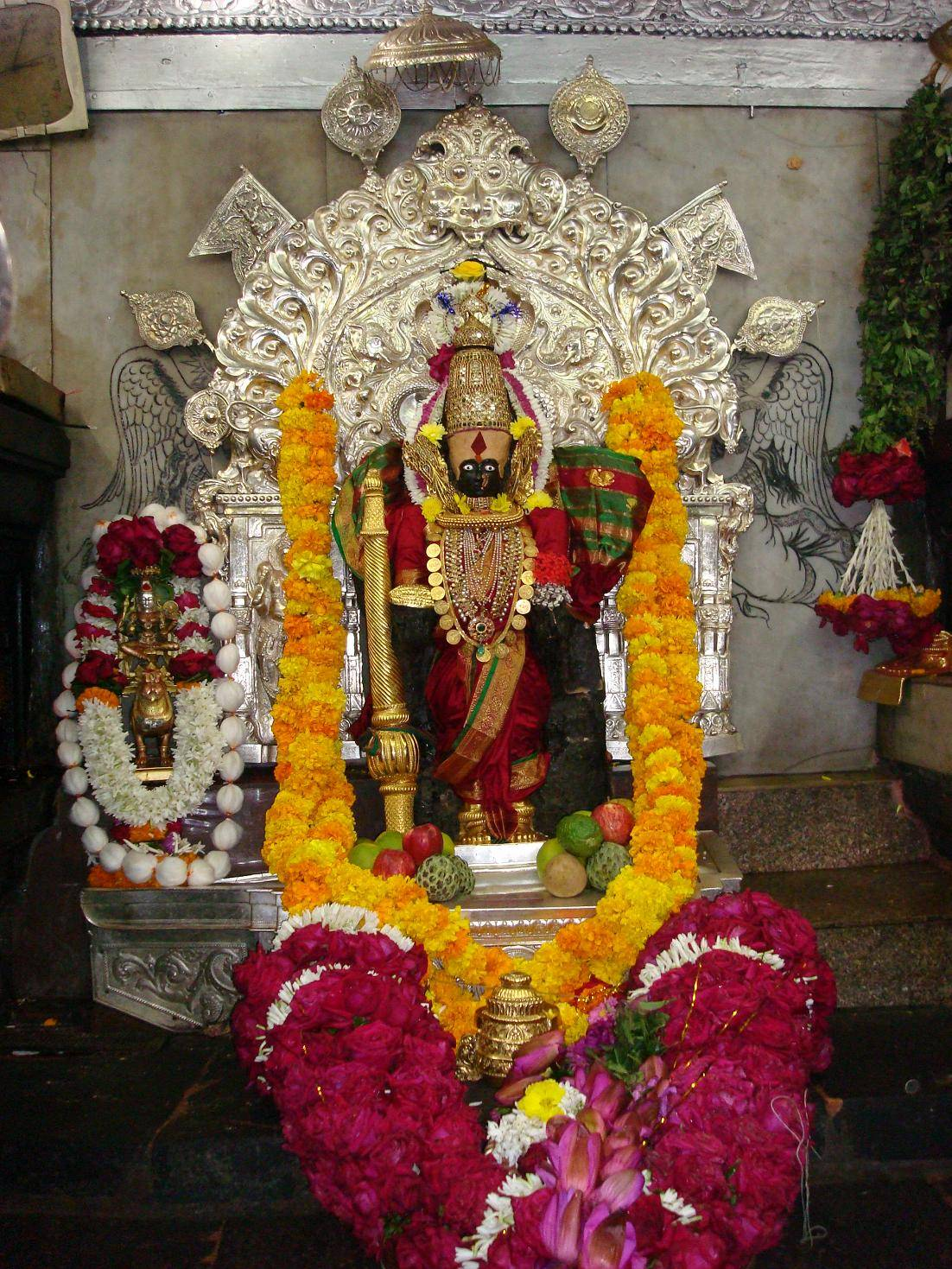
The central icon of the goddess

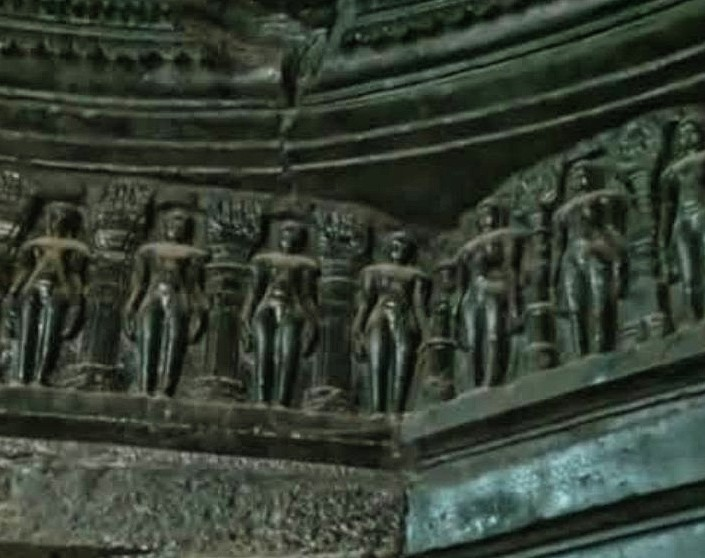
Idols of Jain Tirthankars in Kayotsarg meditation posture carved on walls of inner sanctum of temple

== Description ==
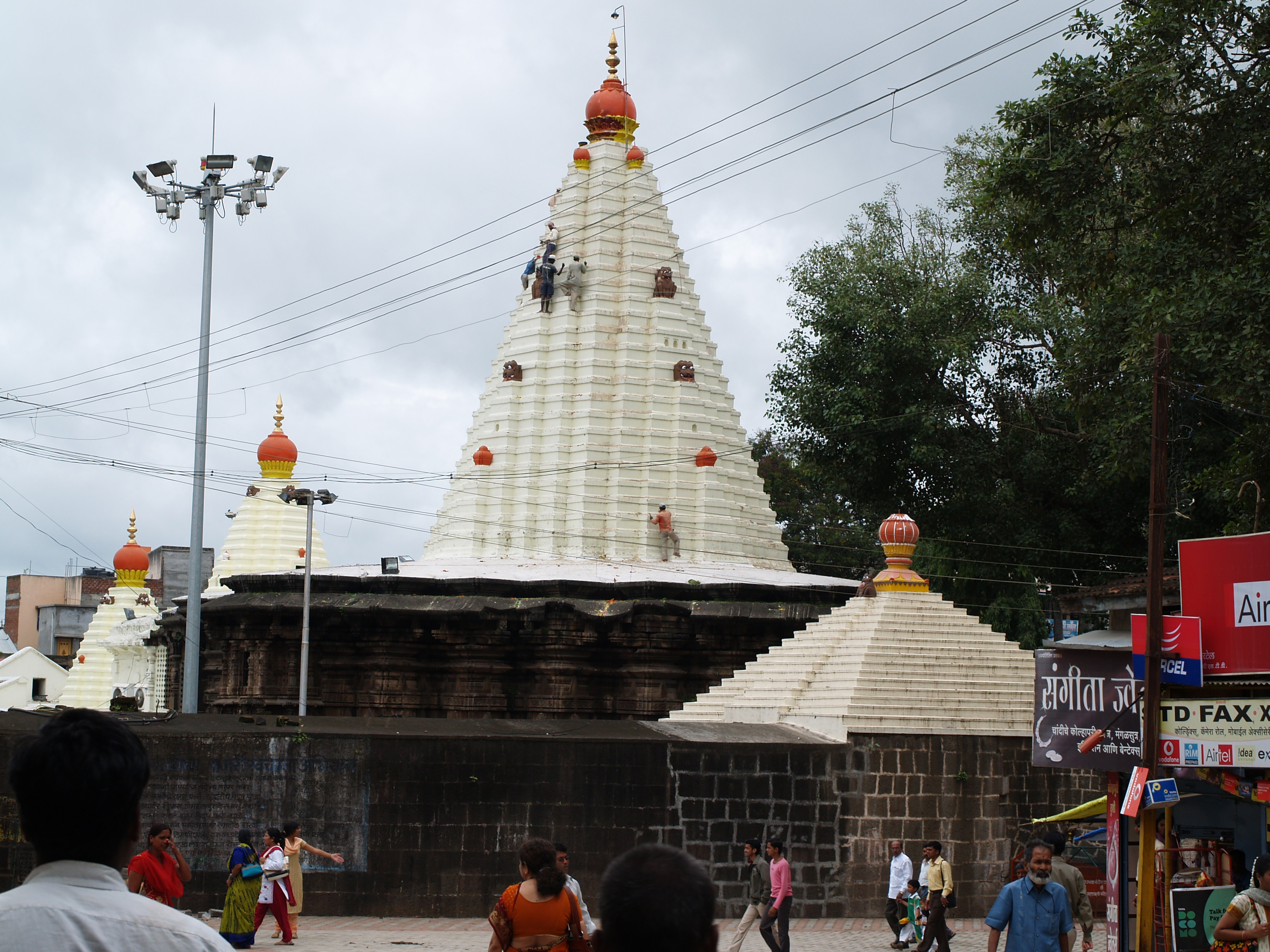
Shri Mahalakshmi Temple, Kolhapur.

Mounted on a stone platform, the murti of the crowned goddess is made of gemstone and weighs about 40 kilograms. The image of Mahalakshmi carved in black stone is 3 feet in height. The Shri Yantra is carved on one of the walls in the temple. A stone lion (the vahana of the goddess), stands behind the statue. The crown contains a five headed snake. Furthermore, she holds a Matulinga fruit, mace, shield and a pānapātra (drinking bowl). Professor Prabhakar Malshe says, "The name of Karaveera is still locally used to denote the city of Kolhapur".
