= Uttur, Kolhapur =

Uttur
- Town
- Location in Maharashtra, India
- Coordinates: 16.23°N 74.26°E
- Country: India
- State: Maharashtra
- District: Kolhapur

Government
  - Body: Gram Panchayat
- Elevation: 680 m (2,230 ft)

Population (2011)
  - Total: 7,828

Languages
  - Official: Marathi
- Time zone: UTC+5:30 (IST)
- PIN: 416220
- ISO 3166 code: IN-MH
- Website: maharashtra.gov.in

Uttur is a town located in the southern part of Kolhapur District of Maharashtra. It is part of Ajara Tehsil. Uttur is also known for Saturday Weekly market place in Panchkroshi.

PIN Code 416220.

Offices

1. Grampanchayat
2. Talathi office
3. Post office
4. BSNL Office

== See also ==
- Kadgaon
- Nesari
- Mahagaon, Gadhinglaj
- Harali
- Mugruwadi
- Halkarni
- Gadhinglaj Taluka
- State Highway 134 (Maharashtra)
