= State Highway 134 (Maharashtra) =

Road in Maharashtra, India

State Highway 134

Route information
- Maintained by MSRDC
- Length: 110 km (68 mi)

Major junctions
- East end: Sankeshwar, Kolhapur
- National Highway 4 at Sankeshwar; National Highway 17 at Sawantvadi
- West end: Sawantvadi, Sindhudurg

Location
- Country: India
- State: Maharashtra
- Districts: Kolhapur, Sindhudurg
- Primary destinations: Sankeshwar-Gadhinglaj-Kadgaon-Ajra-Amboli-Sawantvadi

Highway system
- Roads in India; Expressways; National; State; Asian; State Highways in Maharashtra

Maharashtra State Highway 134, commonly referred to as MH SH 134, is a normal state highway that runs south through Kolhapur district and Sindhudurg district in the state of Maharashtra, India. This state highway touches the cities of Sankeshwar-Gadhinglaj-Kadgaon-Ajra-Amboli and then proceeds from Maharashtra-Karnataka state border from East-West towards Sawantvadi in Sindhudurg. It covers a distance of over 110 km.

MH SH 134 is a two lane highway normally, but in Gadhinglaj municipal limits this is a six lane highway. This makes it a 20 km, six lane highway in Gadhinglaj, and rest the rest is a 90 km, two lane highway.

== Summary ==
In Kolhapur district and Sindhudurg district this highway is also known as Sankeshwar-Gadhinglaj-Kadgaon-Ajra-Amboli-Sawantvadi Road.This road emanates from National Highway 4 at Sankeshwar. Its total length in the Kolhapur district and Sindhudurg district is 110 kilometres. The road runs towards east towards west up to National Highway 17 at Sawantvadi. The road passes through Gadhinglaj Taluka, Ajra Taluka and Swantvadi Taluka. The road-surface up to Sankeshwar-Gadhinglaj-Kadgaon-Ajra-Amboli-Sawantvadi is black-topped and is motorable throughout the year except for some interruptions during heavy rains. The entire length of the road up is black-topped. The road is motorable throughout the year.

MH SH 134 is a two lane highway normally, but in Gadhinglaj municipal limits this is a six lane highway. This makes it a 20 km, six lane highway in Gadhinglaj, and rest the rest is a 90 km, two lane highway.

== Route description ==
Below is the brief summary of the route followed by this state highway.

== Major junctions ==
The following roads either emanate from it or are crossed by it.

=== National highways ===
- National Highway 4 at Sankeshwar
- National Highway 17 at Sawantvadi

== See also ==
- List of state highways in Maharashtra
