= Gadhinglaj =

City in Maharashtra, India

- City
- Nicknames: Hinglaj, Smart City Gadhinglaj
- Location in Maharashtra, India
- Coordinates: 16.23°N 74.35°E
- Country: India
- State: Maharashtra
- District: Kolhapur
- Established: 1500
- Named for: Fort

Government
  - Type: Municipal Council
  - Body: Gadhinglaj Municipal Council
- Elevation: 623 m (2,044 ft)

Population
  - Total: 50,000
- Demonym: Gadhinglajkar

Language
  - Official: Marathi
- Time zone: UTC+5:30 (IST)
- PIN: 416502
- Telephone code: 02327
- Vehicle registration: MH-09

Gadhinglaj ([ɡəɖᵊɦiŋɡləd͡z]) is a city in India in the Kolhapur district in the southwest corner of the state of Maharashtra, India. It is located on the banks of the river Hiranyakeshi. It is the Taluka (Tehsil) headquarters of Gadhinglaj Taluka and a subdivision headquarters of the Gadhinglaj Subdivision of the Kolhapur District. It is governed by a municipal council. The rapidly growing city is the third largest in the Kolhapur District, with population of more than 50,000. Places to visit include Samagad fort, temples and beautiful weather.

== Geography ==
Gadhinglaj is situated on the banks of the Hiranyakeshi river, which originates in the Amboli Ghats mountains. It is located at the border between Maharashtra and Karnataka. Maharashtra State Highway 134 passes through the city. Gadinglaj is the headquarters of South Kolhapur and a sub-district of the Kolhapur District. It is the largest city in South Kolhapur and has enough area and population to be deemed a district. The city is at an average elevation of 623 metres (2,044 ft).

== History ==
Although the exact date of Gadhinglaj's founding is unknown, ancient texts date the city back to at least 1500 AD. Gadhinglaj was originally a small village near the banks of the Hiranyakeshi River. It was not until 1887, when the Gadhinglaj Municipal Council was formed, that it grew into a town. At that time the official name of the city was Hinglaj. During the 1960s and 1970s, the town expanded into a city and its local government grew correspondingly from a C-class municipal council to B-class municipal council. During the 1970s, Appasaheb Nalawade founded the Gadhinglaj Sugar Factory, which contributed to the city's industrial and agricultural growth. Since 2000, the city has seen a population and economic boom, with its population nearly tripling. It has become one of fastest growing cities in Maharashtra and India. During this time Gadhinglaj also saw a boom in its trade, business, financial, and real estate sectors.

== Demographics ==
As of the 2001 Indian census, Gadhinglaj had a population of 27,185. However, the city and its surrounding areas has since increased to 80,000. Males constitute 51 percent of the population.

Gadhinglaj has an average literacy rate of 80.91 percent, which is higher than the national average of 74.9 percent, with male literacy at 87.51 percent and female literacy at 74.5 percent. The dominant and most widely spoken language is Marathi. However, Kannada is also spoken due to the city's proximity to Karnataka.

== Religion ==
The population of Gadhinglaj is mainly Hindu, with Islam as the largest minority religion. There are also Buddhists, Christians (Bardeskars), Sikhs, and others living in the city.

== Culture ==
The main festivals of Gadhinglaj include the Hindu festivals of Diwali, Ganesh Chaturthi, Vijayadashami, Navaratri and Holi (Festival of Colours).

== Civic Administration ==
The civic administration of the city is managed by the Gadhinglaj nagar palika. It is among the wealthiest municipal councils of its classification in the country. It was founded on 1 August 1887, and oversees construction, health, sanitation, water supply, administration, and taxation in the city. Gadhinglaj is divided into 15 wards: Uparate Galli, Belgudri Colony, Bazaar Peth, Gune Path, Gandhinagar, Ayodhya Nagar, Magdum Colony, Manglewadi, Gaurav Nagar, Kaju Baug, Sadhana Nagar, Yamunanagar, KDCC Bank Colony, Gurukul Nagar, Gijawanenagar, Bhadagaonnagar, and Hiranyakeshinagar.

Gadhinglaj operates its own fire department, the Gadhinglaj Municipal Fire Brigade, which operates a fire engine, tanker truck, ambulance, support vehicle, and hydraulic platform truck. Gadhinglaj Municipality (GMC) is headed by a municipal president who is assisted by a municipal chief officer and council members. The city's electrical supply is managed by the Maharashtra State Electricity Distribution Company Limited (MAHADISCOM). It maintains paved roads and civil facilities through tax revenues collected from various economic sectors.

In 2008, Gadhinglaj was one of the first talukas in India to initiate energy conservation programmes through utilizing solar energy for its street lights.

== Economy ==
Gadhinglaj's major businesses are trade, sugar production, and red chili production. Thanks to its proximity to Goa and Sindhudurg, it serves as a market hub. MIDC is developing heavy and light industry in the area. The trade sector of the city's economy is booming and eclipsed sugarcane and jaggery production as the city's biggest economic segment in 2000. Real estate is another prosperous sector in Gadhinglaj due to the city's booming trading and industrial sectors, ideal location and climate, developed infrastructure, and abundant electricity and water supply. These qualities have led to heavy investment in the city's real estate by outsiders, mainly from Kolhapur, Satara, Pune, Mumbai, and Nagpur.

Gadhinglaj's agricultural sector is known for sugarcane, red chili, jaggery, food grains, and vegetables. Some parts of Sindhudurg district and Goa state heavily rely on Gadhinglaj for food grains and vegetables. Gadhinglaj has also been a major hub for cattle trading for many years. There are sugar mills situated 6 kilometres (3.7 mi) from the city. Textiles are also a major business in Gadhinglaj due to its proximity to textile-producing regions. The city is also known for its production of kolhapuri chappal (hand-crafted leather slippers).

Many banks have a strong presence in Gadhinglaj city and the Gadhinglaj Taluka due to its large-scale trading sectors and its textile and agricultural industries. Gadhinglaj features major banks including ICICI Bank, Bank of Maharashtra, State Bank of India, Union Bank of India, Bank of Baroda, Bank of India, Federal Bank, Axis Bank, HDFC bank, Indian Overseas Bank, IDBI bank, and various local banks.

== MIDC ==
The Maharashtra Industrial Development Corporation Industrial Area is situated 75 kilometres (47 mi) south of Kolhapur and Kolhapur Airport, near Gadhinglaj. This industrial area is well connected by road, rail, and air transport to almost all Indian cities. The nearest railway station is 45 kilometres (28 mi) away, in Belgaum. The area is located on the Sankeshwar-Ajara-Sawantwadi state highway and is 15 kilometres (9.3 mi) from National Highway 4. The Karnataka state boundary is just 10 kilometres (6.2 mi) from this area. The port and airport at Panjim (Goa) are 150 kilometres (93 mi) away.

The area has a separate sub-station and an uninterrupted power supply. MIDC has plans for a water supply scheme that would source 3.00 MLD of water from the Gijawane K.T., the main source of which is the Chitri dam on the Hiranyakeshi River. The Grinex company pledged an investment of Rs 320 crores (US$60 million) in a production plant for the manufacturing of fibre pipes for the water supply. Many other small-scale and mid-scale industries have started or pledged to start production in the Gadhinglaj MIDC (GMIDC).

== Gandhinagar ==
Gandhinagar is a planned, upper-class closed development of Gadhinglaj. When it was built in 1980, it became the first planned community in Gadhinglaj. It mainly consists of bungalows and high-rise housing societies. It includes high-class schools and hotels, as well as many other amenities such as a park, gym, community hospital, swimming pool, and community hall. It is governed by the Gandinagar Housing Society Corporation (GHSC).

== Expansion of Gadhinglaj City Municipal Limit ==
In 2010, it was rumoured that the nagar palika of Gadhinglaj City was in process of expanding municipal limits by 10 kilometres (6.2 mi) towards Mahagaon. This would result in a very large increase in both area and population, with population increasing to 150,000. It would transform the Gadhinglaj Nagar Parished into a 'Class A' Nagar Palika, which would enable it to operate its own municipal public transportation system, among other services. This would improve Gadhinglaj's status as an economic hub in Kolhapur and South Maharashtra.

In 2019, the area limits of Gadhinglaj city were expanded. The surrounding area of Badyachiwadi gram panchayat is now included in the limits of Gadhinglaj city.

== Education ==
The literacy rate in Gadhinglaj city is 89.36%, which is higher than the state average of 82.34%. In Gadhinglaj, the male literacy is around 93.74% while female literacy rate is 85.03%. Gadhinglaj includes some of the most reputable educational institutions in India, and it serves as an educational hub in Maharashtra and India as a whole. Some of Gadhinglaj's educational institutions include:

- Sarvodaya Vivek Jeevan Vidya Public School
- Omkar Education Society's Arts, Commerce and Science College, Gadhinglaj
- D. K. Shinde College of Education (B.Ed.) Gadhinglaj
- Late Kedari Redekar Public School
- Chhatrapati Shivaji Vidyalaya
- Creative Pre-Primary School
- Creative Primary School
- Creative High School
- Creative Jr. College Of Science
- Barrister Nath Pai Vidyalaya
- V.D. Shinde High School
- Gadhinglaj High school and Jr College
- Sadhana High School and College
- Lotus English School Gadhinglaj
- Jagruti High School and Jr. College
- Sadhana Vidyalaya,
- Dr. Ghali College
- M.R. High School and Jr College
- Sant Gajanan Maharaj Rural Polytechnic College
- Sant Gajanan Maharaj College Of Engineering
- Sant Gajanan Maharaj College of Pharmacy and Medical
- Kedari Redekar Ayurvedic College
- E.B. Gadkari Homeopathy College
- Dr. A. D. Shinde Institute of Technology
- Neora High School
- Kalu Mastar Vidyalaya
- Sai international School
- New horizon School

== Tourist attractions in Gadhinglaj ==
- Amboli, Sindhudurg
- Sawant Fort, Smart city Gadhinglaj
- Shree Somlingeshwar Temple, Madhyal (6 km)
- Jotiba Temple, Kadgaon (4 km away)
- Kalbhairav Temple
- Mahalaxmi Temple
- St. Anthony Church, Church Road Gadhinglaj
- Shri. Chaloba Temple Kadal (12 km Away)
- Ramling Temple, Virbhadra Temple, Laxmi Temple, Hanumaan Temple, and others around the town of Halkarni
- The Samangad Fort, which belongs to the seventh Rasrakuta king Dantidurga or Dantivarma II, bears date sak 675 (A.D. 733-54)
- River Hiranyakeshi
- Pargad (The hill Fort) around 75 km
- Kasturba garden
- Tilak garden
- Rajarshi Shahu garden
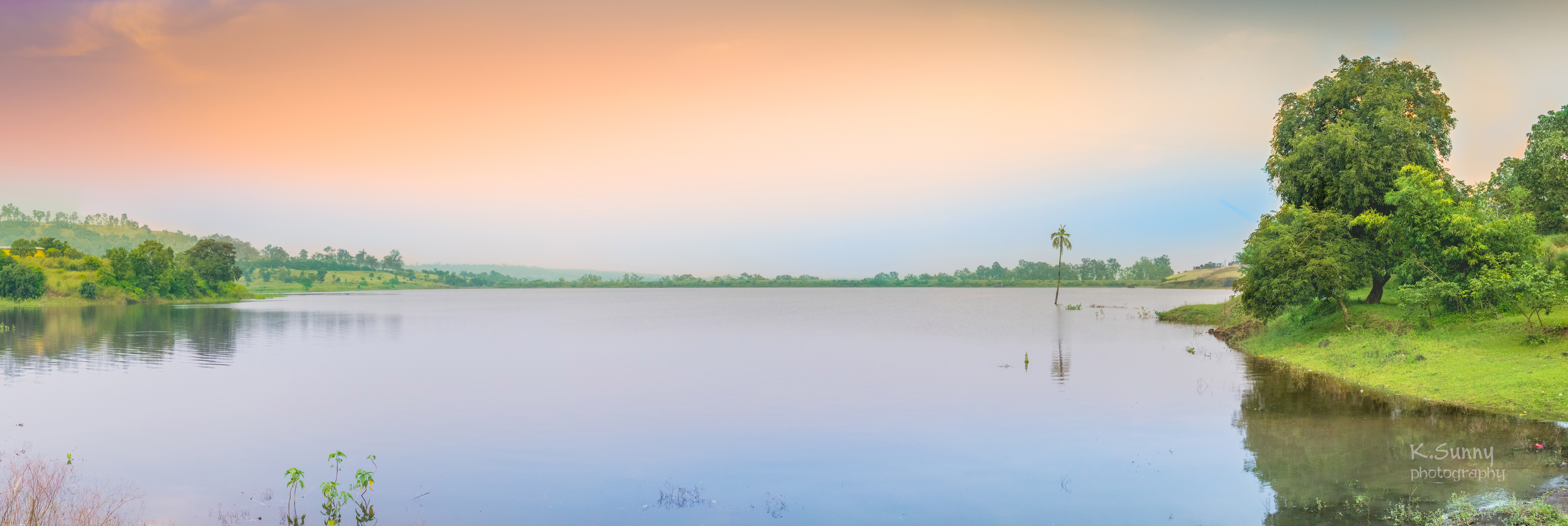
  Shendri Lake
  Shendri lake
- Nakshatra Garden
- Chitri Dam (near Ajra)
- Laxmi Temple, Basarge
- Kalavati Devi temple (Hari mandir), Chidambarnagar
- Guddai Temple, Bhadgaon
- Pant Maharaj Mandir, Mugali
- Sai Temple, Lokamany tilak Udyan
- Shri Kalleshwar Devasthan, Bhadgaon
- Shri Guddadevi Mandir, Bhadgaon
- Shri Kedarling Mandir, Gijawane
- Shri Mahlaxi Mandir, Atyal
- Mangai dam, Atyal
- Shrimant Shri L. V. Desai (Bhadgaonkar Inamdarso) (Historical Place) Wada in Bhadgaon.
- Kadal Lake
- Shri Mangaidevi Temple Hiralage
- Shri Jotibha Temple Hiralage
- Shri Amruteshwer Temple Ningudage (11 km)
- Ganesh Temple, Inchnal
- Shri Ramlingeshwar Temple, Hebbal Kanool (7 km)

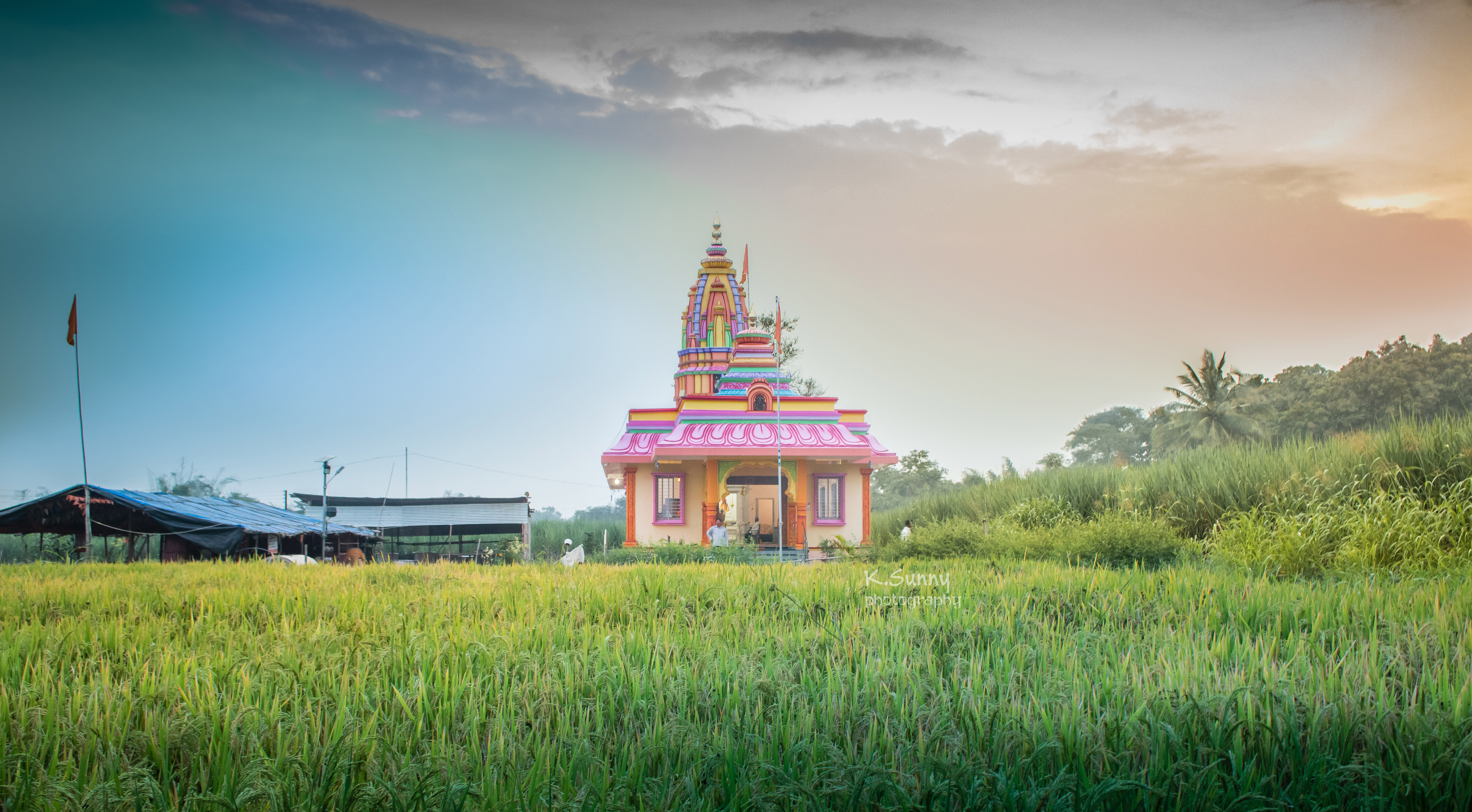
Shri Sant Balumama Temple.

- Shri Sant Balumama Temple, Gadhinglaj

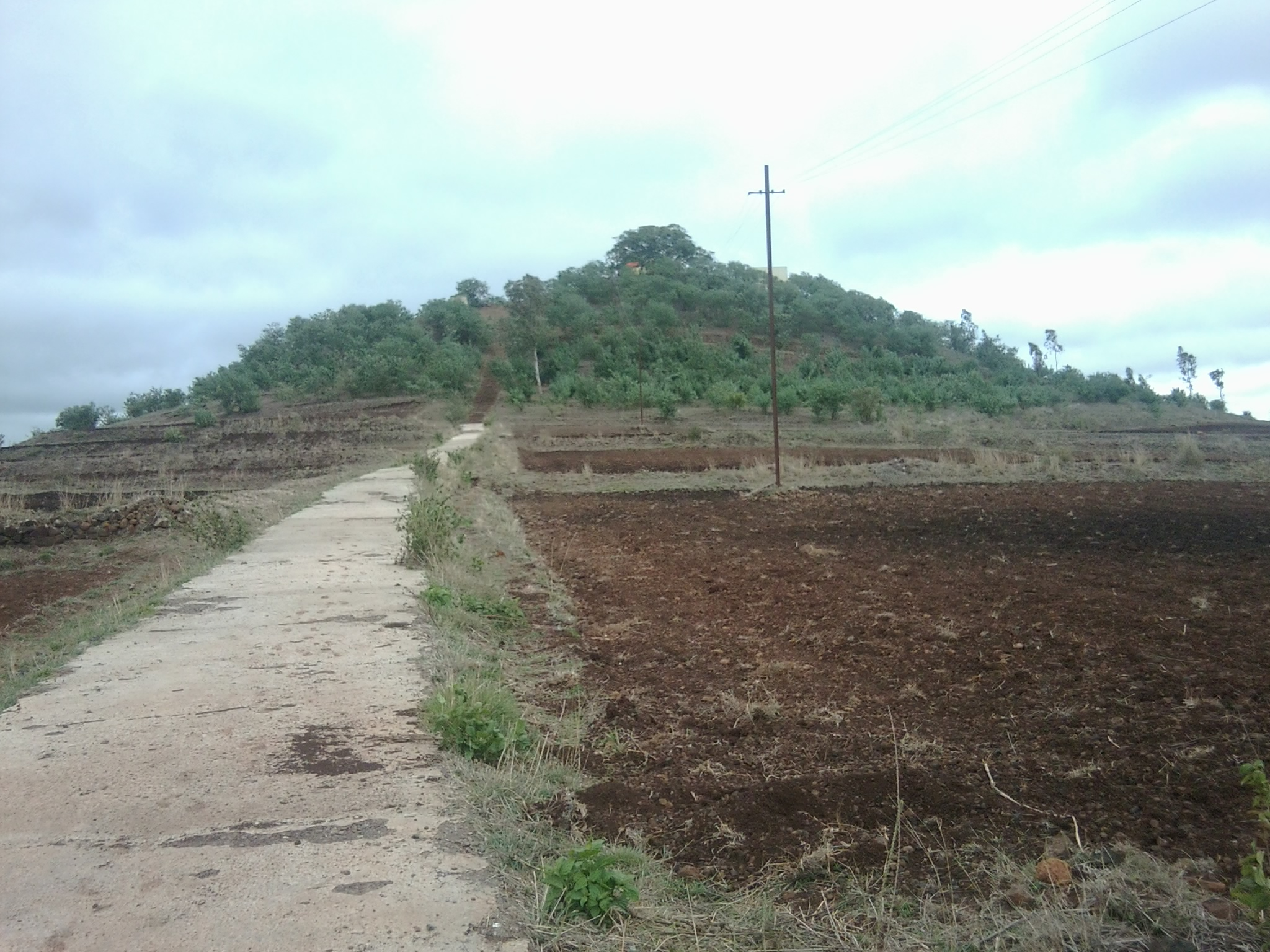
Guddai Temple, Bhadgaon, Tal-Gadhinglaj

== Sports ==
Gadhinglaj City has many sports facilities. These include a football stadium, numerous cricket grounds, and two sports complexes (one managed by the Municipal Council and the other by the Gadhinagar Housing Society Corporation). Both sports complexes include facilities for football, cricket, badminton, tennis, basketball, track, and swimming. The GHSC-run complex also includes an Olympic-sized swimming pool.

Football is the most popular sport in Gadhinglaj. It has been played in the city since 1920. At the high school/college level Maharani Radhabhai High School (M.R.) is the strongest team in Kolhapur district.

Ajit Krida Mandal started the tradition of the Interstate football tournament in Gadhinglaj on Diwali vacation. He organized this tournament for 20 years. After 1984, the Gadhinglaj Soccer Association and the Gadhinglaj Taluka Football Association maintained this Interstate tournament tradition. In 2004, the Gadhinglaj United Football Association took charge of organizing this tournament tradition.

Gadhinglaj United upgrade the standard of tournament to all India level. Teams participating in the tournament include SBI Kerala, Goa Sporting Club, Pune Football Club, Bangalore's Hindustan Aeronautics & Bharat Earth Moving Limited (BEML) teams, the Karnataka Police team, and Mumbai's Oil Natural Gas Corporation team, which have participated in the tournament for the last 11 years.

== Transportation ==
Gadhinglaj is connected to the rest of Maharashtra and India by the state highway system. It is situated on Maharashtra State Highway 134 and is about 15 kilometres (9.3 mi) from National Highway 4 (NH 4). MSRTC has regular bus service from Kolhapur city.

Distances to nearest major airports

- Dabolim Airport (Goa International Airport) : 160 kilometres (99 mi)
- Belgaum Airport : 54 kilometres (34 mi)
- Kolhapur Airport : 78 kilometres (48 mi)

The nearest railway stations are located in Belgaum to the south, Ghataprabha to the east, Kolhapur to the north, and Savantwadi to the west.

== See also ==
- Kaulage
- Narewadi
- Kadgaon
- Nesari
- Mahagaon, Gadhinglaj
- Harali
- Mugruwadi
- Halkarni
- Terani
- Gadhinglaj Taluka
- Bhadgoan
- Waghrali
- Ainapur
- Hiralage
- Harali Kh
- Harali Bk
