= Karambali =

Karambali is a Panchayat Town in Gadhinglaj Taluka of Kolhapur district. It is situated in the southwest corner of state Maharashtra, India. It has one village which is divided into four wards and it has two schools.

Karambali is situated on banks of Mangai Talav originated from the Great Amboli Ghats is about 30 km from Gadhinglaj towards south and 12 km from the second largest city Kadgaon in Gadhinglaj Taluka and just 2 km from Kaulage. It is managed by Town Council. In 2011 it has a population of about 15,856. Karambali is the eighth largest town in Gadhinglaj Taluka. The PIN code is 416526.

In September 2021, the town was in news when a youth returned the gold lost by a soldier.
