= Medhewadi =

Village in Maharashtra

Coordinates: 16°7′49.8″N 74°8′10.9″E

Medhewadi मेधेवाडी
- Village
- Interactive map of Medhewadi

Medhewadi is a village in Ajara taluka, one of the southernmost talukas of Kolhapur District of the Indian state of Maharashtra. It is situated on the banks of Hiranyakeshi river.

Medhewadi is on the road between Savantwadi and Kolhapur. It is the last place of the Desh region before reaching Konkan. Medhewadi is 90 km from Kolhapur and 30 km from Amboli Hill Station. Gadhinglaj is the nearest major city.

== Geography ==
It has an average elevation of 660 metres (2165 feet).

== Transport ==
MSRTC offers Bus service from tahsil AJARA TO MEDHEWADI. Apart from the busses people uses their own vehicles like two wheeler, four wheeler, truck, tractor and power trailer are major modes of transports.

== Facilities ==
The village hosts school. Medhewadi is famous for Chira (building stones), an ancient temple of the Lord Shiva Ramling.

== Demographics ==
The 2011 population of Medhewadi was nearly 600.

== Economy ==
Medhewadi is near a sugar factory in Gavse. A dam in Balohal near Chirekhan was sponsored by the government of Maharashtra. Ajara Ghansaal rice, karwand (fruit), and also devrai are important crops.
