= Kudnur Dam =

- Location within Maharashtra
- Official name: Kudnur Dam D04217
- Location: Chandgad
- Coordinates: 15.9763358°N 74.4248789°E
- Opening date: 2005
- Owners: Government of Maharashtra, India

Dam and spillways
- Type of dam: Earthfill
- Impounds: local river
- Height: 20.99 m (68.9 ft)
- Length: 316 m (1,037 ft)
- Dam volume: 208.68 km^{3} (50.06 cu mi)

Reservoir
- Total capacity: 1,062 km^{3} (255 cu mi)
- Surface area: 214 km^{2} (83 sq mi)

Kudnur Dam, is an earthfill dam on local river near Chandgad, Kolhapur district in state of Maharashtra in India.

== Specifications ==
The height of the dam above lowest foundation is 20.99 m (68.9 ft) while the length is 316 m (1,037 ft). The volume content is 208.68 km^{3} (50.06 cu mi) and gross storage capacity is 11,925.00 km^{3} (2,860.96 cu mi).

== Purpose ==
- Irrigation

== See also ==
- Dams in Maharashtra
- Chitri Dam
- Radhanagari Dam
- List of reservoirs and dams in India
