= Akkiwat =

- Village
- Akkiwat is in Belgaum district
- Country: India
- State: Karnataka
- District: Belgaum
- Talukas: Hukeri

Government
  - Type: Panchayat raj
  - Body: Village Panchayat

Languages
  - Official: Kannada
- Time zone: UTC+5:30 (IST)
- ISO 3166 code: IN-KA
- Vehicle registration: KA
- Nearest city: Belgaum
- Civic agency: Village Panchayat
- Website: karnataka.gov.in

Akkiwat is a village in the southern state of Karnataka, India. It is located in the Hukeri taluk of Belgaum district in Karnataka. It is situated 23km away from sub-district headquarter Hukkeri and 58km apart from district headquarter Belgaum. As per 2009 stats, Kesthi is the gram panchayat of Akkiwat village.

The total geographic area of the village is 169.51 hectares. Akkiwat has a total population of 1,060 peoples. There are about 237 houses in Akkiwat village. Sankeshwar is the most neighboring town to Akkiwat which is around 6km away.

== See also ==
- Belgaum
- Districts of Karnataka
