= Mugruwadi =

Mungurwadi
- Town
- Location in Maharashtra, India
- Coordinates: 16.113977°N 74.402375°E
- Country: India
- State: Maharashtra
- District: Kolhapur
- Established: 1500

Government
  - Type: Gram panchayat

Area
  - Total: 14.59 km^{2} (5.63 sq mi)
- Elevation: 1,979 m (6,493 ft)

Population (2011)
  - Total: 12,199
  - Rank: 10th in Gadhinglaj
  - Density: 836.1/km^{2} (2,166/sq mi)
- Demonym: Mugriwadiche

Languages
  - Official: Marathi
- Time zone: UTC+5:30 (IST)
- PIN: 416503
- Telephone code: 02327
- Vehicle registration: MH 09

Mungurwadi is a town in Gadhinglaj Taluka of Kolhapur district in Maharashtra, India. In 2001 it had a population of 3,271, but as of 2011, it has a population of 12,199. It is a major market place and the tenth largest settlement in Gadhinglaj taluka. Mungurwadi is about 24 km from Gadhinglaj, 29 km from second-largest settlement Kadgaon and 12 km from National Highway 48 (NH48).

== Geography ==
Mungurwadi is located at 16.113977°N 74.402375°E. It has an average elevation of 1,979 metres. It is a town, located near the border of Maharashtra and Karnataka. As the town lies on a hill, its climate is always cold with temperatures ranging from 27 °C to 19 °C in summer and 24 °C to 15 °C in winter. It is one of the most densely forested areas in Kolhapur.

== Demography ==
As of 2001 India census, Mugruwadi had a population of 3,271. But As of 2011 India Census Mugruwadi has a recent population is 12,199 which includes Mugruwadi town as well as extended areas included in the town. Its population grew four times in a decade and is one of the fastest-growing towns in Maharashtra. Males constitute 52% of the population and females 48%. Mugruwadi has an average literacy rate of 77%, higher than the national average of 74.9%: male literacy is 82%, and female literacy is 72%. In Mugruwadi, 15% of the population is under 6 years of age.
The languages most widely spoken is Marathi with 12,199 people speaking Marathi as their Primary Language. Hinduism is largest religion with 12,137 people following Hinduism followed by Muslim with 49 people and by Buddhist with 12 People.

== Civic administration ==
The civic administration of the town is managed by the Panchayat Samiti (town council). It gets its revenue from business and property taxes and is headed by a town council president who is assisted by the town council chief officer and council members.

== Transportation ==
Mugruwadi is connected to all major cities and towns of Maharashtra and rest of India it connected to numerous state highways and is about 15 km from National Highway 4 (NH 4).

Nearest major airports

- Vasco da Gama, Goa : Dabolim Airport 154 km
- Belgaum : 42 km
- Kolhapur : 92 km

Nearest railway stations

Belgaum towards south, Ghataprabha towards east, Kolhapur towards north and Savantwadi towards west. :
