= Ajara Ghansal rice =

Type of non-Basmati aromatic rice

Ajara Ghansal Rice (आजरा घनसाळ तांदूळ)
- Geographical indication
- Description: Ajara Ghansal is an aromatic rice cultivated in Maharashtra
- Type: Aromatic rice
- Area: Ajara taluka, Kolhapur
- Country: India
- Registered: 31 March 2016
- Official website: ipindia.gov.in

Ajara Ghansal is a variety of non-Basmati aromatic rice mainly grown in the Indian state of Maharashtra. It is a common and widely cultivated crop in Ajara taluka of Kolhapur district.

== Name ==
Ajara Ghansal Rice is a prized crop in Ajara and so named after it. "Ghan" means aroma while "Sal" means elegantly thin in the local language.

=== Local name ===
It is known as Ajara Ghansal Tandul (आजरा घनसाळ तांदूळ) or simply as Ghansal Tandul. Tandul means rice in the local state language of Marathi.

== Description ==
Ajara Ghansal rice is a traditional, aromatic, and indigenous rice variety from Maharashtra, known for its distinct aroma, taste, and nutritional value. It is characterized by short bold grains with a 3.61:5.5mm ratio and a creamy white appearance. Ajara Taluka, nestled amidst hills, leverages rainwater coming down from the hill slopes for rice cultivation. The nearby Hiranyakeshi river, just 5 km away, plays a crucial role in maintaining optimal soil moisture levels, ensuring ideal conditions for rice growth. The rice variety is renowned for its distinctive aroma, which is attributed to a complex blend of compounds, including alcohols, aldehydes, and esters . Ghansal rice has a firm, tender, and non-sticky texture, with no chalkiness which is seen in other varieties. It is less sticky than other rice varieties too with an elongation ratio significantly higher than Basmati rice.

== Uses ==
=== Culinary Uses ===
- Ideal for traditional Maharashtrian dishes, it is also typically served during special occasions such as marriage ceremonies and festivals.

=== Industrial Applications ===
- This rice variety is suitable for making puffed rice (Murmure), edible oil extraction from rice bran, and utilizing paddy straw in mushroom cultivation.

== Geographical indication ==
It was awarded the Geographical Indication (GI) status tag from the Geographical Indications Registry under the Union Government of India on 31 March 2016 (valid until 25 March 2034).

Ajara Taluka Shetkari Vikas Mandal from Ajara, proposed the GI registration of Ajara Ghansal rice. After filing the application in March 2014, the rice was granted the GI tag in 2016 by the Geographical Indication Registry in Chennai, making the name "Ajara Ghansal rice" exclusive to the rice grown in the region. It thus became the first rice variety from Maharashtra before Ambemohar and the 11th type of goods from Maharashtra to earn the GI tag.
