= Terani =

Village in Maharashtra

- Village
- Location in Maharashtra
- Coordinates: 16°07′49″N 74°28′09″E
- Country: India
- State: Maharashtra
- District: Kolhapur

Population
  - Total: 9,987

Languages
  - Official: Marathi, Kannada
- Time zone: UTC+5:30 (IST)
- PIN: 416506
- Vehicle registration: MH-09

Terani is a village located in the south west of Maharashtra, state of India. Administered by a Gram Panchayat, it is located in the Gadhinglaj taluka of Kolhapur district. It is situated at the border of Maharashtra and Karnataka.

Terani is surrounded by mountains and hills. The village also has its own water dam. This dam water is used for agriculture and for drinking purposes. Primary Education is available both in Marathi and Urdu language. Secondary school and junior college are also available in the Marathi language. People belong to different castes and communities with their unique cultures. The majority are Maratha, Lingayat & Vani, Kunbi, Muslim, Berad, Bhoi, Dhangar, Sutar, Lohar, Mahar, Matang. The majority are Maratha Ingawale, Narewadi, Uthale, Mangale.

== Demographics ==
The official language is Marathi. Kannada, Urdu, Hindi languages are also spoken.

In 2011, Terani's population was 9,987; it is the third largest populated place in Gadhinglaj Taluka. It is a growing village in terms of population and economy.
