= Harali =

Haladi Gaon Haladi
- Town
- Nickname: Gaon Haladi
- Location in Maharashtra, India
- Coordinates: 16.164613°N 74.338614°E
- Country: India
- State: Maharashtra
- District: Kolhapur
- Established: 1500
- Named for: Small Mountain

Government
  - Type: Town council
  - Body: Haladi Panchyate Samiti.

Area
  - Total: 10.29 km^{2} (3.97 sq mi)
- Elevation: 624 m (2,047 ft)

Population (2011)
  - Total: 9,856
  - Rank: 8 th in Gadhinglaj
  - Density: 957.8/km^{2} (2,481/sq mi)
- Demonym: Haladikar

Languages
  - Official: Marathi
- Time zone: UTC+5:30 (IST)
- PIN: 416502
- Telephone code: 02327
- Vehicle registration: MH 09

Haladi is a Town in Gadhinglaj Taluka Kolhapur district situated in the southwest corner of state Maharashtra, India. Harali is situated on banks of Hiranyakeshi river originated from the Great Amboli Ghats is about 7 km from Gadhinglaj towards south and 12 km from the second largest city Kadgaon in Gadhinglaj Taluka and just 2 km from Mahagaon, Gadhinglaj. It is managed by Town Council.In 2011 it has a population of about 9,856. Harali is the eight largest city and town in Gadhinglaj Taluka. Shri Appasaheb Nalawade Gadhinglaj Taluka Sahakari Sakhar Karkhana (sugar mills) is situated in the town.

== Geography ==
Harali is located at 16.164613°N 74.338614°E. It has an average elevation of 624 metres (2043 feet).
It is situated on banks of Hiranyakeshi river originated from the Great Amboli Ghats.Mahagaon has an average Weather of clean sky and temperature of around 19.c in winter and 27.c in Summer and have More rainfall than average in Kolhapur District It is a town, located near at the border of Maharashtra and Karnataka.

== History ==
History of Harali dates back to 1500 AD. It history is as old as Gadhinglaj it was a small village on the river Hiranyakeshi. But in recent years it has seen a boom in Economy, Population and in real estate. It now has become an important Town in it area and important market place..During 1970 Gadhinglaj Sugar Factory was founded by Late Dr. Appasaheb Nalawade in Harali thus starting both Industrial and Agriculture growth in the Gadhinglaj Taluka.

== Demography ==
As of 2001 India census, Harali had a population of 9,981. But As of 2011 India Census Harali has a recent population is 15,856 which includes Harali town as well as extended areas included in the town. Its population grew four times in a decade and is one of the fastest-growing towns in Maharashtra. Males constitute 51% of the population and females 49%. Harali has an average literacy rate of 77%, higher than the national average of 74.9%: male literacy is 82%, and female literacy is 72%. In Harali, 9% of the population is under 6 years of age.

== Civic Administration ==
The Civic Administration of this town is managed by Town council(Panchyat samiti). It gets it Revenues from Various Sectors for e.g. from tax collected from Business, Trading Business, Manufacturing, Shops, Rental Spaces, Property Tax, etc. The Panchyat samiti overseas the engineering works, health, sanitation, water supply, administration and taxation in the town. Harali Panchyat samiti is headed by a Town council President who is assisted by Town council chief officer and council members. The electrical supply to the Town is managed by the Maharashtra State Electricity Distribution Company Limited (MAHADISCOM). It has Maintained a World class Road and Civic Facilities thanks to its high Revenues collected from various Sectors.
