= Kadgaon =

Kadgaon Kort Kadgaon
- Town
- Nickname: Kort Kadgaon
- Location in Maharashtra, India
- Coordinates: 16.235854°N 74.304142°E
- Country: India
- State: Maharashtra
- District: Kolhapur
- Established: 1500 AD
- Named for: Near Border

Government
  - Type: Town Council
  - Body: Kadgaon Panchyat Samiti.

Area
  - Total: 15.77 km^{2} (6.09 sq mi)
- Elevation: 627 m (2,057 ft)

Population (2011)
  - Total: 5,775
  - Density: 366.2/km^{2} (948.5/sq mi)
- Demonym: Kadgaonche

Languages
  - Official: Marathi
- Time zone: UTC+5:30 (IST)
- PIN: 416536
- Telephone code: 02327
- Vehicle registration: MH 09

Kadgaon is a town situated Gadhinglaj Taluka of Kolhapur district situated in the southwest corner of the state of Maharashtra, India. Kadgaon is about 4 km from Gadhinglaj, 79 km from Kolhapur. Kadgaon is situated on MH SH 134 and is about 15 km from National Highway 48 (NH48). It is managed by Town Council. It is in the phase of transforming from a small town to a bustling city. It is the second-largest city after Gadhinglaj in Gadhinglaj Taluka also second largest city in Gadhinglaj sub division which Include talukas of Gadhinglaj, Ajra, Bhudargad, Chandgad. As of 2012 it has a population of about 20,851. Kadgaon has amenities that are of the level of Municipal Council in India. Kadgaon has developed as an industrial hub in recent years. It has a strong agricultural sector and is known for its sugarcane, jaggery and red chili production. It is well connected to all of Kolhapur and Maharashtra. It has a very excellent civic amenities. Like in most of the case in the Maharashtra the primary Language spoken is Marathi with 20,851 speaking as their primary Language.

== Geography ==
It has an average elevation of 627 metres (2043 feet). It has an average weather of clear sky and temperature of around 15 °C in winter and 24 °C in summer and has more rainfall than average in Kolhapur district. Kadgaon is situated on MH SH 134.

== History ==
History of Kadgaon dates back to 1500 AD. Its history is as old as Gadhinglaj and was always a bustling town. But in recent years it has seen a boom in its economy, population and in real estate. It now has become an industrial hub due to its proximity to the Gadhinglaj MIDC(GMIDC). It has left behind many neighbour towns like Ajra, Gargoti, Chandgad in terms of economy, population, etc. Kadgaon is projected to compete with Gadhinglaj in terms of economy, population, position, prosperity, etc.

The complete shooting of the movie "Devghar" took place in the village of Kadgaon in 1981.The writer of the film was Jagdish Khebudkar and the producer was Govind Kulkarni. Many of the artists were from the village. The movie is available on the YouTube channel. The lead roles in this movie are: Ranjana Deshmukh, Ravindra Mahajani, Chandrakant Gokhale, Vatsla Deshmukh, Datta Khebudkar, Ashok Saraf and Padma Chavan. The film became a superhit in 1982. The songs in this movie are very famous.

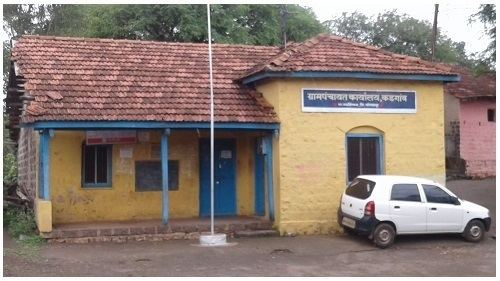
Grampanchayat office-Kadgaon

== Demographics ==
As of 2001 India census, Kadgaon had a population of 6,569. But As of 2011 India Census Kadgaon has a recent population is 20,851, which includes Kadgaon town as well as extended areas included in the town. Its population grew four times in a decade and is one of the fastest growing from town to a city in India. Males constitute 51% of the population and females 49%. Kadgaon has an average literacy rate of 79%, higher than the national average of 74.9%: male literacy is 85%, and female literacy is 74%. In Kadgaon, 19% of the population is under 6 years of age.

The language most widely spoken is Marathi. Hinduism is largest religion with 20,500 people following Hinduism followed Muslim with 123 and followed by Buddhist with 120 people and with 4 Catholic.

Religions in Kadgaon
Religion	Percent
Hindus	98.8%
Muslims	0.6%
Buddhists	0.6%
Distribution of religions †Includes Sikhs (0.1%).

== Civic Administration ==
The Civic Administration of this town is managed by Town council(Panchyat samiti). It is one of richest Town Councils in the country in its category. It gets its revenues from various sectors (e.g. from tax collected from Business, manufacturing, shops, rental spaces, property tax, etc.). The panchayat samiti overseas the engineering works, health, sanitation, water supply, administration and taxation in the city. Kadgaon Panchyat samiti is divided into five Special Wards namely, Patil wadi, Ayodha Nagar, Gokul Nagar, Kamale wadi, and Yamuna Nagar. Kadgaon Panchyat samiti is headed by a Town council President who is assisted by Town council chief officer and council members. The electrical supply to the town is managed by the Maharashtra State Electricity Distribution Company Limited (MAHADISCOM). It has maintained world-class roads and civic facilities thanks to its high revenues collected.

== Business ==
Kadgaon major businesses are trading, sugar production, and red chili. It is a marketing hub due to its proximity to Goa and Sindhudurg district and its industrial sector is developing on a very large scale for medium and light industries. Its Trading business is Booming on a large scale and became a major business, leaving agriculture behind. Real estate is booming in Kadgon like it has developed in Gadhinglaj due to its booming trading business and industries location, climate, excellent amenities, Roads, electricity, and abundant water supply led to a heavy investment in real estate by outsiders mainly from Kolhapur, Satara, Pune, and Mumbai. Kadgaon is an agriculture market popularly known for sugarcane and red chili, jaggery, food grains and vegetables and poultry industry is also raising. Some parts of Sindhudurg district and some parts of Goa state heavily rely on Kadgaon for food grains and vegetables. Shri Appasaheb Nalawade Gadhinglaj Taluka Sahakari Sakhar Karkhana (sugar mills) is situated 9 km from the town. Various business such as textile, marketing and trading also take on very large scales in Gadhinglaj nowadays. Textile and cloth treading has boomed as a major business in Kadgaon due to it being near Gadhinglaj. And Gadhinglaj is being near a textile-producing region.

== Economy ==
Kadgaon has major banks like ICICI Bank, Bank of Maharashtra, State Bank of India etc. are available in Gadhinglaj including some local banks. Economy is booming due to heavy investment in real estate, trading and strong agricultural sectors. Many banks have strong presence in Kadgaon town with a strong availability of ATMs due to its large-scale trading business in both textile and agriculture. For many years agriculture was dominant in Kadgaon due to its sugarcane and jaggery production until 2010 when trading business and industrial sector overtook agriculture. Kadgaon also has many stores and few departmental stores. It has a major market in Kolhapur and market day in Kadgaon is always on Sunday of every week.

=== Industrial sector ===
Kadgaon has become an industrial hub in Kolhapur District 79 km from Kolhapur Airport. Kadgaon has some famous industrial group plants such as Gokul which has a major production plant which is responsible for producing milk products in South Kolhapur and some other famous local names such as Sai plastic Industrie and other few others. The reason for a large number of industries in Kadgaon is that is Near To Gadhinglaj MIDC (GMIDC). It has abundant electricity and water supply which has driven the factors of the industrial sector.

=== Agriculture ===
Kadgaon is an agriculture market popularly known for sugarcane and red chili, jaggery, food grains and vegetables. Some parts of Sindhudurg district and some parts of Goa state heavily rely on Kadgaon for food grains and vegetables. It is also known for the jaggery production. Kadgaon is the major producer of Sugarcane in both Kolhapur and Maharashtra. It was the main sector of the economy of Kadgaon until it was overtaken by the business and industrial sector in 2010. Kadgaon is an agriculture market popularly known for sugarcane and red chilis, jaggery, food grains and vegetables. Some parts of Sindhudurg district and some parts of Goa state heavily rely on Kadgaon for food grains and vegetables. Shri Appasaheb Nalawade Gadhinglaj Taluka Sahakari Sakhar Karkhana (sugar mills) is situated 9 km from the town.

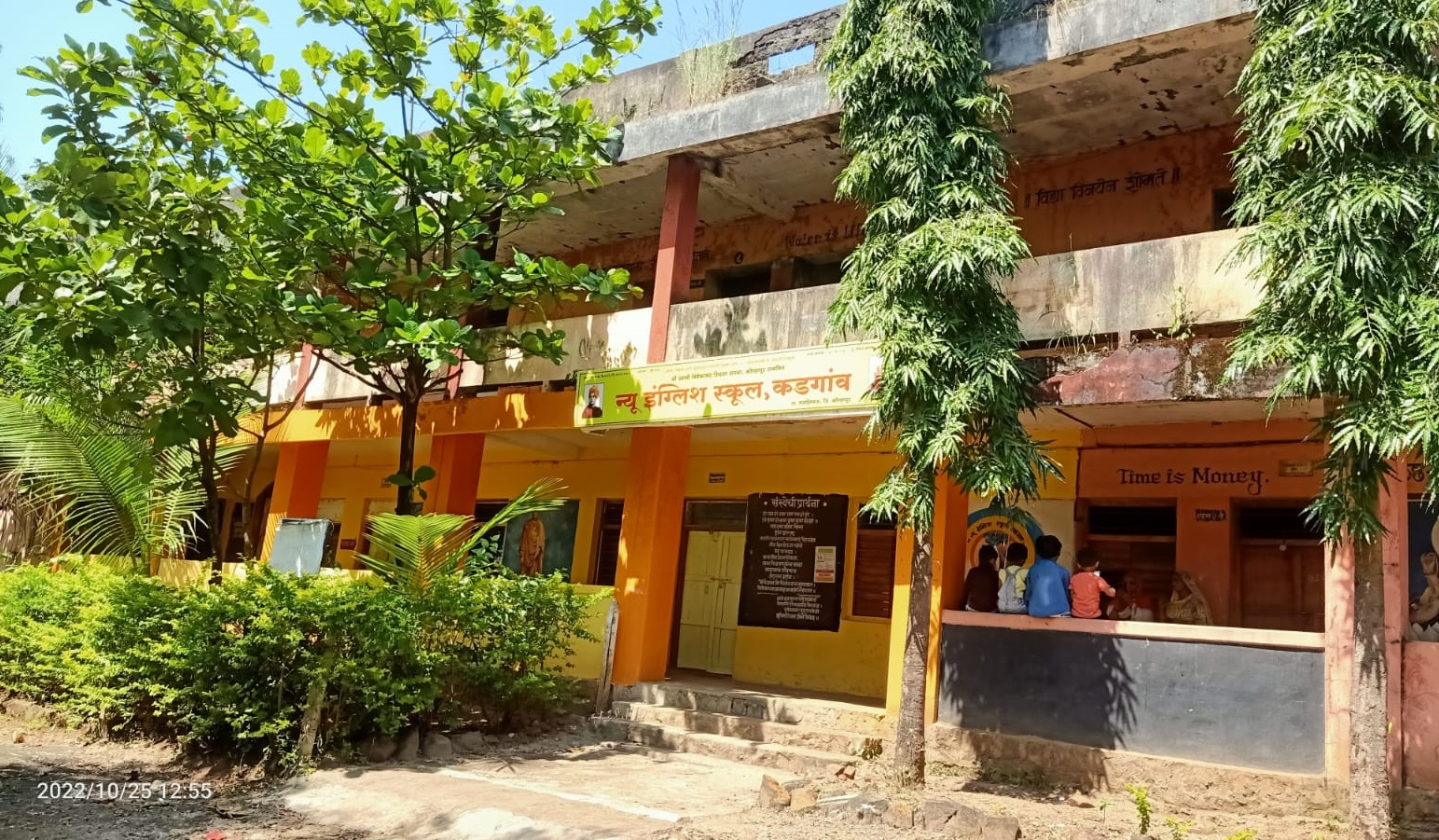
New English School-Kadgaon

== Education ==
Schools include:

- New English School-Kadgaon
- Zilla parishad Primary School
- Zilla Parishad Secondary School
- Zilla Parishad Secondary Boys School
- Zilla Parishad Secondary Girls School
- Zilla Parishad Nursery and K.G Play School
- Sai Polytechnice College
- Kadgaon Jr. College
- Kadgaon Sr. College
- Kadgaon English Medium High School
- Polytechnic Institutes of Kadgaon
- Kadgaon English Medium Nursery and K.G Play School
- Nagapana Batakali D.Ed. College
- Nagapana Batakali Nursing Institute
- Nagapana Batakali Jr. & Sr. College

== Places of tourist interest in and around Kadgaon ==
- Jotiba Temple, Kadgaon
- Amboli, Sindhudurg
- Prataprao Gurjar Smarak, Nesari (22 km away)
- Kalbhairav Temple
- Mahalaxmi Temple
- Ramling Temple, Virbhadra Temple, Laxmi Temple, Hanumaan Temple, and others around the town of Halkarni
- Samangarh (The hill fort)
- The Samangad grant, which belongs to the seventh Rasrakuta king Dantidurga or Dantivarma II, bears date sak 675 (A.D. 733–54)
- River Hiranyakeshi
- Kasturba garden
- Tilak garden
- Rajarshi Shahu garden
- Shendri lake
- Nakshatra Garden
- Chitri Dam (near Ajra)
- Laxmi Temple, Basarge
- kalavati devi temple{Hari mandir}, chidambarnagar
- Vittalai Temple & water tank
- Dr.Babasaheb Ambedkar Statue

== Sports ==
kadgaon football club Kadgaon has many Sport facilities like cricket ground, football and volleyball ground, tennis and badminton court, and has many national-level gyms. An international-level sport complex can be found about 4 km away in Gadhinglaj City.

== Transportation ==
Kadgaon is connected to all major cities and towns of Maharashtra and the rest of India; it is connected to numerous state highways. Kadgaon is situated on MH SH 134 and is about 15 km from National Highway 4 (NH 4). Kadgaon has three petrol pump gas stations, one each of Hindustan Petroleum, Bharat Petroleum, and Indian Oil Corporation.

Nearest major airports

- Vasco da Gama, Goa: Dabolim Airport 159 km
- Belgaum : 57 km
- Kolhapur: 79 km

Nearest railway stations Belgaum towards south, Ghataprabha towards east, Kolhapur towards north and Savantwadi towards west.

Other distances from Kadgaon

- Gadhinglaj: 4;km
- Sankeshwar (NH 4): 15 km
- Kolhapur: 69 km via Kalbhairi, 79 km via Sankeshwar
- Belgaum: 57 km via Kowad, 64 km via Sankeshwar
- Gokak Falls: 59 km
- Ramtirth waterfalls near Ajra: 17 km
- Amboli Hillstation: 52 km
- Savantwadi: 79 km
- Panjim via Amboli Ghat: 137 km
- Tilari Ghat: 54 km
- Panjim via Tilari Ghat: 129 km
- Goa:
1. Via Ajara, Amboli, Savantwadi
2. Via Nesari, Chandgad, Tilari, Dodamarg.
