= Kaulage =

Village in Maharashtra

Kaulage (कौलगे)
- Village
- Location in Maharastra, India
- Coordinates: 16.175°N 74.292°E
- Country: India
- State: Maharashtra
- District: Kolhapur

Population
  - Total: 5,100

Languages
  - Official: Marathi
  - Other spoken: Hindi
- Time zone: UTC+5:30 (IST)
- Postal code: 416526

Kaulage (कौलगे) is a village in Gadhinglaj Taluka in Kolhapur district of Maharashtra state India. The village is 10km away from Gadhinglaj. It is located on the Gadhinglaj-Ajara national highway 548 h and on the bank of Hiranyakeshi River.
