= Mahagaon, Gadhinglaj =

Mahagaon
- Town
- Location in Maharashtra, India
- Coordinates: 16.141846°N 74.336683°E
- Country: India
- State: Maharashtra
- District: Kolhapur
- Established: 1500

Government
  - Type: Town council
  - Body: Mahagao Panchyat Samiti.

Area
  - Total: 7.97 km^{2} (3.08 sq mi)
- Elevation: 624 m (2,047 ft)

Population (2011)
  - Total: 20,108
  - Rank: 4th in Gadhinglaj
  - Density: 2,520/km^{2} (6,530/sq mi)
- Demonym: Mahagaokar

Languages
  - Official: Marathi
- Time zone: UTC+5:30 (IST)
- PIN: 416503
- Telephone code: 02327
- Vehicle registration: MH 09

Mahagaon is a town in Gadhinglaj Taluka, Kolhapur district, situated in the southwest corner of the state of Maharashtra, India, on the banks of the Hiranyakeshi river. It is about 10 kilometres (6.2 mi) south of Gadhinglaj and 14 kilometres (8.7 mi) from the city of Kadgaon. It is managed by a town council. In 2011, it had a population of about 20,108.

== Geography ==
It has an average elevation of 624 metres (2,047 ft) and lies on the banks of the Hiranyakeshi river. It has an average temperature of around 18 °C in winter and 25 °C in summer and has more rainfall than average for Kolhapur district.

== History ==
History of Mahagaon dates back to 1500 AD. It history is as old as Gadhinglaj and Kadgaon it was always a bustling town. But in recent years it has seen a boom in economy, population and in real estate. It is an Important Education centre.

== Demography ==
As of 2001 India census, Mahagaon had a population of 14,549. But As of 2011 India census Mahagaon has a population is 20,108, which includes Mahagaon town as well as extended areas included in the town. Males constitute 51% of the population and females 49%. Mahagagaon has an average literacy rate of 78%, higher than the national average of 74.9%: male literacy is 84%, and female literacy is 72%. In Mahagaon, 11% of the population is under 6 years of age.

The language most widely spoken is Marathi with 20,108 people speaking Marathi as their primary language. Hinduism is the largest religion with 20,050 people following Hinduism followed by Muslim with 40 and by Catholic with 11 and then followed Buddhist with 7 peoples.

== Civic administration ==
The civic administration of the town is managed by a Gram Panchyat (town council). It is headed by the Sarpanch who is assisted by council chief officer and council members. The electrical supply to the city is managed by the Maharashtra State Electricity Distribution Company Limited (MAHADISCOM).

== Education ==
Mahagaon has many educational institutions. In recent years it is becoming a hub for Public and Boarding School. All this has happened due to its location, civic amenities and climates.

- Shivaji Vidhyalaya
- Mahatma Phule High School
- Jai Bharat English Medium School
- Sant Gajanan Maharaj Polytechnic Institutes
- Sant Gajanan Maharaj Engineering Institutes
- Sant Gajanan Maharaj Medical Institutes
- Sant Gajanan Maharaj Nursing Institutes
- Sant Gajanan Maharaj Arts College
- Sant Gajanan Maharaj Commerce College
- Sant Gajanan Maharaj Science College
- Sant Gajanan Maharaj Pharmacy Institutes
- Raja Shivchhatrapati Arts and Commerce College
- V. K. Chavan-Patil D.Ed. college
- Kaizen International School

== Economy ==
Mahagaon major businesses are education, trading, sugar production, and red chili. Marketing hub due to it is near Goa and Sindhudurg district and it education sector is developing on a very large scale for world-class and higher education. Its trading business and real estate is booming on a large scale. It has many national and local banks due to its economy.

== Places of interest ==
- Amboli, Sindhudurg.
- Samangarh, a hill fort.
- The Samangad grant, which belongs to the seventh Rasrakuta king Dantidurga or Dantivarma II, bears date sak 675 (A.D. 733–54).

== Transportation ==
Mahagaon is connected to all major cities and towns of Maharashtra and the rest of India by numerous state highways and is about 15 km from National Highway 4 (NH 4).

=== Nearest major airports ===
- Vasco da Gama, Goa : Dabolim Airport 157 km
- Belgaum : 54 km
- Kolhapur : 82 km

=== Nearest railway stations ===
Belgaum towards south, Ghataprabha towards east, Kolhapur towards north and Savantwadi towards west.

Other distances from Mahagaon

- Sankeshwar (NH 4) : 22 km
- Kolhapur : 82 km via Kalbhairi, 76 km via Sankeshwar
- Belgaum : 47 km via Kowad, 62 km via Sankeshwar
- Gadhinglaj : 10 km
- Kadgaon : 14 km
- Nesari : 12 km
- Gokak Falls : 57 km
- Ramtirth waterfalls near Ajara : 22 km
- Amboli Hillstation : 57 km
- Savantwadi : 84 km
- Panjim via Amboli Ghat : 139 km
- Tilari Ghat : 54 km
- Panjim via Tilari Ghat : 132 km
- Goa :
- shri Chaloba Temple kadal : 7 ; km
