= Pedrewadi =

Village in Maharashtra

Coordinates: 16.12°N 74.2°E

Pedrewadi पेद्रेवाडी
- Interactive map of Pedrewadi
- State: Maharastra

Pedrewadi is a small village in Ajra Taluka, Kolhapur District, Maharashtra, India. Sunderwadi is an alias of Pedrewadi.
