= Samangad =

Fort in Maharashtra, India

Samangad is a hill fort in Kolhapur District, Maharashtra. It is 2,600 feet (790 m) above sea level. The fort is situated on the oval-shaped top of the hill. The eight-foot-high wall of the fort which encircled the hill top is still intact. Earlier several cisterns cut out of the rock ensured a plentiful supply of water to the fort but by 1957 most of them were in ruins.

In 1676, the fortifications were considerably improved by Shivaji, subsequent to which it was known as one of the "smallest yet strongest forts" of the great Marathas. In 1844, the Samangad garrison rebelled and took over the fort, shutting the gates. But it was stormed by the British Raj under a General Delamotte and retaken from the rebelling soldiers. The British Raj dismantled the fort and it has been in ruins ever since.
