= Nesari =

- village
- Interactive map of Nesari
- Coordinates: 16.066743°N 74.332702°E
- India: India
- State: Kolhapur

Government
  - Type: gram panchayat

Area
  - Total: 10.69 km^{2} (4.13 sq mi)
- Elevation: 1,599 m (5,246 ft)

Population (2021)
  - Total: 9,000

Languages
  - Official: Marathi
- Time zone: UTC+5:30 (IST)
- PIN: 416504
- Telephone code: 02327
- Vehicle registration: MH 09

Nesari is a village in Gadhinglaj Taluka of Kolhapur district in Maharashtra, India. As of 2011, it had a population of 21,000. It is about 20 kilometres from Gadhinglaj, and 30 kilometres from National Highway 48 (NH48).

== Geography ==
Nesari is located near the border of Maharashtra and Karnataka. The coordinates are 16.066743°N 74.332702°E. It has an average elevation of 625 meters, and average temperatures of 19 °C in winter and 26 °C in summer.

== Demographics ==
According to the 2011 India census, Nesari has a population of 19,000 which includes Nesari town as well as extended areas included in the town. Nesari has an average literacy rate of 85% as compared to the national average of 74.9%. The male literacy stands at 84%, and female literacy is 72%. In Nesari, 9% of the population is under 6 years of age.

The language most widely spoken is Marathi with 19,000 people speaking Marathi as their primary language.

== History ==
Prataprao Gujar, Kudtoji Gujar, was the third royal Senapati of King Chhatrapati Shivaji Maharaj's army, a successful guerrilla force in 17th century India. He was given the title of Prataprao (the brave) by King Shivaji in acknowledgement of his bravery in the war against Mirza Jaisingh.

He was a highly gifted aristocratic general, who enjoyed the trust of his king and the loyalty of his troops. He defeated a large mughal army at the Battle of Salher. The battle was the first large-scale pitched battle between the two in open field. The victory of the Marathas is seen as a defining turning point in their war against the Mughals. Prataprao Gujar's major drawback was his impulsive emotional nature.

A few months before King Shivaji's coronation in 1674, Prataprao Gujar was sent to deal with the invading force led by the Adilshahi general, Bahalol Khan. The Maratha army surrounded the camp of Bahalol Khan at Nesari. Prataprao's forces defeated and captured the opposing general in the battle. In spite of specific warnings against doing so by King Shivaji, Prataprao released Bahalol Khan along troops and the seized war material, when Bahalol Khan promised not to invade King Shivaji's territories again. Days after his release Bahalol Khan started preparing for a new invasion.

When King Shivaji heard of about Prataprao decision, he was incensed and wrote an angry letter to Prataprao refusing him permission to see him until Bahlol Khan was re-captured. Prataprao realised his mistake and intended to capture Bahlol Khan at any cost.

One day, he learned Bahlol Khan was camping nearby. Prataprao decided to make a stand against Balol Khan at Nesari. Prataprao Gujar was supported with 1,200 troops versus Khan's 15,000. Prataprao reasoned that there was no point in taking 1,200 men to suicide with him. So, in a fit of anger, he left alone, without asking his cavalry to charge. On seeing their leader head to certain death, six other Maratha sardars joined him in the charge, they attacked the enemy camp and were slaughtered. Anandrao and Hansaji Mohite, though, stayed back. The loss of Prataprao Gujar was a blow to the Marathas. Anandrao and Mohite managed to take the army to safety.

King Shivaji was deeply grieved on hearing of Pratprao's death. Later, Chhatrapati Shivaji's army avenged the death of their general, by defeating Bahlol Khan and looting his jagir (fiefdom) under the leadership of Anandrao and Hambirao Mohite. Hambirrao Mohite became the new Sarnaubat (Commander-in-chief of the Maratha forces). King Shivaji also married his second son, Rajaram, to the daughter of Prataprao Gujar; who was later to be the Empress of the Maratha Empire, Maharani Jankibai.

The story of the strike and the ensuing battle was adapted into a Marathi drama Vedat Marathe Veer Daudle Saat, written by Bashir Momin Kavathekar. The song "Vedaat Marathe Veer Daudle Saat" was written by Kusumagraj and sung by Lata Mangeshkar.

On 8 October 2014, DAR Motion Pictures, IME Motion Pictures and Blue Drop Films jointly announced a Marathi feature film based on the battle. The film, titled Saat, was slated for a 2016 release. Recently Mahesh Manjrekar also announced a Hindi movie Vedat Marathe Veer Daudle Saat, an adaptation of Momin Kavathekar's Marathi drama.

Religions in Nesari
Religion	Percent
Hindus	99.6%
Muslims	0.2%
Buddhists	0.1%
Others†	0.1%
Distribution of religions †Includes Sikhs (0.1%), Buddhists (<0.1%).

== Schools ==
1. Chatrapati Shivaji Jr, College, Nesari.

2. Arts and Commerce College, Nesari

3. S.S. High School, Nesari

4. S.P.G. High School, Nesari

5. V.K. Chavhan High School, Nesari

6. Progressive English Medium School, Nesari

7. S.S. English Medium School Nesari

8. St. Xavier's English Medium High School Nesari

9. कुमार विद्यामंदीर नेसरी

10. कन्या विद्यामंदीर नेसरी

11. Roshanbi Shamanji College of Agriculture, Nesari

== Civic administration ==
The civic administration of the village is managed by the Nesari gram panchayat.

== Economy ==
The major areas of commerce of Nesari are trading, sugar production, and red chili. Nearby marketing hubs include Goa and Sindhudurg district.

== Transportation ==
Nesari is connected to the various towns of Maharashtra via several state highways and is about 15 km from National Highway 4(NH 4). The nearest airport at Belgaum is 39 km away.
