= Gadhinglaj taluka =

Gadhinglaj Taluka
- taluka
- Location of Gadhinglaj Taluka, Kolhapur district in Maharashtra
- Country: India
- State: Maharashtra
- Division: Pune Division
- District: Kolhapur District
- Headquarters: Gadhinglaj

Government
  - Lok Sabha constituencies: 1. Kolhapur Based on (Election Commission website)

Population (2011)
  - Total: 874,015

Demographics
  - Literacy: 85.1%
  - Sex ratio: 979
- Time zone: UTC+05:30 (IST)
- Major highways: NH-4

Gadhinglaj is a taluka in Maharashtra. The city of Gadhinglaj is the headquarters of the taluka and Gadhinglaj subdivision. As of 2011, the taluka had a population of 874,015, of which 35% were urban. Languages spoken in this area are Marathi, Kannada, Hindi and English also. But the most-spoken language is Marathi, as Marathi is a state language.

== Gadhinglaj ==
Gadhinglaj is a city and municipality in the Gadhinglaj Taluka, a subdivision of the Kolhapur district, state of Maharashtra, India. It is the headquarters of the taluka.

It shares with most of the cities in Maharashtra that the main language spoken is Marathi. Gadhinglaj is situated on the banks of the river Hiranyakeshi. In 2011 its population was 79,997; it is the third largest city in Kolhapur District.

Gadhinglaj is at 16.23°N 74.35°E. It has an average elevation of 623 metres (2043 feet).

It is at the border of Maharashtra and Karnataka. It is a growing city in terms of population and economy. The majority of people are Hindu, very few Muslims and a small number of other religions.

== Kadgaon ==
Kadgaon is a Town situated Gadhinglaj Taluka of Kolhapur district situated in the southwest corner of state Maharashtra, India. Kadgaon is about 4 km from Gadhinglaj, 79 km from Kolhapur and about 15 km from National Highway 48 (NH48). It is managed by Town Council. It is in the phase of transforming from a small town to a bustling city. It is the second largest city after Gadhinglaj in Gadhinglaj Taluka also second largest city in Gadhinglaj sub division which include talukas of Gadhinglaj, Ajra, Bhudargad, Chandgad.

As of 2012 it has a population of about 20,851. Kadgaon has an amenities that are of the Level of Municipal Council in India. Kadgaon has developed as an industrial hub in recent years. It has a strong agricultural sector and is known for its sugarcane, jaggery and red chili production. Kadgaon is at 16.235854°N 74.304142°E.

It has an average elevation of 627 metres (2043 feet).

It has an average weather of clear sky and temperature of around 15 °C in winter and 24 °C in summer and has more rainfall than average in Kolhapur District. It is a town near at the border of Maharashtra and Karnataka. It is well connected to all of Kolhapur and Maharashtra. It has a very excellent civic amenities. As is usual in Maharashtra the primary language spoken is Marathi with 20,851 speaking as their primary language.

== Nesari ==
Nesari is a town in Gadhinglaj Taluka of Kolhapur district in Maharashtra, India. In 2001 it had a population of 15,299, but as of 2011 it has population of 20,249. It is a major market place and third largest settlement in Gadhinglaj taluka. Nesari is about 22 km from Gadhinglaj, 24 kmm from the second largest settlement Kadgaon and 19 km from National Highway 48 (NH48). Nesari is a city in India, near the border of Maharashtra and Karnataka, co-ordinates 16.066743°N 74.332702°E. It has an average elevation of 1,599 metres. It has an average temperature of 19 °C in winter and 26 °C in summer.

== Mahagaon, Gadhinglaj ==
Mahagaon is a Town in Gadhinglaj Taluka Kolhapur district situated in the southwest corner of the state Maharashtra, India. Mahagaon is situated on banks of Hiranyakeshi river originated from the Great Amboli Ghats is about 10 km from Gadhinglaj towards south and 14 km from the second-largest city Kadgaon in Gadhinglaj Taluka. Mahagaon is at 16.14184°N 74.336683°E.

It has an average elevation of 624 metres (2043 feet).

It is situated on banks of Hiranyakeshi river originated from the Great Amboli Ghats. Mahagaon has an average Weather of clear sky and temperature of around 18 °C in winter and 25 °C in summer and has more rainfall than average in Kolhapur District. It is a town near at the border of Maharashtra and Karnataka. It is managed by Town Council. In 2011 it has a population of about 20,108. Mahagaon is fourth-largest city in Gadhinglaj Taluka. It is a major town and educational center in South Maharashtra.

== Harali ==
Harali is a Town in Gadhinglaj Taluka Kolhapur district situated in the southwest corner of state Maharashtra, India. Harali is situated on banks of Hiranyakeshi river originated from the Great Amboli Ghats is about 7 km from Gadhinglaj towards south and 12 km from the second-largest city Kadgaon in Gadhinglaj Taluka and just 2 km from Mahagaon, Gadhinglaj. It is managed by Town Council. In 2011 it has a population of about 15,856. Harali is eight largest city and town in Gadhinglaj Taluka. Shri Appasaheb Nalawade Gadhinglaj Taluka Sahakari Sakhar Karkhana (sugar mills) is situated in the Town. Harali is at 16.164613°N 74.338614°E.

It has an average elevation of 624 metres (2043 feet).

It is situated on banks of Hiranyakeshi river originated from the Great Amboli Ghats. Mahagaon has an average weather of clear sky and temperature of around 19 °C in winter and 27 °C in summer and has more rainfall than average in Kolhapur District.

== Basarge BK ==
According to Census 2011 information the location code or village code of Basarge Bk village is 416506. Basarge Bk village is located in Gadhinglaj tehsil of Kolhapur district in Maharashtra, India. It is situated 22 km away from sub-district headquarter Gadhinglaj (tehsildar office) and 80 km away from district headquarter Kolhapur. As per 2009 stats, Basarge Budruk is the gram panchayat of Basarge Bk village.

The total geographical area of village is 749 hectares. Basarge Bk has a total population of 4,136 peoples, out of which male population is 2,001 while female population is 2,135. Literacy rate of basarge bk village is 67.43% out of which 75.31% males and 60.05% females are literate. There are about 959 houses in basarge bk village. Pincode of basarge bk village locality is 416506.

When it comes to administration, Basarge Bk village is administrated by a sarpanch who is elected representative of the village by the local elections. As per 2019 stats, Basarge Bk village comes under Chandgad assembly constituency & Kolhapur parliamentary constituency. Sankeshwar(karnataka) is nearest town to basarge bk for all major economic activities, which is approximately 10 km away.

== Mungurwadi ==
Mungurwadi is a town in Gadhinglaj Taluka of the Kolhapur district, state of Maharashtra, India. In 2001 it had a population of 3,271, but as of 2011, it has population of 12,199. It is a major market place and tenth largest settlement in Gadhinglaj taluka. Mungurwadi is about 24 km from Gadhinglaj, 29 km from second largest settlement Kadgaon and 12 km from National Highway 48 (NH48).Mungurwadi is at 16.113977°N 74.402375°E.

It has an average elevation of 1,979 metres. It is a town near the border of Maharashtra and Karnataka. As the town lies on a hill, its climate is always cold with temperatures ranging from 27 °C to 19 °C in summer and 24 °C to 15 °C in winter. It is one of the most densely forested areas in Kolhapur.

== List of largest settlement in Gadhinglaj Taluka ==
Rank	City	Population (2011)
1	Gadhinglaj	79,997
2	Kadgaon	20,851
3	Nesari	20,249
4	Mahagaon, Gadhinglaj	20,108
5	Harali	15,856
6	Mugruwadi	12,199
7	Halkarni	9,000
8	kaulage	5,199
9	Karambali	7,199
10	Gijawane	7,236
