= Chitri Dam =

chand
- Location within Maharashtra
- Official name: Chitri Dam D03132
- Location: Ajara
- Coordinates: 16.071886°N 74.159493°E
- Opening date: 2001
- Owners: Government of Maharashtra, India

Dam and spillways
- Type of dam: Earthfill
- Impounds: Chitri river
- Height: 55.1 m (181 ft)
- Length: 1,710 m (5,610 ft)
- Dam volume: 2,606 km^{3} (625 cu mi)

Reservoir
- Total capacity: 52,359 km^{3} (12,562 cu mi)
- Surface area: 2,931 km^{2} (1,132 sq mi)

Chitri Dam, is an earthfill dam on Chitri river near Ajara, Kolhapur district in state of Maharashtra in India. This Dam have capacity of 1.88 TMC

== Specifications ==
The height of the dam above lowest foundation is 55.1 m (181 ft) while the length is 1,710 m (5,610 ft). The volume content is 2,606 km^{3} (625 cu mi)

== Purpose ==
- Irrigation
- Power House

== See also ==
- Dams in Maharashtra
- List of reservoirs and dams in India
