= Halkarni =

- town
- Location in Maharashtra, India
- Coordinates: 16°10′0″N 74°28′0″E
- Country: India
- State: Maharashtra
- District: Kolhapur

Population
  - Total: 9,000

Languages
  - Official: Marathi, Kannada
- Time zone: UTC+5:30 (IST)
- PIN: 416506
- Vehicle registration: MH-09

Halkarni is a city situated in the south west corner of Maharashtra, TK: Gadhinglaj Taluka, Kolhapur district - 416506, India. The population of Halkarni is around 9,000. It is surrounded by hills. The distance between Gadhinglaj and Halkarni is about 20 km. Buggdikatti and Terani are villages surrounding it . A police station is situated in the village for the security of people. There are number of private hospitals and medicals are available in the village. A government hospital was built. Water is supplied to the whole village through a well in NAREWADI village through a pipeline. Farming is the main occupation of the villagers. They have a side business of selling milk cow or buffalo to the milk dairies. A Maharashtra state electricity board (MSEB) substation is installed outside the village. Halkarni is connected to Gadahinglaj via state transport buses (ST buses). Halkarni is also connected to Karnataka via Khanapur through Karnataka state transport buses . The route of entering in Karnataka from Maharashra is HALKARNI TO SANKESHWAR. Private traveller companies came to exist which gives services to reach Mumbai and Pune.

== Language ==
Marathi being the state language is also spoken as a local language in Halkarni. Marathi is widely understood in Halkarni. English is also used in social communication.

Halkarni is popular for its market area. It is famous for tobacco powder (in Marathi called as Tapkir). It is surrounded by Basarge, Khanapur, and there are many temples like Ramling, Virbhadra, laxmi, Hanuman, the Jain temple, etc.

The schools are in Halalkarni :

Halkarni Bhag High School, Halkarni. Now junior college is also started... Urdu Vidya Mandir Halkarni, Now started Urdh High School....
