= Hiranyakeshi River =

River in India

Coordinates: 15.954959°N 74.027239°E

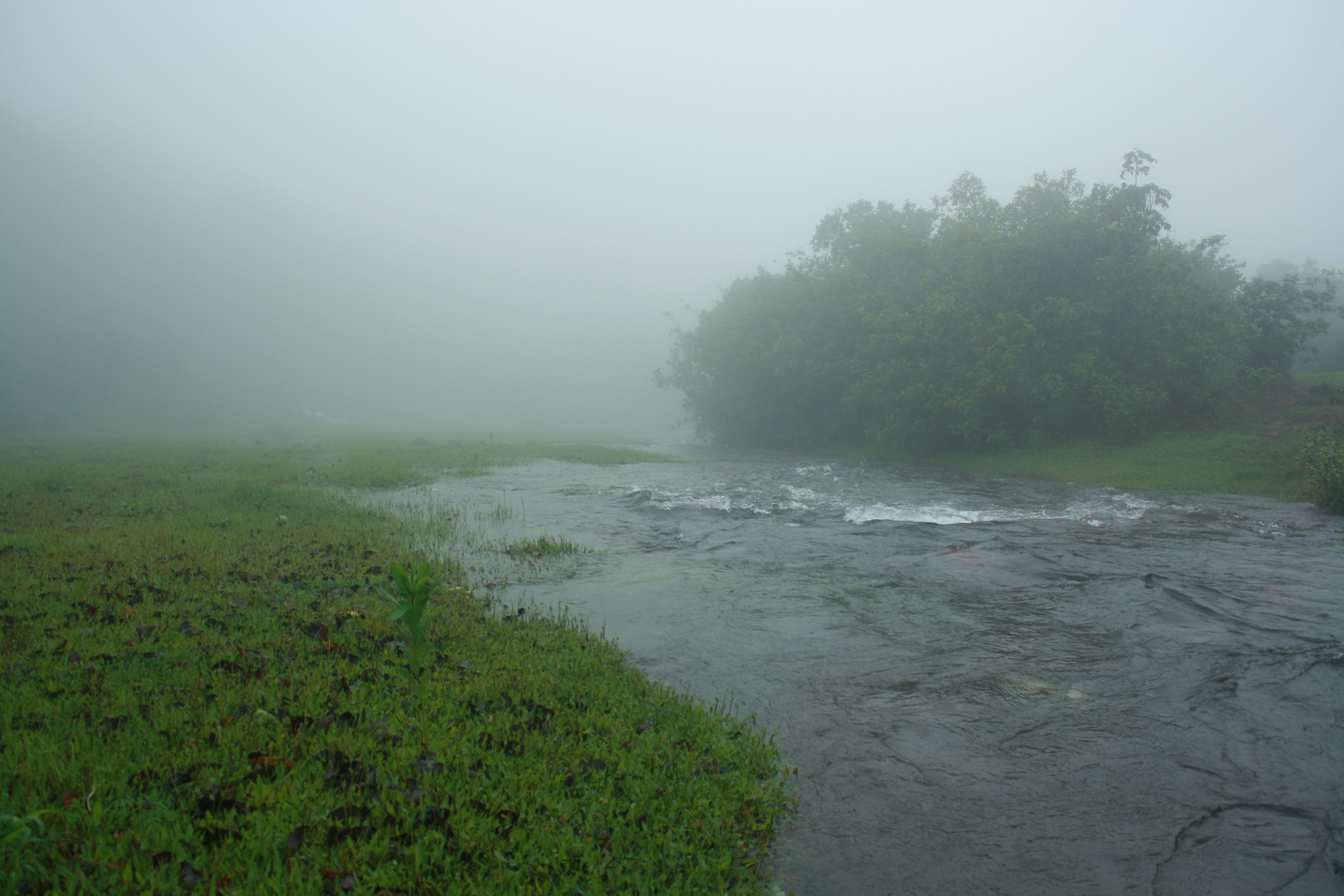
- Rapid currents of the Hiranyakeshi river

Location
- Country: India
- State: Maharashtra, Karnataka

Physical characteristics
- Source: Amboli
  - location: Maharashtra, India
- Mouth: Ghataprabha River
  - location: Karnataka, India
- Length: 109 km
- Discharge
  - location: mouth

Basin features
- River system: Krishna River

The Hiranyakeshi river is a left-bank tributary of the Ghataprabha River originating in the Western Ghats in the Sindhudurg district of Maharashtra.

== Etymology ==
The river derives its name from the Sri Hiranyakeshi temple. The temple is built over caves from where the river originates as a fresh mountain stream. Hiranyakeshi is a Sanskrit word which means "one with golden hair" and refers to the Hindu goddess Parvati.

== Course ==
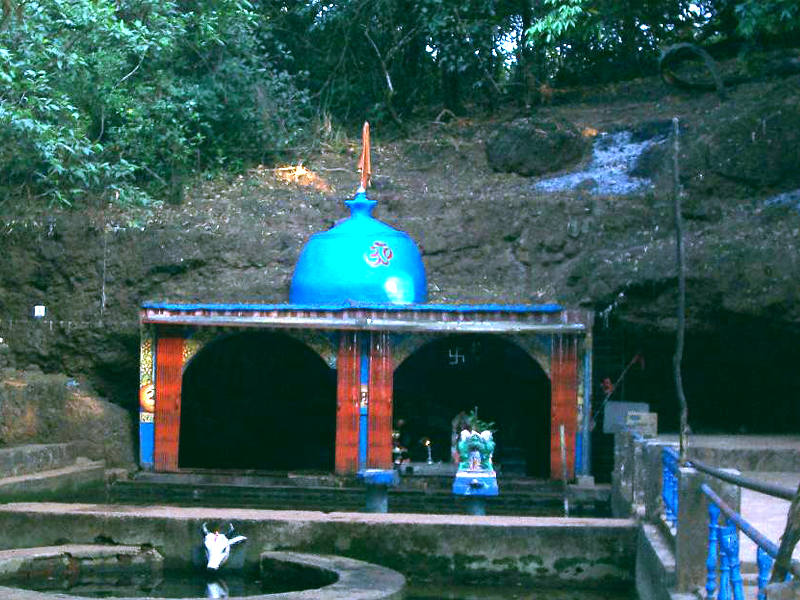
Sri Hiranyakeshi temple

The river begins in the caves in Hiranyakeshwar temple near the hill station of Amboli. It flows northwest towards Jakatwadi, a small village next to Amboli, where it turns right almost at a right angle and begins to flow east. It flows underneath a bridge supporting state highway 121, which the British named Victoria Jubilee Bridge and goes northeast to the town of Ajra in the Kolhapur district of Maharashtra.

2 km before it reaches Ajra, the river plunges over a rocky ledge about 5 metres high forming the Ramteerth falls and then crosses under another bridge. It continues its run now along the right side of SH 134 crossing over into the Belgaum district, Karnataka. At the town of Sankeshwar it goes southeast for a short distance before it converges with Ghataprabha river after Hidkal dam and before Gokak falls.

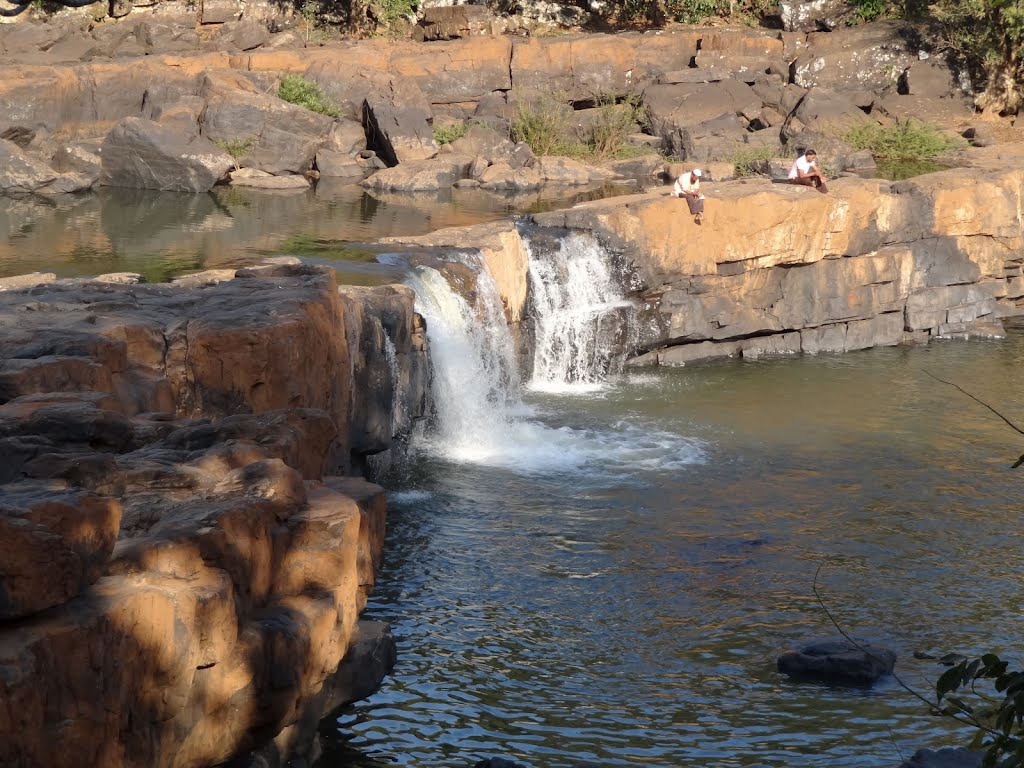
Ramteerth falls at Ajra

== Irrigation ==
Two barriers constructed over the river, known as the Dabhil weir and the Devarde weir, provide irrigation water to the neighbouring villages.

== Ecology ==
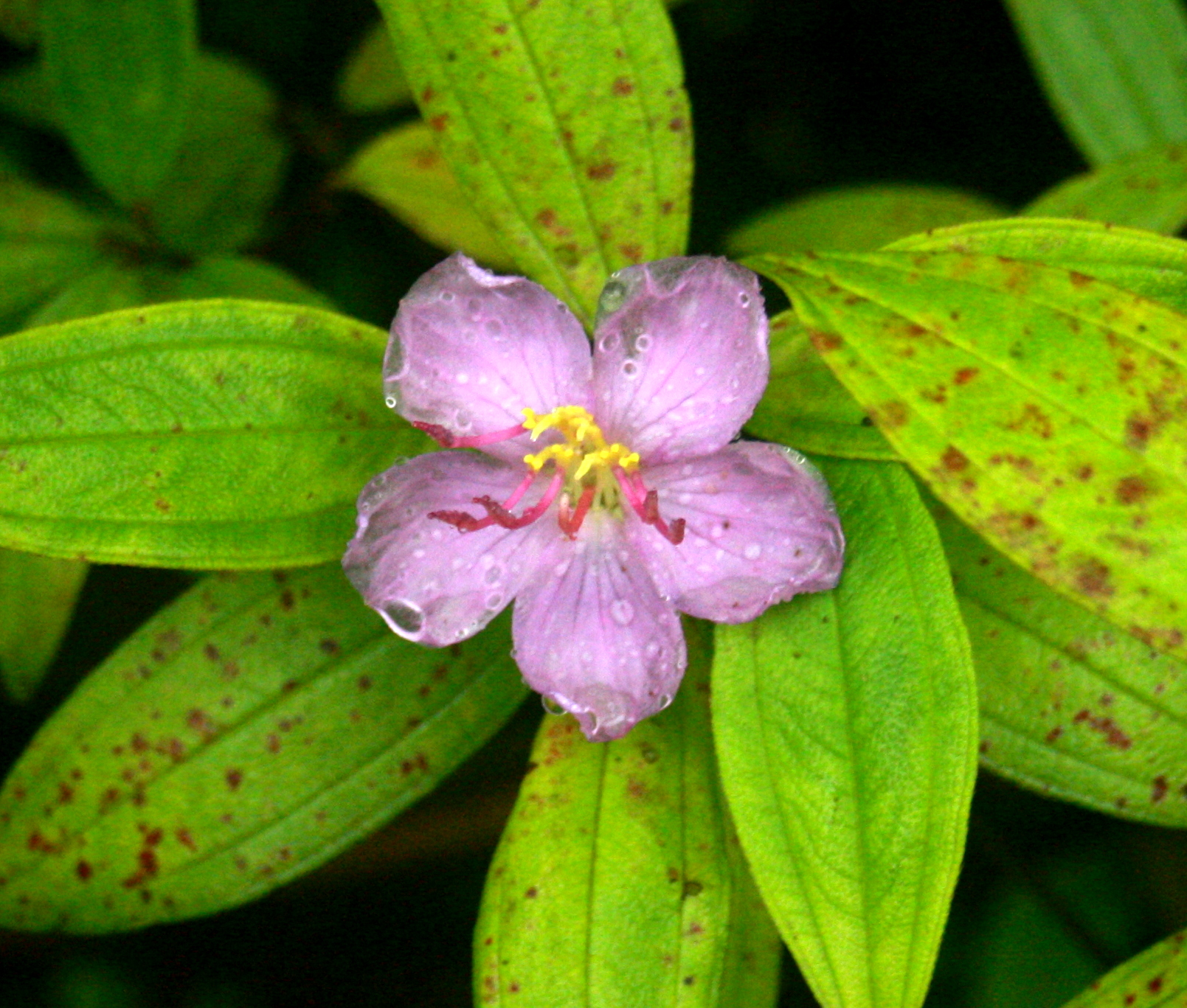
Malabar melastome grows along the banks of the river.

The area around the river's origin being a sacred groove is protected by the locals. During the monsoon months, fresh rain water transforms the landscape into a lush green oasis with different types of mushrooms which sprout out along its banks. There are also a variety of plants like karvi and malabar melastome.

== Water pollution status ==
Physico-chemical analysis showed that the water of the Hiranyakeshi River was in 2010 mostly within the limits of WHO standards with the exemption of samples taken at Chicalgud because of the addition of domestic sewage and sugar mill effluents.

== Places of interest ==
- Hiranyakeshwar temple
- Ramteerth temple
- Amboli hill-station
