= Amboli, Sindhudurg =

Amboli
- Village
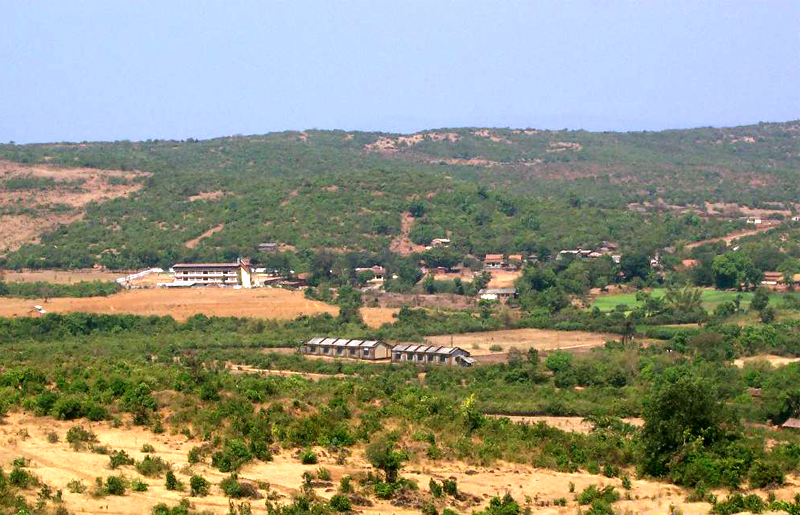
- Amboli Hill Station

- Location in Maharashtra, India
- Coordinates: 15°57′45″N 73°59′52″E
- Country: India
- State: Maharashtra
- District: Sindhudurg

Government
  - Sarpanch: Savitri Palekar

Population (2001)
  - Total: 4,004

Language
  - Official: Marathi
- Time zone: UTC+5:30 (IST)
- Postal code: 416510
- Telephone code: 02363
- Vehicle registration: MH-07
- Website: ambilihillstation.In

Amboli is a small village in the southern Konkan Division, Sindhudurg district, Maharashtra state, India. Amboli Ghat lies at an altitude of approximately 700 metres (2,300 feet) above sea level and is the last hill resort before ending in the coastal plains of Goa state.

Amboli lies in the Western Ghats of peninsular India, one of the world's "Ecological Hotspots" and it abounds in unusual flora and fauna. However, as in the other parts of the Sahaydri Hills, denudation of the forest cover and unregulated government-assisted development are gradually ruining a once-pristine environment.

Historically, Amboli village came into being as one of the staging posts along the road from Vengurla port to the city of Belgaum, which was extensively used by the British to supply their garrisons in south and central India.

The source of the Hiranyakeshi river lies in the hills around Amboli village and farmers cultivate rice in it. An ancient Shiva temple (called Hiranyakeshwar) sits at the cave where the water emerges. The main attraction for tourists is the incredibly-high rainfall (7 m average, per year) and the numerous waterfalls and mist during the monsoons. Legend has it that there are 108 Shiva temples in and around Amboli, of which only a dozen have been uncovered, one as recently as 2005. Amboli is also known for sending large number of youngsters to serve Indian Army. In Amboli, it is hard to find a house which doesn't have at least one person who is serving in Indian Army or has served Indian Army. Shahid Soldier Pandurang Mahadev Gawade was also from Amboli, who attained martyrdom while fighting five Lashkar terrorists at Drug Mulla village in Kashmir's Kupwara district on May 22, 2016, was posthumously awarded Shaurya Chakra on the eve of 68th Republic Day. Additionally, the interesting fact of the village is that many men had also served for British army in the pre-independence era.

== Transport ==
Amboli is well connected by road to the surrounding cities of Kolhapur (128 km (80 mi)), Belgaum 68 km (42 mi), and Panjim (90 km (56 mi)) by road.The nearest airport is Belgaum Airport.

== Accommodation ==
There are a few hotels at Amboli. Most of them provide hot water baths and have facilities like restaurant, room service and cab services.

== Local transport ==
The only local transport is motorised three-wheeler rickshaws and a couple of private taxis.

== Tourist attractions ==
There are in total 8 places that are listed by Maharashtra Tourism Development Corporation (MTDC). Amboli Waterfall, Hiranyakeshi (Shiv Mandir and ancient cave), Kavalesat (Reverse waterfall point), Amboli Forest, and Ganesh Kond (waterway/river).

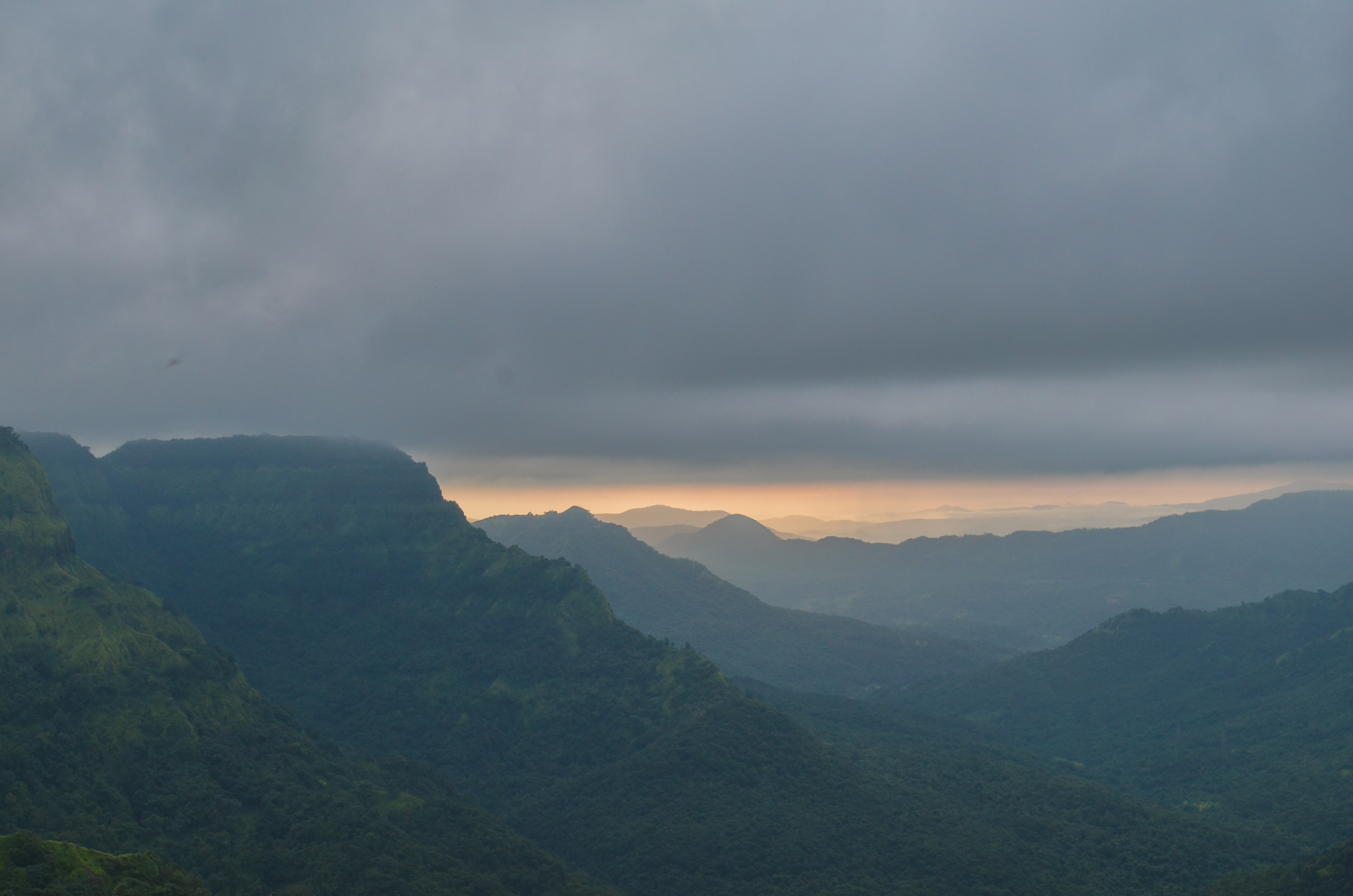
Amboli Sunset

== Nearest cities ==
- Sawantwadi — 29 km (18 mi)
- Kudal — 47 km (29 mi)
- Kolhapur — 129 km (80 mi) via the Gadhinglaj–Sankeshwar main road
- Sangli — 152 km (94 mi) via the Gadhinglaj–Chikodi–Miraj
- Belgaum — 68 km (42 mi)
- Ajara — 32 km (20 mi)
- Chandgad — 29 km (18 mi)
- Gadhinglaj — 52 km (32 mi)

== Nearest railway stations ==
- Sawantwadi Road railway station — 28 km (17 mi)
- Kudal railway station — 47 km (29 mi)
- Pernem railway station — 58 km (36 mi)
- Belagavi railway station — 70 km (43 mi)
- Chhatrapati Shahu Maharaj Terminus — 110 km (68 mi)
- Sangli railway station — 130 km (81 mi)
- Miraj Junction railway station — 140 km (87 mi)
- Madgaon Junction railway station — 140 km (87 mi)

Tourists coming from Mumbai, Goa, Delhi and trains on the Konkan railway can reach Amboli from Sawantwadi railway station. There are buses from Karnataka State Road Transport Corporation and Maharashtra State Road Transport Corporation that travel frequently between Belgaum and Sawantwadi via Amboli. Private cars are available from Sawantwadi railway station to Amboli. Buses travel to Amboli from Sangli and Kolhapur stations via Nippani–Gadhinglaj–Ajara.

== Gallery ==
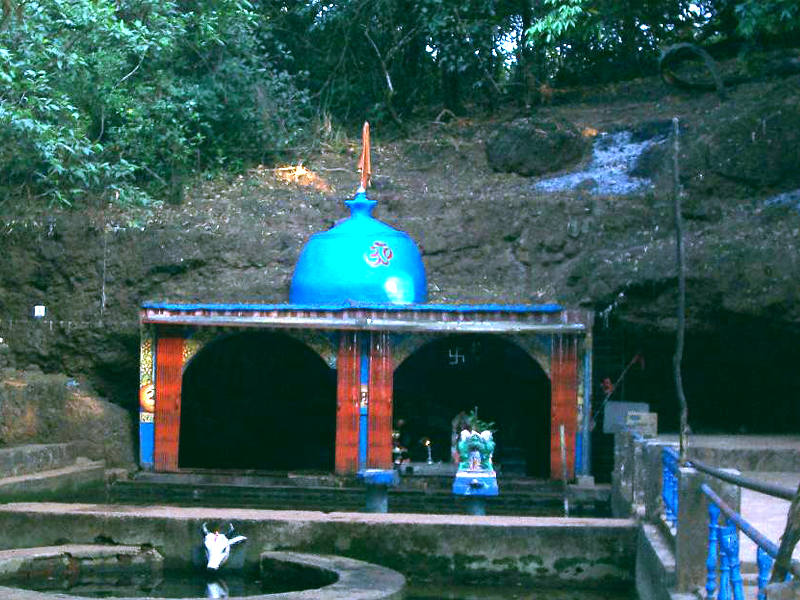

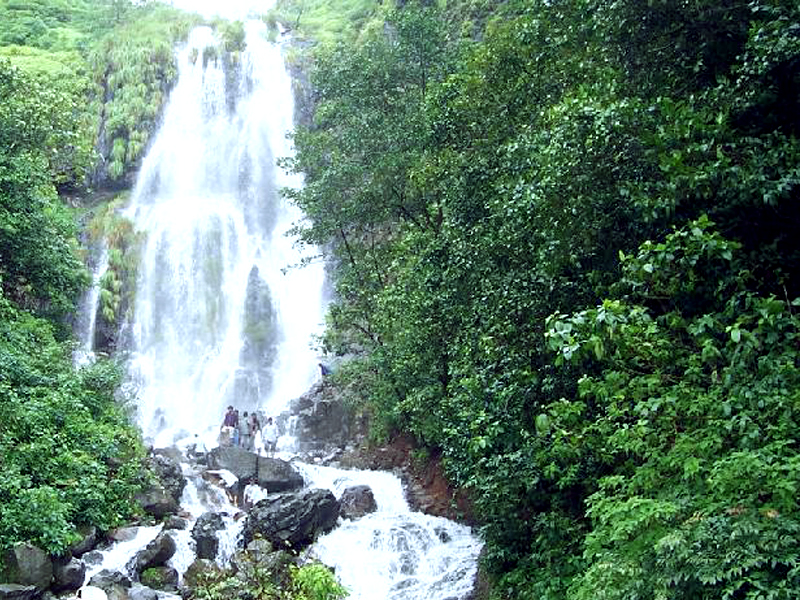

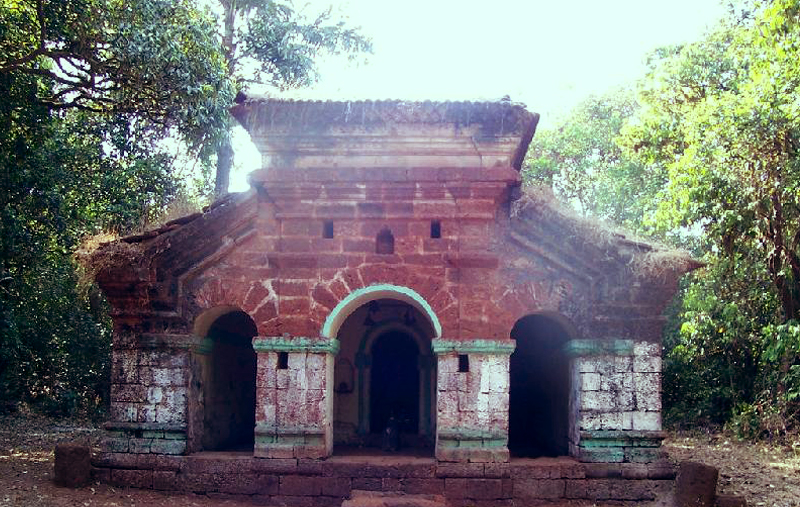

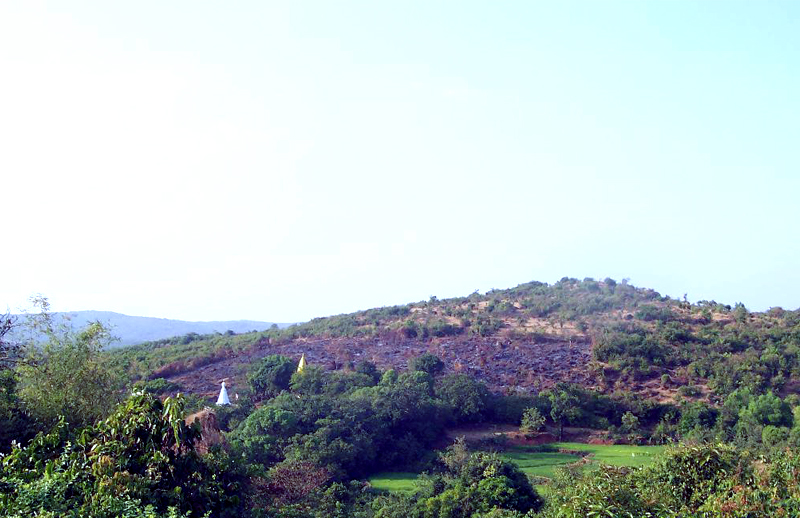

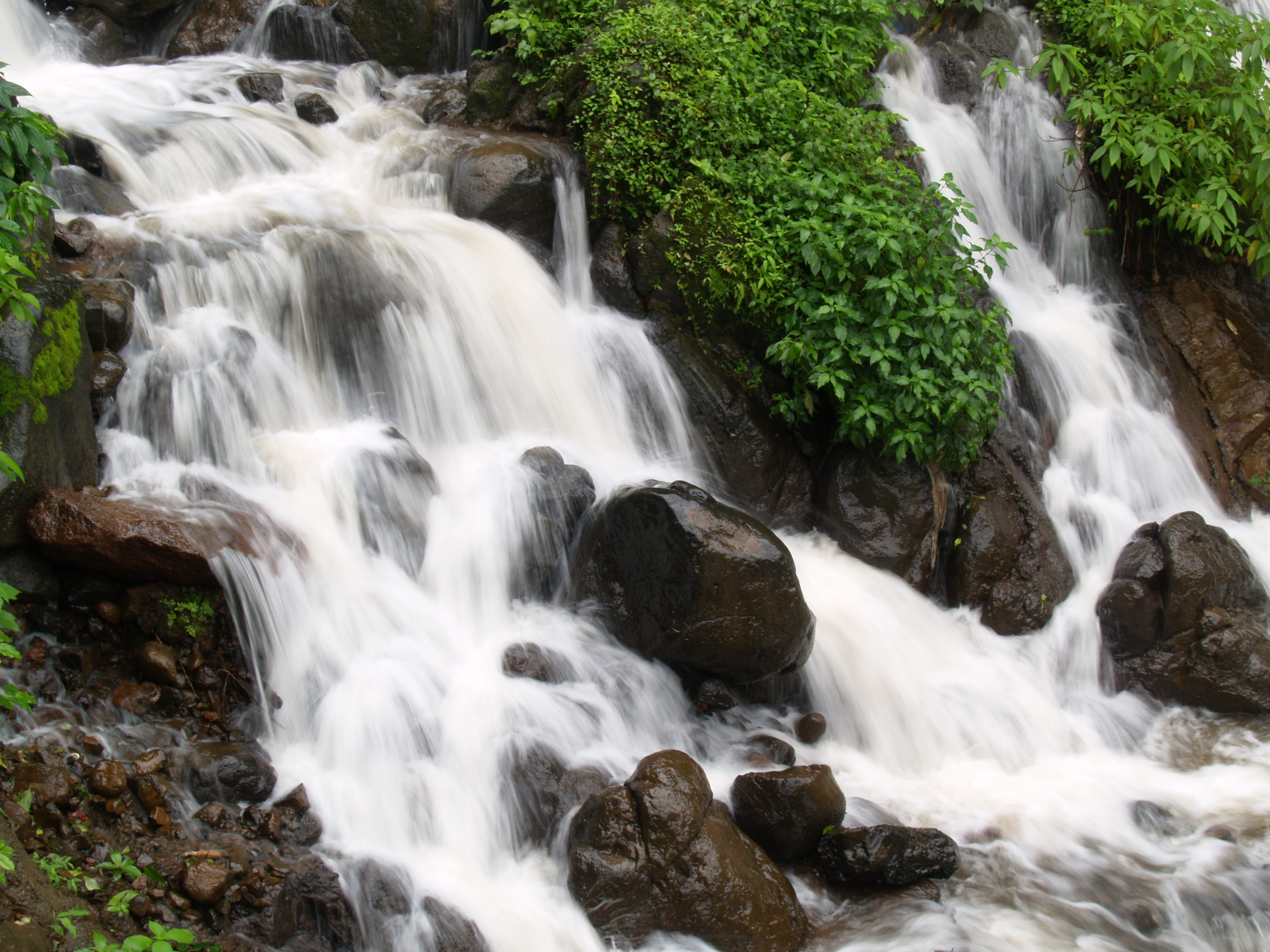
Waterfall in Amboli

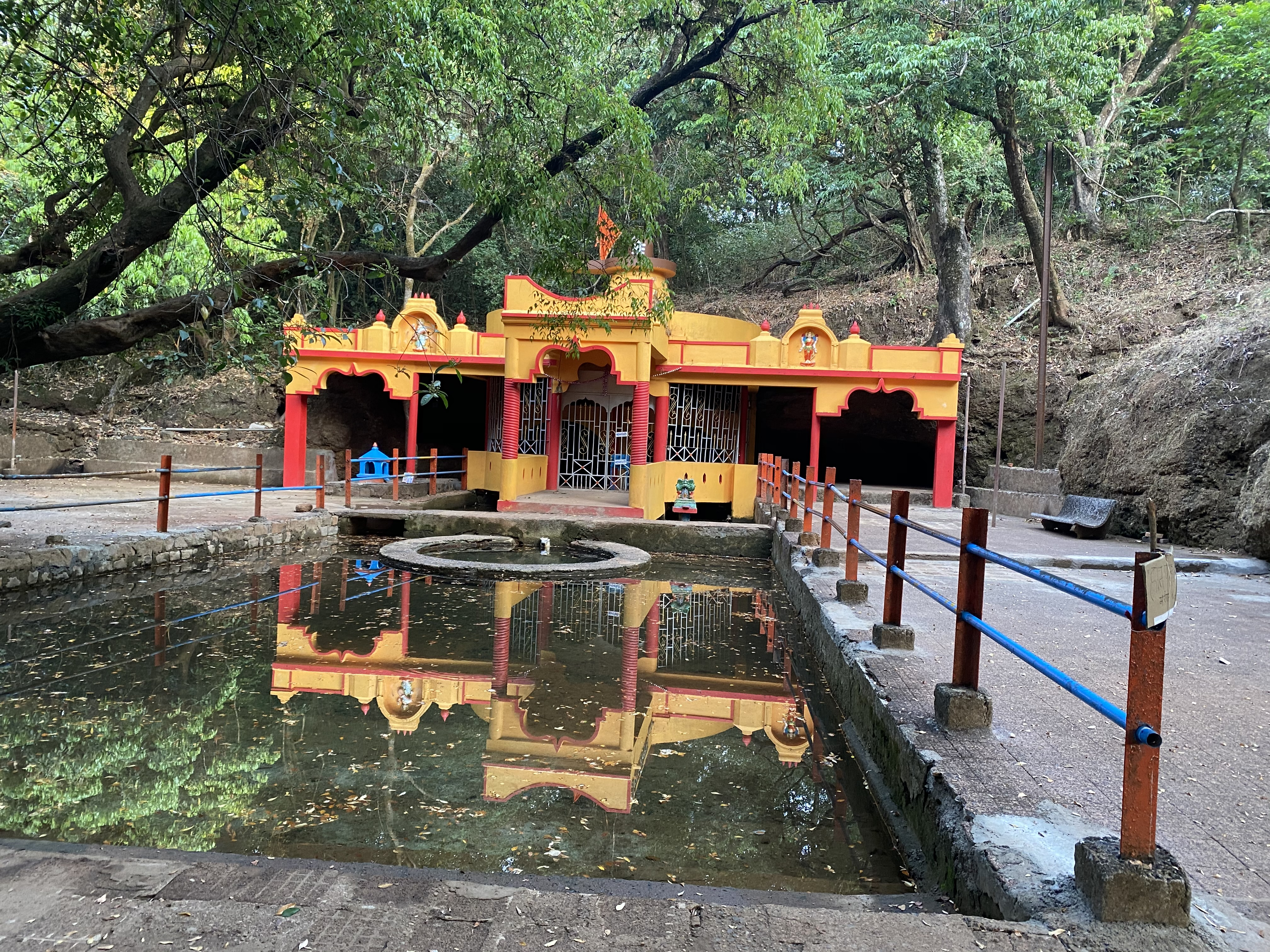
