= Sankeshwar, Karnataka =

City in Karnataka, India

Sankeshwar
- Town
- Location in Karnataka, India
- Coordinates: 16.27°N 74.48°E
- Country: India
- State: Karnataka
- District: Belagavi
- Elevation: 638 m (2,093 ft)

Population (2011)
  - Total: 89,627

Languages
  - Official: Kannada
- Time zone: UTC+5:30 (IST)
- PIN: 591313
- ISO 3166 code: IN-KA
- Vehicle registration: KA-23
- Website: www.sankeshwaratown.mrc.gov.in

Sankeshwar city located in Hukkeri taluka, Belagavi district, in Karnataka. It is located on AH47 (Previously National Highway 4). It is about 50 km north-east from Belgaum. It is located on the bank of the Hiranyakeshi river.

== Geography ==
Sankeshwar is located at 16.27°N 74.48°E. It has an average elevation of 638 metres (2093 feet).

== Demographics ==
As of 2011 India census, Sankeshwar had a population of 89,627. Males constitute 51% of the population and females 49%. Sankeshwar has an average literacy rate of 87%, higher than the national average of 59.5% (India): male literacy is 75%, and female literacy is 67%. 18% of the population is under 7 years of age. Kannada is the major language spoken here.

== Tourist attractions in Sankeshwar ==
Shri Jagadguru Shankaracharya Samsthana Matha - Sankeshwar (Karavir)

Narayan Temple

Sri Duradundeshwara Matha - Nidasoshi

Vallabhgad Fort
