= Sawantwadi taluka =

Administrative unit in Maharashtra, India

Sawantwadi
- Taluka
- Location in Maharashtra, India
- Coordinates: 16°N 73.75°E
- Country: India
- State: Maharashtra
- District: Sindhudurg
- Elevation: 111.86 m (367.0 ft)

Population (2011)
  - Total: 47,921

Languages
  - Official: Marathi
- Time zone: UTC+5:30 (IST)
- PIN: 416510
- Telephone code: 91(0)2363
- Vehicle registration: MH-07
- Website: www.sawantwadimc.org

Sawantwadi is a taluka (a unit of administration) in the Sindhudurg district in the Indian state of Maharashtra. The taluka headquarters is Sawantwadi which has a municipal council, which is a local civic body. Sawantwadi was formerly the capital of the Kingdom of Sawantwadi, ruled by the Sawant Bhonsle dynasty

== History ==
Sawantwadi was the former capital of the Kingdom of Sawantwadi during the pre-independence era. In 1947, it merged into the Dominion of India. Border issues at that time with nearby areas of Belgaum and Karwar were prevalent. There were initial plans of making it a union territory as it was a Konkani speaking area, However it was merged with the old Ratnagiri district. (The district was later divided into two districts called Ratnagiri and Sindhudurg). Until the 18th century, the Kingdom of Sawantwadi included a major portion of today's North Goa district (Pedne, Bicholim, and Sattari), as well as modern Kudal and Vengurla from today's Sindhudurg district. Pedne, Bicholim, Sattari were later taken over by the Portuguese as a part of their New Conquest (between 1765 and 1788) and merged with their Old Conquest to form Goa.

Mang Sawant was founder of Sawant Bhonsle dynasty.He was followed by Khem Sawant I in 1627. He was rewarded Jagir from the Bijapur's Adilshah and later made himself independent, followed by Lakham Sawant the first.

Pancham Khemraj alias Bapusaheb Maharaj was crowned on 29 October 1924.He had a small tenure from 1924 to 1937.He surrendered to the British Empire.

He was succeeded by his incapable son Shivramraje Bhonsale, but he being a minor at the time, Bapusaheb's wife Parvatidevi looked after the State as a Regent.Shivramraje Bhonsale converted the 18th century royal palace of Sawantwadi Royal family, into an art boutique hotel,working as a chef and receptionist there.

== Demographics ==
As of 2011, Sawantwadi had a population of 47,921, with a 50:50 ratio between males and females, based on the Indian census. Sawantwadi has an average literacy rate of 82%, higher than the national average of 59.5%: male literacy is 85%, and female literacy is 79%. In Sawantwadi, 10% of the population is under 6 years of age.

== Culture ==
=== People ===
Due to local language of Malvani, people of whole district are called Malvanis.

=== Cuisine ===
Typical households of Sawantwadi follow the norms of Malvani cuisine. On special occasions they eat Vade similar to Puris and Mutton or Chicken, Fried cakes of rice and Udid flour; puran-polis, wheat cakes staffed with gram flour and sugar; and rarely, ladus, sugared and buttered wheat balls. The food of almost all household is rice, Daal, Wheat bread, Curry, vegetables as well as sea food or meat. Besides dried fish usually bought in October, Homemade Raw Mango Pickles, Salted Raw Mangoes, stores of rice, pulse, salt, and red pepper, enough to last from 6 to 12 months, are laid in during March and April.

Sweet & Spicy Poha are special on occasions of Diwali and Patolya (पातोळया) on Nag Panchami.

=== Attire ===
Attire varies from traditional Dhoti, Navwari Sarees to Kurta and Payjama, to some extent Pants & Shirt or fashion cloths on occasional basis. In addition to the traditional attire of the city, ornaments are worn by both men and women in Sawantwadi, mainly necklaces, bracelets and earrings.

== City structure ==
According to the 1872 census, there were 221 towns and villages or about one village to every four square miles, containing an average of 840 inhabitants and about 197 houses. Of the 221 villages, 36 had less than 200 inhabitants; 57 from 200 to 500; 64 from 500 to 1,000; 41 from 1,000 to 2,000; 18 from 2,000 to 3,000; four from 3,000 to 5,000; and one, Vadi, over 8,000.

== Language ==
Malvani is the predominant spoken language in Sawantwadi. Marathi is state language, spoken widely, Goan Konkani is also understood but not implemented. Hindi and English are also used in social communication.

== Transport ==
Sawantwadi is well connected to other towns of Sindhudurg district and cities of Maharashtra state by MSRTC buses as well as Goa & Belgaum. Private buses, Sharing Rickshaws & Bikes are used to travel locally to connect the small villages to the city. Konkan Railway Corporation Limited's railway line connecting Mumbai to Mangalore, popularly known as the Konkan Railway, passes through Sawantwadi Road railway station.

Near by Railways Station: Sawantwadi Road railway station

Near by Airport: Manohar International Airport, MOPA (GOA), Belgaum & Dabolim (Goa)

The following table gives information about Sawantwadi-Mumbai train route information.

Sawantwadi Road (SWV)
Next 'Small' station towards Mumbai : Zarap	Konkan Railway : Railway (India)	Next 'Small' station from Mumbai: Madure
Next 'Small' station towards Mumbai : Zarap	Distance from Mumbai (CST) = 655 km (407 mi)	Next 'Small' station from Mumbai: Madure
Next 'Main' station towards Mumbai: Kudal	Konkan Railway : Railway (India)	Next 'Main' station from Mumbai: Madgaon

== Tourist attractions ==
Moti Talao, Hiranyakeshi and Shilpgram are located in Sawantwadi, Amboli hill station is situated at distance of 29 km (18 mi). Mahadevgad is known as Amboli point in forest, hills and valleys. Math of Satam Maharaj is at Danoli Village.

Hanumangad nearby trekking point situated in forest of village of Fukeri.

== Other ==
Developing Market Town Banda is situated 12 km (7.5 mi) south of Sawantwadi.

== Notable people ==
- Ashok Patki – composer
- V. S. Khandekar – novelist
- Mangesh Padgaonkar – poet
- Vijay Manjrekar – cricketer
- Sanjay Manjrekar – cricketer
- Vasant Desai – composer

== Photo gallery ==
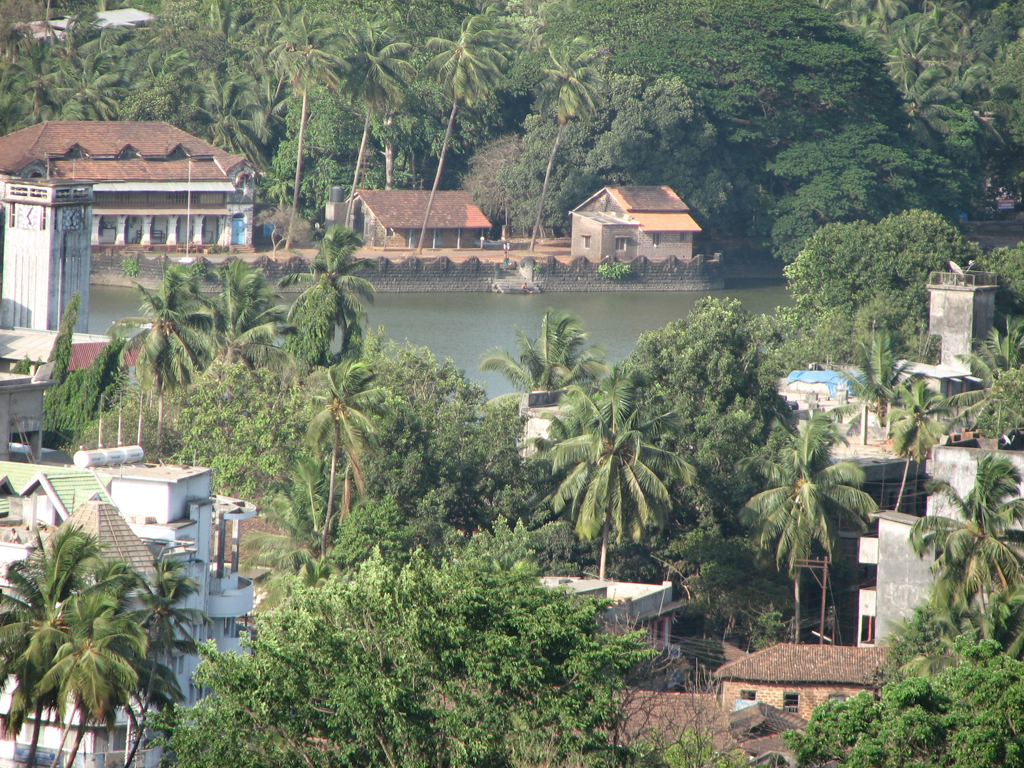
Sawantwadi

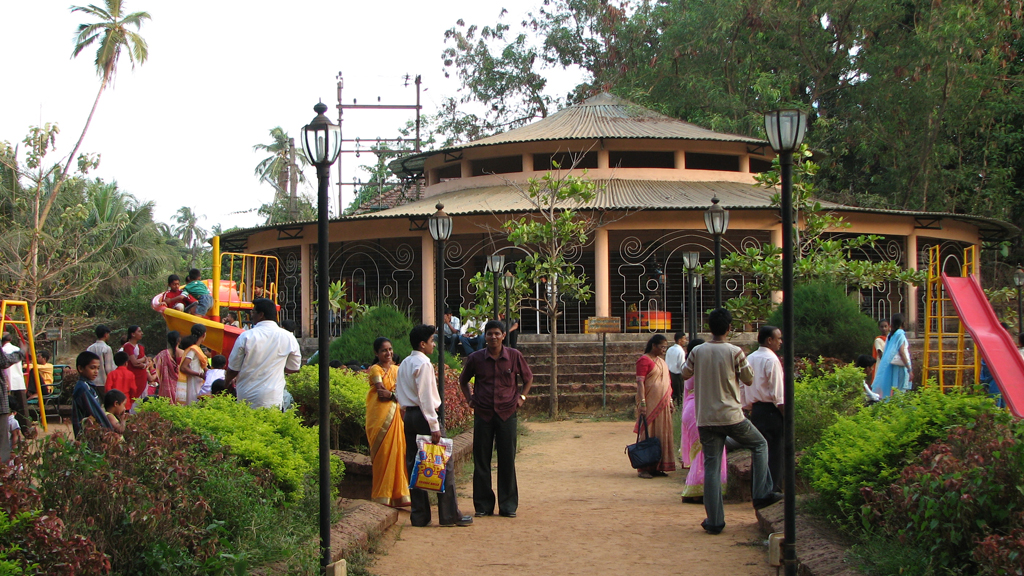
Garden

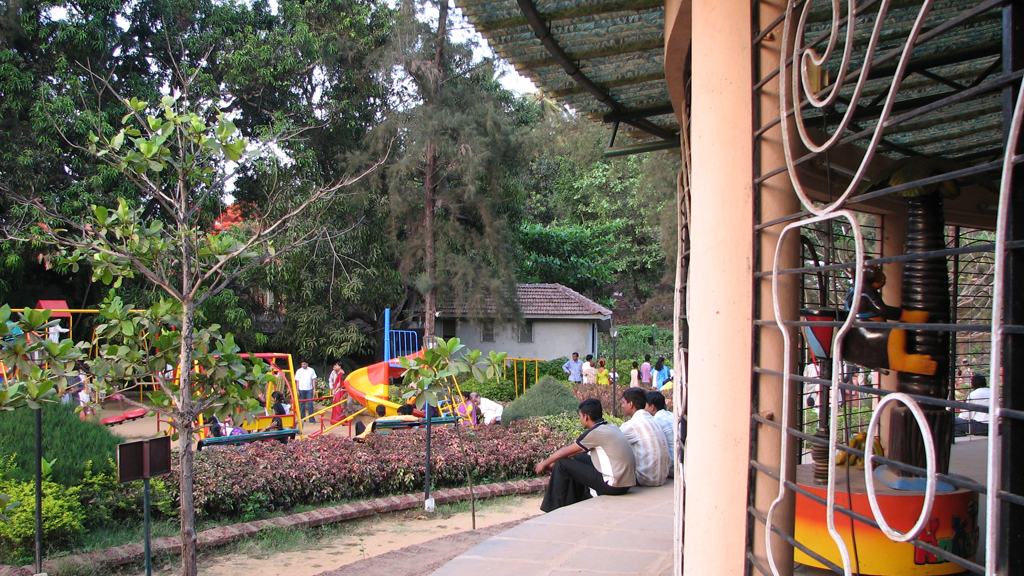
Garden

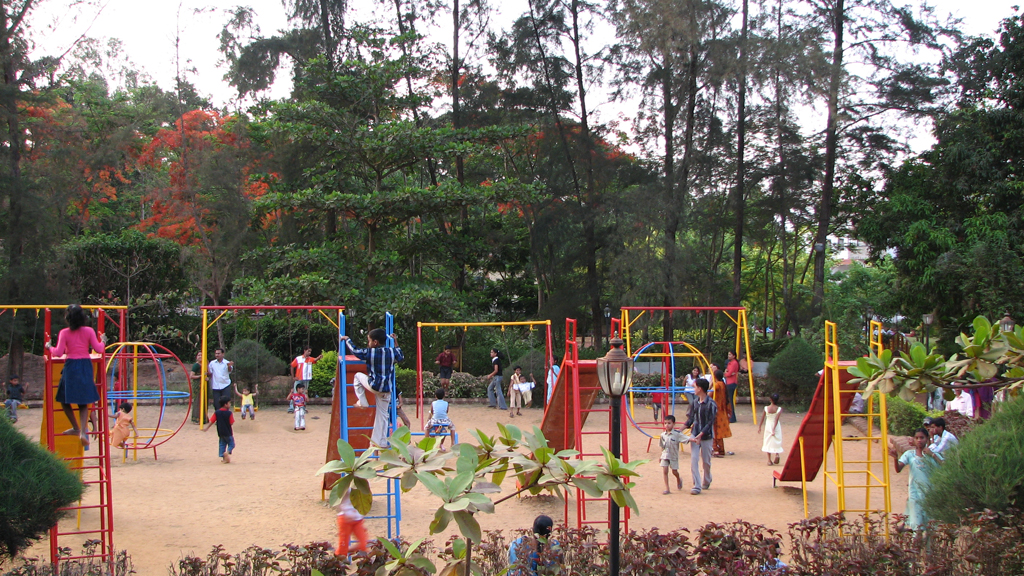
Playground.

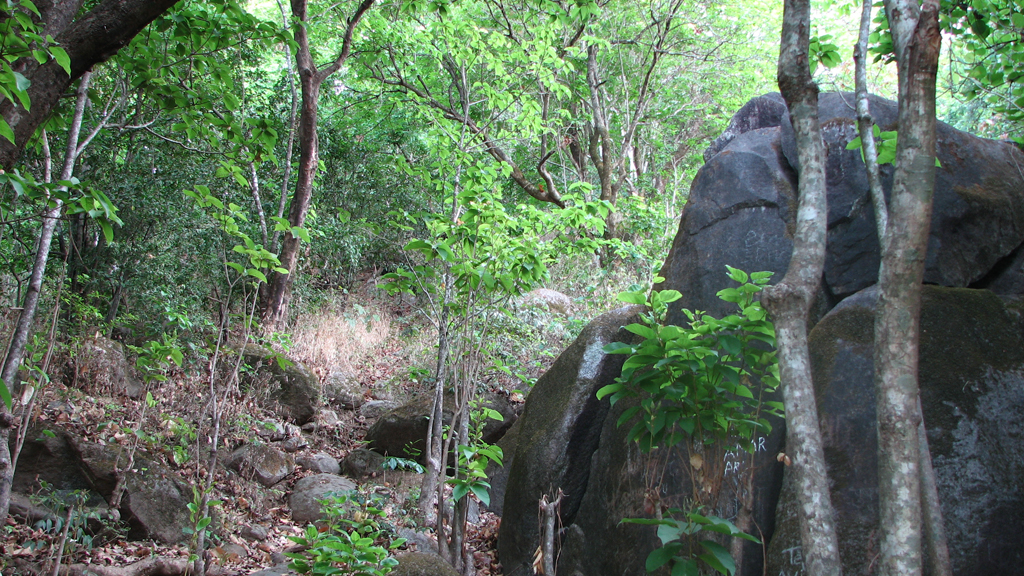
Rocks on Narendra Hill

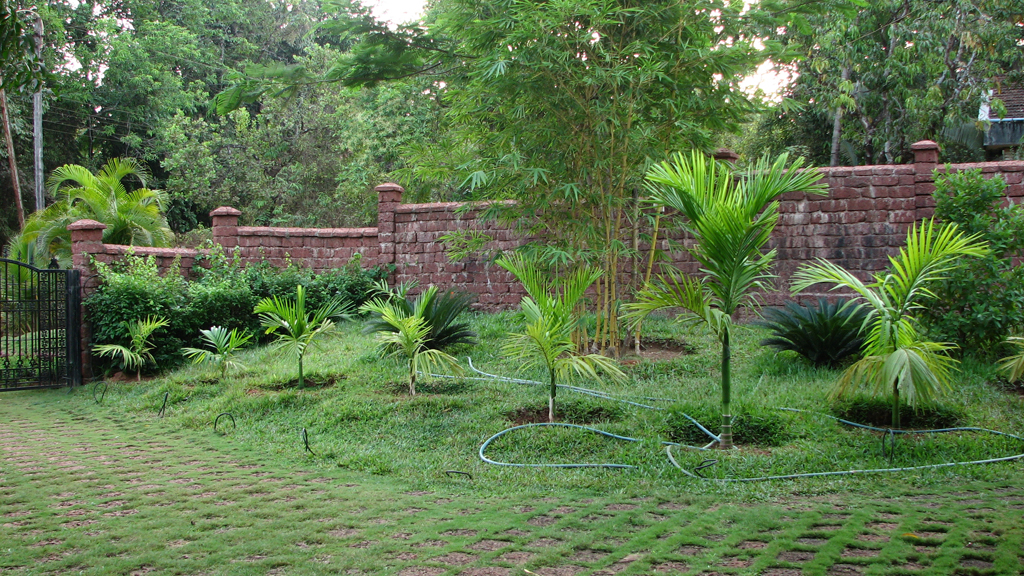
Inside the Shilpgram

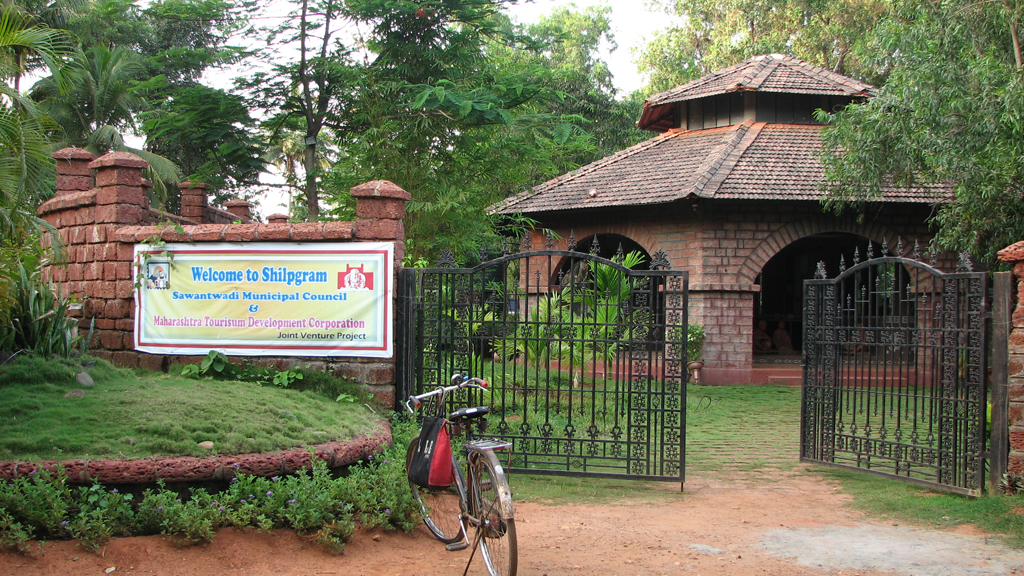
Main Entrance of Shilpgram

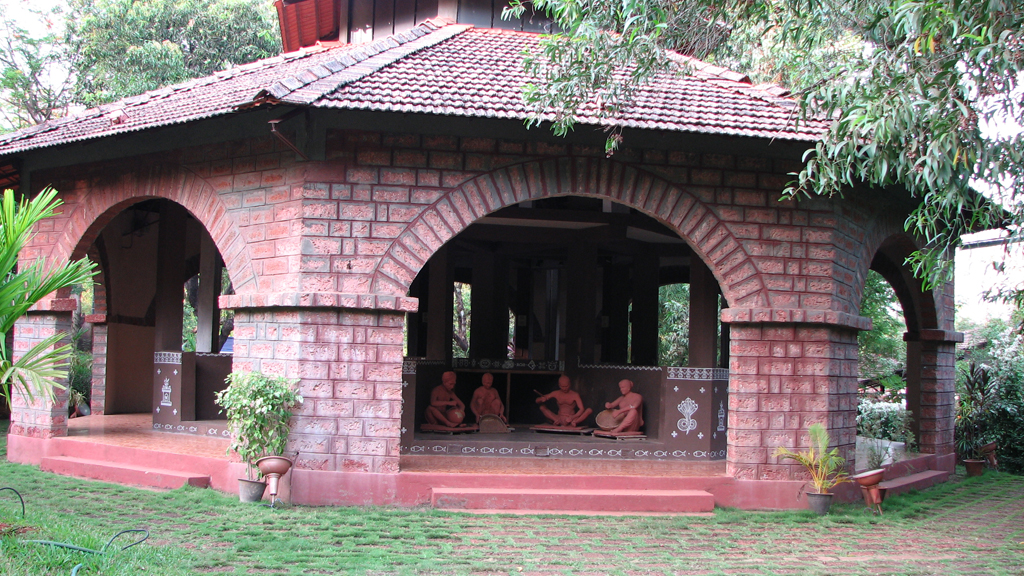
Shilpagram

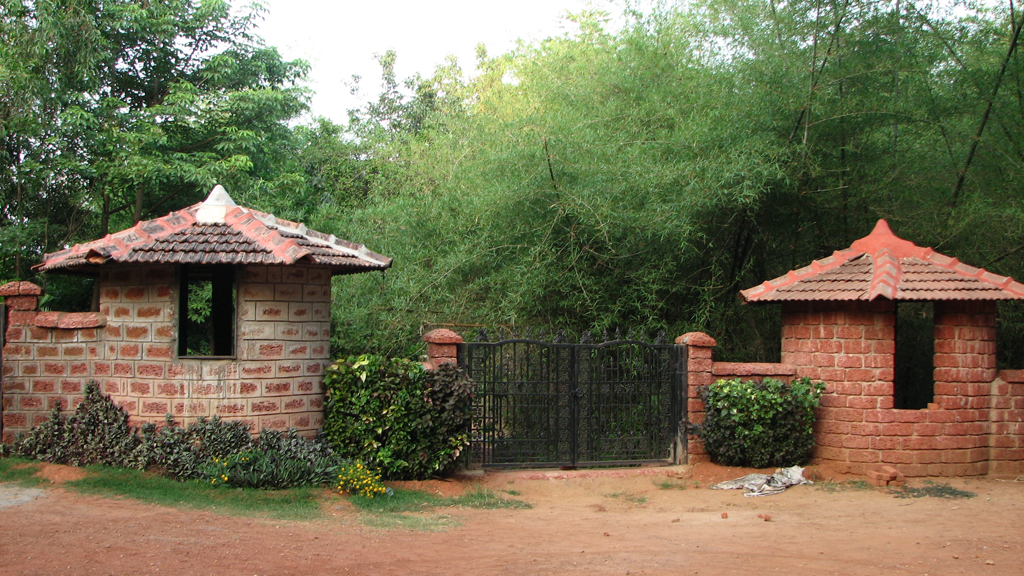
Entrance

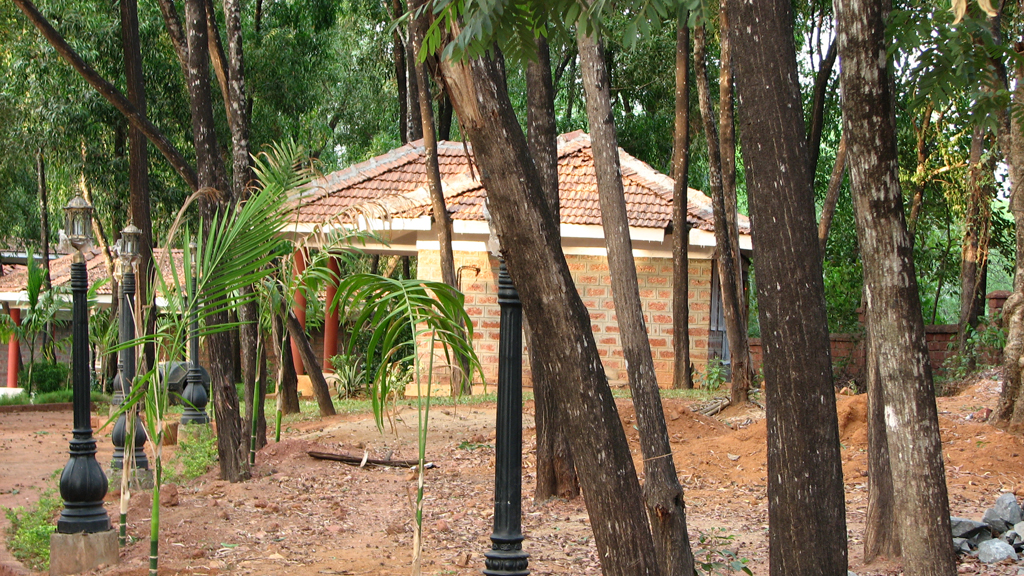
Tourist Residential Quarters in Sawantwadi

== See also ==
- Sawantwadi
- Sawantwadi State
- Sawantwadi toys
- Sawantwadi Road railway station
- Bhonsle
- Maratha
- Maratha Empire
- List of Maratha dynasties and states
