= Ajara, India =

Ajara
- Town
- Location in Maharashtra, India
- Coordinates: 16.12°N 74.2°E
- Country: India
- State: Maharashtra
- District: Kolhapur

Government
  - Body: Nagar Panchayat
- Elevation: 660 m (2,170 ft)

Population (2011)
  - Total: 18,000

Languages
  - Official: Marathi
- Time zone: UTC+5:30 (IST)
- PIN: 416505
- ISO 3166 code: IN-MH
- Website: maharashtra.gov.in

Ajara is a census town and the headquarters of Ajara Taluka in the Kolhapur district of Maharashtra, India. It is a developing city with a Nagar Panchayat (municipal council).

Ajara is mainly known for its Ajara Ghansal Tandul rice. Two rivers flow through the town, the Chitra and the Hiranyakeshi. Ramtirth, a site where Rama, Lakshmana, and Sita are believed to have stayed during their 14-year vanvas (exile), is located here.

== Geography ==
Ajara is located at 16.12°N 74.2°E, with an average elevation of 660 m (2,170 ft). It is known for its scenic, green landscape.

Ajara is 84 km from Kolhapur and 33 km from the Amboli Hill station. The nearest major city is Gadhinglaj. Ite is a village in Ajara.

== Demographics ==
As of 2011, Ajara had a population of 18,000, with males comprising 51% of the population and females 49%. The town has an average literacy rate of 75%, higher than the national average of 59.5%; male literacy is 55%, while female literacy is 45%. Twelve percent of the population is under 6 years of age. Marathi is the predominant language spoken in the town.

== Geographical indication ==
Ajara Ghansal rice was awarded the Geographical Indication (GI) status tag from the Geographical Indications Registry under the Union Government of India on 31 March 2016 (valid until 25 March 2034).

Ajara Taluka Shetkari Vikas Mandal from Ajara, proposed the GI registration of Ajara Ghansal rice. After filing the application in March 2014, the chilli was granted the GI tag in 2016 by the Geographical Indication Registry in Chennai, making the name "Ajara Ghansal rice" exclusive to the rice grown in the region. It thus became the first rice variety from Maharashtra and the 11th type of goods from Maharashtra to earn the GI tag.

== Villages ==
- Pedrewadi
- Medhewadi

== Notable people ==
- Shivaji Sawant, writer
