= Benadi =

- Village
- Location in Karnataka, India Benadi (India)
- Coordinates: 16.42°N 74.58°E
- Country: India
- State: Karnataka
- District: Belgaum
- Talukas: Chikodi

Population (2001)
  - Total: 5,882

Languages
  - Official: Kannada
- Time zone: UTC+5:30 (IST)
- PIN: 591215
- Telephone code: 0833
- Vehicle registration: KA-23
- Nearest city: Nipani, Sangli and Kolhapur
- Sex ratio: 1000:941 ♂/♀
- Vidhan Sabha constituency: Nipani, Jolle Shashikala Annasaheb-MLA [BJP]
- Climate: Dry (Köppen)

Benadi is a village in the North-Western region of Karnataka state near Maharashtra Border in India. It is located in the Chikodi taluka of the Belgaum district in Karnataka. Before it was a part of Bombay State and Princely state of Kolhapur. It is a part of Twin Village Aadi-Benadi. People who originate from this village are known as Benadikar.

== Demographics ==
As of 2001 India census, Benadi had a population of 5,882, with 3,030 males and 2,852 females. The main language is Kannada, but Marathi is also spoken widely. Benadi is located at 15 km from Nipani and 35 km from Kolhapur.

== Geography ==
Benadi is located near the Western Ghats and has on one side the Vedganga and Dudhganga rivers and hills on the other side.

There is an old temple of Siddheshwar in front of a lake in Benadi, and a temple to Basaveshwar in the village. The nearest city, Kolhapur, is 25 miles away and connected by road, rail and air.

Benadi has primary schools and Higher Secondary Colleges located within it, including both Marathi and Kannada-language schools. The Marathi High School, established in the pre-independence period is located in Benadi. This High School is now also a Higher Secondary College, which is named after Anandrao Patil, a social worker from Benadi.

There is also government hospital in Benadi.

== Notable people ==
- Gulabrao Patil, Marathi film director
- Dinkar D. Patil
