= Panchganga River =

Panchganga
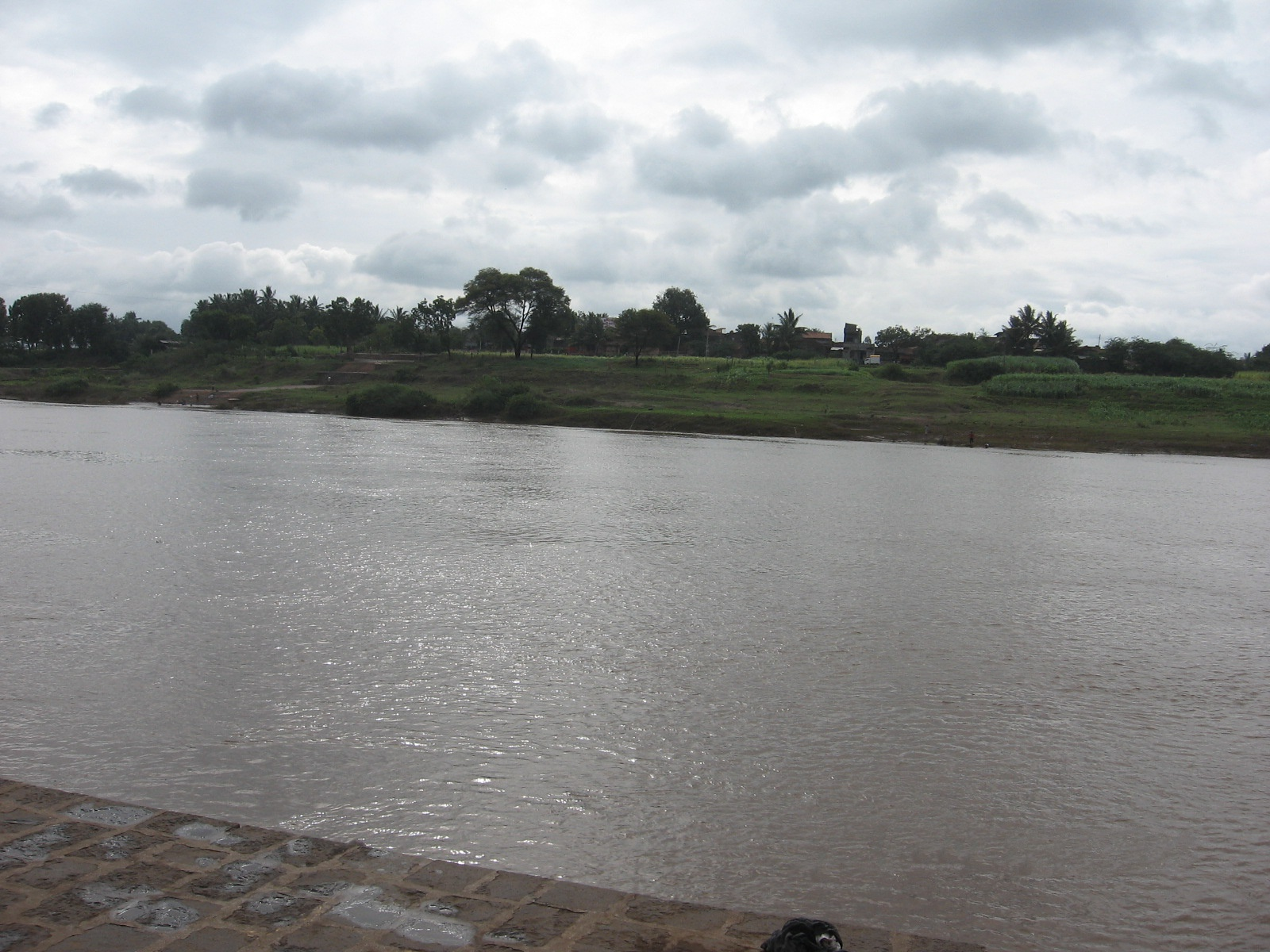
- The Panchganga River at Narsobawadi
- Etymology: Five rivers

Location
- Country: India
- State: Maharashtra
- Cities: Kolhapur, Ichalkaranji, Kurundvad

Physical characteristics
- Source: Prayag Sangam
  - location: Padali Bk., India
  - coordinates: 16°44′4″N 74°10′33″E
- Mouth: Narsobawadi
  - location: Narsobawadi, India
  - coordinates: 16°31′22″N 74°36′3″E
- Length: 80.7 km (50.1 mi)

The Panchganga River is one of the important rivers of India located in Maharashtra. In English, the name translates as "Five Rivers". It is a major tributary of Krishna River, which it flows into at Narsobawadi.

== Origin ==
The Panchganga River of Maharastra flows through the borders of Kolhapur. It starts from Prayag Sangam (Village: Padali BK., Taluka: Karvir, Dist:Kolhapur). The Panchganga is formed, as has been noted already, by four streams, the Kasari, the Kumbhi, the Tulsi and the Bhogawati. Local tradition believes in an underground stream Saraswati which together with the other four streams make the Panchganga.

The Prayag Sangam confluence marks the beginning of the Panchganga river proper which after receiving the waters of the four tributaries continues in a larger pattern with the flow of waters received from the rivers. From north of Kolhapur it has a wide alluvial plain. After developing this plain the river resumes its course eastwards.

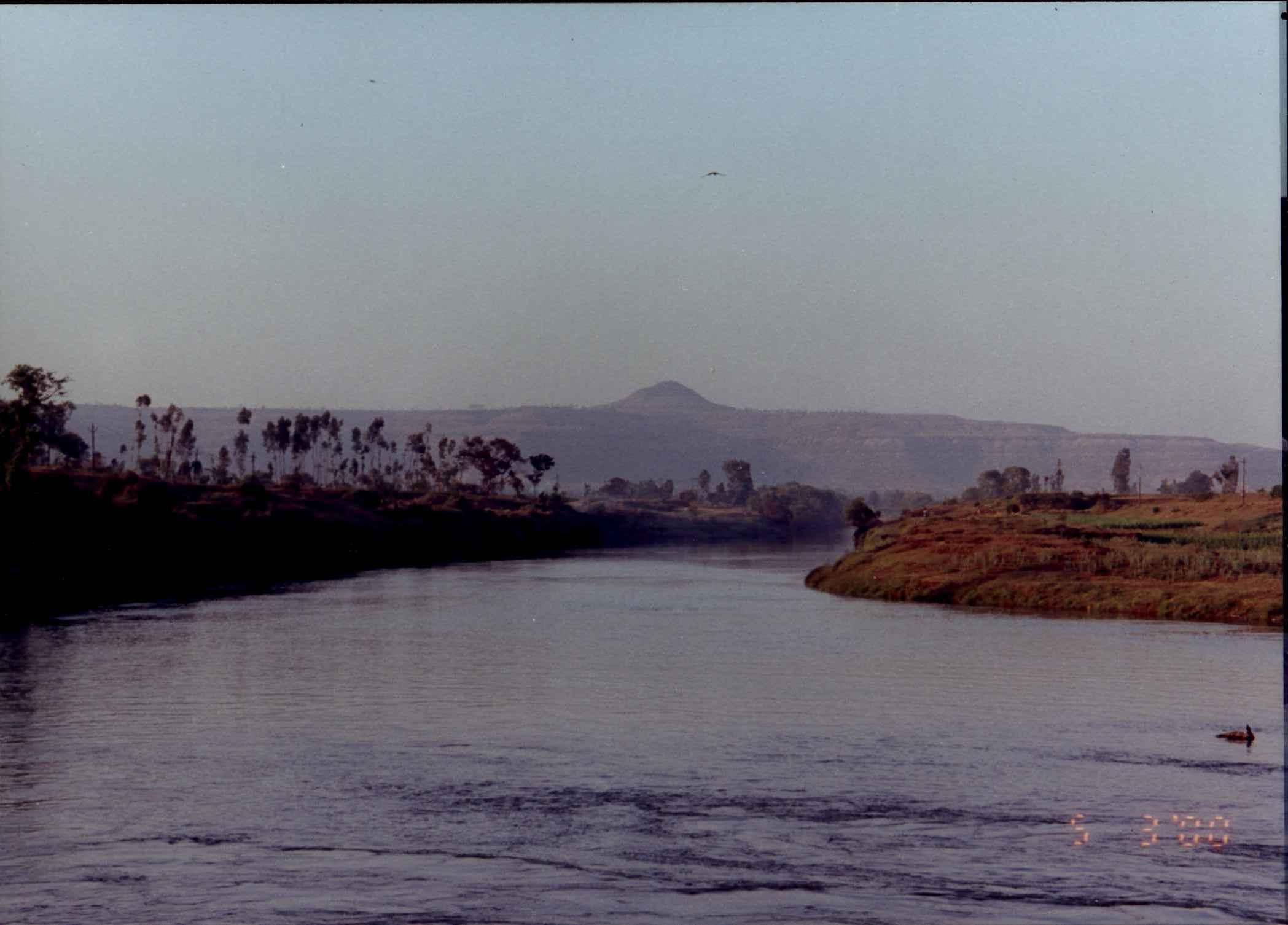
Panchganga River At Kolhapur

== Course ==
From Kolhapur the Panchganga River, as the river is now called, winds east about thirty miles till it falls into the Krishna at Kurundvad. In the thirty miles of its course, to the east of Kolhapur the Panchganga River receives only one considerable stream the Hatkalangale or Kabnur which, rising from the Alta hills and passing Hatkalangale and Korochi joins the Panchganga near Kabnur about fifteen miles below Kolhapur.

From Shiroli to its junction with the Krishna near Narsobawadi, it has an extensive Alaviya floor bordered by the large worn out stumps of the Alta portion of the Panhala in the north and the Hupari part of the Phonda Sangaon range in the south. A characteristic feature of this basin is the contrast between the rounded worn out features locally known as Mals and the general entrenched nature of all the streams.

A further noteworthy aspect is the deeply incised course of the Panchganga itself. From Mangaon, the river flows in a deep bed that is well below 40 feet from the surrounding plain. Further downstream it develops an incised meander-core which includes the Narsobawadi area.

The valley of the Panchganga is reckoned the most fertile in Kolhapur and is famous for its hay. The bed of the river is shallow and its sloping banks yield rich crops during the cold weather. At Kolhapur the Panchganga is crossed by two beautiful bridges one near the Brahmapuri hill on the north side of Kolhapur town on the road leading to the Amba pass, and the other a few miles to the east on the Poona road. The Panchgnaga and its feeders are fordable in the hot season. In the rainy season large and small boats ply at twenty-three fords.

The waters of all the streams which join to form the Panchganga are much used for growing sugarcane. In October, towards the close of the south-west rains, a series of fair-weather earthen dams are built across the river beds and the water is raised by lifts worked by bullocks.

== Tributaries ==
=== Kasari River ===
The Kasari is an important stream. It rises in the Sahyadris near the village of Gajapur in Malkapur and flows south-east up to Dhangarwadi for about 10 miles and then eastwards for another 25 miles till it joins the united waters of the Kumbhi and the Tulsi at Padali about three miles west of Kolhapur. During its course, the Kasari River receives several minor streams of which the chief streams are the Jambhli River and the Gadavli River.

The Kasari River stream is wide and receives its source waters from a fairly large triangular area lying between watersheds of the Vishalgad range in the north and the Waghajai in the south. Just above Bhogaon village, the river receives another important southern tributary called Mangari River. Below Bhogaon village it develops into a wide alluvial plain in which the river has developed meanders.

=== Kumbhi River ===
The Kumbhi River rises near Gaganbavada And flows north-eastwards for about fifteen miles up to Kirwai. From there it flows eastwards with a winding course and receives an important tributary Dhamani, near Chaugalewadi. It then develops wide basin underlain by alluvium. North-east of Sangrul it has a sharp bend eastwards after which it meets the united Tulsi and Bhogavati river near Bahireshwar about eight miles south-west of Kolhapur.

=== Tulsi River ===
The Tulsi River rises about five miles east of the Kumbhi and dammed at Dhamod (Radhanagari) and after a north-easterly course of about fifteen miles falls into the Bhogavati at Beed, about eight miles south-west of Kolhapur.

=== Bhogwati River ===
The Bhogwati River is the chief of the four streams and takes its rise in the Sahyadris, a few miles from the Phonda Pass and after a northerly course of about 25 miles is joined by the Tulsi near the historical village of Beed.

The source waters of the Bhogwati river have now been impounded to form the Radhanagari Dam for the purposes of both irrigation and hydro-electricity. Unlike the northern tributary streams of the Panchganga river the Bhogwati has a wide alluvial floor particularly below Fejivade. Below this village the river develops considerable meanders and a fairly entrenched course in its middle reaches. In the lower reaches the valley floor widens to a still larger extent.

About two miles north-west of Beed the Bhogavati receives the Kumbhi River and about eight miles further north they are joined from the left by the Kasari River about three miles west of Kolhapur.

After its junction with the Tulsi River and the Kumbhi River the valley floor is four to five miles wide. Here it is bordered by low residual hills and joined by several small tributary streams. About four miles north-west of the Kolhapur city, the Bhogavati effects with the Kasari its junction at Prayag Sangam, where the Panchganga River starts.

=== Saraswati ===
Two small streams, the Jayanti or Jiti and the Gomati, join this river near Kolhapur. They do not flow all the year round, but they are held sacred and are mentioned in the local holy books. The Jiti is crossed near Kolhapur by three costly and ornamental bridges.

== Places and Temples ==
The Prayag Sangam confluence which is the meeting of the Bhogavati and Kasari marks the beginning of the Panchganga river has much local sanctity, being like Allahabad known as Prayag or Triveni, and being visited by large numbers of pilgrims during the cold months.

Near Ichalkaranji where there are many textile processing house which had discharged their effluents without treating those. Eichhornia crassipes has grown on the river nearby Ichalkaranji. Not much efforts were taken by the local government bodies to control the growth of it; in monsoon, the water level rises and it is washed out and seen nowhere until November; in December. it starts to grow again and by April the river is covered by it.

== Dams ==
Radhanagari dam is one of the major dam on its tributaries (Bhogavati river). Other dams include Kalammawadi Dam, Kode budruk dam, Tulashi dam, etc.
