= Savarde =

Village in Maharashtra

- Village
- Interactive map of Savarde
- Coordinates: 16.265953°N 73.987124°E
- Country: India
- State: Maharashtra
- District: Kolhapur
- Tehsil: Radhanagari

Area
  - Total: 103.80 km^{2} (40.08 sq mi)

Population
  - Total: 2,345
  - Density: 22.59/km^{2} (58.51/sq mi)

Languages
  - Official: Marathi
- Time zone: UTC+5:30 (IST)
- PIN: 416210
- Website: https://savarde-tourism.appspot.com

Savarde is a small village situated in the southwest corner of Maharashtra, India along the banks of Dudhaganga River. The population of Savarde was approximately 2,345 as per the 2011 census. As it is in the Maharashtra state, the main language spoken here is Marathi. Blessed by divine power of the goddess kalamma which is also symbol of Unity in integrity for all casts.

== Location ==
Savarde (सावर्दे) is located in southwestern Maharashtra and outskirts of Konkan and Kolhapur district. Its climate is usually pleasant. By road, Savarde is 80.4 km south of Kolhapur. The nearest cities and towns within Maharashtra are Kadgaon(12 km), Gargoti (29 km), Kolhapur (60 km).

This village is now reaping its educational mark by eliminating the backwardness of the village. The village has a standard of education up to VII and needs to go out for further education. Nevertheless, the educational progress of the village has been very good and many youths in the village are working in many areas with the status of a youth.

This village can be developed as a tourist destination if it needs proper development. This village is characterized by the tigers, gaur (Indian bison), deer, rabbit, etc. This village is famous for the nearby Dajipur wildlife sanctuary. The main attraction in the sanctuary is the gaur (Indian bison).

== Climate ==
The climate in Savarde is a blend of coastal and inland climate of Maharashtra. The temperature has a relatively narrow range between 10 °C to 35 °C. Summer in Savarde is comparatively cooler, but much more humid, compared to neighboring inland cities. Maximum temperatures rarely exceed 38 °C and typically range between 33 and 35 °C. Lows during this season are around 24 °C to 26 °C.

== Culture ==
There are five temples in the village. Also known as the pilgrimage area, the Waknath and Ramling Temple is situated to the east of the village. Although there are many religious people living in the village, the village has an atmosphere of religious harmony and brotherhood. Most of the villagers depends on farming. Main crops are sugarcane, rice, nachani (also called Eleusine coracana).

This village is found in the beautiful dialect of Malvani and indigenous languages in the dialect of Konkan and country. There are folk songs like lezim, danpatta as well as bharudi and jat

== History ==
Savarde has a very ancient history. The Shahu Maharaj used to go there for hunting. In the middle of the village, Jinji Mahal stands on a message of social equality raised by Shahu Maharaj. The Navadurga Temple, located at this place, is a historic landmark of the history of Shiva.

== Tourism ==
As it is on the border of Radhanagari Wildlife Sanctuary, this is one of the best points considered for bird watching. Birds Monitoring for Radhanagari Wildlife Sanctuary has registered 235 species of birds of paradise. The main birds found here are great hornbill (a very rare species), the Nilgiri wood pigeon and three types of vulture.

=== Places to see ===
1. Radhanagari Wildlife Sanctuary - 1 km
2. Ramling Mandir - 0 km
3. Kalammadevi Mandir - 15 km
4. Vakoba/Vaknath Mandir - 8 km
5. Dudhaganga River Origin - 16 km
6. Many waterfalls (Available in rainy season and then after 2–3 months)
7. Doodhganga Sagar backwater -5 km
