= Rukadi =

Village in Maharashtra

Coordinates: 16°43′N 74°21′E

Rukadi रुकडी
- Village
- Interactive map of Rukadi
- District: Kolhapur

Rukadi is a village in Kolhapur district of the Indian state of Maharashtra. It is situated near Kolhapur-Sangli Highway about 413 kilometres (250 mi) from Mumbai, 19 km from Kolhapur, 11 km from Hatkanangle, 37 km from Sangli and 11 km from Ichalkaranji. Ex MP of Lok Sabha Balasaheb Mane was from Rukadi.

Panchganga river flows near Rukadi, which provides water to the village for drinking and irrigation.

== Demographics ==
In 2023, the population is about 32,000.

== Infrastructure ==
KMT(City Bus) and private rickshaws provide road transit.

Rukadi railway station provides service to this village people.

In December 2016, a new Sewage Treatment Plant was announced for Rukadi.
