= Dinkar D. Patil =

Indian film director and writer

- Born: 6 November 1915; Benadi, Bombay State, India
- Died: 23 October 2005 (aged 89); Kolhapur, India
- Occupations: Film director; script writer
- Years active: 1948–1993

Dinkar D. Patil (1915–2005) was a prominent Marathi film director, scriptwriter, and dialogue writer during the Golden Era (1950–1990) of the Marathi cinema. He directed, and wrote scripts and dialogue for more than 60 Marathi films. He also directed two Hindi films – Mandir and Gharbar. He wrote his famous autobiography titled as Patlache Por. The V. Shantaram Lifetime Achievement Award was bestowed on him by the Government of Maharashtra.

== Early life ==
Dinkar Patil was born in a Maratha Patil family on 6 November 1915 in the village of Benadi near Kolhapur. From his childhood he was interested in Marathi stage shows, Marathi plays and cinema. He studied in Kolhapur and completed his B.A. in literature from Rajaram College in Kolhapur. He was the Editor of college magazine " The Rajaramian". He also used to write articles in the Kirloskar magazine.

== Career in films ==
Dinkar Patil had an illustrious career as a filmmaker for almost five decades from the 1950s to the 1990s. He started his film career doing assistant job in the Maharashtra Film Company owned by Baburao Painter at Kolhapur, and eventually became an assistant director to Master Vinayak and later transitioned into a film director. He directed and wrote scripts for more than 60 Marathi films. He was one of the early filmmakers to realise the importance of the film medium as an instrument of social change and used it successfully to advocate socialism from his films.

Dinkar Patil was a veteran script, dialogue writer and director of Marathi films during Golden era of Marathi cinema. His films depicting rural life with rural themes, he was considered an authority in both script writing and also directing. The script and dialogue of Marathi film with rural theme Jay Malhar were written by Dinkar Patil who later continued in the industry for more than 40 years. He wrote script and dialogue for 62 films and directed 35 films including two Hindi films, Mandir and Gharbar.

Dinkar Patil introduced Marathi Lavani folk dance in his films, which made his films more popular. He was closely related to Jayaprabha and Shalini Studio in Kolhapur. Also, he made valuable efforts in establishing Marathi Film City – Chitranagari in Kolhapur.

== UP's and Down's ==
Patil worked closely with leading film makers and artists such as Master Vinayak, Bhalji Pendharkar, V. Shantaram, Narayan Hari Apte, Lata Mangeshkar, Vekatesh Madgulukar, Chandrakant and Suryakant Mandhare etc. During his long span and career, Patil faced a number of difficulties. Under the burden of a huge loan, he once had to declare insolvency. However, he continued writing and directing films which later gave him both money and reputation. Being inspired by Master Vinayak, the pioneer actor and director in Indian cinema and who was also teacher during Patil's school days, later on Dinkar Patil dedicated himself to the career in Marathi films. He also respected Bhalji Pendharkar as his Guru, particularly in script writing.

Director Dinkar Patil gave Jayshree Gadkar a break in a small role and dance in his Marathi Movie "Disat Tasa Nasat", with Raja Gosavi. This paved her way into mainstream Marathi cinema.

He also directed documentary films for the Government of Maharashtra including Co-operative Parishad held in Pune under chairmanship of Cooperative leader of Maharshtra- Gulabrao Patil, who was his cousin brother.

== Literature ==
Patil wrote scripts for more than 60 films. He used to write about rural and urban lifestyles in India, which he incorporated into his films. He has written an autobiography named after one of his films Patlache Por in which he has elaborately narrated his career in films and varied experiences in his true life. This famous autobiography titled as Patlache Por was published in 1984 in Marathi. More than 10,000 copies were sold during initial years after publication and now it is translated in many other Indian Languages.

== Later life ==
Despite his advanced age, he completed a film on Maharani Tara Rani (daughter-in-law of Shivaji) and wrote the dialogue for a Shayadri Television serial on Shahu Maharaja, the social reformer and ruler of the erstwhile Kolhapur Princely state.

He lived in Mumbai for most of his life but returned to Kolhapur with a desire to spend the last years of his life there. Due to attachment to the studios in Kolhapur namely Jayaprabha and Shalini, he reportedly expressed his last desire to immerse his ashes on the premises of the two studios namely Jayaprabha and Shalini Studio in Kolhapur as he was closely attached throughout his life. He died in 2005 at the age of 90 in Kolhapur.

He had three sons and five daughters.

== Filmography ==
List of films directed by Dinkar D. Patil from 1948 to 1993 in descending order:

- Shivrayachi Soon Tararani 1993
- Soona Ani Mona 1992
- Bhatak Bhavani 1987
- Bhamta 1982
- Sulakshana 1985
- Kunkwacha Tila 1981
- Mantryachi Soon 1980
- Savat 1980
- Sulavarchi Poli 1980
- Soonbai Ooti Bharun Jaa 1979
- Kunku Maze Bhagyache 1972
- Meehi Manoosach Aahe 1971
- Kaali Baiko 1970
- Courtachi Payri 1970
- Dhanya Te Santaji Dhanaji 1968
- Suranga Mhantyat Mala 1967
- Malhari Martand 1965
- Kamapurta Mama 1965
- Te Mazhe Gar 1963
- Prem Aandhale Aste 1962
- Vardakshina 1962
- Baap Majha Brahmachari 1962
- Majhi Aai 1961
- Vardakshina 1960
- Bhairavi 1960
- Umaj Padel Tar 1960
- shikleli Baiko 1959
- Dev Jaaga Aahe 1957
- Navra Mhanu Naye Apula 1957
- Diste Tasa Naste 1956
- Muthbhar Chane 1955
- Kuladaivat 1955
- Tarka 1954
- Gharbaar 1953
- May Bahini 1952
- Sharada 1951
- Patlache Por 1951
- Ram Ram Pahuna 1950
- Mandir 1948 Hindi
