= Shiradwad =

- Village
- Location in Karnataka, India Shiradwad (India)
- Coordinates: 16.5733°N 74.4841°E
- Country: India
- State: Karnataka
- District: Belgaum
- Taluka: Nippani

Marathi
  - Official: Kannada
- Time zone: UTC+5:30 (IST)
- 591214: 591214
- Vehicle registration: KA 23
- Nearest cities: Ichalakaranji, Kolhapur, Sangli.
- Lok Sabha constituency: Chikodi
- Sitting MP: Mr.Annasaheb Shankar Jolle
- Vidhan Sabha constituency: Nipani
- Sitting MLA: Mrs.Shashikala Jolle

Shiradwad is a village in Belgaum district of Karnataka on the bank of Dudhaganga River. The population has been recorded to be 3110 as of 2011. Marathi is the main spoken language followed by Kannada.
