= Jayesh Bugad =

Indian Speed Skater

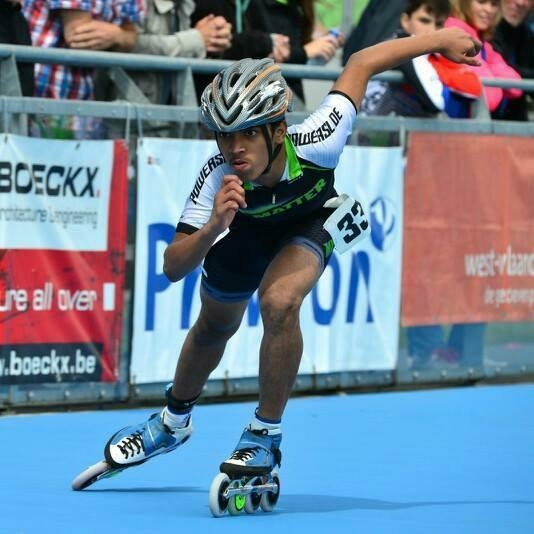
- Jayesh Bugad racing in the Flanders Grand Prix.

Personal information
- Nationality: Indian
- Born: 25 January 2000 Ichalkaranji, Maharashtra India
- Occupation: Skater
- Years active: 2005 - present
- Employer: Roller Skating Federation of India
- Height: 160.34 cm (63.13 in)

Sport
- Country: India
- Sport: Speed skating

Jayesh Uday Bugad is an Indian Inline Speed skater, who represented India in Flanders Grand Prix 2014. He is from Ichalkaranji, Maharashtra, India.

He is an Indian skating champion and holds more than 3 World Records in skating. Jayesh is also a social worker and pursuing his career in politics. He is currently the youngest appointed Leader of Bhartiya Janata Yuva Morcha. He is leading the campaign for Ichalkaranji city.

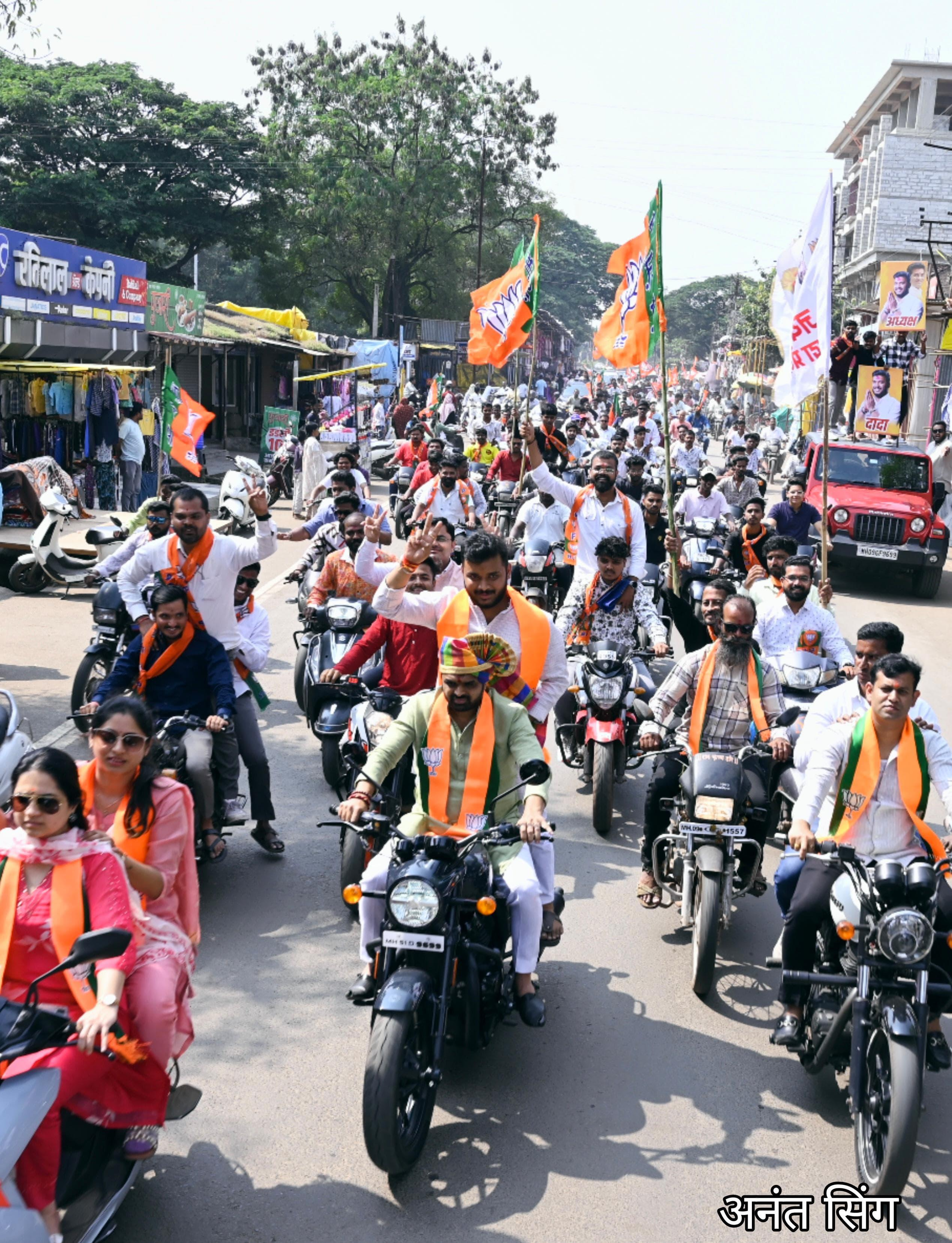
Jayesh Bugad after being elected as Leader of Bharatiya Janata Yuva Morcha, Ichalkaranji.

== Competitions ==
Year	Competition
2014	Flanders Grand Prix 2014
2015	52nd National Speed Skating Championships
2016	Largest Roller Skating Relay World Record 2016 India
2016	Guinness World Record at Belagavi 2016 India
