= Ichalkaranji =

Town in Maharashtra, India

- City
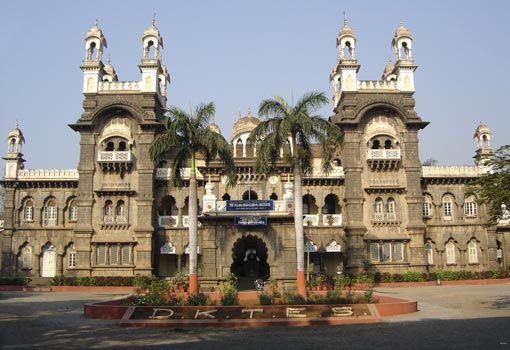
- Ichalkaranji Palace (Rajwada) - DKTE's TEI
- Nickname(s): The Textile Hub, Manchester of Maharashtra
- Interactive map of Ichalkaranji
- Location in Maharashtra, India Ichalkaranji (India)
- Coordinates: 16.7°N 74.47°E
- Country: India
- State: Maharashtra
- District: Kolhapur

Government
  - Type: Municipal Corporation
  - Body: Ichalkaranji Municipal Corporation

Area
  - Total: 49.84 km^{2} (19.24 sq mi)
- Elevation: 539 m (1,768 ft)

Population (2011)
  - Total: 287,570
  - Rank: 151
  - Density: 5,770/km^{2} (14,940/sq mi)

Languages
  - Official: Marathi
- Time zone: UTC+5:30 (IST)
- PIN: 416115/16/17
- Telephone code: 0230
- Vehicle registration: MH-09, MH-51
- Website: Ichalkaranji Municipal Corporation
- Lok Sabha constituency: Hatkanangale
- Vidhan Sabha constituency: Ichalkaranji
- Civic agency: Ichalkaranji Municipal Corporation

Ichalkaranji ([it͡səlkəɾəɳd͡ʒiː]) is a city located in the Kolhapur district of Maharashtra, India, known for its prominent textile and engineering industries. Often referred to as the “Manchester of Maharashtra,” the city is one of the country’s leading centres for grey fabric production and hosts a dense network of power looms, processing units, and garment manufacturers. Ichalkaranji has experienced rapid industrial growth since the mid‑20th century, evolving from a small princely town into a major economic hub with strong cooperative and entrepreneurial traditions.

== History ==
The history of Ichalkaranji is described in The Story of Ichalkaranji (1929) by English historian Horace George Franks. He notes that the city experienced frequent political unrest and women of the ruling House of Ichalkaranji actively participated in state affairs with influence comparable to men. A prominent example is Anubai, wife of Venkat Rao.

In 1892, Shrimant Narayan Rao Babasaheb became the eighth ruler of the House of Ichalkaranji. As a ruler, he is known for implementing modernizing reforms across all governed areas. Narayan Rao was well educated, with particular attention given to subjects that would help him navigate the complexities of administration. He also travelled extensively throughout the Indian Subcontinent and Southeast Asia, visiting Java, the Malay Peninsula, Ceylon (now Sri Lanka), and Burma. He also made 3 journeys to England and mainland Europe.

Narayan Rao Babasaheb was widely regarded as a patron of culture and an enlightened leader. Narayan Rao actively encouraged the study of art and Indian classical music, as well as providing financial support for art exhibitions in Pune and Mumbai. His interest in nurturing artistic talent would also lead to his endowment of scholarships at several art colleges in Maharashtra and students pursuing professional studies abroad.

During the reign of Narayan Rao, Ichalkaranji grew into a thriving industrial town. Narayan Rao's economic reforms fostered the growth of a large textile industry, noted for its decentralized and cooperative organization. Throughout his reign, Narayan Rao provided subsidies and free land to weavers and other promising businessmen. In 1904, Narayan Rao encouraged Vitthalrao Datar, a young entrepreneur from Ichalkaranji, to install a power loom. One of Narayan Rao's European journeys took him to Denmark, where he observed the country's thriving cooperative business sector and was impressed with its success. Upon his return to India, he sought to implement the principles of European cooperative ownership in order to modernize the economy of his realm.

== Geography and climate ==
Ichalkaranji

Climate chart (precipitation, max. and min. temperature)
| J | F | M | A | M | J | J | A | S | O | N | D |
| 2.8 29 12 | 2.1 32 14 | 3.3 36 19 | 3.5 38 22 | 24 38 25 | 114 34 24 | 116 30 22 | 120 29 21 | 122 30 21 | 61 32 19 | 11 30 15 | 6.5 28 12 |
- █ Average max. and min. temperatures in °C
- █ Precipitation totals in mm
- Source: MSN Weather
Imperial conversion
| J | F | M | A | M | J | J | A | S | O | N | D |
| 0.1 84 54 | 0.1 90 57 | 0.1 97 66 | 0.1 100 72 | 1 100 77 | 4.5 93 75 | 4.6 86 72 | 4.7 84 70 | 4.8 86 70 | 2.4 90 66 | 0.4 86 59 | 0.3 82 54 |
- █ Average max. and min. temperatures in °F
- █ Precipitation totals in inches

Ichalkaranji is located at 16.7°N 74.47°E. It has an average elevation of 538 metres (1,765 ft).

Ichalkaranji and other cities in the region receive substantial rainfall in the summer months. This is attributed to the Western Ghats, which separates the Deccan Plateau from the Western coast of India.

Ichalkaranji (Hatkanangale T.; 16° 40' N; 74° 25' E; p.27,423; 8.7 square miles), lies in the Panchganga Valley about eighteen miles (29 km) east of Kolhapur and half a mile north of the river. It is six miles (9.7 km) southeast of Hatkanangale railway station. The town consists of seven hamlets.

| City Summary | Numbers |
|---|---|
| City Area | 29.84km^{2} |
| Total Length of roads in City | 421.78 K.M. |
| Number of IMC Gardens | 5 |
| Number of IMC Cultural Centers | 7 |
| Air-conditioned Drama Theatre | 2 |
| Number of IMC Vegetable Markets | 3 |
| Post Offices | 5 |
| Telephone Exchange | 4 |
| Police station | 3 |
| Electrical Sub Station | 5 |
| Total Hospitals in IMC area | 197 |
| Blood Banks | 3 |
| Number of IMC Swmming Pool | 2 |
| Sports Stadium | 2 |
| Wrestling ground with Stadium | 1 |
| IMC Yoga and Gymnasium Center | 1 |
| Number of IMC Bio-Medical West Centers | 3 |
| Number of IMC Slaughter House | 1 |
| Number of IMC Water storage reservoirs | 9 |
| Number of IMC water treatment plant | 2 |
| Total Number of IMC Buildings | 75 |
| Cinema Hall | 16 |
| Marriage Hall | 35 |
| Total numbers of Spinning Mills | 11 |
| Total number of Yarn Sizing Units | 150 |
| Number of High-Schools | 57 |
| International Schools | 3 |
| Number of Colleges | 13 |
| Engineering College | 3 |

== Administration ==
The civil administration of the city is managed by the Ichalkaranji Municipal Corporation. The municipality oversees engineering works, health, sanitation, water supply, administration, and taxation in the city. The corporation is led by a Municipal President who is assisted by a Municipal Chief Officer and members of the council. The city is divided into 65 wards, with each council member (also known as councilor) serving terms of five years. The citizens directly elect the Municipal President. The Municipal Chief Officer presides over the Municipal Council. Its activities include developing new layouts and roads, town planning, and land acquisition. The city's power grid is managed by the Maharashtra State Electricity Distribution Company Limited (MAHADISCOM).

The citizens of Ichalkaranji elect one representative to the Maharashtra Vidhan Sabha (state council) to represent the constituency of Ichalkaranji. Regional representatives (MLA) to the state council themselves play a role in the civil administration. On July 18, 2010 representative Suresh Ganpati Halvankar installed 21 letterboxes in the city in response to numerous complaints and suggestions from the public. In November 2019, the citizens of Ichalkaranji elected Prakash Awade as their MLA. Ichalkaranji city, being a part of the larger Hatkanangale Lok Sabha constituency, also elects one member (MP) to the Lok Sabha, the lower house of the Indian Parliament. From 2009 to 2019, Raju Shetti served as MP. Following the General Election of 2019, Dhairyasheel Sambhaji Rao Mane from the party Shiv Sena has served as MP.

Politics in the city are dominated by three political parties: the Indian National Congress (INC), the Bharatiya Janata Party (BJP), and the Nationalist Congress Party (NCP). The city is on the brink of a public health and environmental emergency.

== Demographics ==
As per provisional Census reports, the population of Ichalkaranji in 2011 was 287,570; 149,691 male residents and 137,879 female residents respectively. Ichalkaranji has an average Literacy Rate of 85.98%, higher than the national average of 59.5%. Male literacy is 91%, while female literacy is 66%. 13% of the population is under 6 years of age. According to the 2011 census estimate, Ichalkaranji is the 151st most populous city in India.

The city's population as shown above excludes newly developed industrial and residential areas, villages that have been annexed by Ichalkaranji (known as part of the city) but have gram panchayat such as Kabnur, Yadrao, and Korochi etc. Village Shahapur, Ichalkaranji was included in Ichalkaranji Municipal Council in 1985. With these areas included, the population is 325,709 of which 169,870 are males and 155,839 are females. Marathi is the official and most spoken language, but Kannada is also spoken natively owing to history of the region. Other spoken languages are Hindi, Bhojpuri, English, and Urdu.

== Business and economy ==
Considering the ₹ 150 billion sales of textile products and nominal 20% net profit and 257,572 Population of the city, per capita income of Ichalkaranji is ₹ 416,472. Ichalkaranji also ranks among cities with high ownership rates of consumer products such as home appliances and fast-moving consumer goods.

== Industry ==
Approximately 40% of new automobile sales in Kolhapur district is from Ichalkaranji Catchment area. Maruti Suzuki, Tata Motors, Hero, Bajaj, Honda and TVS Motor have authorized sales and services centres in Ichalkaranji. Suzuki and Yamaha also have their service centers in Ichalkaranji.

Ichalkaranji is one of the fastest-growing industrial areas in Maharashtra and has even been termed the "Manchester of Maharashtra". Having mixed communities from all parts of India this is a cosmopolitan town by true means. The city's economy is driven predominantly by the textile industry. Engineering is the second largest industry in the city. There is much progressive agriculture in the area surrounding the city. There are at least 14 banking companies in the city with almost all banks in India having a branch in the city. Textile goods manufactured in the city are sold all over India as well as exported to various parts of the world. Traders use the Centralized Online Real-time Exchange Core Banking facility for financial transactions. Indian Settlement Systems such as Real-time gross settlement RTGS and National Electronic Funds Transfer NEFT System is also available in almost all branches of banks in the city. Despite all these Bankers clearing house in the city processes approximately 12,000 Cheques on each working day. Clearing house is managed by the State Bank of India. CTS clearing has been started. Most of the Insurance companies in India have offices in the city.

=== Textile industry ===
Ichalkaranji, popular as the 'Manchester of Maharashtra', has about 25 spinning units with about 1.25 lakh power looms, 20,000 semi-automatic looms and 9,000 shuttle-less looms to run till December 2018, with a daily turnover of nearly ₹10 billion (US$100 million). apart from numerous power and hand processing houses. The town produces one crore meter of yarn every day which translates into a business of Rs 45 crore a day. Of the total production, 15 percent is directly exported while another 40 percent is for indirect export after processing. According to locals, over 50,000 weavers depend on their livelihood working in the power looms in town.

Before 1980, Ichalkaranji was known for cotton poplin, dhoti, and cotton saris. In the mid-1980s, weavers of the city started producing denim, canvas, chiffon, and fabric for school uniforms (khaki drill). Fabrics such as seersucker, Oxford, herringbone, ripstop, chambray, tweed, and twill made in or around the Ichalkaranji city are used by many domestic and international fashion brands such as Raymond's of India, Armani, Banana Republic, Hugo Boss, and Paul Smith.

== Spinning ==
In 1962 the Deccan Co-operative Spinning Mill Ltd. came into existence in Ichalkaranji, which was the first Co-operative Spinning Mill in Asia. As of 2010, with over 20 modern spinning mills this region has become one of the major centers for spinning mills in India. Some of these spinning mills are 100% export-oriented Units of cotton yarn.

Yarn sizing is a preparatory process before the weaving that gives strength to yarn. The city has approximately 175 sizing units, which work for 24 hours a day and 6 days a week.

=== Agriculture ===
The city is surrounded by five sugar refineries. Annually they process over 5000000 metric tons of sugarcane, as of 2009 sugarcane prices of ₹2600 per ton. Sugarcane farmers itself bring in approximately Rs. 13000000000 ($13billion) to the economy of the city's Catchment area. Four out of five sugar mills have Co-generation plants. The oldest of these five sugar mills is Deshbhakta Ratnappa Kumbhar Panchganga Sahakari Sakhar Karkhana Ltd, founded by Dr. Ratnappa Kumbhar, an Indian independence activist who signs the final draft of the Constitution of India. Shree Renuka Sugars Ltd, one of the leading sugar companies in India, has set up a Bagasse based 30 Megawatt Cogeneration power plant in Ichalkaranji.

== Education and research ==
Ichalkaranji has around 100 high schools with 3 international schools, around 20 colleges offering degree-level education in Arts, science, and commerce fields, 3 engineering colleges, 1 technical education institute and 1 research institute in engineering. Most of the schools and colleges are private and public or "municipal schools" (run by the local municipal council). The schooling system mainly offers Maharashtra State Board of Secondary and Higher Secondary Education as well as other boards such as the National Institute of Open Schooling (NIOS), Central Board for Secondary Education (CBSE) and so on. Marathi is the main language of instruction followed by English and Hindi.

== Media and communication ==
Mahasatta is the local newspaper of the city, while other Marathi language newspapers such as Sakaal, Pudhari, Loksatta, Lokmat, Kesari, Maharashtra Times, and Saamna are popular. Major English dailies in the city are The Times of India, The Indian Express Business Standard and The Economic Times. Major Hindi dailies in the city Navbharat Times, Lokmat Samachar (By lokamat group) and Vyapar (Hindi) of Janmabhoomi Group.

Star Maajha, Zee Marathi, Doordarshan Sahyadri, Colors Marathi, Sony Marathi and Me Marathi are popular television channels. English and Hindi entertainment and news channels are watched as well. Ichalkaranji has had FM Radio services running for the last few years. Though Radio Tomato (Pudhari Publications). 94.3 MHz, Radio Mirchi (98.3 MHz) tops the popularity rating along with All India Radio FM (102.7 MHz).

Broadband Internet access, provider in the city is DataOne by BSNL Fixed Line telecom services are offered alongside GSM and Code division multiple access (CDMA) mobile services. Cell phone coverage is extensive, and the main service providers are Vodafone Essar, Airtel, BSNL, Reliance Communications, Idea Cellular, Aircel and Tata Indicom. Recently a 3G service has been launched by Vodafone Essar, Airtel, BSNL, Reliance Communications, Idea Cellular, Aircel and Tata Indicom. The work for laying Fibre optics for 4G is in progress.

== Transport ==
Ichalkaranji is well connected by the neighboring cities and national highways by road. MSRTC runs bus service to Sangli and Kolhapur every 15 minutes from Ichalkaranji. The public transport is mainly provided by MSRTC, KSRTC and private buses which serve to all major destinations in Maharashtra, Karnataka and Andhra Pradesh. Private bus services are connected to major cities like Mumbai, Pune, Nagpur, Sambhaji Nagar, Nashik, Shirdi, Bangalore, Mangalore, Hyderabad, Solapur, Surat, Ahmedabad, Panjim. MSRTC provides bus service from Ichalkaranji to Kolhapur and Sangli every 15 minutes. Sangli railway station is also connected to the city via bus services. From Sangli railway station, there are several trains to Delhi, Mumbai, Bengaluru, Pune, Goa, Mysuru, Hubli, Belgaum, Surat, Vadodara, Ahmedabad, Jodhpur, Udaipur, Bikaner, Ajmer, Agra, Gwalior, Jhansi, Puducherry, Tirunelveli(Kanyakumari), Guntakal, Tiruchirappalli, Ratlam, Kota, Nagpur, Itarsi, Chitaurgarh, Abu Road, Gandhidham etc. Sangli station is convenient to reach from Ichalkaranji. Even though railway stations and the Kolhapur airport are nearby Ichalkaranji itself is not connected by rail or air.

The nearest railway stations are:

- Hatkanangale – 6 km
- Sangli railway station – 28 km
- Rukadi – 12 km
- Valivade – 18 km
- jaysingpur – 15 km

The nearest airports are:

- Kolhapur – 30 km (Maharashtra)
- Belgaon – 110 km (Karnataka)
- Pune – 250 km (Maharashtra)
- Mumbai – 389 km (Maharashtra)
- Aurangabad− 400 km(Maharashtra)

== Notable people ==
- Kallappa Awade, politician
- Raju Awale, politician
- Jayesh Bugad, speed skater.
- Mirashi Buwa, classical singer.
- Anant Ramachandra Gokhale, advocate of women's education and author
- Suresh Ganpati Halvankar, politician
- Balakrishnabuwa Ichalkaranjikar, classical singer
- Subhash Khot, mathematician, theoretical computer scientist
- Ratnappa Kumbhar, politician and independence activist
- Rajaram Mane, politician
- Vaishnavi Powar, kho kho player

== See also ==
- Ichalkaranji Lok Sabha constituency
- Ichalkaranji Assembly constituency
- List of Maratha dynasties and states
- List of princely states of British India (by region)
- Maratha Empire
- Textile industry
- Mughal Empire
