= Radhanagari =

Radhanagari Radhabai
- town
- Location in Maharashtra, India
- Coordinates: 16°24′50″N 73°59′52″E
- Country: India
- State: Maharashtra
- District: Kolhapur
- Founder: Shahu Raje
- Named for: sisters name Radhabai

Government
  - Body: Grampanchayat

Languages
  - Official: Marathi
- Time zone: UTC+5:30 (IST)
- PIN: 416211
- Telephone code: 02321
- Nearest city: Kolhapur
- Lok Sabha constituency: kolhapur
- Vidhan Sabha constituency: radhanagari

Radhanagari is a town and the headquarters of Radhanagari tehsil in the Radhanagari subdivision of Kolhapur district in the Indian state of Maharashtra. It is located on the banks of the Bhogawati River, near the Radhanagari Dam and the Radhanagari Wildlife Sanctuary.

== Transport ==
By Rail
There is railway station at Kolhapur, which is 55 km (34 mi) away from Radhanagari Wildlife Sanctuary for bison.
By Air
The nearest airport is at Kolhapur, operating flights to Mumbai, Bangalore, Nagpur, Hyderabad and Ahmadabad which is 65 km (40 mi) away from Radhanagari.
By Road
Radhanagari is 55 km (34 mi) from Kolhapur on Kolhapur-Deogad state highway.
Nearby Excursions
Dajipur reserve forest full of biodiversity.
Nearby Cities
Kolhapur

== Places to visit ==
Radhanagri Dam Kalammawadi Dam
