= Anant Ramachandra Gokhale =

Indian educationalist (1907–1978)

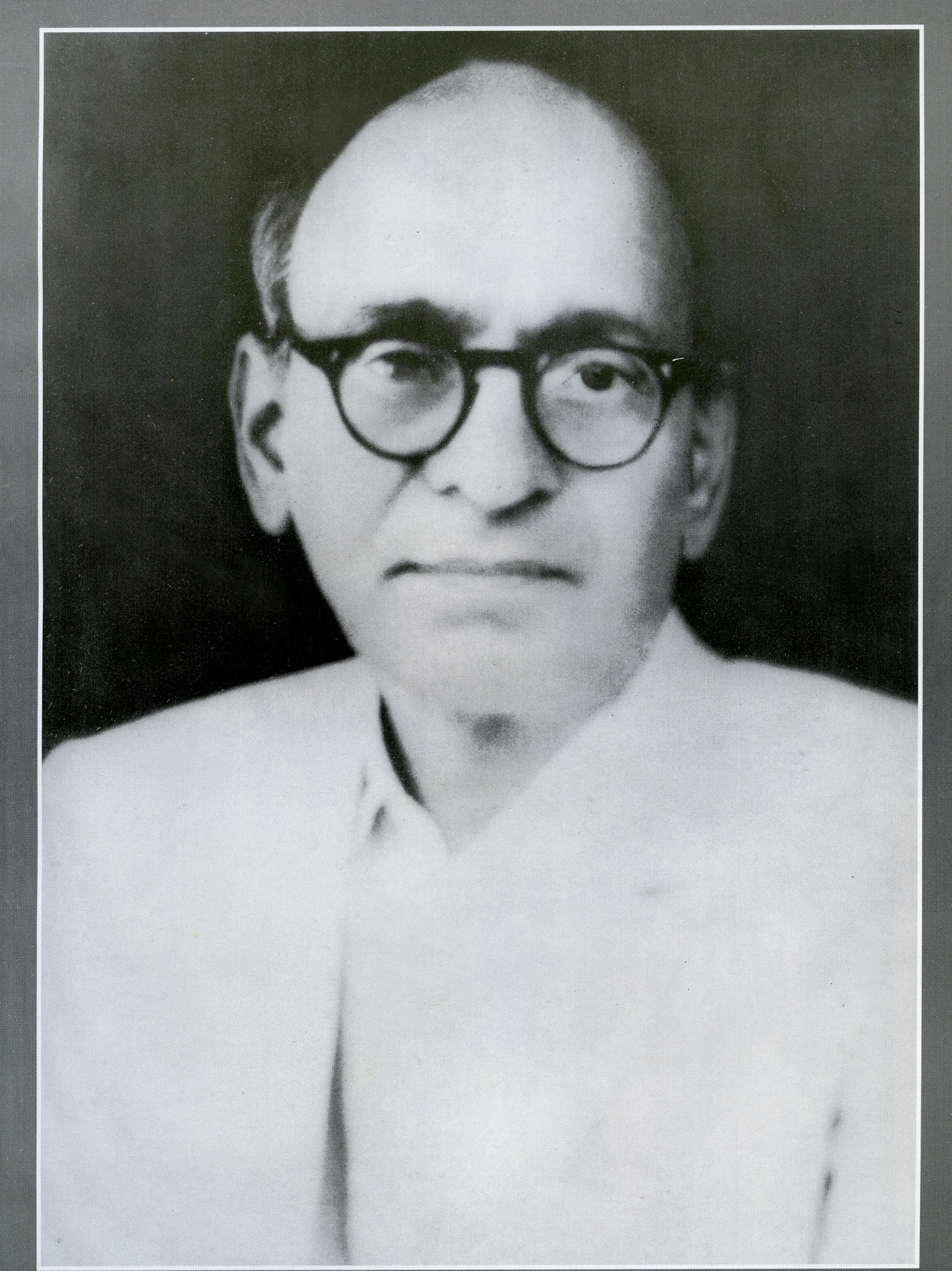
Anant Ramachandra Gokhale

Anant Ramachandra Gokhale (14 February 1907 – 25 June 1978) was an educationalist. In 20th-century India, many great personalities walked in multifaceted fields of Indian society. Many amongst them served the nation in different capacities through various occupations. Some of them contributed immensely in the field of education all over India. Gokhale was among such personalities who worked all his life for women's education and welfare.

Anant Ramachandra Gokhale, popularly known as A.R. Gokhale or Nanasaheb was born in Ichalkaranji, then a small state (now in Kolhapur District) of Maharashtra in a Chitpavan Brahmin family. His parents Ramachandra Vishnu Gokhale, himself a Sanskrit scholar and Mathurabai played an important role in ensuring higher education for their son. Anant Ramachandra Gokhale spent his early life in Belgaum, Karnataka. He finished his high school education from Beynon Smith High School Belgaum which was run by the missionaries. After matriculation, he studied in Willingdon College Sangli and graduated from Rajaram College Kolhapur in the year 1927. He also did his M.A. in English and Sanskrit from Deccan College Pune and B.T. from Tilak College of Education, Pune.

Anant Ramachandra Gokhale started his life as a school teacher in American Missionary School, Vengurla where he came across Dr. Robert H. H. Goheen, an American academic who was known for his selfless service and simple living with high thinking. Dr. Goheen's son Robert F. Goheen went on to become the president of Princeton University and United States Ambassador to India. Gokhale also worked with the New English High School Satara.

A.R.Gokhale was associated with the Servants of India Society, formed by Namdar Gopal Krishna Gokhale. A.R.Gokhale was involved in the activities of Bharat Sevak Samaj, founded by India's first Prime Minister Pandit Jawaharlal Nehru. He was also a member of Maharashtra Samajik Parishad.

== Servants of India Society ==
Anant Ramachandra Gokhale's life took a new turn in the 1930s when he was influenced by the preachings of great scholar of mathematics and leader Namdar Gopal Krishna Gokhale and joined the Servants of India Society which was founded by him in Pune.
The Servants of India Society was running an English Daily The Hitavada since 1911. With his flair for journalism and great command over English, Marathi and Sanskrit, Gokhale went on deputation to Delhi in early 1930s as a special correspondent for the newspaper and covered the proceedings of Central Legislative Assembly (Now known as Lok Sabha). He had a great opportunity to closely observe and meet leaders like Pandit Motilal Nehru, Barrister Muhammad Ali Jinnah who then represented the Indian National Congress, Vithalbhai Patel, the co-founder of Swaraj Party, Barrister M. R. Jayakar of Pune who was a founder of Pune Vidyapeeth, and several other leaders. Thus his life was enriched by a spell of journalism.

== Influence of women's education ==
A.R. Gokhale, during his college days in the 1920s was highly influenced by great personalities like Maharshi Dhondo Keshav Karve who had started Hingne Stree Shikshan Sanstha for destitute and child widows who lived life of Alawan. The institute grew up to become Shreemati Nathibai Damodar Thackersey Women's University. Thus the tradition of women's emancipation from slavery flourished in Maharashtra. Another pioneer of women education Ramabai Ranade, wife of Justice Mahadev Govind Ranade of Bombay High Court had founded Pune Sevasadan Society in Pune in the 1909 for poor and destitute child widows to make them self-reliant and independent through education. Her contemporary, Pandita Ramabai was also a fountainhead of women's liberation.

The women in the Central Provinces and Berar had a similar fate like rest of Maharashtra. In Nagpur, then the capital of Central Provinces and Berar, eminent people like Bhawani Shankar Niyogi, who later became the Chief Justice of Nagpur High Court, Justice W. R. Puranik of Nagpur High Court and Colonel K. V. Kukade and their friends were impressed by the work of Pune Sevasadan Society and the Nagpur branch of Pune Sevasadan came into existence on 2 January 1927 with G. B. Garud as Nagpur Sevasadan's first Superintendent. He served there till 1936.

In the year 1936, A.R. Gokhale, concluded his tenure with The Hitavada and moved to Nagpur along with his wife Mrs. Sushilabai Gokhale, herself a Fergusson College, Pune graduate, to follow his ideals and there began a long journey with Sevasdan Nagpur.

== Sevasadan Education Society ==
Anant Ramchnadra Gokhale's life turned a new corner to devote 40 years of life to women's education in 1936. Pune Sevasadan was looking for a young graduate couple in those days and had plans to take Nagpur Sevasadan forward. Gokhale and his wife Sushilabai Gokhale, both of whom were English, Marathi and Sanskrit scholars and orators was an apt couple to take over the reins and nurture Nagpur Sevasadan. Thus A.R.Gokhale became the superintendent of Sevasadan at a young age of 29. He was a teacher of English in high school for the 9th, 10th and 11th standards. Though he was the Superintendent of the school and was devoted to other aspects like school administration, fund raising for construction of buildings, he was also teaching English to female students of the school.

Gokhale took keen interest in the administration and also laid foundation of fledgling Sevasadan into a bigger institution. Nagpur Sevasadan had begun its journey in a rented bungalow in Dhantoli. He always wanted Sevasadan to move into a large premises and was in real sense a creator of converting this dream into reality for the benefit of destitute women and girls. He was continuously talking to the then Central Provinces and Berar Government and secured a plot for the school from them in the year 1939. Sevasadan shifted to its new building in 1940. His work did not stop only at the creation of one building, but he was toiling hard for the betterment of women's education and erected buildings for a High School, Pre-Primary Teachers Training College and Women's Hostel to bring Nagpur Sevasadan to its current status.

In those days, women in India were dependent on their families for survival because they were uneducated. The child widows had no choice to remarry and had to work for well-to-do families with a meagre income and no future, thus being exploited by the society as they were poor and uneducated. Their condition was pitiable, so it was necessary to make them educated and self-supportive. Nagpur Sevasadan gave them shelter in its women's hostel. Gokhale started many schemes in the society for their welfare. He brought in the concept of 'Earn and Learn' for these women so they could live their lives with respect in the society. The women who could not afford education and had no place to stay were accommodated in the women's hostel allowing them to work for the school and paid for the work done by them and also take up education and attend classes in the school or in the training colleges of Sevasadan.

Gokhale was a well known figure in Nagpur as a social worker and educator. During those days, the girl students hailing from Hyderabad State appeared for S.S.C examination of Nagpur Board and used to come to Nagpur for examinations in the summer. The poor girls had no accommodations for short period of 2 months. Gokhale ensured the girl students were allowed to stay in Sevasadan Hostel and helping them. Similarly, girls from refugee families who migrated from Pakistan were supported by him for taking up the exam in Nagpur, making facilities available for those students in the premises of Nagpur Sevasadan. For him, he preached what he taught ensuring equality among all his students irrespective of caste, creed and religion.

During the 1950s, there were no trained teachers for Balak Mandirs (Children School). So Gokhale and his wife started a Pre-Primary Teachers Training College for women and Mrs. Gokhale as its Principal helped the institute to bring out qualified teachers.

Gokhale was a founder President of Superintendents’ Association (now known as Headmasters' Association) in the 1940s for safeguarding the interests of the institutions. He was the President again in the early 1970s. Through his tireless efforts, construction of a hall for the Association's office and meetings came into a reality at Laxmi Nagar, Nagpur.

Gokhale breathed Sevasadan all through his life and developed the institute for women's education and their welfare.

== End of an era ==
Gokhale died in Sevasadan on 25 June 1978 at the age of 71. He dedicated his life to Sevasadan, where he was involved in its activities until his death.

Nagpur Sevasadan celebrated Mr. A.R. Gokhale's birth centenary year in 2006–2007 and installed his statue in the premises of Nagpur Sevasadan as a mark of respect and a book was published in his memory on the same occasion. The congratulatory message for the said book was received from Hon.Prof.Ram Shevalkar and Dr. Rajan Welukar then Vice Chancellor of YCMOU.

Current website of Sevasadan Nagpur acknowledges Mr.A.R.Gokhale as past management committee member.

The school is still run carrying the same principles and morals for which it was founded way back in 1927.

== Publications ==
1. Sevasadan Speaks is a book describing celebrations on the occasion of Golden Jubilee of Nagpur Sevasadan in the year 1977.
2. Biography of Charles Freer Andrews: He was a missionary who served in India in the early 1920s and was closely associated with Annie Besant’s Home Rule League. He was an educator and social reformer in India and close friend of Mahatma Gandhi and an influential factor in convincing Gandhi to return to India from South Africa.
3. Sadhu Sundar Singh, a saint from Punjab who was a missionary in the early 1920s.

== Gallery ==
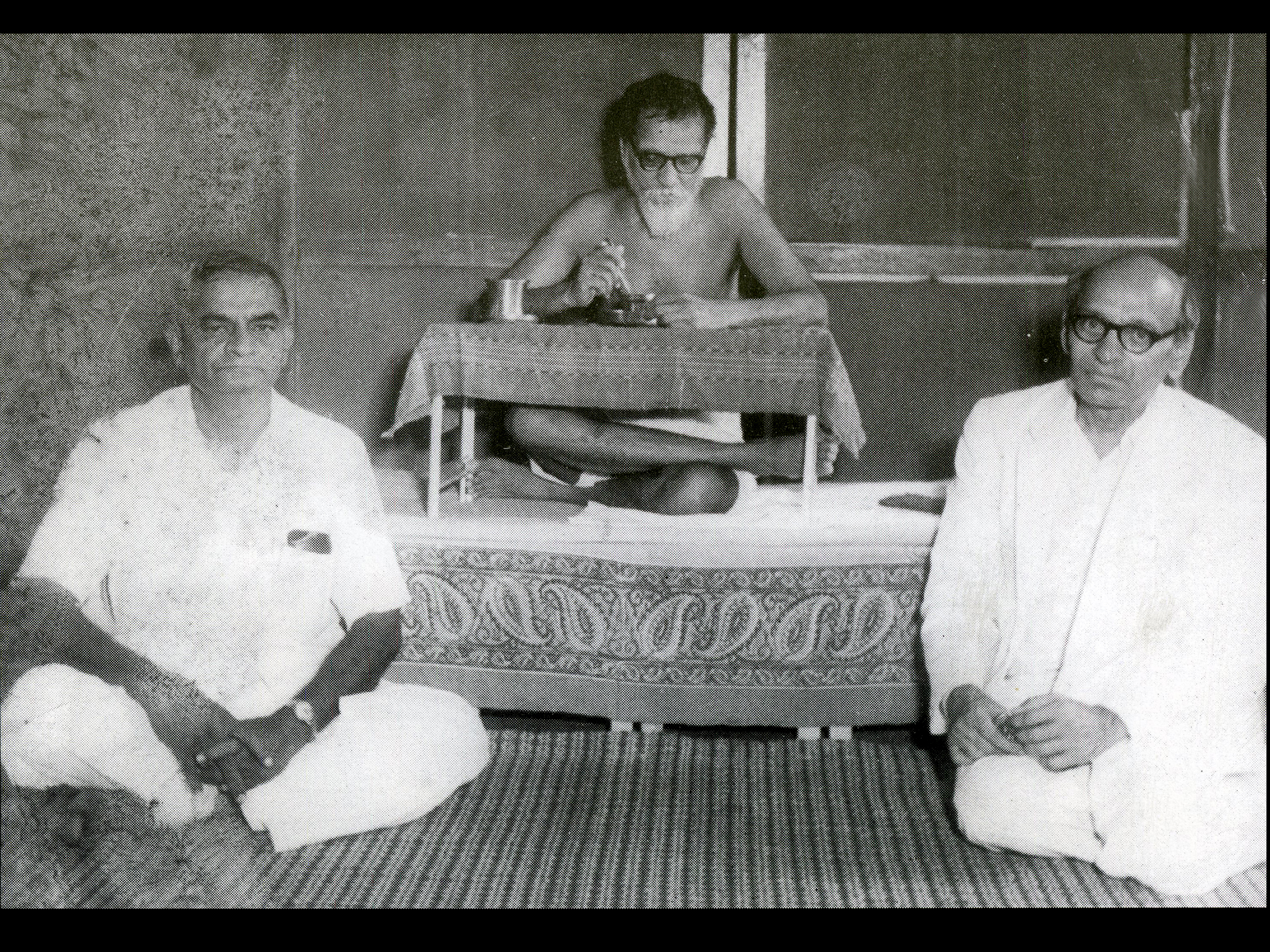
With Acharya Vinoba Bhave

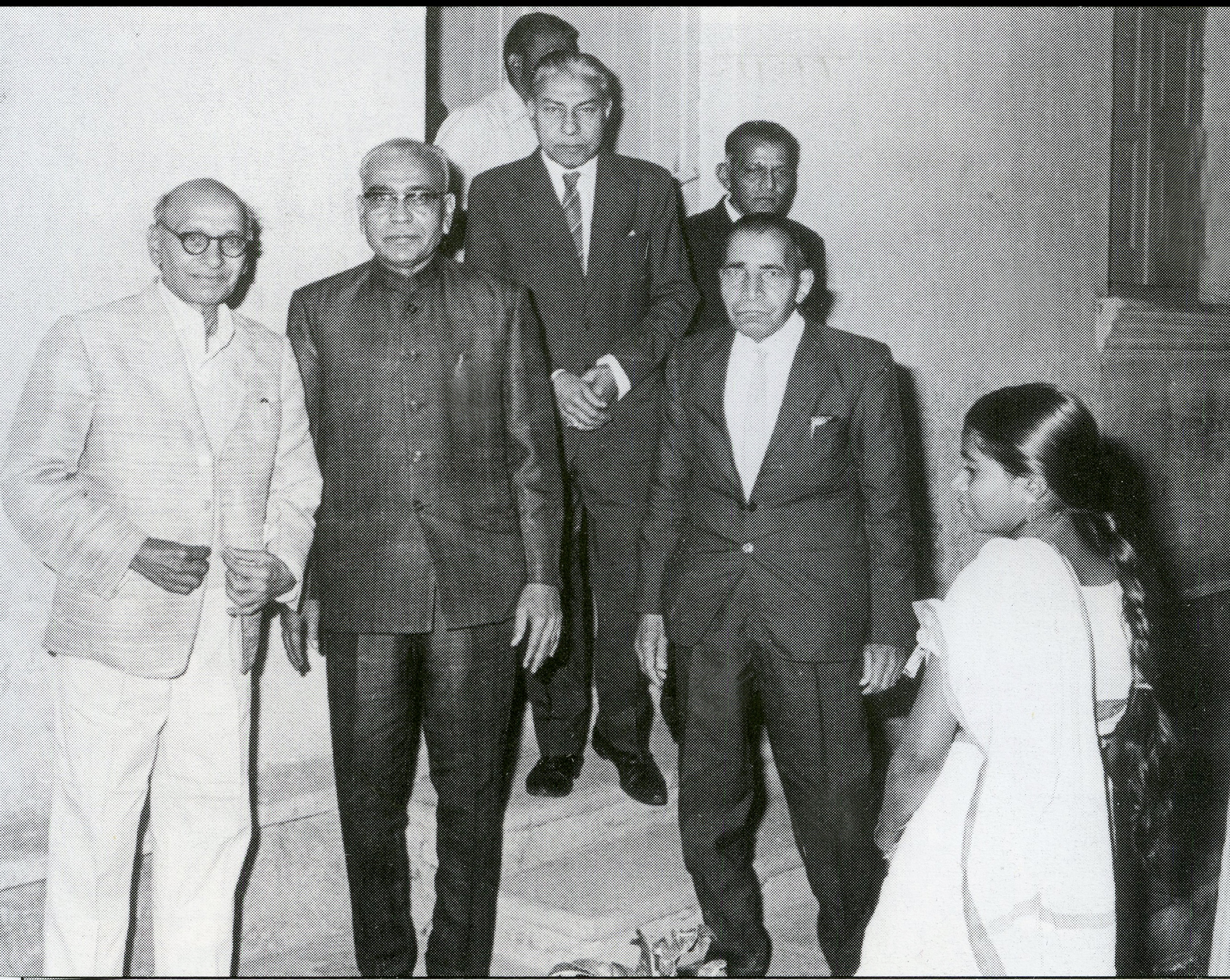
With Vasantrao Naik, the then Chief Minister of Maharashtra

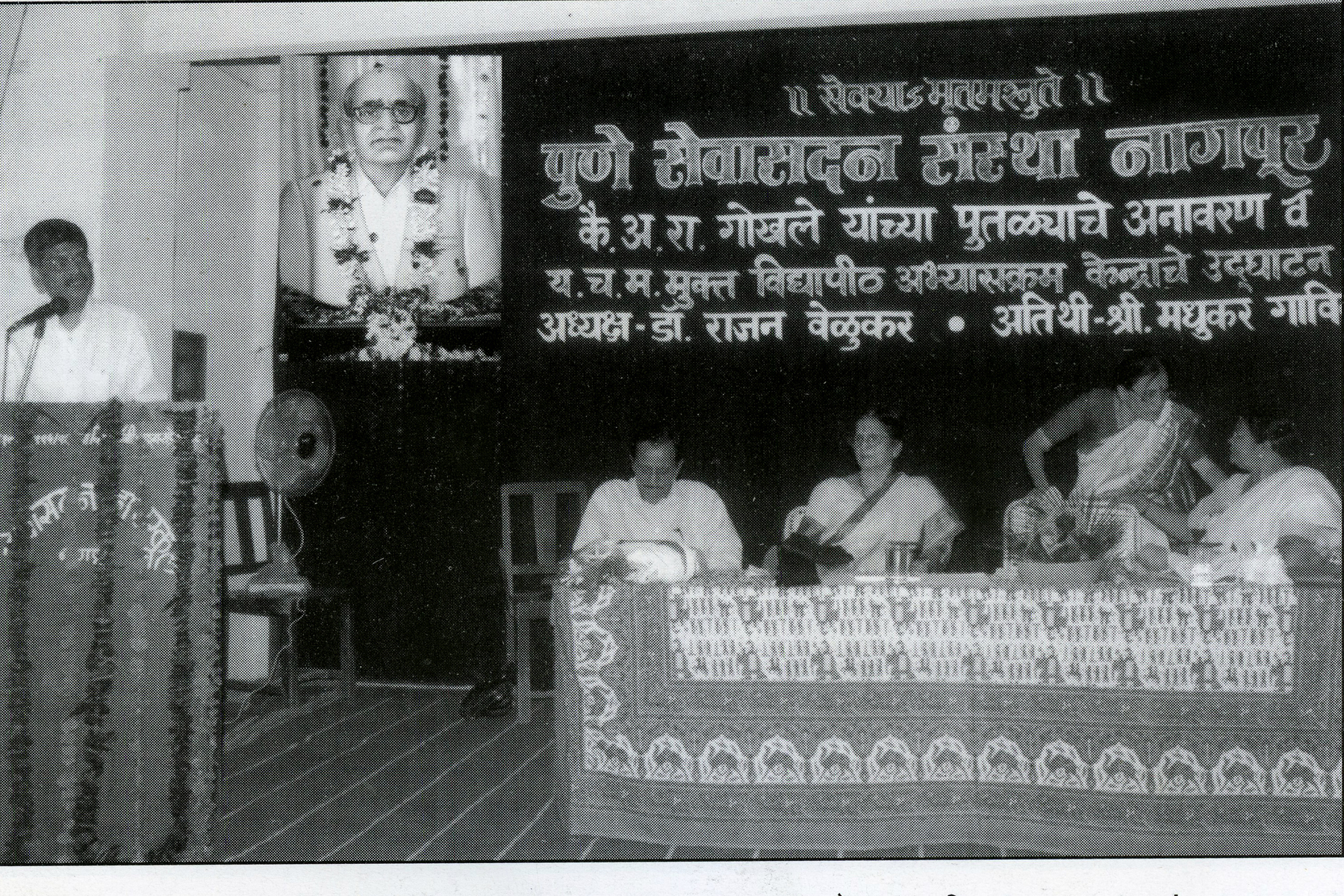
Statue Inauguration

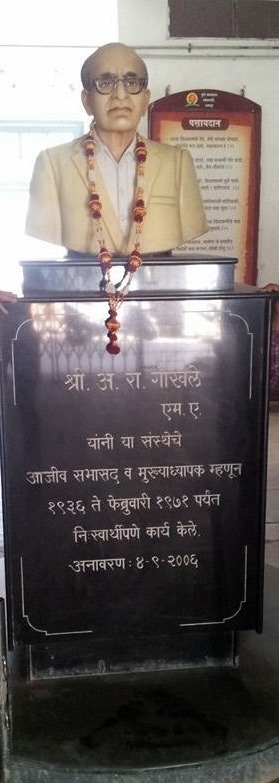
Anant Ramchandra Gokhale Statue
