= Ichalkaranji Municipal Corporation =

In Kolhapur District, Maharashtra, India

Type
- Type: Municipal Corporation

History
- Established: 2022
- Preceded by: Ichalkaranji Municipal Council, Estd.1904.

Leadership
- Mayor: Shri. Uday Dhatunde, BJP
- Commissioner and Administrator: Mrs. Pallavi Patil

Structure
- Seats: 65
- Political groups: Government (47): BJP (43); SS (3); NCP (1); Opposition (18): SSVA (17); SS(UBT) (1)

Elections
- Last election: 15 January 2026
- Next election: 2031

Website
- Ichalkaranji Municipal Corporation

The Ichalkaranji Municipal Corporation (IMC) is D grade Municipal Corporation of Kolhapur District, Maharashtra, the governing body of the city of Ichalkaranji. The municipal corporation consists of democratically elected members, is headed by a mayor and administers the city's infrastructure, public services and supplies. Members from the state's leading various political parties hold elected offices in the corporation.

In 2022, the Maharashtra State cabinet decided to elevate Ichalkaranji to a Municipal Corporation, as the city’s population surpassed 287,570 in the 2011 census. While the administration was initially managed by an appointed commissioner, the first general election for the Municipal Corporation was successfully conducted on January 15, 2026. This transition from a City Council to a Municipal Corporation was finalized to provide the city with greater financial autonomy and better resources to improve urban infrastructure.

== List of Mayors ==
Mayor	Party	Duration
Shri. Uday Dhatunde	Bharatiya Janata Party	10/02/2026 - Present

== Election results ==
=== 2026 ===
(Result on 16 January 2026)

Party	Seats	+/-
Bharatiya Janata Party	43	New entry
Shivshahu Vikas Aghadi	17	New entry
Shiv Sena	3	New entry
Nationalist Congress Party	1	New entry
Shiv Sena (UBT)	1	New entry
Total	65	
