= Korochi =

- Census town
- Location in Maharashtra, India
- Coordinates: 16.73°N 74.4382°E
- Country: India
- State: Maharashtra
- District: Kolhapur

Government
  - Type: Rural
  - Body: Congress

Population (2011)
  - Total: 28,136

Languages
  - Official: Marathi
- Time zone: UTC+5:30 (IST)
- Postal code: 416109

Korochi is a census town near Ichalkaranji in Kolhapur district, Maharashtra.

== Demographics ==
As of 2001 India census, Korochi had a population of 28,136. Males constitute 53% of the population and females 47%. Korochi has an average literacy rate of 69%, higher than the national average of 59.5%: male literacy is 76%, and female literacy is 60%. In Korochi, 14% of the population is under 6 years of age.

== Education ==
The most popular Marathi or English medium school in Korochi is Ratna Deep High School & Jr. College kabnur The town boasts of a few Marathi Medium schools and one English Medium CBSE School called New Generation Innovative School, which also follows the Day Boarding pattern, by Mrs. Vijaya Mohan.

== Speciality ==
Most of the people here depends on 'Construction Worker' as it has more population are illiterates. And also depend on, 'Powerloom' is nearer to the Manchester city Ichalkaranji.

Korochi has transformed from a village into a suburb of Ichalkaranji City. The Ichalkaranji City Border is just 1-2 kilometers from Korochi. It has co-operative bank branches, an insurance office, a post office, schools, colleges and all necessary infrastructure to boast as suburb of Ichalkaranji. It is developing rapidly and will be part of Ichalkaranji City in the future.

== Major Areas ==
1. Sanyukta Colony
2. Lokmanya Nagar
3. Korochi Gaobhag
4. Bhairavnath Shikshan Samuh Korochi (BSS)
5. Chavare Mala
6. Dhangar Mal
7. Vivekanand Nagar
8. Chavanwadi
9. Shivnager
10. Sai Colony
11. Siddarth Nagar
12. Pawale Mala
13. Shivaji Nagar
14. Kolsa Karkhana
15. Ratnparvati Vasahat
