= Gulabrao Patil =

Indian politician

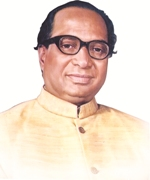

MP – Rajya Sabha, President Indian National Congress (I) Party Maharashtra, MLC
- In office 1966–1978, 1980–81, 1983–87
- Preceded by: Premlatatai Anandrao Chavan
- Succeeded by: Prof. S. M. I. Asir
- Constituency: Western Maharashtra – Sangli.

Personal details
- Born: Gulabrao Raghunathrao Patil; 16 September 1921 Benadi, Bombay State, British India
- Died: 21 January 1989 (aged 67) Pune, Maharashtra, India
- Party: Indian National Congress(I) – INC, Shiv Sena
- Spouse: Smt. Pramiladevi G. Patil
- Website: http://www.gpmthmc.org/
- As of 15 August, 2024

Gulabrao Raghunathrao Patil (16 September 1921 – 21 January 1989) was a Congress Party leader, member of parliament (MP)-Rajya Sabha India, Maharashtra State Sangli from 1966 to 1978, Member of the Legislative Council (MLC) of Maharashtra 1983−87 and President of Maharashtra Pradesh Indian National Congress (I) Committee, Mumbai 1981−82.

Patil also served as chairman of Maharashtra State Co-operative Bank in Mumbai from 1980 to 1982, Chairman of Sangli District Cooperative Bank Sangli and Secretary of National Co-operative Union of India (NCUI), New Delhi.

== Introduction ==
Patil was a member of parliament in Rajya Sabha (upper house of Indian Parliament) for two terms from 1966 to 1972 and 1972−1978. He was the president of Maharashtra Pradesh Congress(I)-MPCC from 1981 to 1982. Later in his life, he served in the Maharashtra State Member of the Legislative Council- MLC for four years during the period from 1983 to 1987.

Patil also served as chairman of Maharashtra State Co-operative Bank in Mumbai from 1980 to 1982 and Secretary of National Co-operative Union of India (NCUI) from 1973 to 1975, located in New Delhi. He traveled worldwide on behalf of Indian Government to study Co-operative Movements and Agriculture in different countries such as the United States, Great Britain, Korea, and Germany.

== Early life ==
Gulabrao Patil was born on 16 September 1921 in Benadi, a village on the Maharashtra-Karnataka state border near Kolhapur and Sangli districts. He obtained his BA in English and LLB(Special) from Kolhapur Law college.

== Politics ==
Patil was mainly active in cooperative sector but like most other leaders of Maharashtra during that era, he became active in state and national politics. He served as Member of Indian Parliament for 12 years and was president of Maharashtra Congress. In 1978, he joined the Indira Gandhi led Congress(I), where he was one of the first from Maharashtra to join Congress(I) at that time. Soon in 1981, Indira Gandhi appointed Patil as president of Maharashtra Pradesh Congress(I) Committee. In next general election Congress(I) won by big margin in Maharashtra under his leadership.

Patil contested Maharashtra Assembly Election in 1980 from Walva Constituency, Sangli District and lost.

In 1983 G.R Patil was appointed as chairman of the Committee for The Rehabilitation of Financial Weak Sugar Factories of Maharashtra, his recommendations helped in reestablishing many sugar factories; this transparent report on Sugar Factories is still considered as most reliable referral today in Maharashtra State.

== Legacy ==
=== Statues and memorials ===
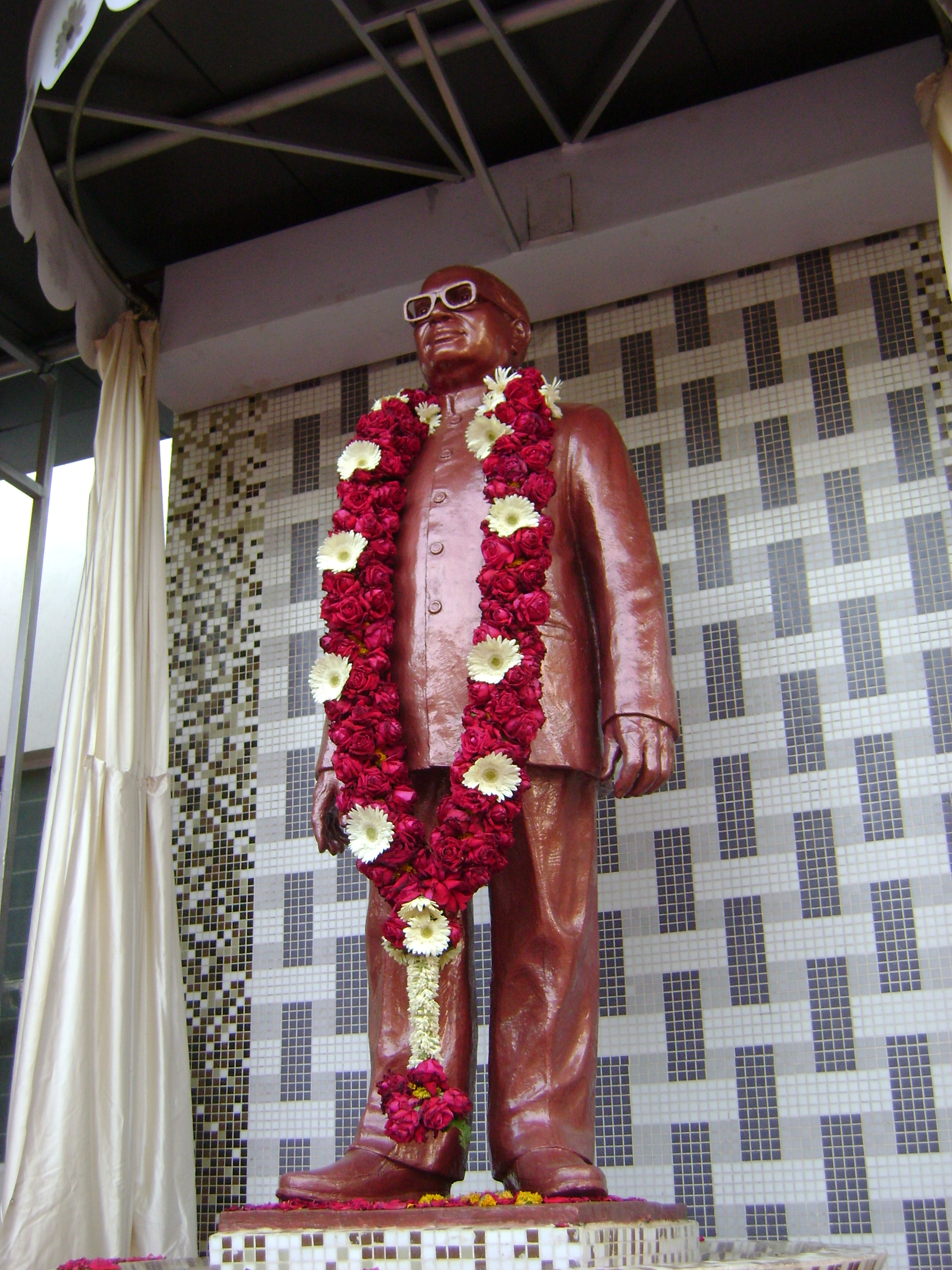
Statue of Patil at Sangli DCC Bank

On 21 January 2013, Sangli District Central Co-operative Banks craftsman Late. Patil's full size bronze statue was unveiled by Prithviraj Chavan, Then Chief Minister, Maharashtra.

=== Educational institutes ===
There is Gulabrao Patil Memorial Trust (GPMT).

== References and further reading ==
- Gulabrao Patil Member of Parliament-https://rajyasabha.nic.in/rsnew/member_site/Main.aspx

Preceded by Premlatakaki Chavan	Gulabrao Patil-President Maharashtra Pradesh Congress Committee; 1981–1982	Succeeded by Prof. S. M. I. Asir
