= Vedganga River =

River in India

Coordinates: 16°33′N 74°26′E

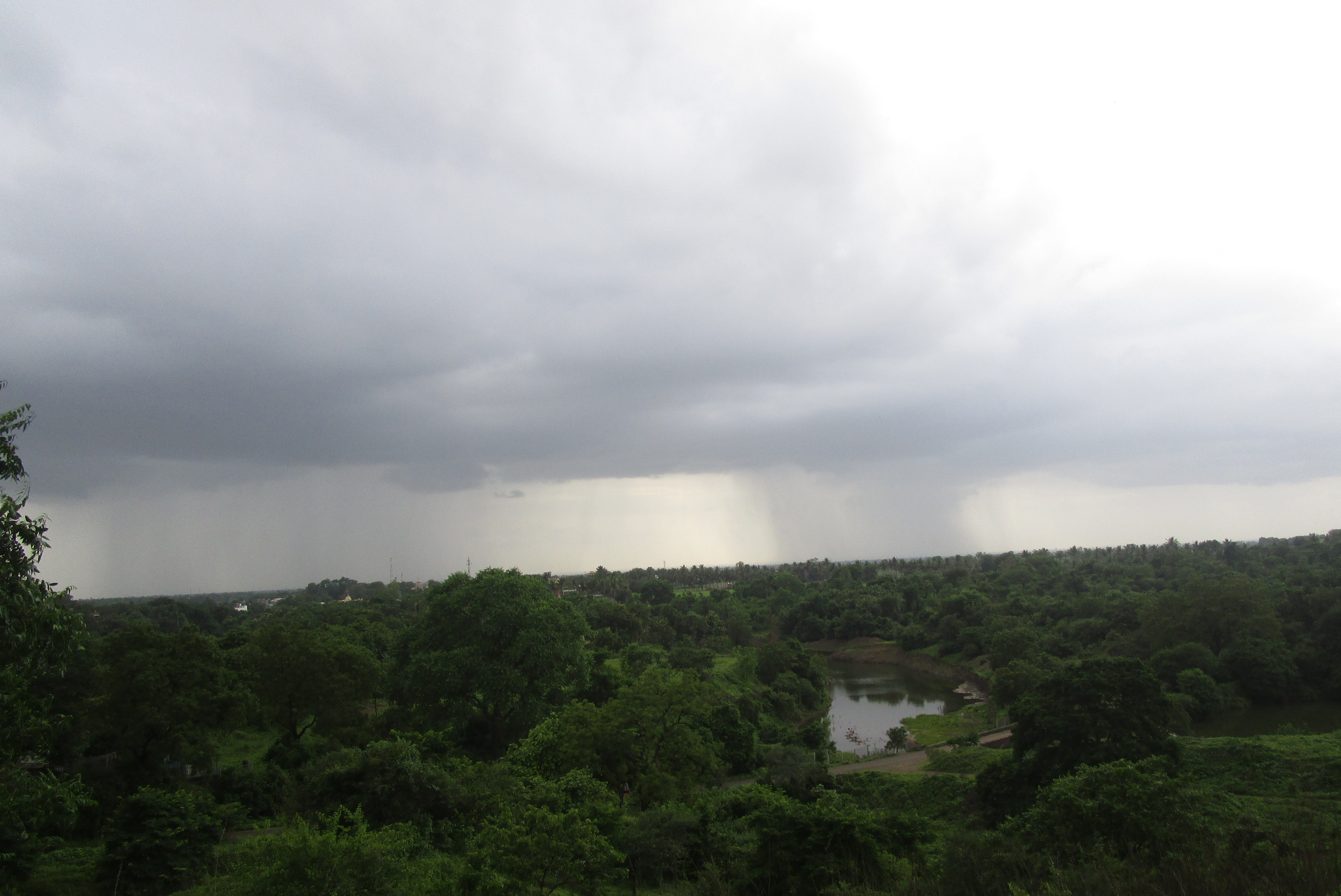

Location
- Country: India
- State: Maharashtra, Karnataka

Physical characteristics
- Source: Western Ghats
- Mouth: Dudhganga River
- Length: 92 km (57 mi)

The Vedganga River is a river in India, which joins the Dudhganga River. Further, Dudhganga joins the Krishna River. Several villages like Jatrat, Barawad, Kunnur in Karnataka are dependent on Vedganga for water.

The Vedganga River rises at an elevation of 900 m in the Kolhapur District of Maharashtra State from the eastern slopes of the Western Ghats. The river flows mostly north-eastwards in Maharashtra State and thereafter continues to flow eastwards in Karnataka state to join the Dudhganga River at Barawad in Karnataka, Dudhganga River flowing eastwards joining the Krishna River in Kallol Yedur in Karnataka from the right bank.

The rugged terrain is cut with valleys of dendritic pattern of streams feeding the tributaries of the Krishna River system. The sub-tributaries and tributaries of Ghatprabha and Malprabha located on the right bank of the Krishna River offer good sites for hydro-electric development through dam-toe-power stations.
