= Radhanagari Dam =

- Location within Maharashtra
- Official name: Radhanagari Dam D01033
- Location: Radhanagari
- Coordinates: 16°24′22″N 73°57′36″E
- Opening date: 1954 1st Stage 1909-1918 2nd Stage 1939-1954
- Owners: Government of Maharashtra, India

Dam and spillways
- Type of dam: Gravity
- Impounds: Bhogawati river
- Height: 42.68 m (140.0 ft)
- Length: 1,143 m (3,750 ft)

Reservoir
- Total capacity: 220,000,000 m^{3} (7.8×10^{9} cu ft)
- Surface area: 18,218 km^{2} (7,034 sq mi)

Radhanagari Dam, is a gravity dam on Bhogawati river near Radhanagari in the state of Maharashtra in India. Construction was initiated by visionary Rajarshi Shahu on 18 February 1907. The dam is being used for irrigation as well as hydro-electricity. The dam is located amidst scenic surrounding in the backdrop of thick forest cover.

- The scheme was suggested by Pandurangrrao Krishnajirao Shinde, Esqr, BA, I.S.E ref to Report of Examination, by Sir Henry Howard, O.I.E, M.C., M Inst.C.E., M. I. E.E.. Considering the suggested advantage towards increasing irrigated land up to 15000 hectares and satisfying Kolhapur municipal water requirement, the share capital raised was paid back to concerned share holders who had planned for thermo-electric (by letting all water into Konkan for electricity generation) and mining project.
- Because of Mr Shinde's suggestion, the scheme was handed over to government in interest of people, after the capital invested was realised. (Ref report by Henry Howard)
- Scheme was approved by Rajaram Maharaj or else would have been a thermal electric project, in favour of British industrial syndicate as suggested in the Second opinion of Sir Vishveswarayya.
- In 1941 PK Shinde was Specially appointed as Chief Engineer due to his technical competency and experience.
- Today Radhanagari Dam is the main reason for flourishing agriculture, and jaggery industry in Kolhapur District. The water need of Municipal Corporation of Kolhapur is satisfied through this dam.

Radhanagari Dam supports large variety of Flora and Fauna. It is surrounded by dense forest and has wide variety of wildlife and naturally evolved ecosystem. It was because of Mr P K Shinde's efforts that thermo-electric project and mining for metals was sidelined. Radhanagari Dam not only has a technology worth studying but also a history, that changed the fate of agriculture in Kolhapur.

== Specifications ==
This dam is famous for its automatically operated 7 gates, which doesn't require any electrical or mechanical power to operate it. Till now this technology is not in any of the dam in India, except this dam. Other than this 7 automated gates, there are five manually operated gates in this dam. The height of the dam above lowest foundation is 42.68 m (140.0 ft) while the length is 1,143 m (3,750 ft). The gross storage capacity is 236,810,000 m^{3} (8.363×10^{9} cu ft).

== Purpose ==
- Irrigation
- Kolhapur cities water need
- Hydroelectricity

== See also ==
- Dams in Maharashtra
- List of reservoirs and dams in India
