= Shahapur, Ichalkaranji =

Shahapur is a neighborhood in the northern part of Ichalkaranji City, Maharashtra, India. In 1982, through the efforts of Ashokrao Jambhale, the area was incorporated into the Ichalkaranji municipal council. The area is home to several educational institutions, including Shahapur High School, Vinayak High School, and multiple municipal primary schools. The neighborhood has strong cultural traditions centered around Lord Mhasoba, who is the local deity. An annual fair is celebrated on the first Tuesday following Gudhi Padwa (the Maharashtrian New Year).
