= Kabnur =

- census town
- Location in Maharashtra, India
- Coordinates: 16.7215°N 74.4119°E
- Country: India
- State: Maharashtra
- District: Kolhapur

Government
  - Type: Nagar Panchayat
  - Body: Panchayati raj

Population (2001)
  - Total: 49,000

Languages
  - Official: Marathi
- Time zone: UTC+5:30 (IST)
- Postal code: 416119
- Vehicle registration: MH09

Kabnur is a census town near Ichalkaranji in Kolhapur district, Maharashtra, India.

== Demographics ==
As of 2001 India census, Kabnur had a population of 49894. Males constitute 53% of the population and females 47%. Kabnur has an average literacy rate of 73%, higher than the national average of 59.5%: male literacy is 79%, and female literacy is 65%. In Kabnur, 13% of the population is under 6 years of age.
