= Kalammawadi Dam =

- Location within Maharashtra
- Official name: Dudhaganga Dam
- Location: Radhanagari
- Coordinates: 16°21′00″N 74°01′00″E
- Opening date: 1983
- Owners: Government of Maharashtra, India

Dam and spillways
- Type of dam: Gravity
- Impounds: Dudhganga river
- Height: 73.08 m (239.8 ft)
- Length: 1,280 m (4,200 ft)
- Spillway capacity: 1940 m^{3}/sec

Reservoir
- Total capacity: 719,120,000 m^{3} (2.5395×10^{10} cu ft)
- Surface area: 25360 m^{2}

Kalammawadi Dam, is a gravity dam on Dudhaganga river near Radhanagari in the State of Maharashtra, India. Kalammawadi dam is the biggest dam in Kolhapur District. The dam construction was initiated by the Government of Maharashtra in 1983 and was completed in 1999. It is being used for irrigation as well as hydro-electricity power generation. There are great locations for outings, listed on Kolhapur Tourism

The dam was built on Dudhaganga river, which is located in the south western part of Kolhapur district in Maharashtra, it was inaugurated by Indira Gandhi, the late prime minister of India. With a water storage capacity of 28 Thousand Million Cubic(TMC), the dam is located amidst a scenic surrounding with the backdrop of a thick forest cover. The surrounding dense forest has a large biodiversity. It is also home to India's endangered bison which is called the Gaur. The dam is situated at village Kalammawadi (Dudhaganga Nagar). It has left and right canals connected to carry water for irrigation purposes. The hydroelectric power generation house has three electric generators in good working conditions beneath the dam. There are many villages on bank of Dudhganga river which uses the dam water for domestic purposes. There is a temple of the goddess Kalamma damDevi.

== Specifications ==
The height of the dam above lowest foundation is 73.08 m (239.8 ft) while the length is 1,280 m (4,200 ft).

== Purpose ==
- Irrigation
- Hydroelectricity

== See also ==
- List of reservoirs and dams in India
