= Dudhaganga =

Coordinates: 16°35′01″N 74°38′05″E

Location
- Country: India
- State: Maharashtra, Karnataka

Physical characteristics
- Source
  - location: Maharashtra, India
- Mouth: Krishna River
- Length: 103 km (64 mi)

Basin features
- Tributaries
  - right: Vedganga River

The Dudhaganga (or Dudhganga, Doodhganga) is a right-bank tributary river of the Krishna in western India. It rises in Kolhapur district of Maharashtra in the Western Ghats and flows eastward through the Kolhapur and Belgaum districts in Karnataka before joining the Krishna. Vedganga River is a tributary of Dudhaganga. Parts of its course form the boundary between Karnataka and Maharashtra states.

The river is dammed to form the Kalammawadi reservoir in the west of Kohlapur district.
